= List of Listronotus species =

This is a list of 103 species in the genus Listronotus.

== Listronotus species ==
- Listronotus alternatus (Dietz, 1889)
- Listronotus americanus LeConte, 1876
- Listronotus angustatus (Champion, 1902)
- Listronotus annulipes (Blatchley, 1925)
- Listronotus anthracinus (Dietz, 1889)
- Listronotus appendiculatus (Boheman, 1842)
- Listronotus arizonicus O'Brien, 1981
- Listronotus bagoiformis Champion, G.C., 1902 synonym of L. punctiger (O'Brien 1981)
- Listronotus blandus Henderson, 1940
- Listronotus blatchleyi Henderson, 1940
- Listronotus borrichiae O'Brien, 1981
- Listronotus burkei O'Brien, 1981
- Listronotus californicus (Dietz, 1889)
- Listronotus callosus LeConte, 1876
- Listronotus carinatus (Blatchley, 1928)
- Listronotus caudatus (Say, 1824)
- Listronotus conabilis O'Brien, 1981
- Listronotus cribricollis LeConte, J.L., 1876 synonym of L. rotundicollis
- Listronotus crypticus O'Brien, 1981
- Listronotus cryptops (Dietz, 1889)
- Listronotus debilis Blatchley, 1916
- Listronotus deceptus (Blatchley, 1915)
- Listronotus deitzi O'brien, 1979
- Listronotus delumbis (Gyllenhal, 1834)
- Listronotus dietrichi (Stockton, 1963)
- Listronotus dietzi O'Brien, 1979
- Listronotus distinctus Henderson, 1940
- Listronotus distinguendus Schenkling, S. & Marshall, G.A.K., 1931 synonym of L. sordidus
- Listronotus dorsalis (Dietz, 1889)
- Listronotus durangoensis O'Brien, 1977
- Listronotus echinatus (Dietz, 1889)
- Listronotus echinodori O'Brien, 1977
- Listronotus elegans Van Dyke, 1929
- Listronotus elegantulus O'Brien, 1981
- Listronotus elongatus
- Listronotus fasciatus O'Brien, 1981
- Listronotus filiformis
- Listronotus floridensis Blatchley & Leng, 1916 synonym of L. appendiculatus
- Listronotus frontalis LeConte, 1876
- Listronotus gracilis LeConte, J.L., 1876 synonym of L. punctiger (O'Brien, 1981)
- Listronotus grypidioides (Dietz, 1889)
- Listronotus hirtellus (Dietz, 1889)
- Listronotus hoodi (Stockton, 1963)
- Listronotus hornii (Dietz, 1889)
- Listronotus humilis (Gyllenhal, 1834)
- Listronotus hyperodes (Dietz, 1889)
- Listronotus impressifrons LeConte, J.L., 1876 synonym of L. oregonensis
- Listronotus impressus Van Dyke, 1929 synonym of L. appendiculatus
- Listronotus inaequalis LeConte, J.L., 1876 synonym of L. squamiger
- Listronotus incompletus (Hatch, 1971)
- Listronotus ingens Henderson, 1940
- Listronotus insignis Henderson, 1940
- Listronotus laramiensis (Angell, 1893)
- Listronotus latinasus (Blatchley, 1922)
- Listronotus latiusculus LeConte, J.L., 1876
- Listronotus leechi Sleeper, 1955 synonym of L. punctiger (O'Brien, 1981)
- Listronotus leucozonatus Chittenden, 1926
- Listronotus lodingi (Blatchley, 1920)
- Listronotus lutulentus (Boheman)
- Listronotus maculatus (Hatch, 1971)
- Listronotus maculicollis (Kirby, 1837) (annual bluegrass weevil)
- Listronotus manifestus Henderson, 1940
- Listronotus marginalis O'brien, 1977
- Listronotus marshalli O'Brien, 1981
- Listronotus meridionalis O'brien, 1977
- Listronotus montanus (Dietz, 1889)
- Listronotus muratus Scudder, S.H., 1890
- Listronotus nebulosus LeConte, 1876
- Listronotus neocallosus O'Brien, 1981
- Listronotus nevadicus LeConte, 1876
- Listronotus nigropunctatus (Suffrian, 1870)
- Listronotus novellus (Blatchley, 1916)
- Listronotus obliquus LeConte, J.L., 1876 synonym of L. sordidus
- Listronotus obscurellus (Dietz, 1889)
- Listronotus obtectus (Dietz, 1889)
- Listronotus oregonensis (LeConte, 1857) (carrot weevil)
- Listronotus pallidus O'Brien, 1981
- Listronotus pallious O'brien, 1977
- Listronotus palustris Blatchley, 1916
- Listronotus peninsularis (Blatchley, 1916)
- Listronotus plumosiventris O'brien, 1977
- Listronotus porcellus (Say, 1831)
- Listronotus poseyensis (Blatchley, 1920)
- Listronotus pseudosetosus O'Brien, 1981
- Listronotus punctiger LeConte, 1876
- Listronotus rotundicollis LeConte, 1876
- Listronotus rubtzoffi O'Brien, 1981
- Listronotus rudipennis Blatchley & Leng, 1916 synonym of L. oregonensis
- Listronotus salicorniae O'Brien, 1981
- Listronotus scapularis Casey, 1895
- Listronotus setosus LeConte, 1876
- Listronotus similis Henderson, 1940
- Listronotus sordidus (Gyllenhal, 1834)
- Listronotus sparsus (Say, 1831)
- Listronotus squamiger (Say, 1831)
- Listronotus sulcirostris LeConte, J.L., 1876
- Listronotus suturalis O'Brien, 1981
- Listronotus teretirostris (LeConte, 1857)
- Listronotus tessellatus Casey, T.L., 1895 synonym of L. oregonensis
- Listronotus texanus (Stockton, 1963)
- Listronotus truncatus (Hatch, 1971)
- Listronotus tuberosus LeConte, 1876
- Listronotus turbatus O'Brien, 1981
- Listronotus vitticollis (Kirby, 1837)
- Listronotus wallacei (Stockton, 1963)
