= Bumstead =

Bumstead or Bumsted may refer to:

== People ==
- Albert H. Bumstead (1875–1940), American cartographer and inventor
- Brad Bumsted, American journalist
- Charles Bumstead (1922–1974), English footballer
- Christine Bumstead (born 1995), Canadian ice hockey coach
- Eudora Stone Bumstead (1860–1892), American poet and hymn writer
- Henry A. Bumstead (1870–1920), American physicist
- Henry Bumstead (1915–2006), American cinematic art director and production designer
- Horace Bumstead (1841–1919), Congregationalist minister and educator
- John Bumstead (born 1958), English footballer
- Jon Bumstead (born 1957), American politician

== Other uses ==
- Dagwood Bumstead, a cartoon character
- Bumstead Records, a Canadian record label
- Mount Bumstead, a mountain in Antarctica
