= Ashworth Glacier =

Glacier in Antarctica

- Location within Antarctica
- Location: Ross Dependency
- Coordinates: 85°01′36″S 169°15′53″E
- Terminus: Mill Glacier

Ashworth Glacier (85°01′36″S 169°15′53″E) is an Antarctic glacier with sharply delineated sides, flowing west from Supporters Range into Mill Glacier, 5 kilometres (3 mi) north of Mount Iveagh. It was named by the Advisory Committee on Antarctic Names in 2007, after Allan C. Ashworth, Professor of Paleontology and Stratigraphy at North Dakota State University. He discovered the only yet known fly and beetle fossils in Antarctica in the nearby Dominion Range.

== See also ==
- List of glaciers in the Antarctic
- Glaciology
