= Meyer Desert =

Ice-free area in Antarctica

Coordinates: 85°8′S 166°45′E

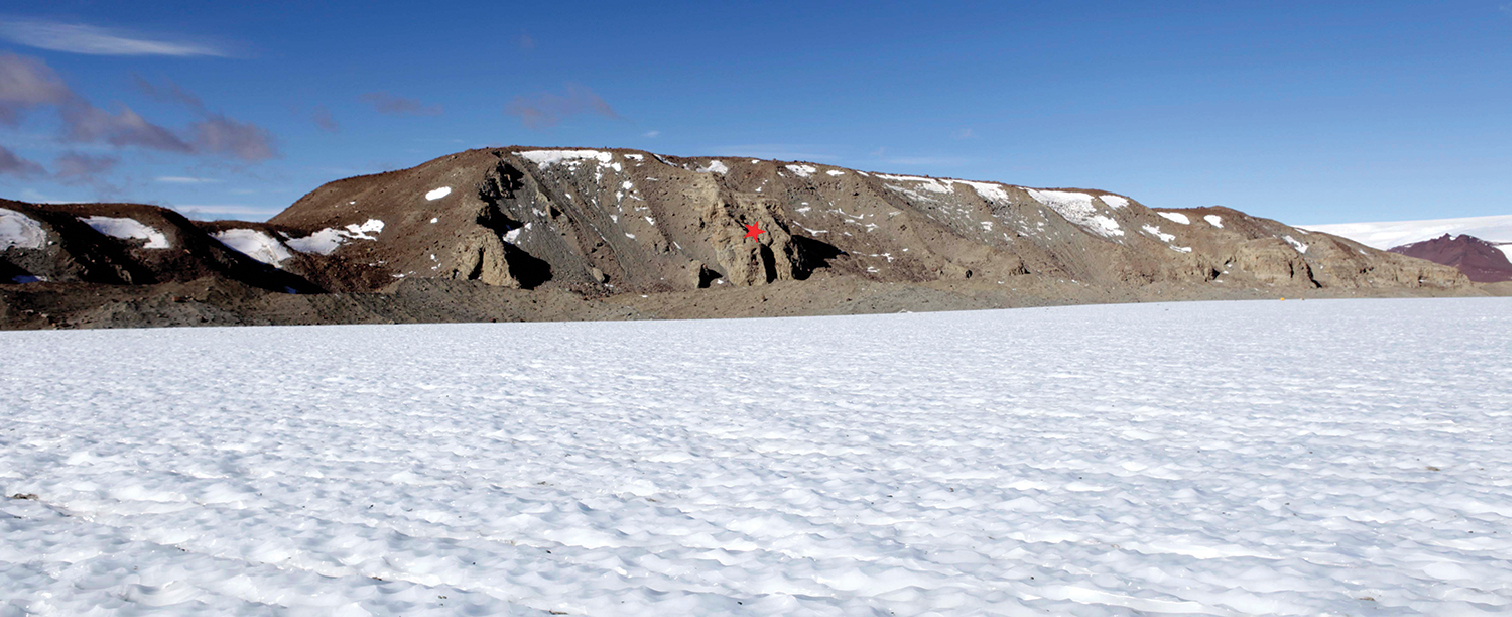
Meyer Desert Formation

The Meyer Desert is a triangular ice-free area of about 50 square miles (130 km^{2}) at the northern end of the Dominion Range, Antarctica, near the confluence of Beardmore Glacier and Mill Glacier. It was named by the New Zealand Geological Survey Antarctic Expedition of 1961–62 for George Meyer of the United States Antarctic Research Program, who was scientific leader at McMurdo Station in 1961, and led a field party into this area in the summer of 1961–62.

A paper from 2003 reports the discovery of the first freshwater mollusc remains from Antarctica in the Meyer Desert Formation. These include both an unidentified fragmentary lymnaeid (a freshwater snail), and an unidentified true Pisidium (a freshwater bivalve).
