= List of Listroderes species =

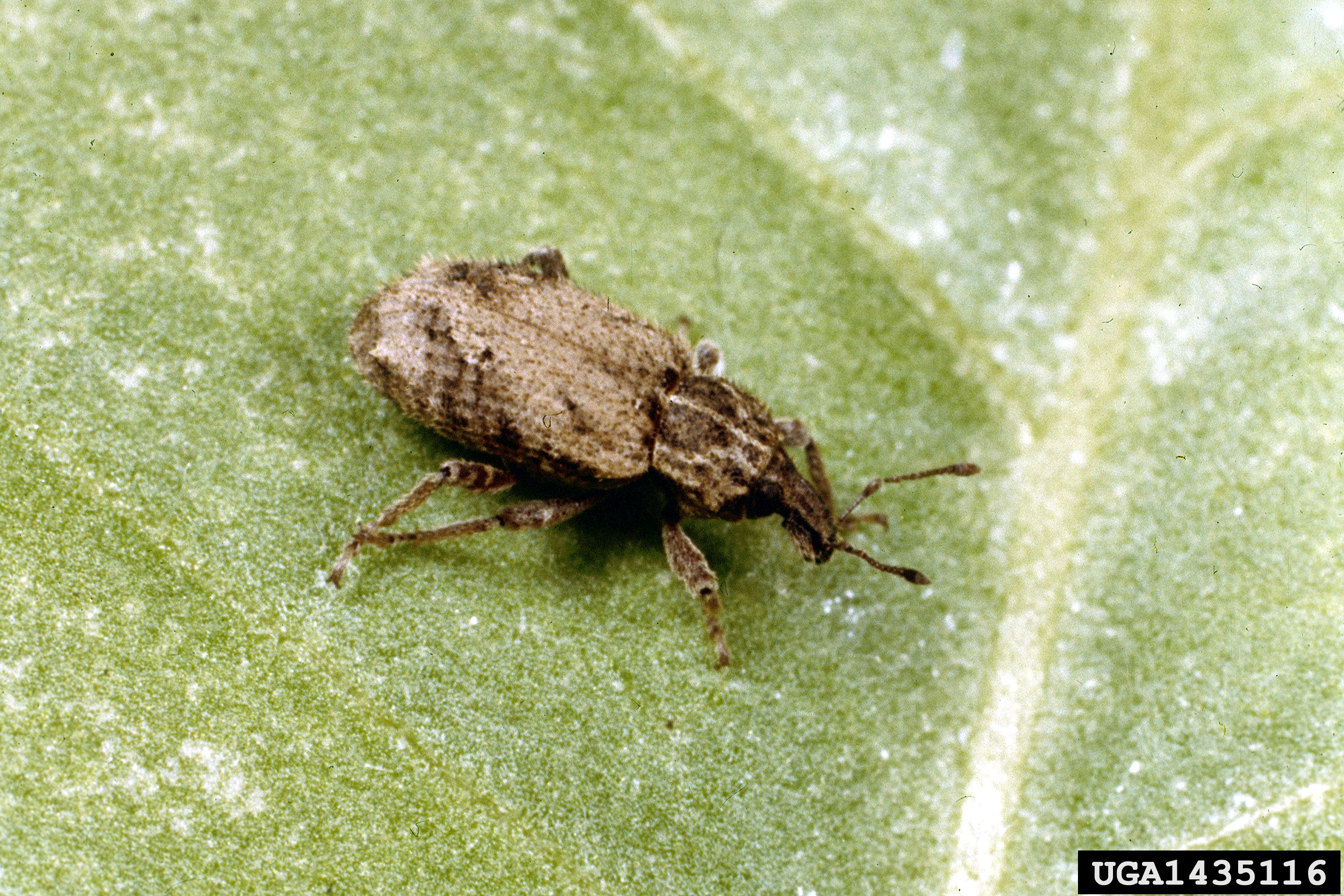
Listroderes costirostris

Listroderes is a genus of underwater weevils, subfamily Cyclominae, in the beetle family Curculionidae. There are more than 184 described species in the genus Listroderes.

== A ==
- Listroderes abditus Enderl., 1907
- Listroderes acutesquamosus Germain, P., 1895
- Listroderes aequivocus Kuschel, 1946
- Listroderes affinis Hustache, 1926
- Listroderes albescens Blanchard, E. in Gay, 1851
- Listroderes angulipennis Germain, P., 1895
- Listroderes angusticeps Blanchard, E. in Gay, 1851
- Listroderes annulipes Blanchard, E. in Gay, 1851
- Listroderes antarcticus Germain, P., 1895
- Listroderes apicalis Waterhouse, 1842
- Listroderes appendiculatus Boheman, 1842
- Listroderes araucanus Germain, P., 1895
- Listroderes argentinensis Hustache, 1926
- Listroderes attenuatus Germain, P., 1895

== B ==
- Listroderes balfourbrownei Kuschel, 1952
- Listroderes biangulatus Champion, 1918
- Listroderes bicallosus Wibmer & O'Brien, 1986
- Listroderes bicaudatus Enderl., 1907
- Listroderes bidentatus Kuschel, 1955
- Listroderes bimaculatus Boheman, 1842
- Listroderes binodosus Germain, P., 1895
- Listroderes boliviensis Hustache, 1924
- Listroderes bracteatus Enderl., 1907
- Listroderes brevirostris Wibmer & O'Brien, 1986
- Listroderes brevisetis Hustache, 1926
- Listroderes bruchi Hustache, 1926

== C ==
- Listroderes carinicollis Germain, P., 1895
- Listroderes caudatus Gyllenhal, 1834
- Listroderes caudiculatus Germain, P., 1895
- Listroderes chalceatus Blanchard, E. in Gay, 1851
- Listroderes charybdis Morrone, 1993
- Listroderes chilensis Germain, P., 1895
- Listroderes cinerarius Blanchard, E. in Gay, 1851
- Listroderes cinerascens Blanchard, E. in Gay, 1851
- Listroderes comatus Erichson, W., 1847
- Listroderes compressiventris Enderl., 1907
- Listroderes confusus Hustache, 1926
- Listroderes corralensis Germain, P., 1895
- Listroderes costirostris Schoenherr, 1823
- Listroderes costulatus Germain, P., 1895
- Listroderes cupreosquamosus Germain, P., 1895
- Listroderes curvipes Germain, P., 1895
- Listroderes delaiguei Germain, P., 1895

== D–E ==
- Listroderes caudatus Gyllenhal, 1834
- Listroderes dentipennis Germain, P., 1895
- Listroderes desertorum Germain, P., 1895
- †Listroderes differens (Wickham, 1912)
- Listroderes difficilis Germain, P., 1895
- Listroderes dissimilis Fairmaire, L., 1885
- Listroderes distinguendus Gyllenhal, 1834
- Listroderes divaricatus Enderl., 1907
- Listroderes dubius Germain, P., 1896
- Listroderes elegans Hustache, 1926
- Listroderes ellipticus Hustache, 1926
- Listroderes erinaceus Germain, P., 1895
- †Listroderes evisceratus (Scudder, 1893)
- Listroderes exsculpticollis Enderl., 1907

== F–G ==
- Listroderes falklandicus Enderl., 1907
- Listroderes fallax Germain, P., 1895
- Listroderes fasciculiger Blanchard, E. in Gay, 1851
- Listroderes fascioliger Blanchard, E. in Gay, 1851
- Listroderes foveatus Kuschel, 1955
- Listroderes fragariae Schenkling, S. & Marshall, G.A.K., 1931
- Listroderes frigidus Germain, P., 1896
- Listroderes fulvicornis Germain, P., 1895
- Listroderes fulvipes Guérin-Méneville, 1839
- Listroderes fulvitarsis Hustache, 1926
- Listroderes gibber Enderl., 1907
- Listroderes gracilicornis Germain, P., 1895
- Listroderes griseonotatus Champion, 1918
- Listroderes griseus Germain, P., 1896
- Listroderes griseus Guérin-Méneville, 1839

== H–K ==
- Listroderes hispidus Germain, P., 1896
- Listroderes histrio Germain, P., 1895
- Listroderes hoffmanni Germain, P., 1895
- Listroderes horridus Germain, P., 18896
- Listroderes howdenae Morrone, 1993
- Listroderes humilis Gyllenhal, 1834
- Listroderes hyadesi Fairmaire, L., 1885
- Listroderes hypocritus Hustache, 1926
- Listroderes immundus Boheman, 1842
- Listroderes inaequalipennis Boheman, 1842
- Listroderes inaequalis Germain, P., 1896
- Listroderes inaequatus Schenkling, S. & Marshall, G.A.K., 1931
- Listroderes incanus Kuschel in Wibmer & O'Brien, 1986
- Listroderes incertus Germain, P., 1896
- Listroderes inconspicuus Olliff, A.S. in Whymper, 1892
- Listroderes insquamea Enderl., 1907
- Listroderes insubidus Schoenherr, 1823
- Listroderes katerensis Champion, 1918

== M ==
- Listroderes lacunosus Fairmaire, L., 1885
- Listroderes laevigatus Germain, P., 1896
- Listroderes laevirostris Germain, P., 1895
- Listroderes latiusculus Boheman, 1842
- Listroderes lemniscatus Champion, G.C., 1918
- Listroderes levicula Kuschel, 1952
- Listroderes liliputanus Germain, P., 1895
- Listroderes lineatulus Say, 1831
- Listroderes lugens Germain, P., 1895
- Listroderes lugubris Germain, P., 1895
- Listroderes magellanicus Germain, P., 1895
- Listroderes medianus Schenkling, S. & Marshall, G.A.K., 1931
- Listroderes migropunctatus Suffrian, 1871
- Listroderes montanus Germain, P., 1895
- Listroderes murinus Germain, P., 1896
- Listroderes mus Germain, P., 1895

== N–O ==
- Listroderes nigrinus Fairmaire, L., 1883
- Listroderes nigrinus Germain, P., 1896
- Listroderes nodifer Boheman, 1842
- Listroderes nordenskiöldi Enderl., 1907
- Listroderes novicus Schenkling, S. & Marshall, G.A.K., 1931
- Listroderes obliqua Kuschel, 1950
- Listroderes obliquus Dejean,
- Listroderes obliquus Gyllenhal, 1834
- Listroderes obliquus Klug, J.C.F., 1829
- Listroderes obrieni Morrone, 1993
- Listroderes obscurus Germain, P., 1896
- Listroderes omissa Kuschel, 1952
- Listroderes oregonensis LeConte, J.L., 1857
- Listroderes ovatus Boheman, 1842

== P ==
- Listroderes paranensis Hustache, 1926
- Listroderes parvulus Germain, P., 1896
- Listroderes percostatus Fairmaire, L. et Germain, P., 1860
- Listroderes philippii Germain, P., 1896
- Listroderes pilosissimus Schenkling, S. & Marshall, G.A.K., 1931
- Listroderes pilosus Boheman, 1842
- Listroderes pilosus Waterhouse, 1841
- Listroderes planicollis Blanchard, E. in Gay, 1851
- Listroderes planipennis Blanchard, E. in Gay, 1851
- Listroderes porcellus Gyllenhal, 1834
- Listroderes porcellus Say, 1831
- Listroderes praemorsus Schenkling, S. & Marshall, G.A.K., 1931
- Listroderes proximus Germain, P., 1895
- Listroderes pubescens Germain, P., 1895
- Listroderes punctatissimus Olliff, A.S. in Whymper, 1892
- Listroderes punctiventris Germain, P., 1895
- Listroderes punicola Kuschel, 1949
- Listroderes pusillus Hustache, 1926

== Q–R ==
- Listroderes quadrituberculatus Champion, 1918
- Listroderes reticulatus Germain, P., 1895
- Listroderes robustior Schenkling, S. & Marshall, G.A.K., 1931
- Listroderes robustus Germain, P., 1895
- Listroderes robustus Waterhouse, 1842
- Listroderes rugipennis Blanchard, E. in Gay, 1851

== S ==
- Listroderes salebrosus Enderl., 1907
- Listroderes scabra Enderl., 1907
- Listroderes schythei Germain, P., 1895
- Listroderes scylla Morrone, 1993
- Listroderes sobrinus Germain, P., 1896
- Listroderes solutus Boheman, 1842
- Listroderes sordidus Gyllenhal, 1834
- Listroderes sparsus Gyllenhal, 1834
- Listroderes sparsus Say, 1831
- Listroderes spoliatus Germain, P., 1896
- Listroderes spurcus Boheman, 1842
- Listroderes squalidus Gyllenhal, 1834
- Listroderes squamiger Gyllenhal, 1834
- Listroderes squamiger Say, 1831
- Listroderes squamirostris Germain, P., 1896
- Listroderes sticticus Germain, P., 1895
- Listroderes subaeneus Germain, P., 1895
- Listroderes subcinctus Boheman, 1842
- Listroderes subcostatus Waterhouse, 1842
- Listroderes superbus Reed, 1872

== T–U ==
- Listroderes teretirostris LeConte, J.L., 1857
- Listroderes thermarum Germain, P., 1895
- Listroderes trichophorus Philippi, F., 1887
- Listroderes tristis Germain, P., 1895
- Listroderes trivialis Germain, P., 1895
- Listroderes tuberculifer Blanchard, E. in Gay, 1851
- Listroderes ursinus Germain, P., 1896
- Listroderes uruguayensis Kuschel, 1952

== V–W ==
- Listroderes v.caudiculatus Fairmaire, L., 1890
- Listroderes varicosus Blanchard, E. in Gay, 1851
- Listroderes verrucosus Germain, P., 1896
- Listroderes vicinus Hustache, 1926
- Listroderes victus Germain, P., 1896
- Listroderes vittatus Guérin-Méneville, 1839
- Listroderes vulgaris Germain, P., 1896
- Listroderes vulsus Enderl., 1907
- Listroderes wagneri Hustache, 1926
- Listroderes wittei Hustache, 1926
