= Meyer Desert Formation =

- Stratigraphic range: Miocene or Pliocene
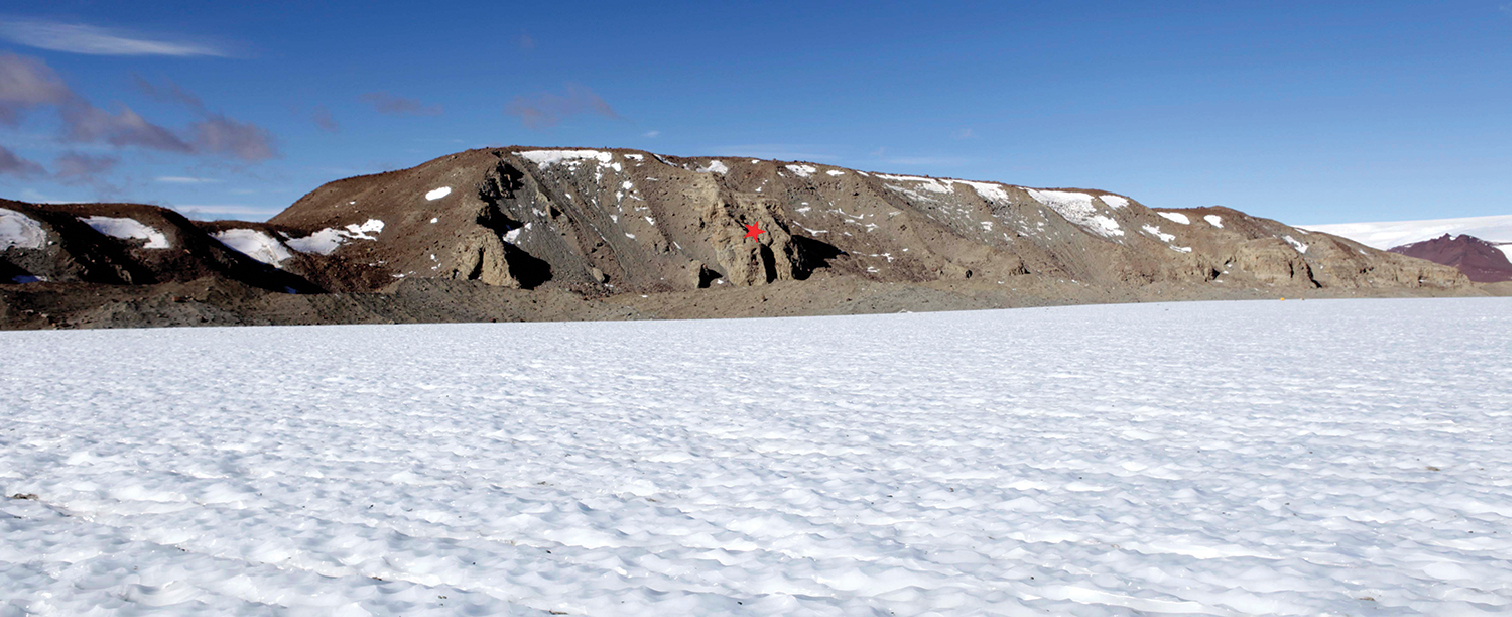
- Meyer Desert Formation exposed in the Oliver Bluffs on the flanks of the Beardmore Glacier
- Type: Geological formation
- Unit of: Sirius Group
- Overlies: Cloudmaker Formation
- Thickness: 185 m (607 ft)

Lithology
- Primary: Diamictite, sandstone, siltstone
- Other: Peat, marlstone

Location
- Coordinates: 85°07′S 166°35′E
- Region: Transantarctic Mountains, Meyer Desert, Dominion Range
- Country: Antarctica
- Extent: Oliver Bluffs, Beardmore Glacier region

Type section
- Named for: Meyer Desert
- Named by: McKelvey et al., 1991

The Meyer Desert Formation is a glacigenic, mostly non-marine sedimentary sequence that forms the upper part of the Sirius Group in the central Transantarctic Mountains. It is notable for containing the youngest known macrofossils of terrestrial plants and palaeosols found anywhere in Antarctica, preserved at elevations of ~1,760 m above sea level and approximately 500 km from the South Pole. Some earlier works included it within a broader “Sirius Formation,” but this usage has been largely abandoned.

== Biota ==
The area was the frontline of a major glacier in a marine-influenced Fjord, whose best analogue is Glacier Bay National Park.

The Meyer Desert Formation preserves a short-lived Pliocene interglacial tundra in a marine-influenced Fjord. Mean summer temperatures reached ~4–5 °C for 1–2 months, with 24-hour daylight, permafrost, strong katabatic winds, very low precipitation, and a growing season of only 6–12 weeks.

The landscape was a low-relief, gravelly braided outwash plain with unstable moraines, scattered shallow ponds, and thin peat lenses. Vegetation consisted of prostrate Nothofagus shrubs, dense vascular cushion plants up to 30 cm across, moss hummocks, scattered buttercups, sedges, and rare mare's-tail in wet hollows. This setting was similar floral-wise to the windswept cushion bush and fellfields of Patagonia and Tierra del Fuego above 800–1000 m. The sequence hovewer was coastal, based on marine Diatom & Foraminifera, part of the "Beardmore Paleofjord", a major seaway extending at least 165 km through the Transantarctic Mountains from its juncture with the S Ross Sea, with the floral levels being probably a shoreline of an smaller inland sea incursion, whose best analogue is Glacier Bay National Park.

Fossil Nothofagus leaves show that intermittent warm periods allowed Nothofagus shrubs to cling to the Dominion Range as late as 3-4 Ma (mid-late Pliocene). After that, the Pleistocene glaciation covered the whole continent with ice and destroyed all major plant life on it. More recent data records similar floras at least until the Miocene in the Antarctic Peninsula. The Pliocene age of the sediments has been constested, with two major options, one being periods were the Wilkes & Aurora subglacial basins were ice-free and sea-inundated as recent as the early Pliocene, and the other suggesting is Miocene or older, and it´s Diatoms are wind contamination. Extant Springtails (Antarcticinella, Cryptopygus, Gomphiocephalus) that still live in the same region suggest hovewer that the ice covering of the region wasn´t until the Pliocene, as they have been isolated from each other at between 1.3 and 5.5 My.

=== Animals ===
Genus	Species	Affinity / family	Image
Antarctotrechus	balli	Carabidae	Antarctotrechus
Chironomidae indet.	Indet.	Midge	
Curculionidae indet.	"Morphotype 1"	Listroderini (aff. Listroderes)	Listroderes
Curculionidae indet.	"Morphotype 2"	Listroderini (aff. Falklandius/Telurus)	Telurus dissimilis
Cyclorrhapha indet.	Indet.	aff. Cochliomyia	Cochliomyia
Cyclorrhapha indet.	Indet.	Leg inside Ranunculus achene	Cochliomyia
Lepidoptera? indet.	Indet.	Eggs of Moth or Butterfly	
Lymnaeidae indet.	Indet.	aff. Chilina	Chilina
Osteichthyes indet.	Indet.	Freshwater taxon, likely a Galaxiidae	
Ostracod indet.	Indet.	Putatively non-marine ostracods	
Pisidium	sp.	Sphaeriidae	Pisidium

=== Plants ===
Genus	Species	Affinity / family	Image
Cushion plants indet.	Indet.	Donatiaceae, Apiaceae, Caryophyllaceae or Asteraceae	
Cyperaceae indet.	"Morphotype 1"	Sedges	
Cyperaceae indet.	"Morphotype 2"	Sedges	
Hippuris	sp.	Hippuridaceae	Hippuris
Marchantiaceae indet.	Indet.	Liverwort	
Nothofagidites	(Fuscospora) lachmaniae	Nothofagaceae (cf. Nothofagus)	Nothofagus gunnii
Nothofagus	beardmorensis	Nothofagaceae (aff. Nothofagus gunnii)	Nothofagus gunnii
Poaceae indet.	Indet.	Grass	
Podocarpidites	"sp. b"	Podocarpaceae (Aff. Pilgerodendron or Lepidothamnus)	Pilgerodendron
Pottiaceae indet.	Indet.	Moss, other 4 unnamed types are found	
Ranunculus	sp.	Ranunculaceae	Ranunculus
Reniform seed indet.	Indet.	?Chenopodiaceae, ?Caryophyllaceae or ?Myrtaceae	
Tricolpites	sp.	Polygonaceae or Lamiaceae	
Tricolpites	"sp. 2"	Polygonaceae or Lamiaceae	
