= Sun compass =

Sun compass may refer to:

- Sun compass in animals, the innate ability of some animals to orientate themselves by the sun
- Solar compass, a 19th-century surveying instrument that made use of the sun's direction
- Bumstead sun compass, a navigational device invented in the 1920s by Albert H. Bumstead
