= Nothofagus beardmorensis =

Nothofagus beardmorensis Temporal range: Piacenzian

Scientific classification
- Kingdom: Plantae
- Clade: Tracheophytes
- Clade: Angiosperms
- Clade: Eudicots
- Clade: Rosids
- Order: Fagales
- Family: Nothofagaceae
- Genus: Nothofagus
- Species: N. beardmorensis

Binomial name
- Nothofagus beardmorensis Hill, Harwood et Webb

Extinct species of flowering plant

Nothofagus beardmorensis was a species of plant, fossils of which have been found in Late Pliocene rocks of the Meyer Desert Formation in the Dominion Range of the Transantarctic Mountains.
