= Mount Saunders =

Mount Saunders may refer to:

- Mount Saunders (Antarctic), a mountain peak in the Dominion Range in the Antarctic
- Mount Saunders (Northern Territory), also known as Nhulun, a hill behind the town of Nhulunbuy, Northern Territory of Australia
