= Squamiger =

Squamiger may refer to:

- Aedes squamiger, species of mosquito in the family Culicidae
- Langelurillus squamiger, species of jumping spider in the family Salticidae
- Listronotus squamiger, species of underwater weevil in the beetle family Curculionidae
- Pseudomogoplistes squamiger, species of apterous cricket in the family Mogoplistidae
- Turbo squamiger, species of sea snail, marine gastropod mollusk in the family Turbinidae
