= Riddiford =

Riddiford may refer to:

Antarctic landform:

- Riddiford Nunatak in the Churchill Mountains, Oates Land

People:

- Charles Ernest Riddiford (1897–1968), Cartographer and typeface designer at National Geographic Society
- Dan Riddiford (1914–1974), New Zealand politician
- Edward Riddiford (1842–1911), New Zealand farmer and runholder, known as "King" Riddiford
- Earle Riddiford (1921–1989), New Zealand lawyer and mountain climber
- Lynn Riddiford (b. 1936), American entomologist and biologist
