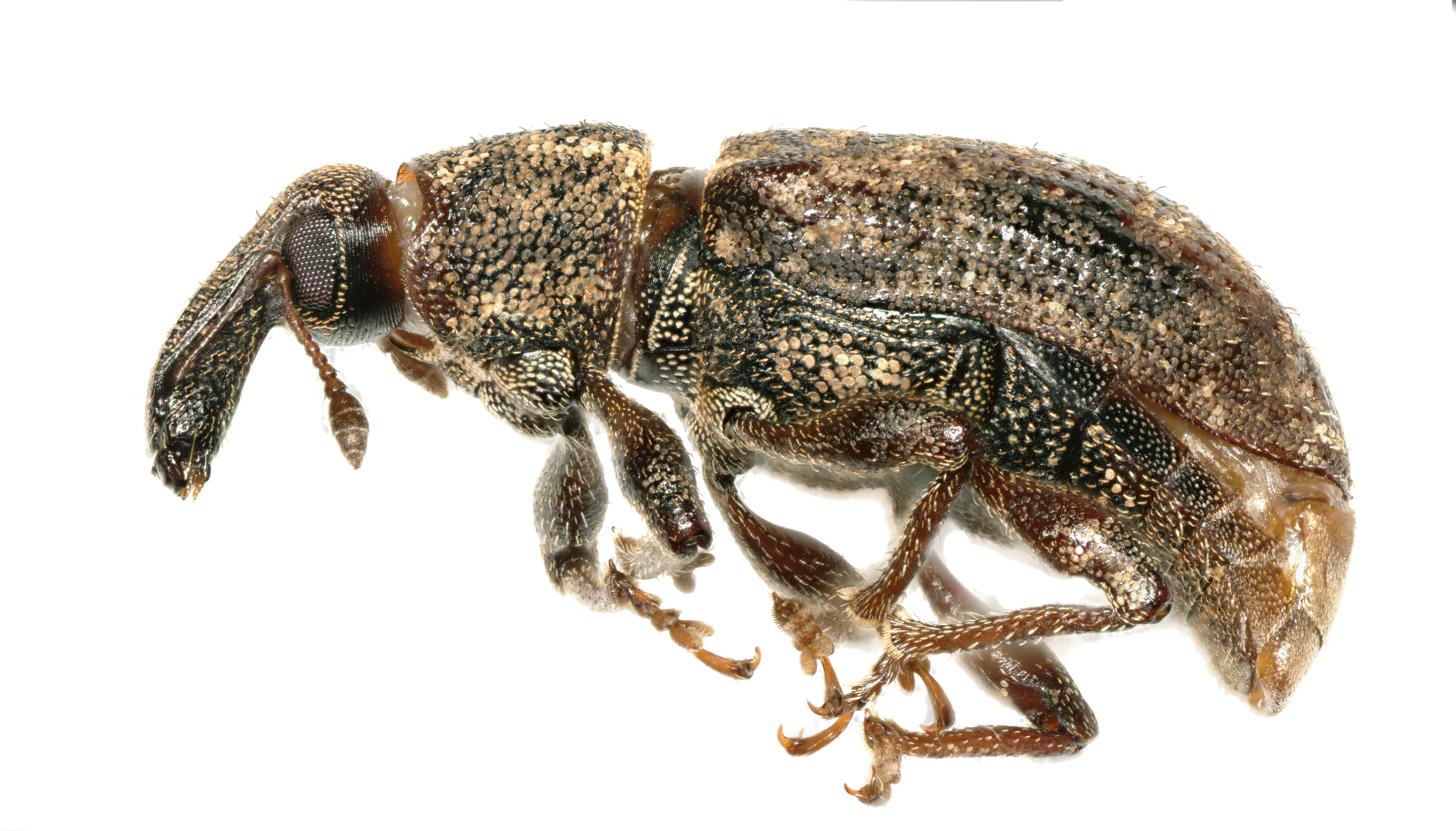
- Listronotus oregonensis

Scientific classification
- Kingdom: Animalia
- Phylum: Arthropoda
- Class: Insecta
- Order: Coleoptera
- Suborder: Polyphaga
- Infraorder: Cucujiformia
- Family: Curculionidae
- Subfamily: Cyclominae
- Tribe: Listroderini; Le Conte, 1876

= Listroderini =

Tribe of beetles

Listroderini is a tribe of weevils.

== Subtribes ==
After Morrone (2013).

- Macrostyphlina Morrone, 2013
  - Adioristidius
  - Amathynetoides
  - Andesianellus
  - Macrostyphlus
  - Nacodius
  - Puranius
- Palaechthina Brinck, 1948
  - Anorthorhinus
  - Gunodes
  - Haversiella
  - Inaccodes
  - Listronotus
  - Neopachytychius
  - Palaechthus
  - Palaechtodes
  - Steriphus
  - Tristanodes
- Falklandiina Morrone, 2013
  - Falklandiellus
  - Falklandiopsis
  - Falklandius
  - Gromilus
  - Lanteriella
  - Liparogetus
  - Nestrius
  - Telurus
- Listroderina LeConte, 1876
  - Acroriellus
  - Acrorius
  - Acrostomus
  - Antarctobius
  - Germainiellus
  - Hyperoides
  - Lamiarhinus
  - Listroderes
  - Methypora
  - Philippius
  - Rupanius
  - Trachodema
