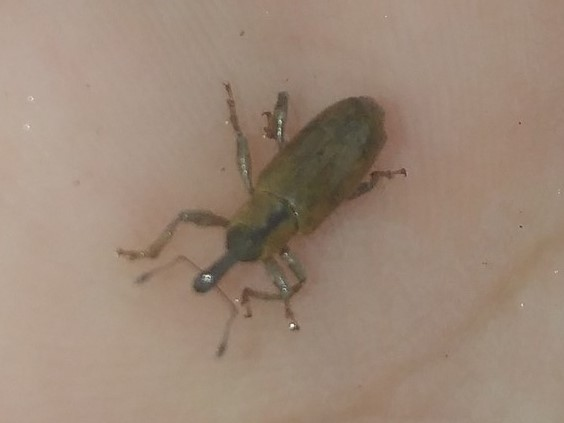

Scientific classification
- Domain: Eukaryota
- Kingdom: Animalia
- Phylum: Arthropoda
- Class: Insecta
- Order: Coleoptera
- Suborder: Polyphaga
- Infraorder: Cucujiformia
- Family: Curculionidae
- Genus: Listronotus
- Species: L. elongatus

Binomial name
- Listronotus elongatus (Hustache, 1939)

= Listronotus elongatus =

Weevil species

Listronotus elongatus is a species of weevil native to South America, of the genus of underwater weevils Listronotus. It lays eggs on and eats the invasive floating pennywort. The larvae also eat into the stems, reducing the pennywort's ability to grow.

Despite not being native to Britain, it has been introduced into waterways in Britain for biocontrol of the floating pennywort, following extensive research to establish that the weevil is not a threat in itself.
