= Listronotus suturalis =

Scientific classification
- Domain: Eukaryota
- Kingdom: Animalia
- Phylum: Arthropoda
- Class: Insecta
- Order: Coleoptera
- Suborder: Polyphaga
- Infraorder: Cucujiformia
- Family: Curculionidae
- Genus: Listronotus
- Species: L. suturalis

Binomial name
- Listronotus suturalis O'Brien, 1981

Species of beetle

Listronotus suturalis is a species of underwater weevil in the family Curculionidae. It is found in North America.
