= Listronotus appendiculatus =

Scientific classification
- Kingdom: Animalia
- Phylum: Arthropoda
- Class: Insecta
- Order: Coleoptera
- Suborder: Polyphaga
- Infraorder: Cucujiformia
- Family: Curculionidae
- Genus: Listronotus
- Species: L. appendiculatus

Binomial name
- Listronotus appendiculatus (Boheman, 1842)

Synonyms
- Listronotus floridensis Blatchley, 1916; Listronotus impressus Van Dyke, 1929; Listronotus leucozonatus Chittenden, 1926

Species of beetle

Listronotus appendiculatus is a species of underwater weevil in the beetle family Curculionidae. It is found in North America.
