= Listronotus distinctus =

Scientific classification
- Domain: Eukaryota
- Kingdom: Animalia
- Phylum: Arthropoda
- Class: Insecta
- Order: Coleoptera
- Suborder: Polyphaga
- Infraorder: Cucujiformia
- Family: Curculionidae
- Genus: Listronotus
- Species: L. distinctus

Binomial name
- Listronotus distinctus Henderson, 1940

Species of beetle

Listronotus distinctus is a species of underwater weevil in the family Curculionidae. It is found in North America.
