= Listronotus sordidus =

Scientific classification
- Kingdom: Animalia
- Phylum: Arthropoda
- Class: Insecta
- Order: Coleoptera
- Suborder: Polyphaga
- Infraorder: Cucujiformia
- Family: Curculionidae
- Genus: Listronotus
- Species: L. sordidus

Binomial name
- Listronotus sordidus (Gyllenhal, 1834)

Synonyms
- Listroderes distinguendus Gyllenhal, 1834; Listronotus obliquus LeConte, 1876

Species of beetle

Listronotus sordidus is a species of underwater weevil in the beetle family Curculionidae. It is found in North America.
