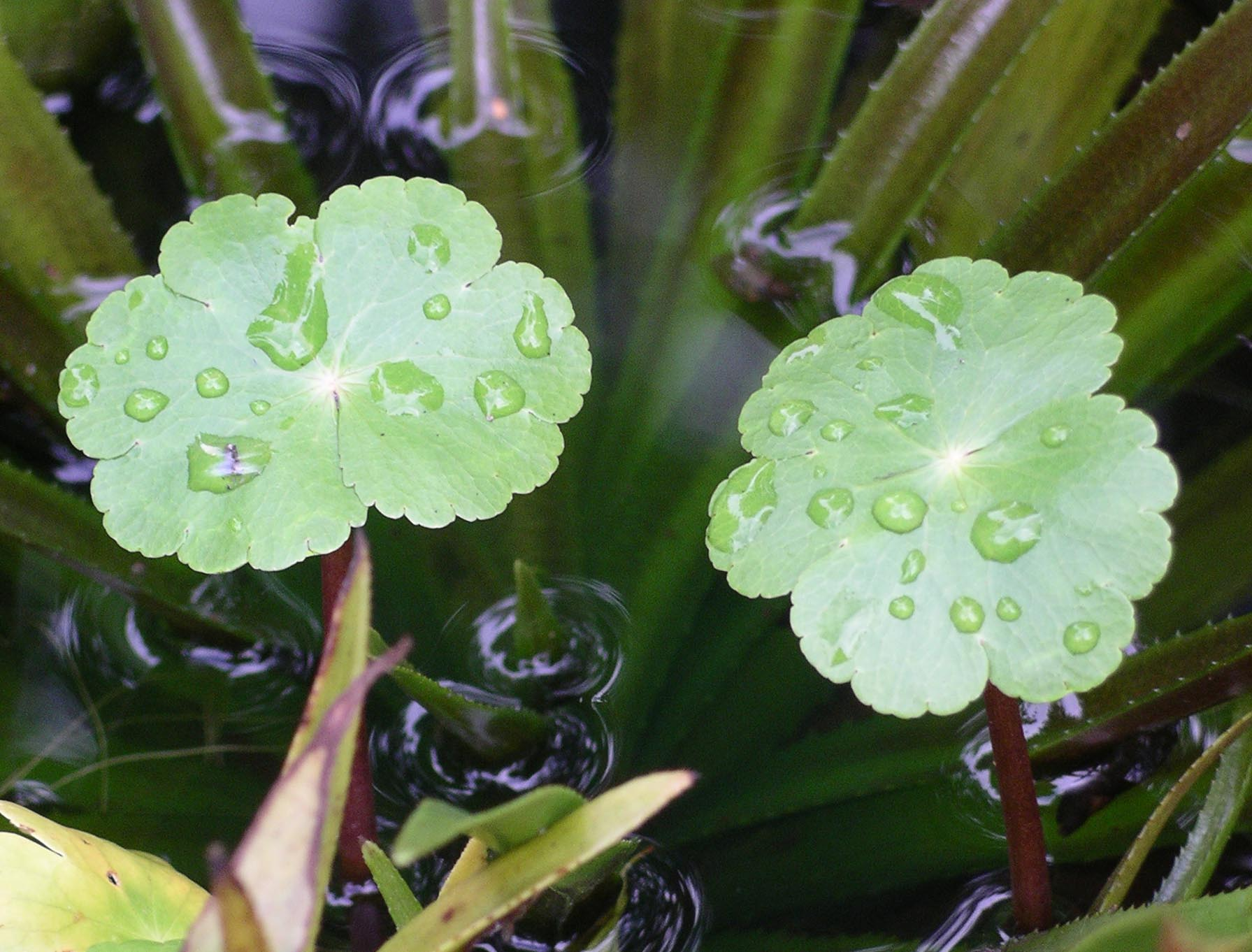

Scientific classification
- Kingdom: Plantae
- Clade: Embryophytes
- Clade: Tracheophytes
- Clade: Spermatophytes
- Clade: Angiosperms
- Clade: Eudicots
- Clade: Asterids
- Order: Apiales
- Family: Araliaceae
- Genus: Hydrocotyle
- Species: H. ranunculoides

Binomial name
- Hydrocotyle ranunculoides L.f.

= Hydrocotyle ranunculoides =

Species of plant

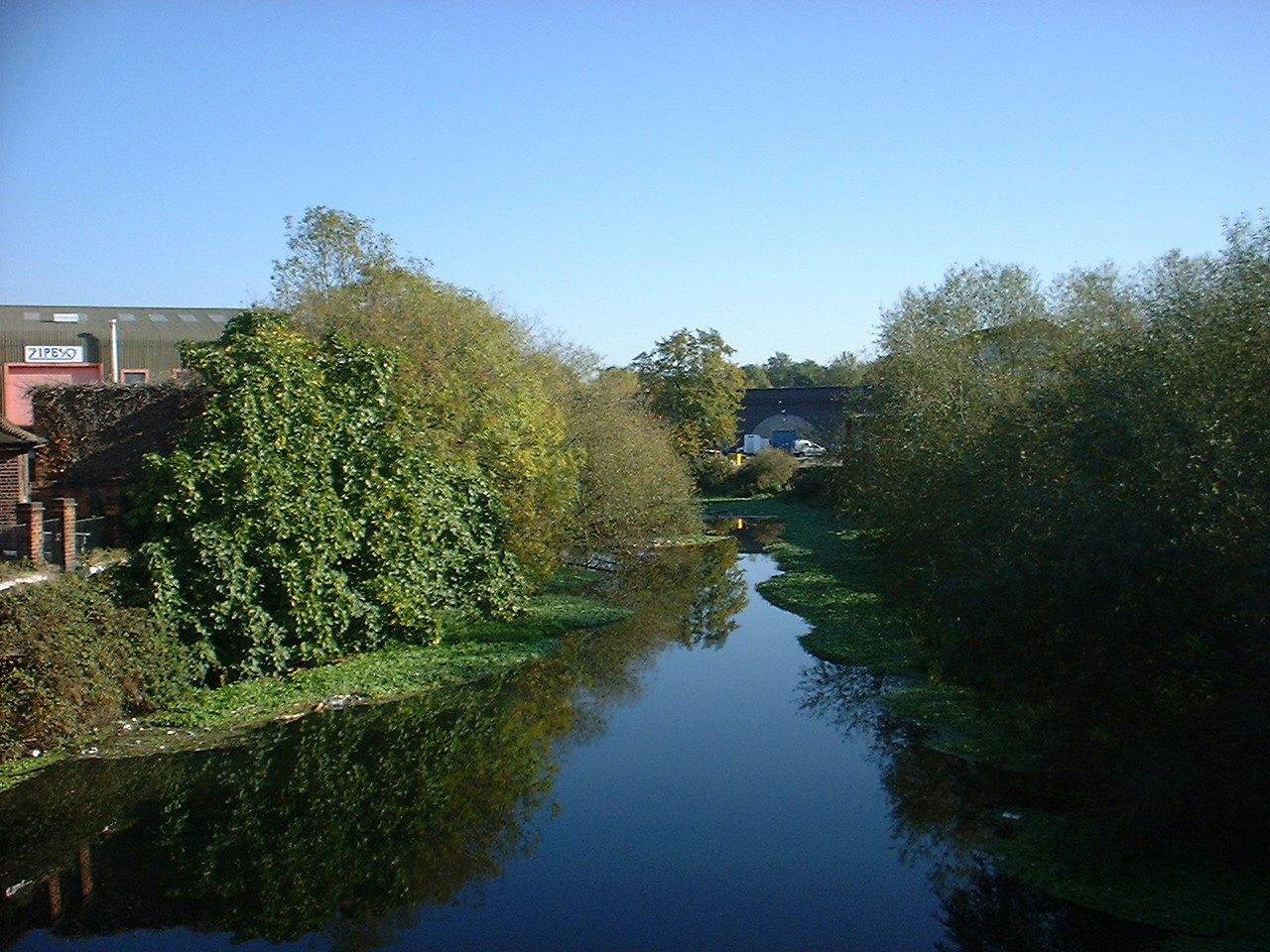
Floating pennywort infestation in the River Soar, Leicester

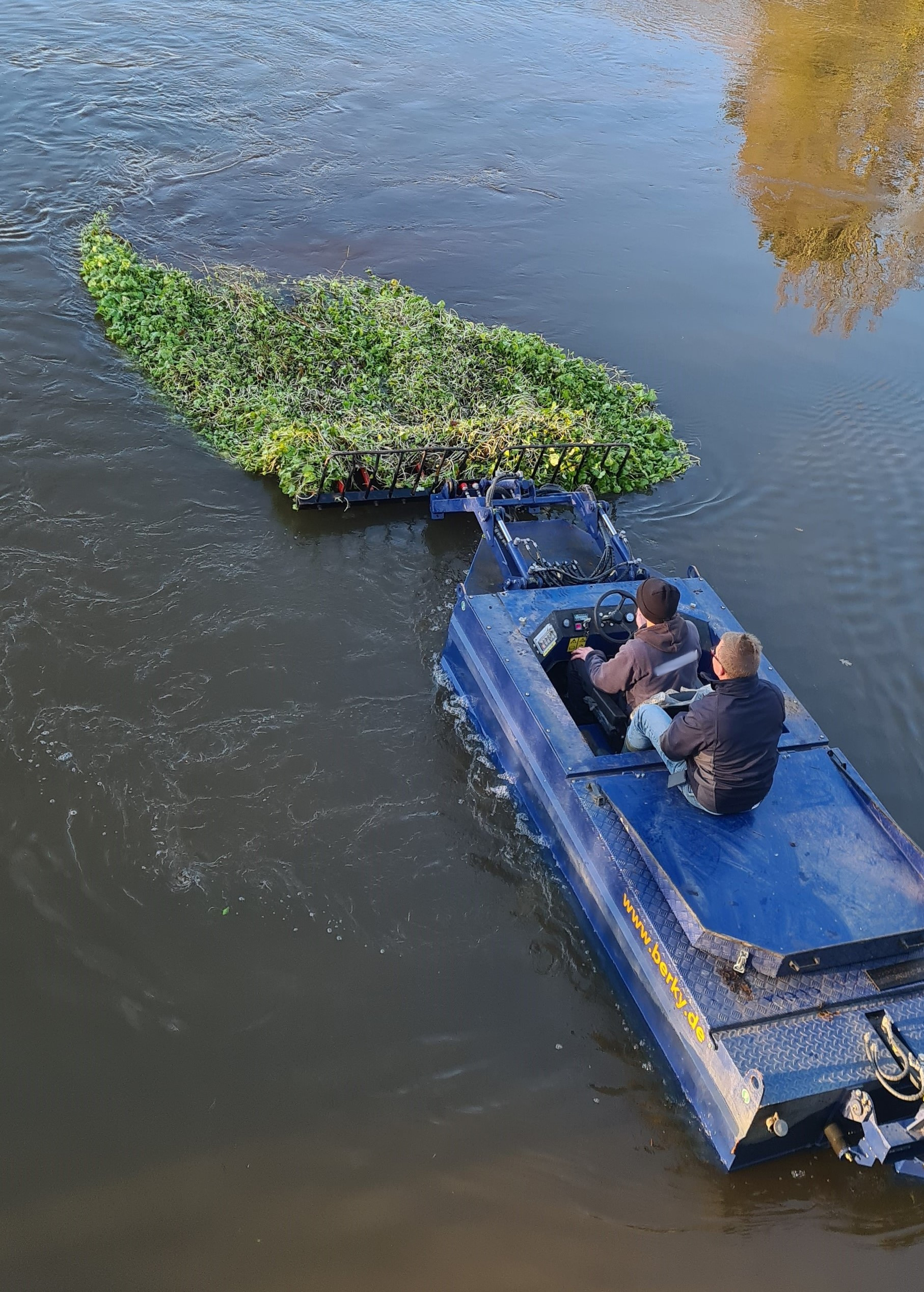
Collecting the floating pennywort with a mowing boat in Germany

Hydrocotyle ranunculoides, commonly known as floating pennywort, or floating marshpennywort, is an aquatic plant in the family Araliaceae. It is native to North and South America.

== Origin and invasiveness ==
Water pennywort is an aquatic plant, native to the Americas. Due to its popularity as a pond plant, and subsequent escape into rivers, it has established as an invasive alien species in parts of Europe, Australia, Africa and Japan. It was one of five aquatic plants which were banned from sale in the UK from April 2014, and was the first prohibition of its kind there. On the other hand, it is in decline in parts of its range in the United States.

In Europe, floating pennywort is included since 2016 in the list of invasive alien species of Union concern (the Union list). This stipulates that this species cannot be imported, cultivated, transported, commercialized, planted, or intentionally released into the environment in the whole of the European Union.

== Description ==
Water pennywort has stems that spread horizontally and can float on water. Leaves grow on petioles up to 35 cm long, and are round to kidney-shaped, with 3–7 lobes and crenate to entire margins. Flowers are small, pale greenish white to pale yellow, and come in umbels of 5–13. Fruits are small achenes that can float, helping the seeds to disperse.

The South American weevil Listronotus elongatus lays eggs on and eats the floating pennywort, and larvae also eat into the stems, reducing the pennywort's ability to grow. The weevil has been introduced for biocontrol of the floating pennywort into waterways in Britain, following extensive research to establish that the weevil is not a threat in itself.
