= Listroderes costirostris =

Scientific classification
- Domain: Eukaryota
- Kingdom: Animalia
- Phylum: Arthropoda
- Class: Insecta
- Order: Coleoptera
- Suborder: Polyphaga
- Infraorder: Cucujiformia
- Family: Curculionidae
- Genus: Listroderes
- Species: L. costirostris

Binomial name
- Listroderes costirostris Schönherr, 1826

Synonyms
- Desiantha nociva Lea, 1909; Desiantha novica French, 1908; Listroderes difficilis Germain, 1895; Listroderes hypocritus Hustache, 1926; Listroderes obliquus Klug, 1829; Listroderes vicinus Hustache, 1926

Species of beetle

Listroderes costirostris, the vegetable weevil, is a species of underwater weevil in the beetle family Curculionidae. It is found in North America.

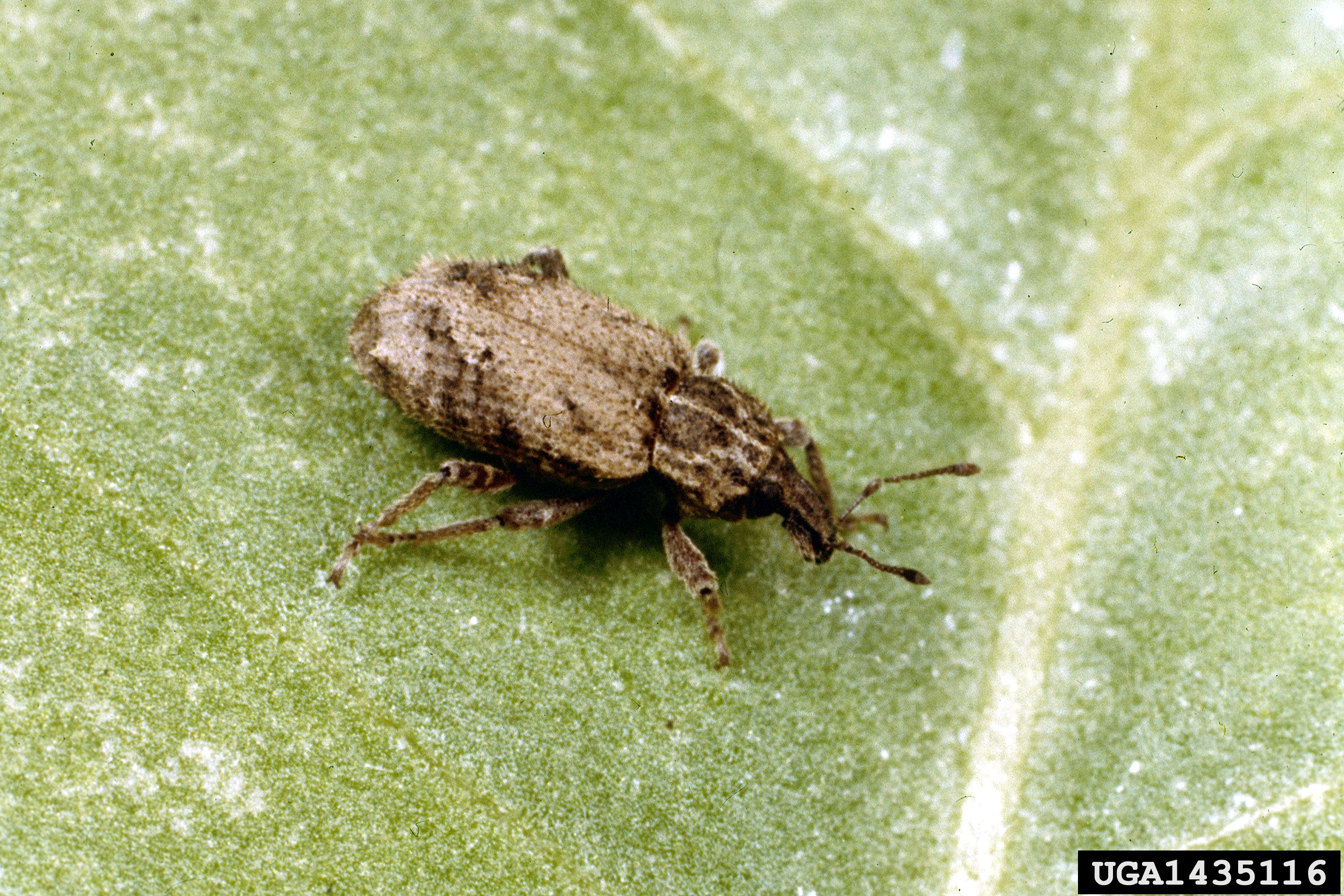
Vegetable weevil, Listroderes costirostris
