= Charles Ernest Riddiford =

Cartographer and typographer for National Geographic

Charles Ernest Riddiford was a British cartographer, who spent most of his career at the National Geographic magazine. He was noted for the elegant use of typography in his works, embraced the challenges of photocomposition and photographic reproduction, and recognised the subliminal impact of the medium on the way information is accepted.

== Life ==
Riddiford was born in UK, and after studying in Edinburgh, travelled to America in 1923. He worked at the National Geographic Society, within their Cartographic division. From 1923 to 1959, he was a Staff Cartographer.

Riddiford lived in Washington, D.C.

He retired in 1959, and died in 1968, aged 71. His obituary appeared in the Washington Post, May 15, 1968.

== Works ==
Riddiford's work was often featured in National Geographic magazine. He worked under chief cartographer Albert H. Bumstead.

In the mid-1930s, while at National Geographic Society, he was commissioned to produce a series of typefaces for maps. Digitised versions of his typefaces are in current use in the publication. The typefaces are noted for being both attractive and exceptionally legible. Although designed for photo-reproduction, the typefaces feature calligraphic traits, with line weights varying as if produced by an angled broad nib.

Riddiford contributed to the magazine The Professional Geographer in September 1952, commenting on how the aesthetic appeal of a work has a profound impact on its acceptance. This significantly pre-dates The medium is the message.

In 1954, Riddiford invented a collapsible globe, with an umbrella-like mechanism.

Riddiford's work is held in several museums and libraries.
