= Listronotus sparsus =

Scientific classification
- Domain: Eukaryota
- Kingdom: Animalia
- Phylum: Arthropoda
- Class: Insecta
- Order: Coleoptera
- Suborder: Polyphaga
- Infraorder: Cucujiformia
- Family: Curculionidae
- Genus: Listronotus
- Species: L. sparsus

Binomial name
- Listronotus sparsus (Say, 1831)

Synonyms
- Listroderes immundus Boheman, 1842; Listroderes latiusculus Boheman, 1842; Listroderes lineatulus Say, 1831; Listroderes squalidus Gyllenhal, 1834; Macrops imbellis Dietz, 1889; Macrops longulus Dietz, 1889

Listronotus sparsus is a species of underwater weevil in the beetle family Curculionidae.
