= Listronotus hornii =

Scientific classification
- Domain: Eukaryota
- Kingdom: Animalia
- Phylum: Arthropoda
- Class: Insecta
- Order: Coleoptera
- Suborder: Polyphaga
- Infraorder: Cucujiformia
- Family: Curculionidae
- Genus: Listronotus
- Species: L. hornii

Binomial name
- Listronotus hornii (Dietz, 1889)

Synonyms
- Macrops setiger Dietz, 1889

Species of beetle

Listronotus hornii is a species of underwater weevil in the beetle family Curculionidae.
