= Listronotus punctiger =

Scientific classification
- Kingdom: Animalia
- Phylum: Arthropoda
- Class: Insecta
- Order: Coleoptera
- Suborder: Polyphaga
- Infraorder: Cucujiformia
- Family: Curculionidae
- Genus: Listronotus
- Species: L. punctiger

Binomial name
- Listronotus punctiger LeConte, 1876

Synonyms
- Listronotus bagoiformis Champion, 1902; Listronotus gracilis LeConte, 1876

Species of beetle

Listronotus punctiger is a species of underwater weevil in the beetle family Curculionidae. It is found in North America.
