= Listronotus porcellus =

Scientific classification
- Domain: Eukaryota
- Kingdom: Animalia
- Phylum: Arthropoda
- Class: Insecta
- Order: Coleoptera
- Suborder: Polyphaga
- Infraorder: Cucujiformia
- Family: Curculionidae
- Genus: Listronotus
- Species: L. porcellus

Binomial name
- Listronotus porcellus (Say, 1831)

Synonyms
- Hyperodes minimus Blatchley, 1916

Species of beetle

Listronotus porcellus is a species of underwater weevil in the beetle family Curculionidae.
