= Listronotus dietzi =

Scientific classification
- Domain: Eukaryota
- Kingdom: Animalia
- Phylum: Arthropoda
- Class: Insecta
- Order: Coleoptera
- Suborder: Polyphaga
- Infraorder: Cucujiformia
- Family: Curculionidae
- Genus: Listronotus
- Species: L. dietzi

Binomial name
- Listronotus dietzi O'Brien, 1979

Species of beetle

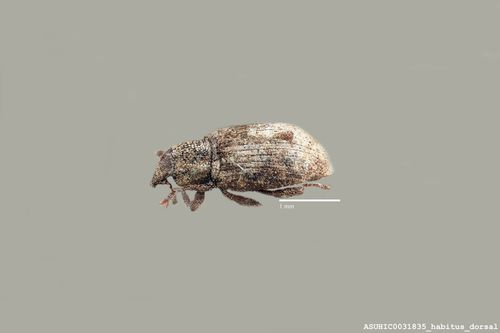
Listronotus dietzi's top view

Listronotus dietzi is a species of underwater weevil in the beetle family Curculionidae. It is found in North America, specifically in the United States within the state of Louisiana.
