= Listronotus delumbis =

Scientific classification
- Kingdom: Animalia
- Phylum: Arthropoda
- Class: Insecta
- Order: Coleoptera
- Suborder: Polyphaga
- Infraorder: Cucujiformia
- Family: Curculionidae
- Genus: Listronotus
- Species: L. delumbis

Binomial name
- Listronotus delumbis (Gyllenhal, 1834)

Synonyms
- Anchodemus schwarzi LeConte, 1876; Listroderes solutus Boheman, 1842; Listroderes spurcus Boheman, 1842; Macrops indistinctus Dietz, 1889

Species of beetle

Listronotus delumbis is a species of underwater weevil in the beetle family Curculionidae.
