= Listronotus cryptops =

Scientific classification
- Domain: Eukaryota
- Kingdom: Animalia
- Phylum: Arthropoda
- Class: Insecta
- Order: Coleoptera
- Suborder: Polyphaga
- Infraorder: Cucujiformia
- Family: Curculionidae
- Genus: Listronotus
- Species: L. cryptops

Binomial name
- Listronotus cryptops (Dietz, 1889)

Species of beetle

Listronotus cryptops is a species of underwater weevil in the beetle family Curculionidae.
