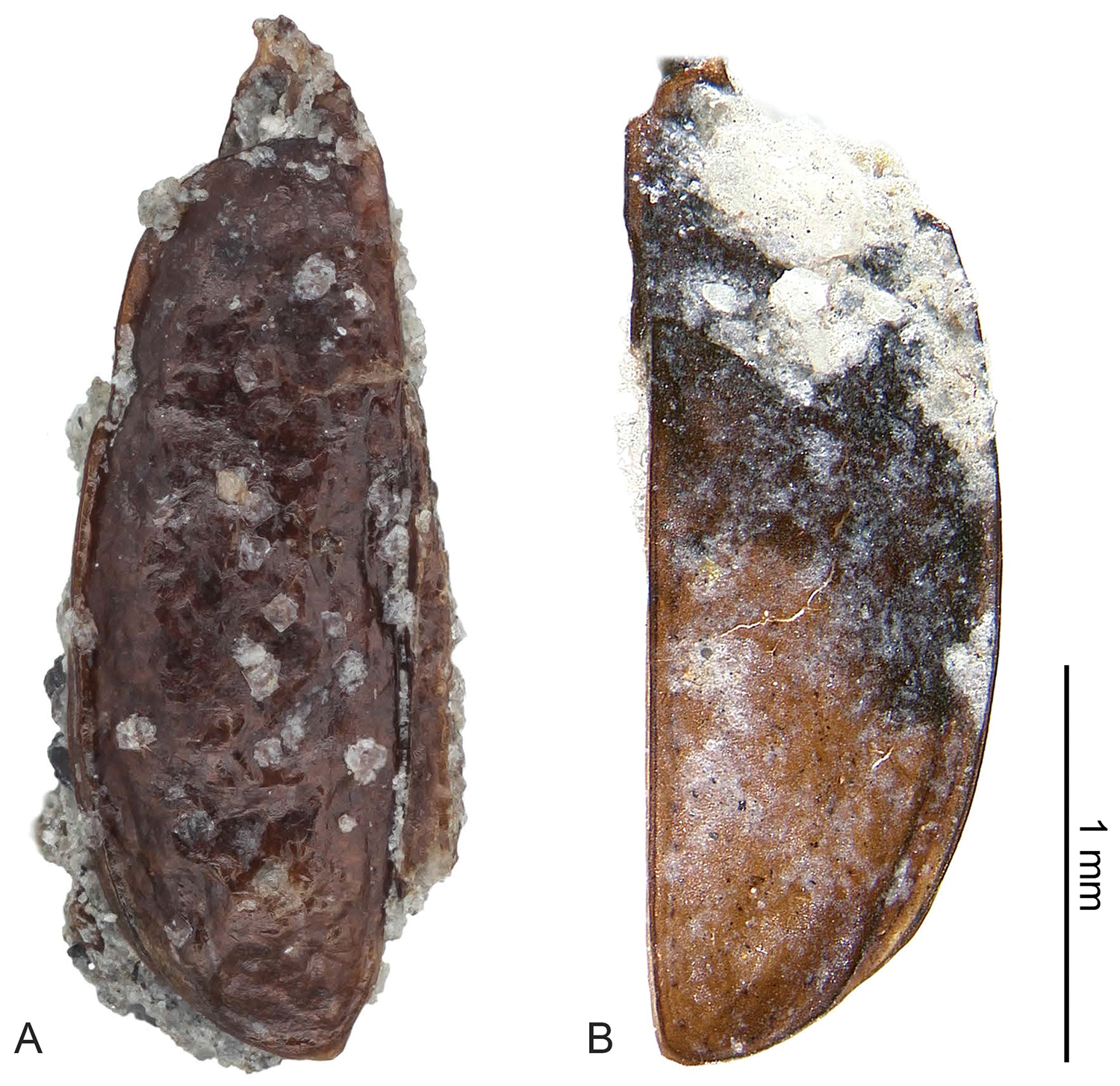
- Fossil specimens

Scientific classification
- Kingdom: Animalia
- Phylum: Arthropoda
- Class: Insecta
- Order: Coleoptera
- Suborder: Adephaga
- Family: Carabidae
- Subfamily: Trechinae
- Tribe: Trechini
- Genus: Antarctotrechus
- Species: A. balli

Binomial name
- Antarctotrechus balli Ashworth & Erwin, 2016

= Antarctotrechus =

Antarctotrechus Temporal range: Miocene，20–14 Ma

Genus of beetles

Antarctotrechus balli is extinct species of ground beetle known from the Miocene Meyer Desert Formation of Antarctica, the only species of the genus Antarctotrechus. It belongs to the tribe Trechini, and appears to be closely related to South American and Australian trechines. It was less than a centimeter long, with dark brown elytra, which are the only known parts of the animal. It is thought to have lived in a tundra environment, which included Nothofagus prostrate shrubs, Ranunculus (buttercups) and moss that grew around the banks of a stream on the outwash plain at the head of a fjord.
