= Annual bluegrass weevil =

Scientific classification
- Kingdom: Animalia
- Phylum: Arthropoda
- Clade: Pancrustacea
- Class: Insecta
- Order: Coleoptera
- Suborder: Polyphaga
- Infraorder: Cucujiformia
- Superfamily: Curculionoidea
- Family: Curculionidae
- Genus: Listronotus
- Species: L. maculicollis

Binomial name
- Listronotus maculicollis (Kirby, 1837)

Species of beetle

The annual bluegrass weevil, scientific name Listronotus maculicollis, is a turfgrass insect pest which feeds mainly on annual bluegrass (Poa annua). They prefer to feed on very low mown grass, and are thus found mostly on golf courses or grass tennis courts. ABWs, as they are often referred to, were only found in the Northeastern United States until the 2000s when sightings began to expand. In recent years they have been found as far north as Ontario and Quebec, as far west as Ohio, and as far south as North Carolina. Their choice of hosts has also expanded, and they have been reported feeding on perennial ryegrass (lolium perenne) and creeping bentgrass (Agrostis stolonifera).

== The spread of the ABW ==
Annual bluegrass weevils were first discovered in Connecticut in 1931. They spread slowly at first, contained mostly to New York, New Jersey, and much of New England until after the 1970s, when they were seen in Pennsylvania. It was not until the 2000s, however, that they began to rapidly spread throughout the Mid-Atlantic and into the Midwest.

== Life cycle ==
- Egg
  - Laid by adult females in the leaf sheath
- Larvae
  - Five instar stages
  - Feed on inside of stem in early stage
  - When too large for stem, larvae leave into the soil and begin to feed on crown of turf
  - Fifth instar larvae are believed to be the most damaging stage
- Pupae
- Adult
  - Feed on blades of turf but damage is negligible

== Damage and diagnostic features ==
Damage to turfgrass appears as yellowing or browning of patches of turf that will grow larger if untreated. As this symptom can be indicative of a number of issues, there are a few diagnostic features commonly used to identify ABWs as the problem. Stems of the plants will be hollowed out and have a sawdust-like frass left in them, which is a result of the younger larvae feeding on them. Additionally, notches on blades of the turf observed are a sign of adult ABWs feeding.

== Management ==
Biological management of annual bluegrass weevils has only been proven moderately effective in the lab environment. Research of parasitic nematodes has shown to be promising, while parasitic wasp research has been unsuccessful.

Cultural management of annual bluegrass weevil can be achieved by limiting the populations of susceptible hosts, providing adequate moisture and fertility, and removing leaf litter from turf areas in the fall as this is where the adult ABWs overwinter.

Chemical management of annual bluegrass weevil is the most effective way to reduce the pest population. Preventive applications of insecticides, especially pyrethroids, should be timed with the local Forsythia bloom (half green/half gold)in order to cut the population before the first generation of eggs are laid for the year.
