= Polar Subglacial Basin =

Geological feature in Antarctica

Polar Subglacial Basin (85°0′S 110°0′E) is a subglacial basin situated generally between Gamburtsev Subglacial Mountains and the Dominion Range in East Antarctica. The feature was roughly delineated by American, United Kingdom and Soviet seismic field parties, 1958–61. Named by Advisory Committee on Antarctic Names (US-ACAN) (1961) for the proximity of the feature to the South Pole area.
