= Listroderes apicalis =

Scientific classification
- Domain: Eukaryota
- Kingdom: Animalia
- Phylum: Arthropoda
- Class: Insecta
- Order: Coleoptera
- Suborder: Polyphaga
- Infraorder: Cucujiformia
- Family: Curculionidae
- Genus: Listroderes
- Species: L. apicalis

Binomial name
- Listroderes apicalis Waterhouse, 1841

Synonyms
- Listroderes argentinensis Hustache, 1926

Species of beetle

Listroderes apicalis is a species of underwater weevil in the beetle family Curculionidae. It is found in North America.
