= Grosvenor Mountains =

Mountain group in the Ross Dependency, Antarctica

- Location within Antarctica

Geography
- Continent: Antarctica
- Area: Marie Byrd Land
- Range coordinates: 85°40′S 175°0′E
- Parent range: Queen Maud Mountains

The Grosvenor Mountains (85°40′S 175°0′E) are a group of widely scattered mountains and nunataks rising above the Antarctic polar plateau east of the head of Mill Glacier, extending from Mount Pratt in the north to the Mount Raymond area in the south, and from Otway Massif in the northwest to Larkman Nunatak in the southeast.

== Discovery and naming ==
The Grosvenor Mountains were discovered by Rear Admiral Richard E. Byrd on the Byrd Antarctic Expedition flight to the South Pole in November 1929, and named by him for Gilbert Hovey Grosvenor, President of the National Geographic Society, which helped finance the expedition. Several peaks near Mount Raymond were apparently observed by Ernest Shackleton in 1908, although they were then considered to be a continuation of the Dominion Range.

== Location ==
The Grosvenor Mountains extend south and east from the Otway Massif, which forms the southeast angle of the juncture of the Mill Stream Glacier and the Mill Glacier. Features of the Otway Massif, which is split by the Burgess Glacier, include Mount Spohn, Mount Petlock, Mom Peak and Johnston Heights. To the southeast are Mount Bumstead, Aitken Nunatak, Mount Emily, Mount Cecily and Mount Raymond. Further east are Mount Pratt, Block Peak, Mauger Nunatak, Mount Block, Hayman Nunataks and Larkman Nunatak.

== Otway Massif ==
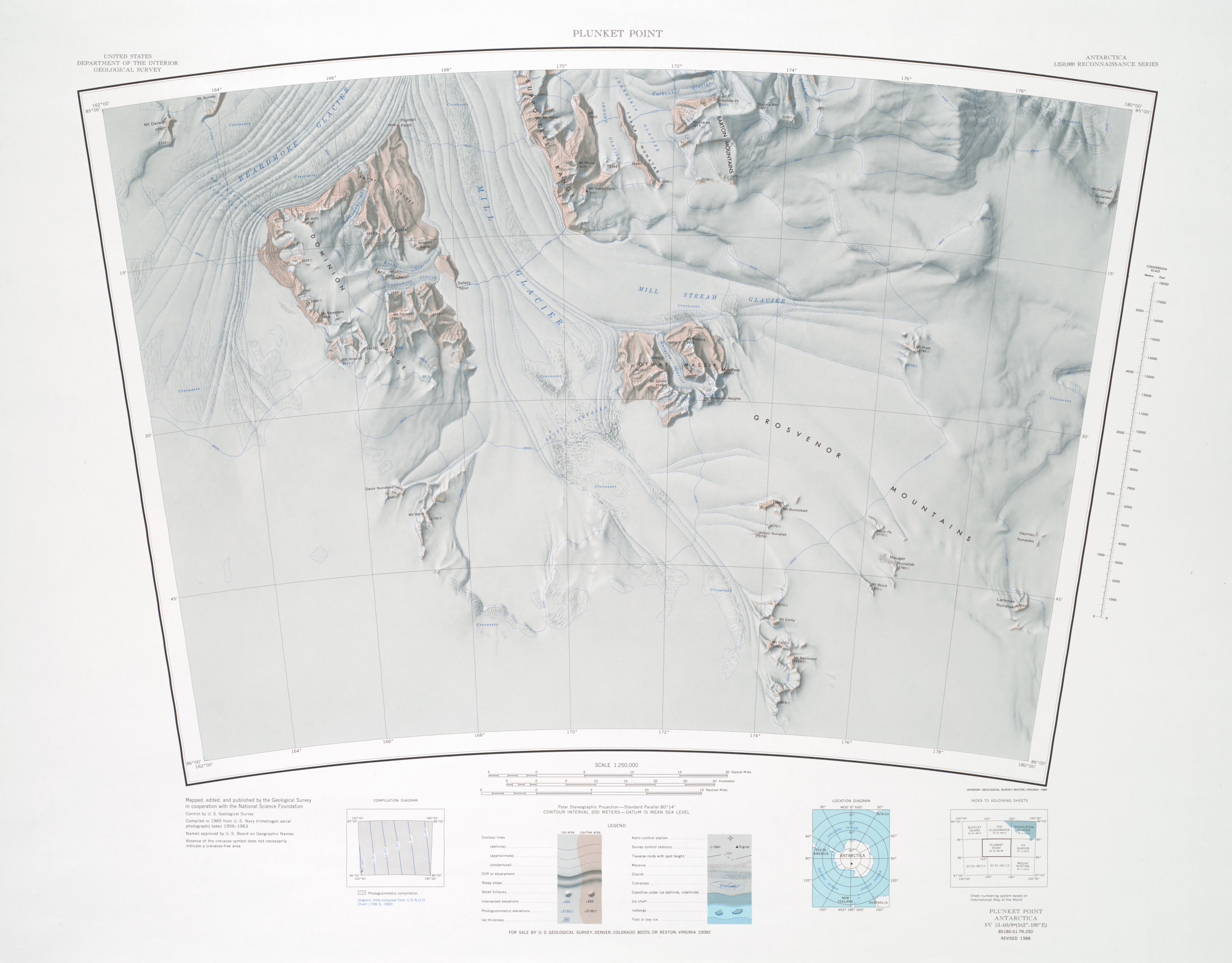
Grosvenor Mountains in southeast

85°27′S 172°00′E. A prominent, mainly ice-free massif, about 10 nautical miles (19 km; 12 mi) long and 7 nautical miles (13 km; 8.1 mi) wide, standing at the northwest end of the Grosvenor Mountains at the confluence of Mill Glacier and Mill Stream Glacier. Surveyed and named by the Southern Party of the New Zealand Geological Survey Antarctic Expedition (NZGSAE) (1961-62) for P.M. Otway, who had wintered over at Scott Base and was a member of this party and the Northern Party during the summer of 1960-61.

Features of the Otway Massif include:

=== Mount Spohn ===
85°28′S 171°59′E. A prominent peak rising from Otway Massif, being the highest summit, 3,240 metres (10,630 ft) high, on the ridge bordering the west side of Burgess Glacier. Named by the United States Advisory Committee on Antarctic Names (US-ACAN) for Harry R. Spohn, United States Antarctic Research Program (USARP) meteorologist at South Pole Station, 1963.

=== Mount Petlock ===
85°25′S 172°16′E. The most prominent mountain, 3,195 metres (10,482 ft) high, in the northeast part of Otway Massif, surmounting the north end of the ridge which borders the east side of Burgess Glacier. Named by US-ACAN for James D. Petlock, USARP ionospheric physicist at South Pole Station, 1963.

=== Mom Peak ===
85°27′S 173°00′E. A peak, 3,260 metres (10,700 ft) high, in eastern Otway Massif, 5 nautical miles (9.3 km; 5.8 mi) southeast of Mount Petlock. Mapped by USGS from surveys and United States Navy air photos (1959-63). This name recognizes the activities of Shirley (Mrs. James C.) Anderson of San Diego, CA, widely known as "Antarctica Mom" among United States personnel wintering over in Antarctica. In the years following 1961, Mrs. Anderson communicated with thousands of wintering personnel in Antarctica and her efforts contributed greatly to their morale.

=== Johnston Heights ===
85°29′S 172°47′E. Snow-covered heights, 3,220 metres (10,560 ft) high, forming the southeast corner of Otway Massif. Mapped by the USGS from surveys and United States Navy aerial photographs, 1959-63. Named by US-ACAN for David P. Johnston, member of a USARP geological party to the area, 1967-68 season.

== Other features ==
=== Mount Bumstead ===
85°39′S 174°10′E. A large, isolated mountain, 2,990 metres (9,810 ft) high, standing 10 nautical miles (19 km; 12 mi) southeast of Otway Massif. Discovered by Rear Admiral Byrd on the ByrdAE flight to the South Pole in November 1929. Named by him for Albert H. Bumstead, chief cartographer of the National Geographic Society at that time, and inventor of the sun compass, a device utilizing shadows of the sun to determine directions in areas where magnetic compasses are unreliable.

=== Aitken Nunatak ===
85°42′S 173°49′E. A small rock nunatak, 2,785 metres (9,137 ft) high, standing 3 nautical miles (5.6 km; 3.5 mi) southwest of Mount Bumstead. Named by US-ACAN for William M. Aitken, USARP aurora scientist at South Pole Station, 1962.

=== Mount Emily ===
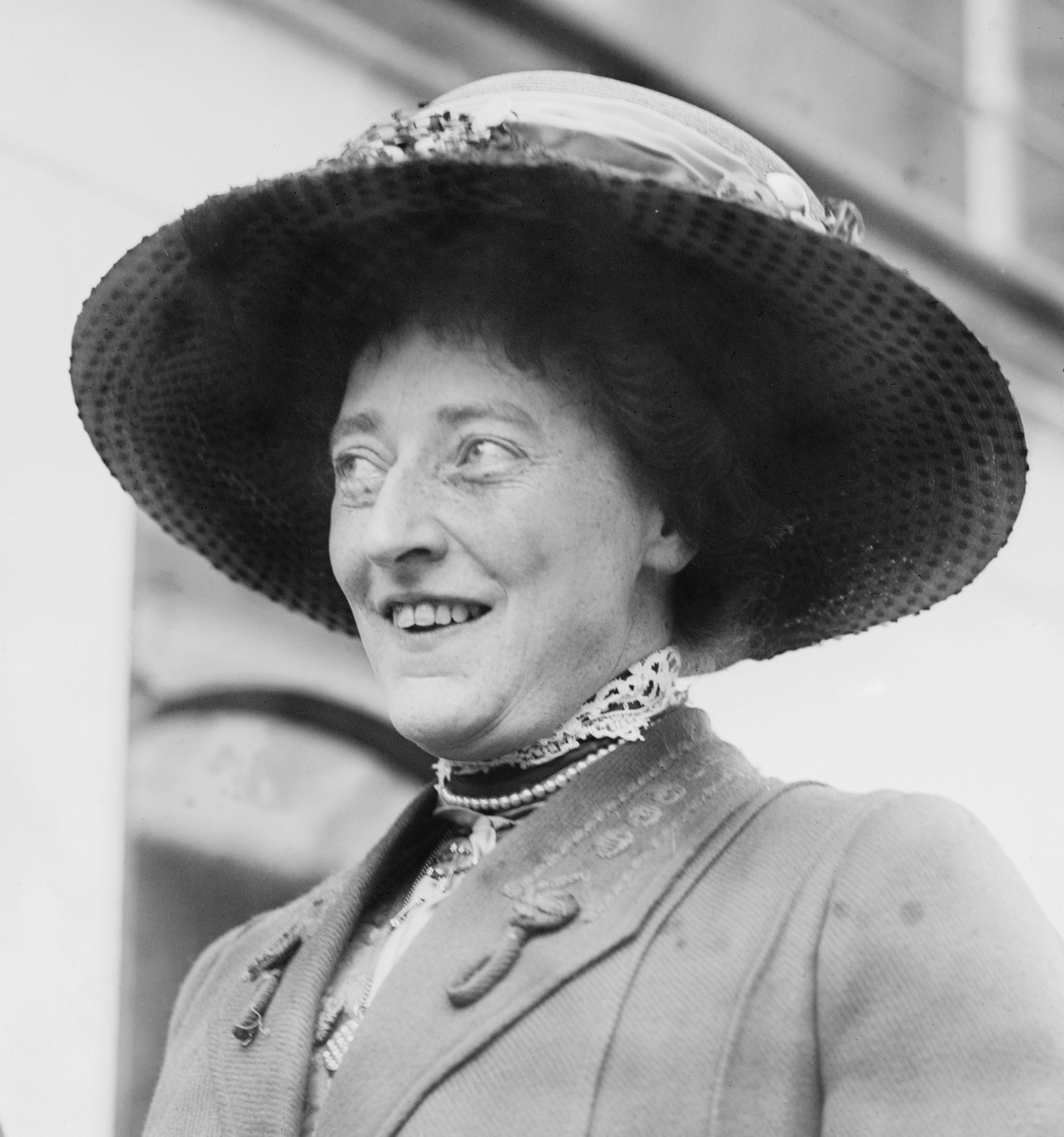
Lady Emily Dorman Shackleton

85°50′S 174°20′E. A rock peak 2 nautical miles (3.7 km; 2.3 mi) north of Mount Cecily. Shown by the BrAE (1907-09) as being part of the Dominion Range, but it is separated from that range by the flow of the Mill Glacier. Named by Shackleton for his wife, Lady Emily Dorman Shackleton.

=== Mount Cecily ===
85°52′S 174°15′E. Prominent peak, 2,870 metres (9,420 ft) high, standing 2.5 nautical miles (4.6 km; 2.9 mi) northwest of Mount Raymond. Discovered by the BrAE (1907-09) and named for Shackleton's daughter. The position agrees with that shown on Shackleton's map but the peak does not lie in the Dominion Range as he thought, being separated from that range by the Mill Glacier.

=== Mount Raymond ===
85°53′S 174°43′E. A rock peak, 2,820 metres (9,250 ft) high, standing on the southernmost ridge of the Grosvenor Mountains, 2.5 nautical miles (4.6 km; 2.9 mi) southeast of Mount Cecily. Discovered by Shackleton of the BrAE (1907-09), who named this feature for his eldest son. The position agrees with that shown on Shackleton's map, but the peak does not lie in the Dominion Range as he thought, being separated from that range by Mill Glacier.

=== Mount Pratt ===
85°24′S 176°41′E. The northernmost nunatak in the Grosvenor Mountains, standing just east of the head of Mill Stream Glacier, 17 nautical miles (31 km; 20 mi) north of Block Peak. Discovered by R. Admiral Byrd on the ByrdAE flight to the South Pole in November 1929, and named by him for Thomas B. Pratt, American financier and contributor to the expedition. Not: Stenhouse Nunatak.

=== Block Peak ===
85°41′S 176°13′E. A peak, 2,770 metres (9,090 ft) high, standing 4 nautical miles (7.4 km; 4.6 mi) northwest of Mauger Nunatak. Discovered by R. Admiral Byrd on the ByrdAE flight to the South Pole in November 1929. Named by him for William Block, son of Paul Block who was a patron of the expedition.

=== Mauger Nunatak ===
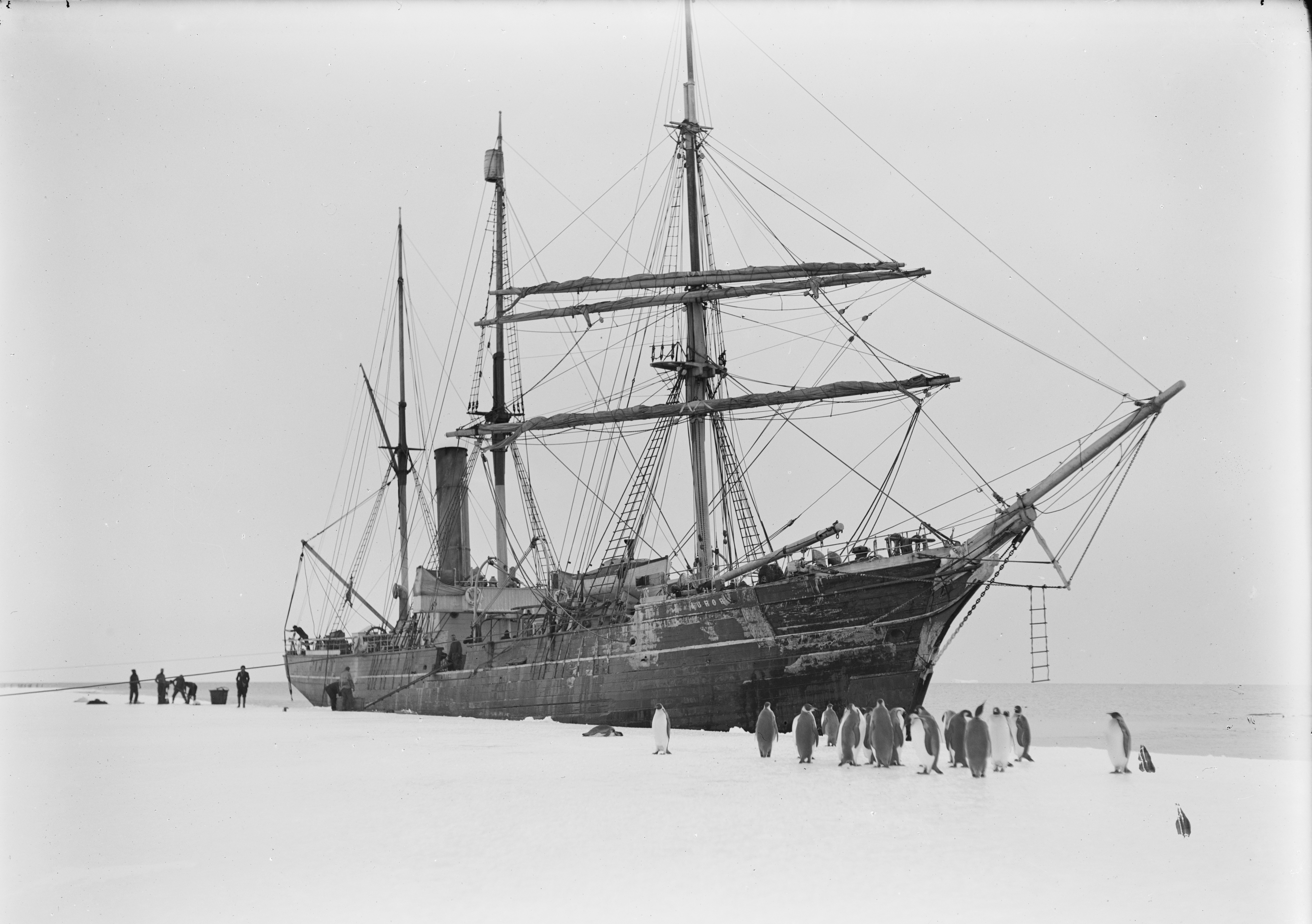
Aurora c. 1912

85°44′S 176°44′E. A nunatak, 2,780 metres (9,120 ft) high, about 3 nautical miles (5.6 km; 3.5 mi) northeast of Mount Block. Named by the NZGSAE (1961-62) for C.C. Mauger, crew member of the Aurora, the vessel which transported the Ross Sea Party of Shackleton's Imperial TransAntarctic Expedition (1914-17) from Australia to the Ross Sea.

=== Mount Block ===
85°46′S 176°13′E. A nunatak standing 5 nautical miles (9.3 km; 5.8 mi) south of Block Peak. Discovered by R. Admiral Byrd on the ByrdAE flight to the South Pole in November 1929. Named by him for Paul Block, Jr., son of Paul Block, a patron of the expedition.

=== Hayman Nunataks ===
85°40′S 179°30′E. A small group of isolated nunataks at the east end of the Grosvenor Mountains, 6 nautical miles (11 km; 6.9 mi) north of Larkman Nunatak. Named by US-ACAN for Noel R. Hayman, USARP aurora scientist at Hallett Station, 1962.

=== Larkman Nunatak ===
85°46′S 179°23′E. A large, isolated rock nunatak, 2,660 metres (8,730 ft) high, at the southeast end of the Grosvenor Mountains, 12 nautical miles (22 km; 14 mi) east of Mauger Nunatak. Named by the NZGSAE (1961-62) for A.H. Larkman, Chief Engineer of the Aurora, the vessel which transported the Ross Sea Party of Shackleton's Imperial Trans-Antarctic Expedition (1914-17) from Australia to the Ross Sea.

== Sources ==
- Alberts, Fred G., ed. (1995), Geographic Names of the Antarctic (PDF) (2 ed.), United States Board on Geographic Names This article incorporates public domain material from websites or documents of the United States Board on Geographic Names.
- Plunket Point, USGS: United States Geological Survey
- This article incorporates public domain material from websites or documents of the United States Geological Survey.
