= Listronotus humilis =

Scientific classification
- Kingdom: Animalia
- Phylum: Arthropoda
- Class: Insecta
- Order: Coleoptera
- Suborder: Polyphaga
- Infraorder: Cucujiformia
- Family: Curculionidae
- Genus: Listronotus
- Species: L. humilis

Binomial name
- Listronotus humilis (Gyllenhal, 1834)

Synonyms
- Macrops subcribratus Dietz, 1889

Species of beetle

Listronotus humilis is a species of underwater weevil in the beetle family Curculionidae. It is found in North America.
