= Listronotus rotundicollis =

Scientific classification
- Kingdom: Animalia
- Phylum: Arthropoda
- Class: Insecta
- Order: Coleoptera
- Suborder: Polyphaga
- Infraorder: Cucujiformia
- Family: Curculionidae
- Genus: Listronotus
- Species: L. rotundicollis

Binomial name
- Listronotus rotundicollis LeConte, 1876

Synonyms
- Listronotus cribricollis LeConte, 1876

Species of beetle

Listronotus rotundicollis is a species of underwater weevil in the beetle family Curculionidae. It is found in North America.
