= Listronotus anthracinus =

Scientific classification
- Domain: Eukaryota
- Kingdom: Animalia
- Phylum: Arthropoda
- Class: Insecta
- Order: Coleoptera
- Suborder: Polyphaga
- Infraorder: Cucujiformia
- Family: Curculionidae
- Genus: Listronotus
- Species: L. anthracinus

Binomial name
- Listronotus anthracinus (Dietz, 1889)

Species of beetle

Listronotus anthracinus is a species of underwater weevil in the beetle family Curculionidae.
