= Listronotus lodingi =

Scientific classification
- Domain: Eukaryota
- Kingdom: Animalia
- Phylum: Arthropoda
- Class: Insecta
- Order: Coleoptera
- Suborder: Polyphaga
- Infraorder: Cucujiformia
- Family: Curculionidae
- Genus: Listronotus
- Species: L. lodingi

Binomial name
- Listronotus lodingi (Blatchley, 1920)

Species of beetle

Listronotus lodingi is a species of underwater weevil in the beetle family Curculionidae.
