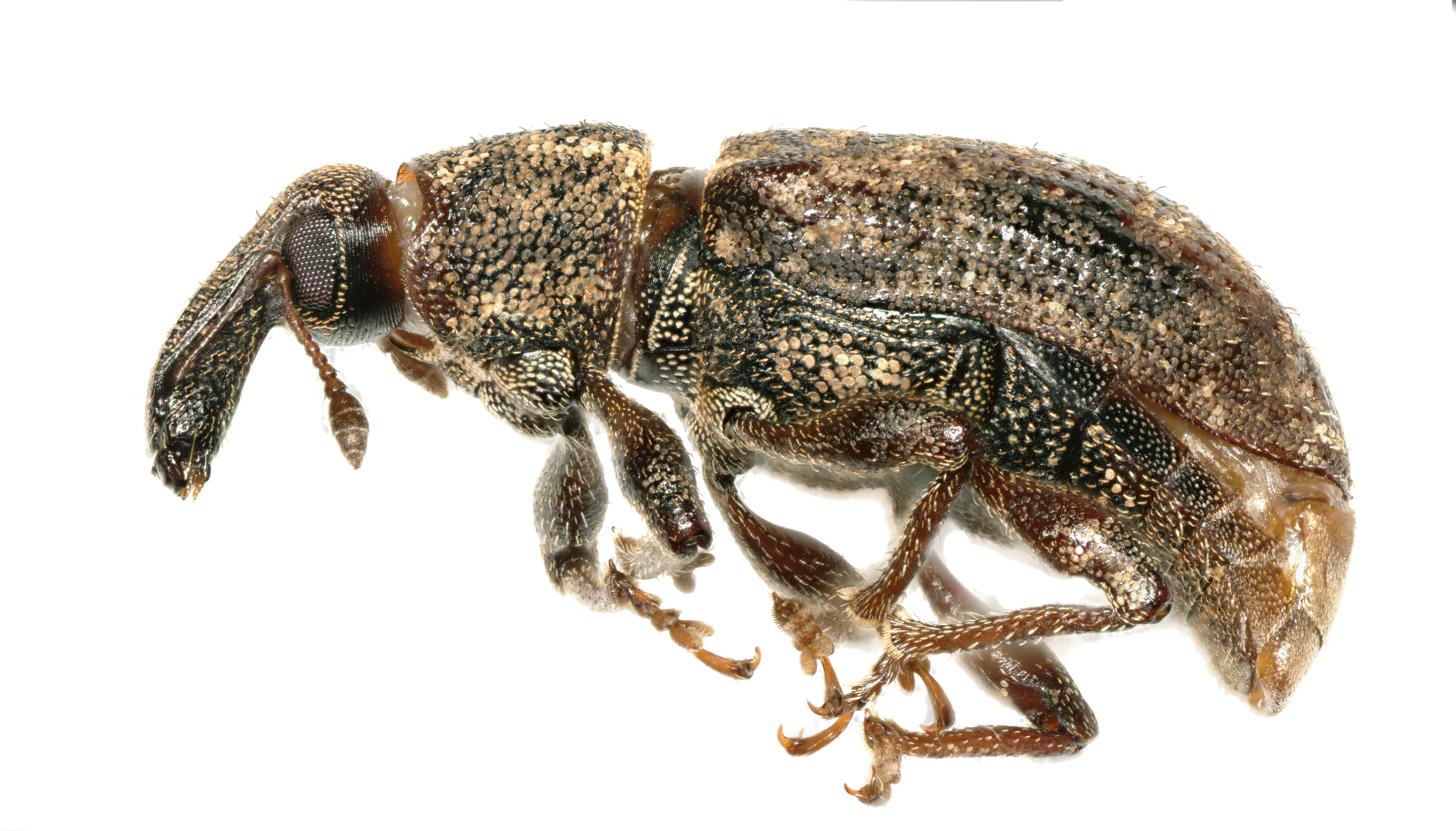

Scientific classification
- Kingdom: Animalia
- Phylum: Arthropoda
- Class: Insecta
- Order: Coleoptera
- Suborder: Polyphaga
- Infraorder: Cucujiformia
- Family: Curculionidae
- Genus: Listronotus
- Species: L. oregonensis

Binomial name
- Listronotus oregonensis (LeConte, 1857)

Synonyms
- Listronotus impressifrons LeConte, 1876; Listronotus rudipennis Blatchley, 1916; Listronotus tessellatus Casey, 1895; Listronotus latiusculus Boheman, 1842

= Listronotus oregonensis =

Species of beetle

Listronotus oregonensis, the carrot weevil, is a species of weevil in the beetle family Curculionidae. It is found in North America.

These two subspecies belong to the species Listronotus oregonensis:

- Listronotus oregonensis oregonensis (LeConte, 1857)
- Listronotus oregonensis tessellatus Casey, 1895

== Pest status ==
This species was first recognized as a pest in 1902 on parsley in Virginia. It mainly attacks cultivated Apiaceae species such as parsley, carrot, celery and dill. By feeding on the root, larvae of the carrot weevil cause direct damage to the vegetable, causing yield losses of up to 50%.

== Life cycle ==
Carrot weevil adults spend the winter in a quiescent state, hiding in the top five centimeters of soil and in weed, grass and debris left in the field, or in field borders. In spring, the female lays her eggs in a cavity that she digs at the base of the petiole of the carrot leaf. The larva passes through four larval stages that will form tunnels through the carrot to feed. The last larval stage leaves the host plant to form the pupa in the soil, from which an adult will emerge a few days later. The carrot weevil performs between one and three generations per year depending on the latitude. However, under unfavorable conditions, this species will undergo a reproductive diapause that delays egg-laying behavior until the following spring.

== Pest management ==
Because this pest has a very low migration capacity, moving mainly by walking, control is made mainly through crop rotation. Insecticide applications that target the adult stage may be necessary when the population density is high. The monitoring of the overwintering generation of adults using carrot-baited traps is an effective means of assessing the level of infestation and predicting the need for insecticide treatments.

Several natural enemies such as micro-organisms, nematodes, predatory insects and parasitoids can attack the carrot weevil. The eggs of the weevil are mainly attacked by parasitoids that are naturally present in the environment, especially by the species Anaphes victus and A. listronoti. Smaller species of ground beetles, such as Bembidion quadrimaculatum and Clivina fossor, can also attack weevil eggs. In addition, pupae that are found under the ground and adults that move on the litter are mainly attacked by larger ground beetles The nematode Bradynema listronotii has the ability to inhibit the reproductive system of the female, reducing the oviposition on host plants.
