= Mill Glacier =

Glacier in Antarctica

- Location within Antarctica
- Coordinates: 85°10′S 168°30′E
- Terminus: Beardmore Glacier

Mill Glacier (85°10′S 168°30′E) is a tributary glacier, 10 nautical miles (19 km) wide, flowing northwest between the Dominion Range and the Supporters Range into Beardmore Glacier, Antarctica. It was discovered by the British Antarctic Expedition, 1907–09, and named for Hugh Robert Mill, a British geographer and Antarctic historian.

== Course ==
The Grosvenor Mountains, a group of widely scattered mountains and nunataks, rises above the polar plateau east of the head of Mill Glacier. The Mill Glacier is a valley glacier that flows down from the Grosvenor Mountains past Otway Massif, then between the Dominion Range and Supporters Range before joining the Beardmore Glacier. The head of the glacier is crossed by the Scott Icefalls. From there it flows northwest between the Dominion Range to the west and the Otway Massif to the east. The Mill Stream Glacier, which is fed from the south by the Burgess Glacier, joins the Mill Glacier from the east to the north of the Otway Massif. The Vandement Glacier and the Koski Glacier enter from the Dominion Range to the west. The Mill Glacier flows past the Supporters Range to the east to join the Beardmore Glacier from the southeast at Plunket Point.

== Airfield potential ==
Over large areas the Mill Glacier has very smooth ice, free of crevasses. Just upstream of Plunket Point, where it joins the Beardmore, there is an area of smooth and level blue ice over 7 kilometres (4.3 mi) long in a NNW-SSE direction that is suitable for an airfield. The ice thickness seems to be about 650 metres (2,130 ft). The runway faces directly into the wind. It appears to be a useful alternative to Mount Howe in an emergency. During the Shackleton Glacier Project, 1995-1996, Lockheed LC-130 aircraft placed fuel caches on the Mill Glacier.

== Tributaries ==
Southern head of the glacier (northwest corner of map)

=== Scott Icefalls ===
85°32′S 170°15′E. Extensive icefalls near the head of Mill Glacier, between Otway Massif and the south part of Dominion Range. Named by the NZGSAE (1961-62) for Captain Robert Falcon Scott.

=== Mill Stream Glacier ===
85°20′S 171°00′E. A tributary glacier, about 10 nautical miles (19 km; 12 mi) wide, flowing west between Supporters Range and Otway Massif to enter Mill Glacier. Named by the NZGSAE (1961-62) in association with Mill Glacier.

=== Burgess Glacier ===
85°26′S 171°55′E. A glacier, 7 nautical miles (13 km; 8.1 mi) long, flowing northwest through Otway Massif to enter Mill Stream Glacier. Named by the Advisory Committee on Antarctic Names (US-ACAN) for Robert W. Burgess, United States Antarctic Program (USARP) ionospheric physicist at South Pole Station in 1963.

=== Vandement Glacier ===
85°19′S 167°10′E. An east-flowing glacier, 6 nautical miles (11 km; 6.9 mi) long, draining the east-central portion of the Dominion Range icecap. The glacier lies close south of Koski Glacier, whose flow it parallels, and terminates 2 nautical miles (3.7 km; 2.3 mi) northwest of Safety Spur. Named by US-ACAN for Charles H. Vandament, USARP ionospheric physicist at South Pole Station in 1962.

=== Koski Glacier ===
85°17′S 167°15′E. An east-flowing glacier, 7 nautical miles (13 km; 8.1 mi) long, draining the east-central portion of the Dominion Range icecap. The glacier lies close north of Vandament Glacier, whose flow it parallels, and terminates at Mill Glacier just southeast of Browns Butte. Named by US-ACAN for Raymond J. Koski, USARP engineer on several traverses originating at the South Pole Station 1962-63, 1963–64 and 1964–65.

== Sources ==
- Alberts, Fred G., ed. (1995), Geographic Names of the Antarctic (PDF) (2 ed.), United States Board on Geographic Names This article incorporates public domain material from websites or documents of the United States Board on Geographic Names.
- Elliot, David H. (1996), Shackleton Glacier Project, 1995-1996, Byrd Polar Research Center and Department of Geological Sciences, Ohio State University, Columbus, Ohio
- Mellor, Malcolm (1989), Airfields on Antarctic Glacier Ice, Cold Regions Research & Engineering Laboratory
- Plunket Point (PDF), USGS: United States Geological Survey
- This article incorporates public domain material from websites or documents of the United States Geological Survey.
