= Horace Bumstead =

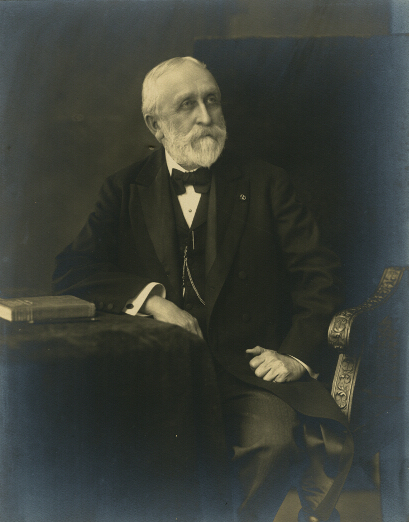
- Bumstead in 1907
- Born: September 29, 1841; Boston, Massachusetts, US
- Died: October 14, 1919 (aged 78); Intervale, New Hampshire, US
- Education: Yale University; New York University
- Occupations: Professor, college president

Horace Bumstead (September 29, 1841 – October 14, 1919) was a Congregationalist minister and educator. He used his career to fight for African American education and became the second president of Atlanta University (1888–1907). Bumstead was one of the first white men in the United States to fight for educational rights for African Americans. As a white man, he was condemned by many for taking on this role, but African Americans rallied behind his efforts and viewed him as a spokesman.

== Education ==
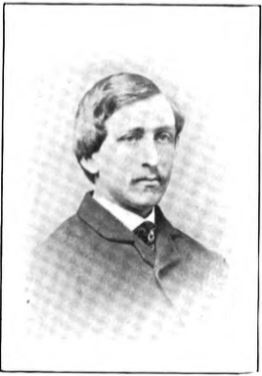
Horace Bumstead

Horace Bumstead was born in Boston on September 29, 1841, the son of Josiah Freeman Bumstead, a Boston merchant, and Lucy Douglas Willis Bumstead. He was an achieving scholar throughout his life. He began his studies at Boston Latin School, where he won the Benjamin Franklin silver medal, an award given to extraordinarily curious, innovative, and motivated individuals at the start of their careers, who deserve greater recognition, encouragement, and mentoring. He later attended Yale University, where he won the Phi Beta Kappa appointment, and later graduated in 1863 from the university. He graduated at the age of twenty-two, in the studies of military science. Once the civil war was over, he studied at Andover Theological Seminary in 1870. His studies later led him to Germany for a year, where he would become a pastor in Minneapolis until 1875. His final educational achievement was his Doctor of Divinity Degree from New York University in 1881.

== Military ==
After graduating from Yale in 1863, the Civil War began in America. His military science degree led him to the immediate commission as a major of the 43rd United States Colored Infantry from April 1864 to December 1865, with whom he served at Richmond, Petersburg, and Brownsville. The 43rd Regiment of the U.S. Colored Infantry troops was discharged at Philadelphia on November 30, 1865.

== Career ==
In 1875, Bumstead became part of the faculty of Atlanta University, joining his Yale classmate and the first president of the university, Edmund Asa Ware. Bumstead started his work at the school as a professor of natural science. After the sudden death of Ware in 1885, Bumstead was one of a number of professors who served as interim presidents until 1888, when Bumstead was named to as the university's second president. After being granted this position, Bumstead began his fight for equal rights for African American education.

He died in Intervale, New Hampshire on October 14, 1919.
