= Albert H. Bumstead =

American cartographer and inventor

Albert Hoit Bumstead
- Born: 1875; Minneapolis, Minnesota, U.S.
- Died: January 9, 1940 (aged 64–65)
- Education: Worcester Academy; Worcester Polytechnic Institute
- Occupations: Cartographer, inventor, engineer
- Employer(s): United States Geological Survey; Yale University; National Geographic Society
- Known for: Bumstead sun compass
- Parent: Horace Bumstead (father)

Albert Hoit Bumstead (1875–January 9, 1940) was an American cartographer and inventor.

Bumstead was born in Minneapolis in 1875 to American educator Horace Bumstead as the first of his three sons, the same year his father joined the faculty of Atlanta University in Atlanta, Georgia, and would serve as its longtime second president. Albert attended Worcester Academy in Worcester, Massachusetts for one year, graduating in 1894, then went on to Worcester Polytechnic Institute (WPI) and studied civil engineering. After WPI, he was a surveyor for the United States Geological Survey. In 1910 he resided in Townsend Harbor, Massachusetts.

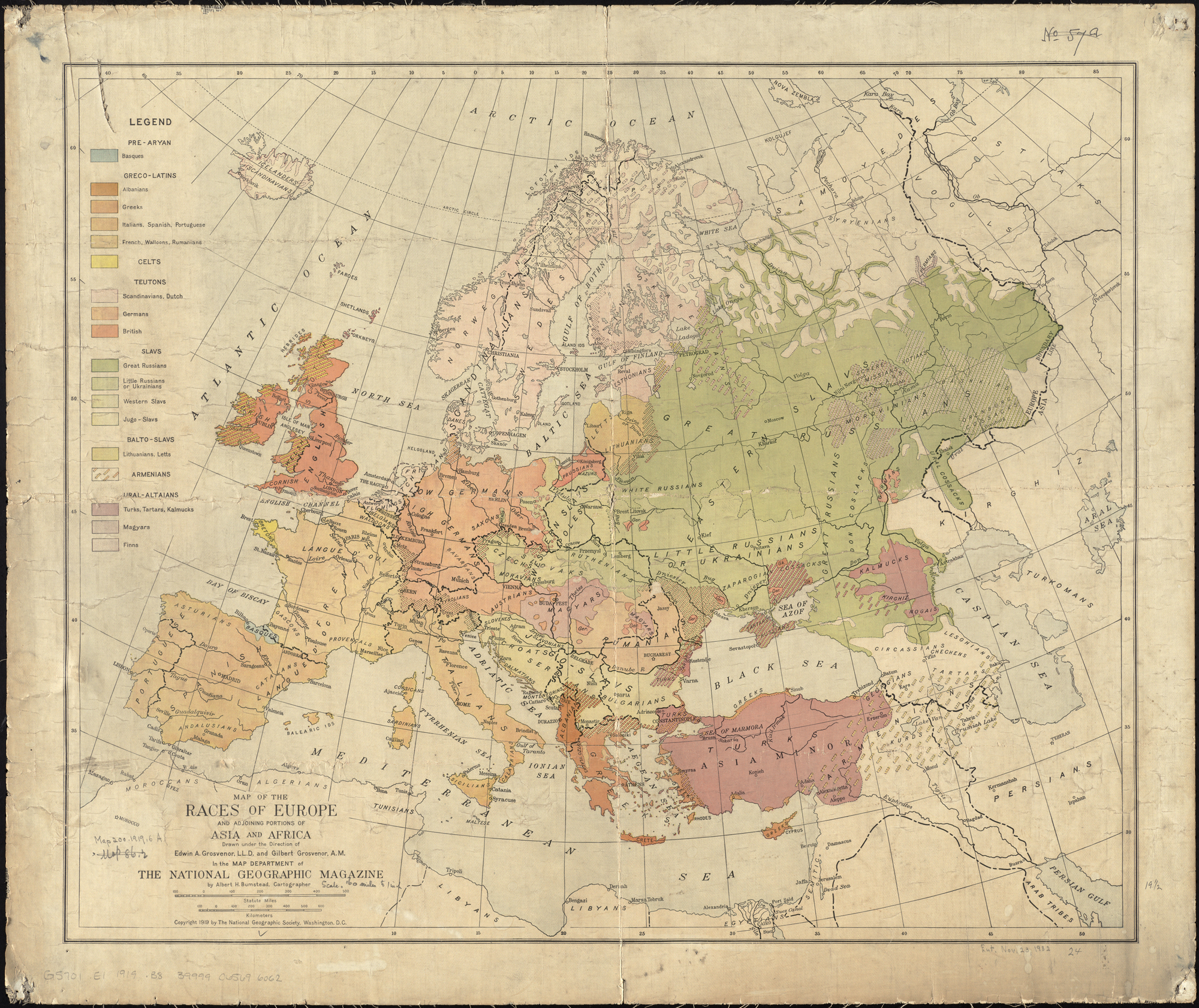
"Map of the races of Europe and adjoining portions of Asia and Africa", drawn by Bustead for the National Geographic Society, 1919

In 1912, he became the topographer of the Yale University expedition to Peru under explorer Hiram Bingham III, and by 1916 he was a cartographer at the National Geographic Society, where he would remain for 25 years.

To solve a navigational challenge faced by Admiral Richard E. Byrd and his first 1925 flights into North Greenland, because magnetic readings become less reliable in polar regions, Bumstead invented the Bumstead sun compass, which uses sun-cast shadows to determine direction. Bumstead also made compasses for the Navy aviators in the Arctic expedition led by Donald Baxter MacMillan, and for Roald Amundsen for his trans-polar flight of the dirigible Norge in 1926.

In addition, Bumstead devised a method for making marble bas-reliefs from photographs using a dual vision device, a prime with two reflecting surfaces. In 1916 Bumstead and his younger brother Ralph W. Bumstead (1881-1964) were granted a patent for a device which would encode and decode telegraphic transmissions.

Albert died on January 9, 1940. Mount Bumstead in the Grosvenor Mountains in the Antarctic was named by Admiral Byrd in his honor.

Posthumously, a patent for a "photographic apparatus" to be used for phototypography was submitted in 1941 and issue late 1943.
