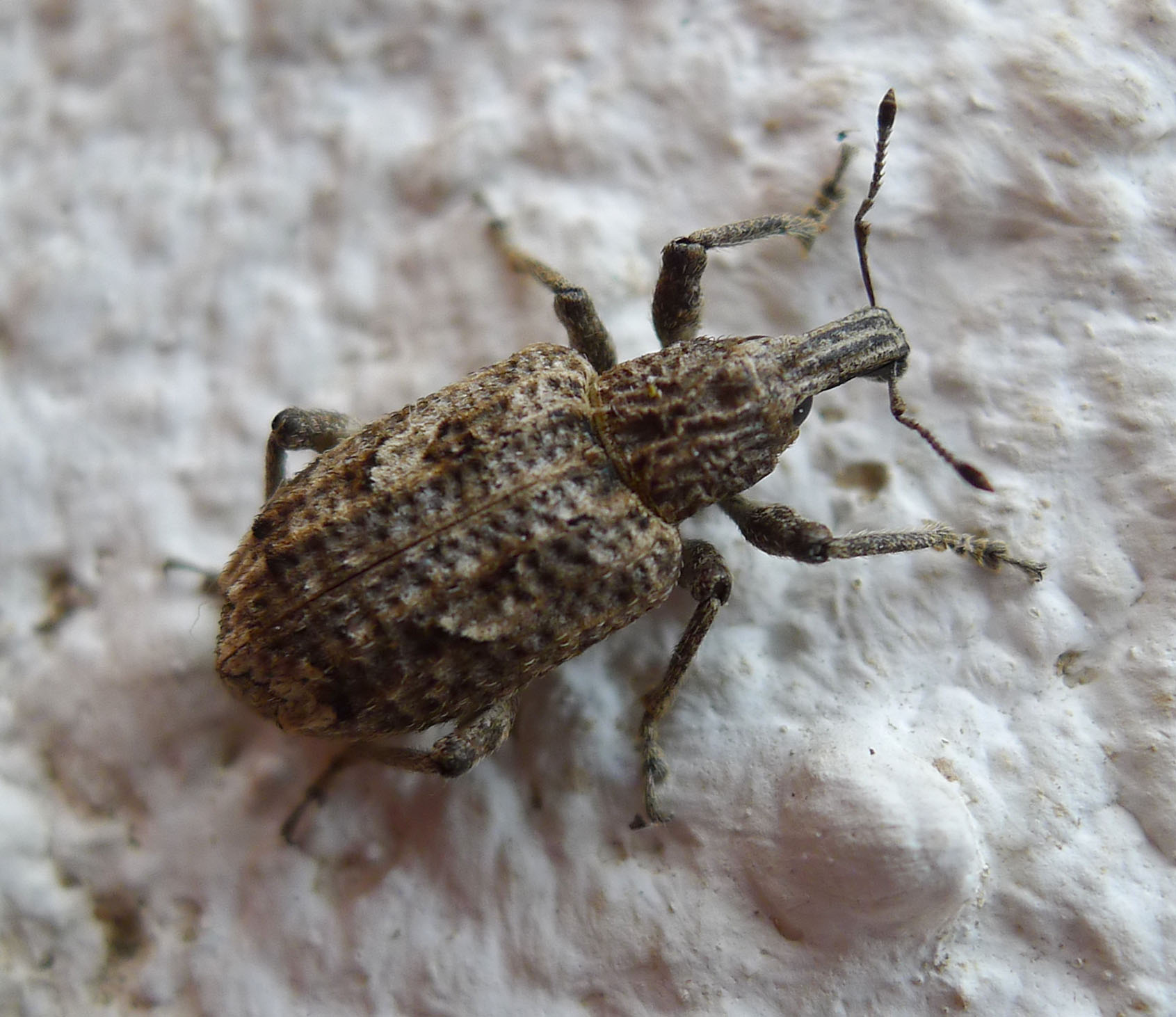
- Listroderes costirostris

Scientific classification
- Domain: Eukaryota
- Kingdom: Animalia
- Phylum: Arthropoda
- Class: Insecta
- Order: Coleoptera
- Suborder: Polyphaga
- Infraorder: Cucujiformia
- Family: Curculionidae
- Tribe: Listroderini
- Genus: Listroderes; Schönherr, 1826

= Listroderes =

Genus of beetles

Listroderes is a genus of underwater weevils, subfamily Cyclominae, in the beetle family Curculionidae. There are more than 170 described species in Listroderes.

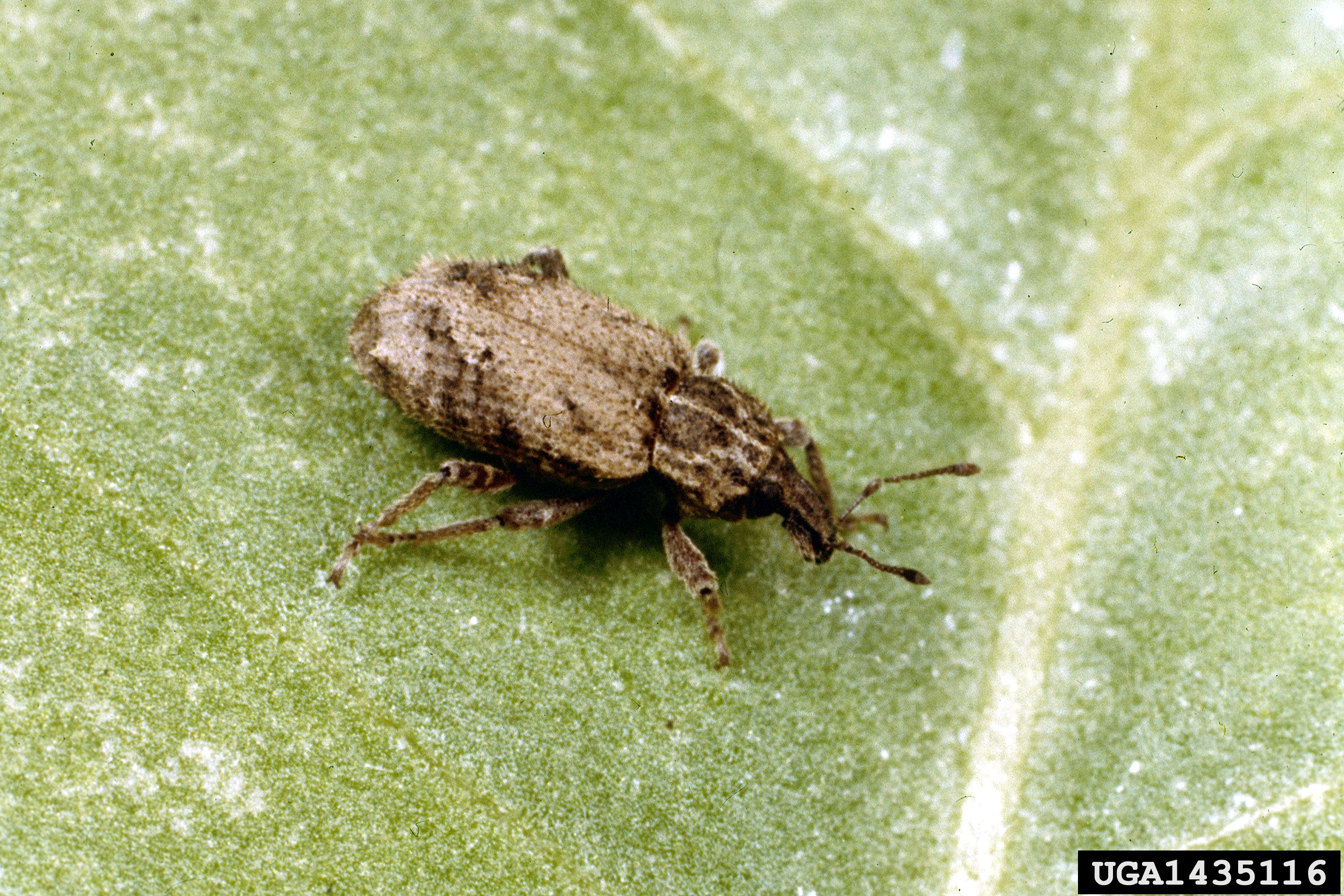
Listroderes costirostris

== See also ==
- List of Listroderes species
