= Dominion Range =

Mountain range in Antarctica

- Location within Antarctica

Geography
- Continent: Antarctica
- Region: Ross Dependency
- Range coordinates: 85°20′S 166°30′E
- Parent range: Queen Maud Mountains

The Dominion Range (85°20′S 166°30′E) is a broad mountain range, about 30 nautical miles (56 km; 35 mi) long, forming a prominent salient at the juncture of the Beardmore and Mill glaciers in Antarctica. The range is part of the Queen Maud Mountains The range was discovered by the British Antarctic Expedition, 1907–09 and named by Ernest Shackleton for the Dominion of New Zealand, which generously aided the expedition.

== Location ==
Plunket Point, at the northern tip of the Meyer Desert, is the northernmost point of the range, where the Mill Glacier to the east of the range converges with the Beardmore Glacier to the west. The Rutkowski Glacier forms to the west of the Meyer Desert and flows south past Mount mills. The Koski Glacier flows east past the Kane Rocks to the south and Browns Butte to the north into Mill Glacier. The Vandament Glacier is south of the Kane Rocks and west of Safety Spur. The south of the range includes Mount Saunders, Mount Nimrod and Mount Tennent. The Davis Nunataks and Mount Ward are to the south of the range.

The Polar Subglacial Basin lies between the Gamburtsev Subglacial Mountains and the Dominion Range.

== Key geographical features ==
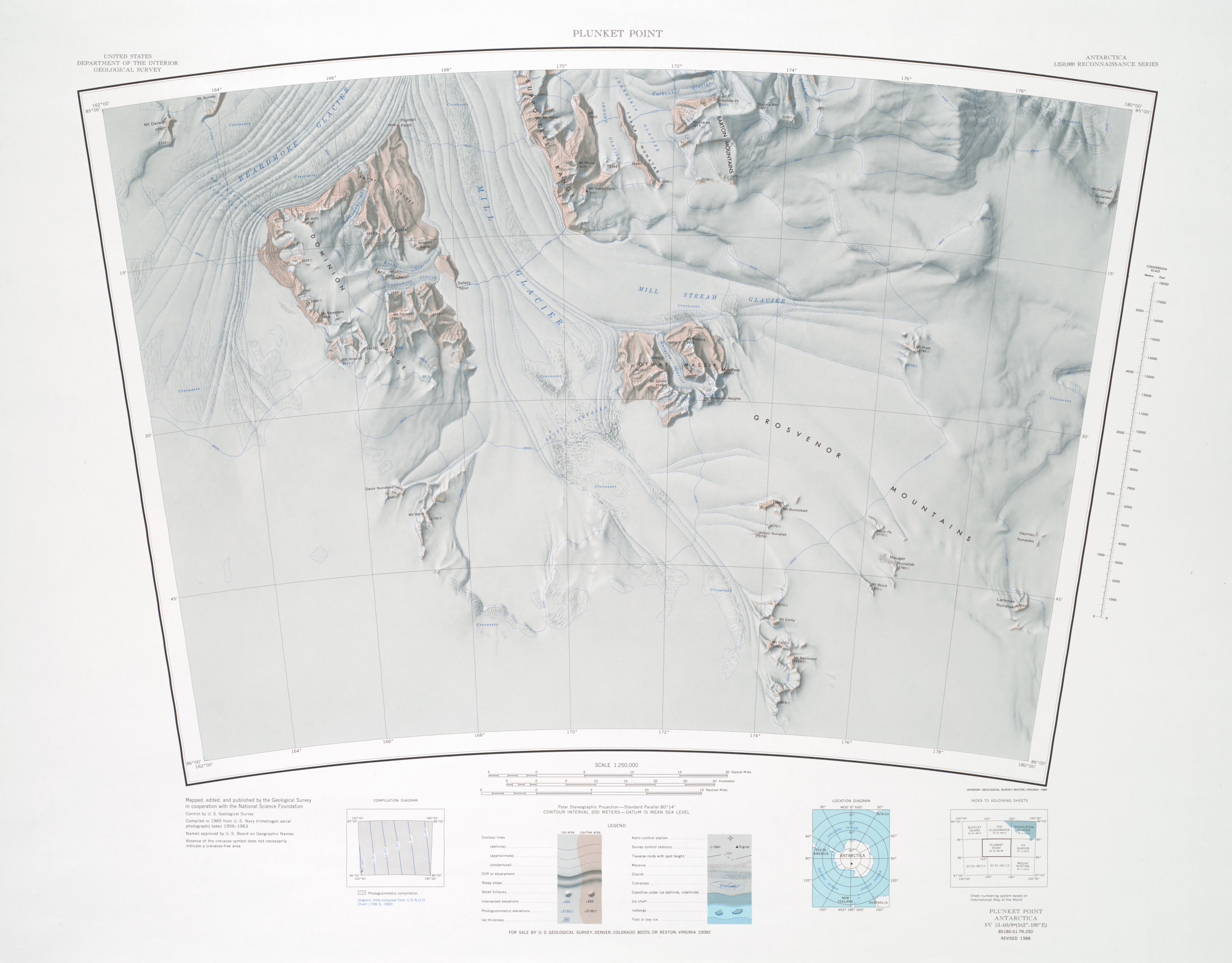
Southern Supports Range northwest of map

Features, from north to south, include:

=== Plunket Point ===
85°05′S 167°06′E. A conspicuous rock point marking the northern end of the Dominion Range and the confluence of the Beardmore and Mill Glaciers. Discovered by the British Antarctic Expedition (1907–09) and named for Lord Plunket, at that time Governor of New Zealand.

=== Meyer Desert ===
85°08′S 166°45′E. A triangular ice-free area of about 50 square nautical miles (170 km^{2}; 66 sq mi) at the north end of the Dominion Range, near the confluence of the Beardmore and Mill Glaciers. Named by New Zealand Geological Survey Antarctic Expedition (NZGSAE) (1961–62) for George Meyer of the United States Antarctic Research Program (USARP), who was scientific leader at McMurdo Station, 1961, and led a field party into this area, summer 1961-62.

=== Rutkowski Glacier ===
85°11′S 166°21′E. A glacier which drains the northern part of the Dominion Range icecap eastward of Mount Mills. It descends northeastward into Meyer Desert where it terminates without reaching Beardmore Glacier. Named by United States Advisory Committee on Antarctic Names (US-ACAN) for Richard L. Rutkowski, USARP meteorologist at the South Pole Station, 1962.

=== Mount Mills ===
85°12′S 165°17′E. A mountain, 2,955 metres (9,695 ft) high, forming part of the north escarpment of the Dominion Range, overlooking the Beardmore Glacier 8 nautical miles (15 km; 9.2 mi) north of Mount Saunders. Discovered by the British Antarctic Expedition (1907–09) and named for Sir James Mills who, with the government of New Zealand, paid the cost of towing the expedition ship Nimrod to Antarctica in 1908.

=== Kane Rocks ===
85°18′S 166°45′E. An east–west trending ridge, 3 nautical miles (5.6 km; 3.5 mi) long, forming a rock median between the upper reaches of Koski Glacier and Vandament Glacier in the Dominion Range. Named by US-ACAN for Henry Scott Kane, USARP cosmic rays scientist at South Pole Station, winter 1964; a member of the South Pole-Queen Maud Land Traverse, 1964–65 and 1965-66.

=== Browns Butte ===
85°15′S 167°30′E. A bare rock butte at the north side of the mouth of Koski Glacier in the Dominion Range. Named by US-ACAN for Craig W. Brown, USARP meteorologist at South Pole Station, 1963.

=== Vandament Glacier ===
85°19′S 167°10′E. An east-flowing glacier, 6 nautical miles (11 km; 6.9 mi) long, draining the east-central portion of the Dominion Range icecap. The glacier lies close south of Koski Glacier, whose flow it parallels, and terminates 2 nautical miles (3.7 km; 2.3 mi) NW of Safety Spur. Named by US-ACAN for Charles H. Vandament, USARP ionospheric physicist at South Pole Station, 1962.

=== Safety Spur ===
85°19′S 168°00′E. A small rock spur from the Dominion Range, extending southeast from a broad isolated prominence between the mouth of Vandament Glacier and the west side of Mill Glacier. So named by the Southern Party of the NZGSAE (1961–62) because it was at this landfall that the party arrived after their first crossing of Mill Glacier in November 1961.

=== Mount Saunders ===
85°21′S 165°26′E. A mountain, 2,895 metres (9,498 ft) high, forming a part of the west escarpment of the Dominion Range, 4.5 nautical miles (8.3 km; 5.2 mi) north-northwest of Mount Nimrod. Discovered by the British Antarctic Expedition (1907–09) and named for Edward Saunders, secretary to Shackleton, who assisted in preparing the narrative of the expedition.

=== Mount Nimrod ===
85°25′S 165°45′E. A mountain, 2,835 metres (9,301 ft) high, standing 4 nautical miles (7.4 km; 4.6 mi) south-southeast of Mount Saunders in the Dominion Range. Discovered by the British Antarctic Expedition (1907–09) and named after the expedition ship Nimrod.

=== Mount Tennent ===
85°22′S 166°45′E. A rocky peak, 2,895 metres (9,498 ft) high, in the Dominion Range, 2 nautical miles (3.7 km; 2.3 mi) south of Vandament Glacier. Named by the NZGSAE (1961–62) for W.B. Tennent, Minister in Charge of Scientific and Industrial Research, New Zealand.

=== Davis Nunataks ===
85°37′S 166°36′E. A small cluster of rock nunataks 3 nautical miles (5.6 km; 3.5 mi) northwest of Mount Ward, the feature being a southern outlier of the main body of the Dominion Range. Named by US-ACAN for Ronald N. Davis, USARP geomagnetist-seismologist at South Pole Station, winter 1963.

=== Mount Ward ===
85°40′S 167°10′E. A rock peak 3 nautical miles (5.6 km; 3.5 mi) southeast of Davis Nunataks, the feature being a southern outlier of the main body of the Dominion Range. Discovered by the British Antarctic Expedition (1907–09) and named for Sir Joseph George Ward, then Prime Minister of New Zealand, who gave the expedition considerable support.

== See also ==
- Meyer Desert Formation biota

== Sources ==
- Alberts, Fred G., ed. (1995), Geographic Names of the Antarctic (PDF) (2 ed.), United States Board on Geographic Names This article incorporates public domain material from websites or documents of the United States Board on Geographic Names.
- Plunket Point (PDF), USGS
- This article incorporates public domain material from websites or documents of the United States Geological Survey.
