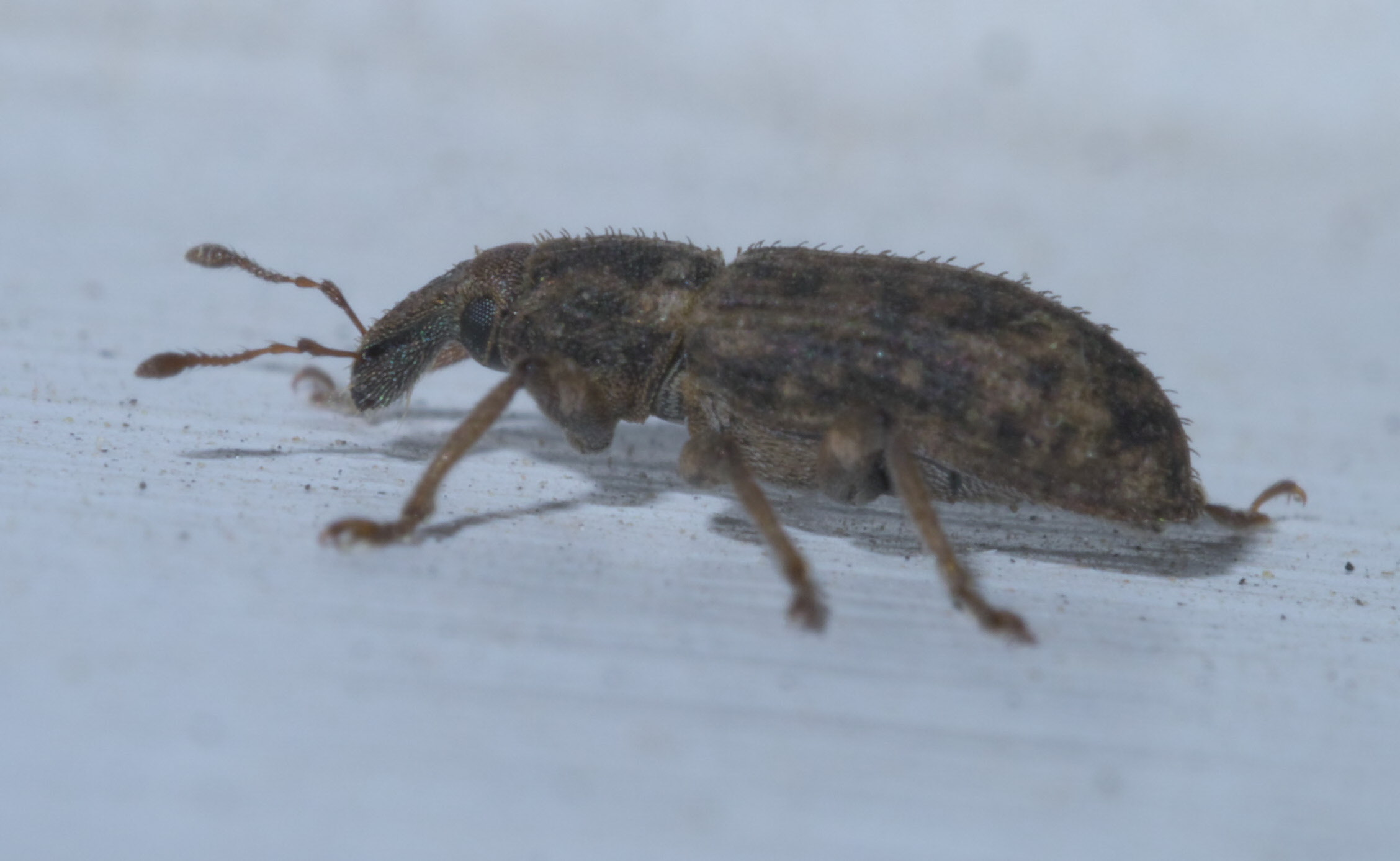
- Listronotus spp.

Scientific classification
- Kingdom: Animalia
- Phylum: Arthropoda
- Class: Insecta
- Order: Coleoptera
- Suborder: Polyphaga
- Infraorder: Cucujiformia
- Family: Curculionidae
- Genus: Listronotus; Jekel, 1865

Synonyms
- Hyperodes Jekel, 1865

= Listronotus =

Genus of beetles

Listronotus is a genus of weevil in the family Curculionidae. There are at least 100 described species in Listronotus.

== See also ==
- List of Listronotus species
