= Mount Clark =

Mount Clark may refer to:

- Mount Clark (California)
- Mount Clark (Washington), in the Olympic Mountains

Mount Clarke may refer to:

- Mount Clarke, a mountain in British Columbia, Canada
- Mount Frederick Clarke, a mountain in New Brunswick, Canada
- Mount Clarke (Antarctica)

== See also ==
- Clark Mountain (disambiguation)
- Clark Peak (disambiguation)
