= Queen Maud Mountains =

Major feature group in the Transantarctic Mountains

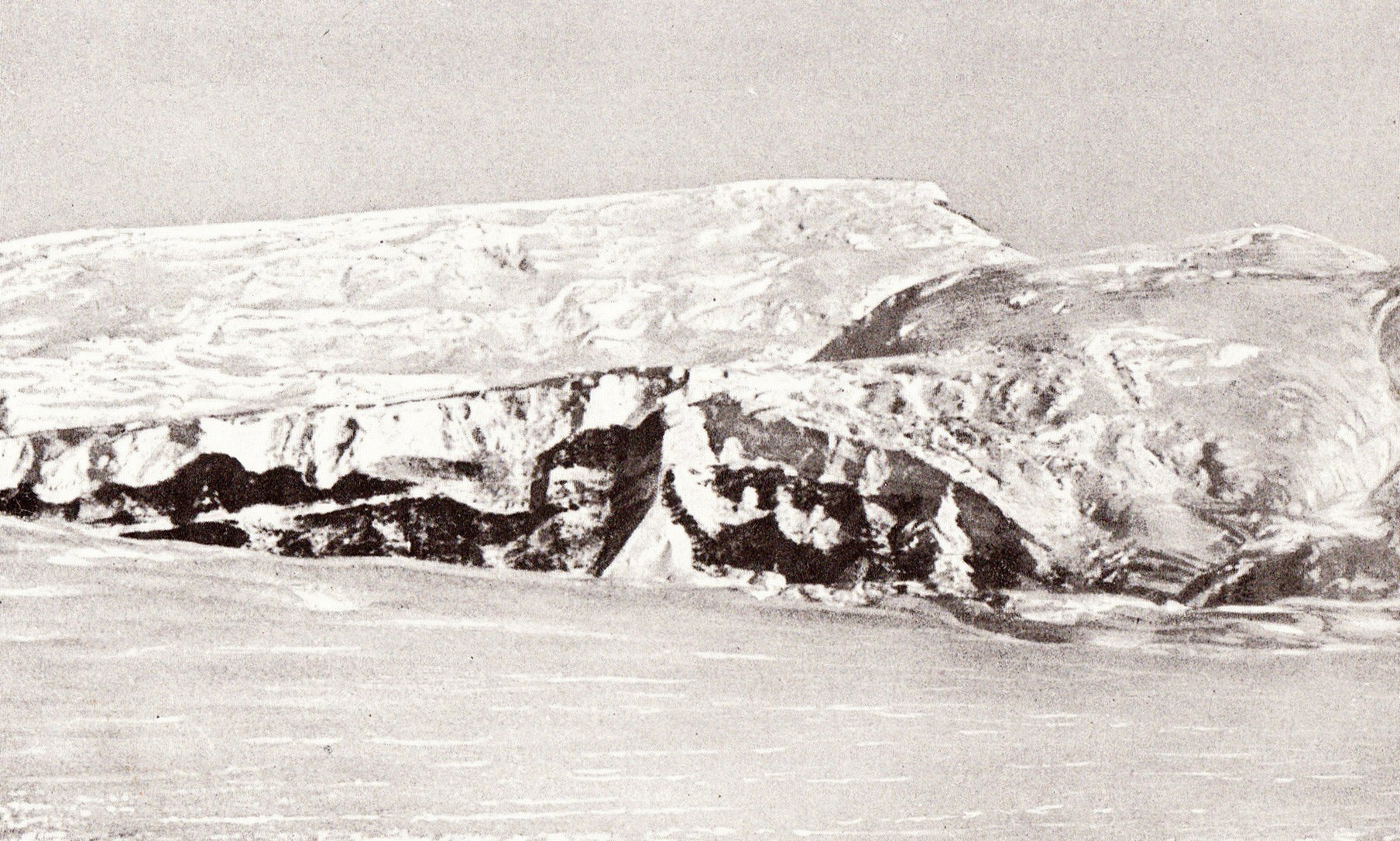
- Photo of Mount Fridtjof Nansen in the Queen Maud Mountains taken by Roald Amundsen

Highest point
- Peak: Mount Kaplan>
- Elevation: 4,230 m (13,880 ft)
- Coordinates: 84°33′00″S 175°19′00″W

Geography
- Location within Antarctica

The Queen Maud Mountains (86°00′S 160°00′W) are a major group of mountains, ranges and subordinate features of the Transantarctic Mountains, lying between the Beardmore and Reedy Glaciers and including the area from the head of the Ross Ice Shelf to the Antarctic Plateau in Antarctica. Captain Roald Amundsen and his South Pole party ascended Axel Heiberg Glacier near the central part of this group in November 1911, naming these mountains for the Norwegian queen Maud of Wales.

== Exploration and naming ==
Elevations bordering the Beardmore Glacier, at the western extremity of these mountains, were observed by the British expeditions led by Ernest Shackleton (1907–09) and Robert Falcon Scott (1910-13), but the mountains as a whole were mapped by several American expeditions led by Richard Evelyn Byrd (1930s and 1940s), and United States Antarctic Program (USARP) and New Zealand Antarctic Research Program (NZARP) expeditions from the 1950s through the 1970s.

== Appearance ==
The Sailing Directions for Antarctica (1960) describes the Queen Maud Range as follows: "From the Beardmore Glacier the horst trends east-southeastward an undetermined distance. The Prince Olaf Mountains stretch from the Beardmore Glacier to the Liv Glacier. (Note: In fact, the Prince Olav Mountains stretch from Shackleton Glacier to Liv Glacier.) Near 84°S 175°E a large glacier trends southward. Eastward of 175°E. the escarpment is fronted for about 50 miles by high gneissic foothills which are fronted by an expansive piedmont inundating the lower heights. In about 84°30′S 175°00′W the Shackleton Glacier (Wade Glacier), a vast straight-walled glacier about 12 miles wide, extends southward to the polar plateau.

"At this point the scarp appears broken by a transverse fault which displaces the horst northward to Mount Wade (Mount Bush), a beacon sandstone massif rising to at least 14,000 feet above sea level, dominating the eastern flank of this remarkable valley glacier. Eastward of Mount Wade stand the Fisher Mountains, which form the western flank of the Liv Glacier. Bush Mountains, lying just eastward of the mouth of Shackleton Glacier, are a group of ragged foothills rising to a height of 4,000 feet.

"Viewed from northward the Queen Maud Range presents a vast array of low-lying peaks which increase progressively in height to the southward where, about 15 miles from the shelf ice, stand great tabular mountain masses, 13,000 feet high, having a sharply defined fault-line scarp on the northern side. The northern foothills are dark-colored gneisses and schists with veins of granite and quartz. These foothills show marked glacierization with well-developed cirques and aretes. The high tabular mountains of the horst, are regular and even in outline, presenting broad domes with precipitous fronts to the north showing the granite structure capped by a series of horizontally bedded sandstone with intruded dolerite sills."

== Glaciers ==
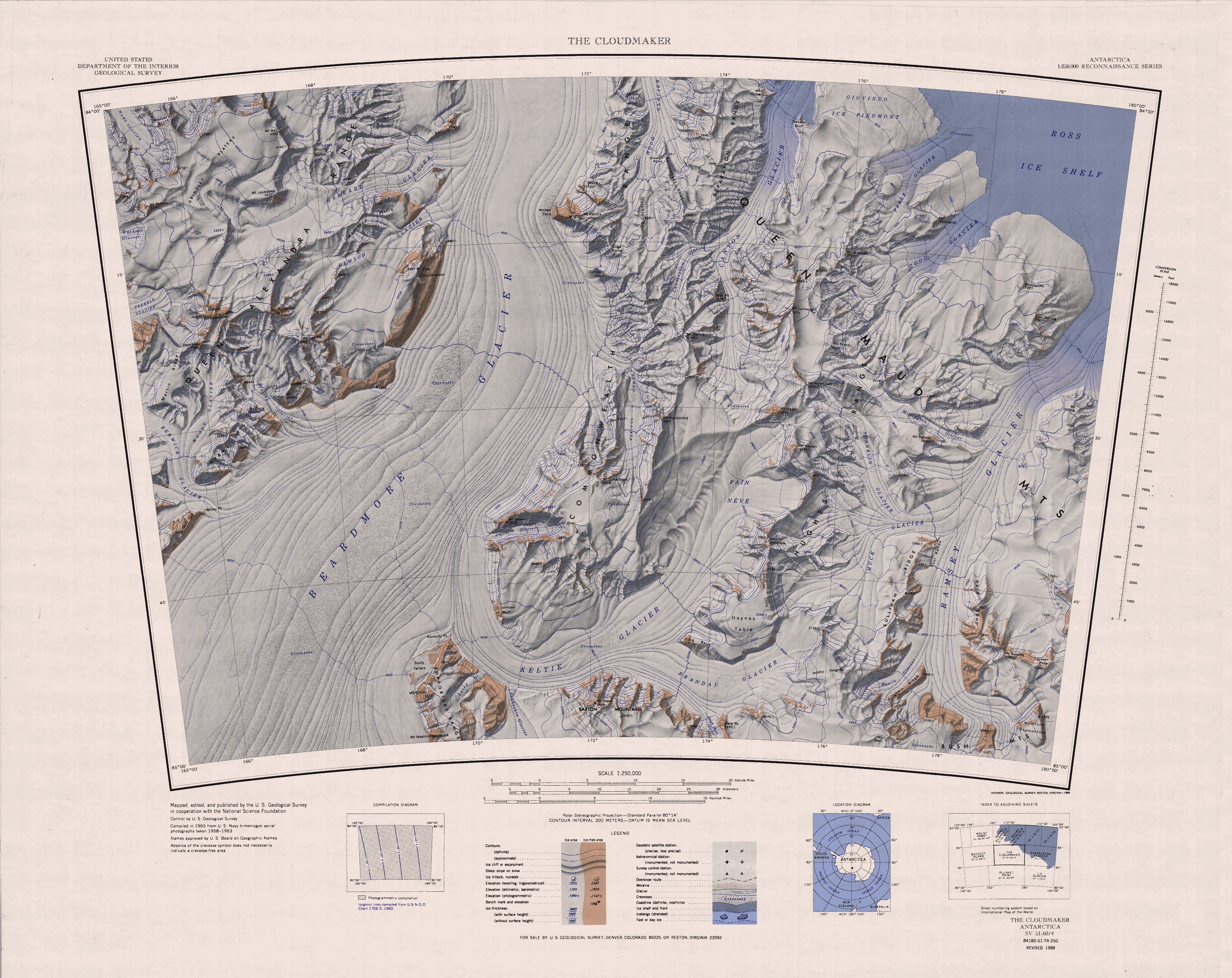
Beardmore Glacier to east

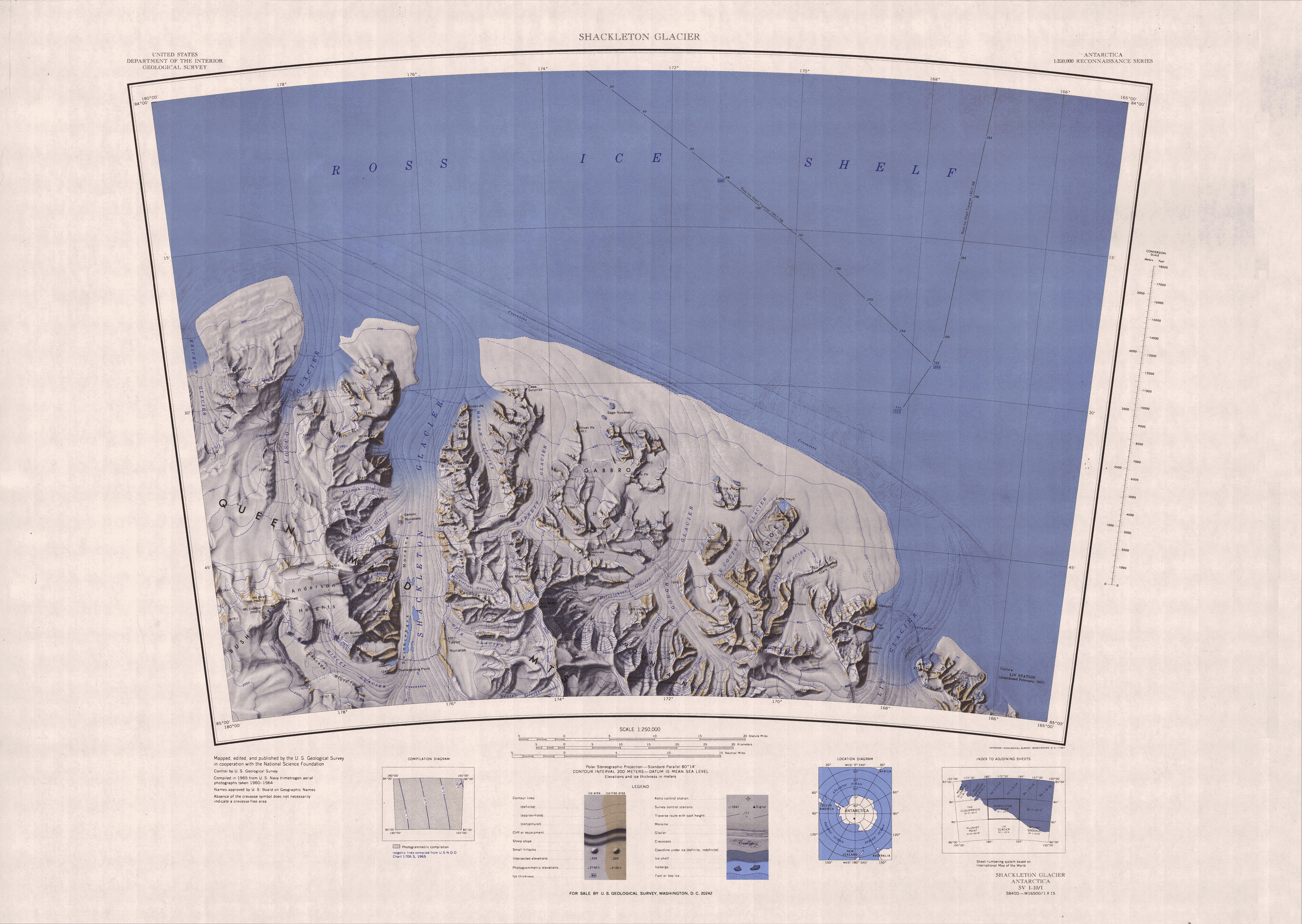
Shackleton to Liv

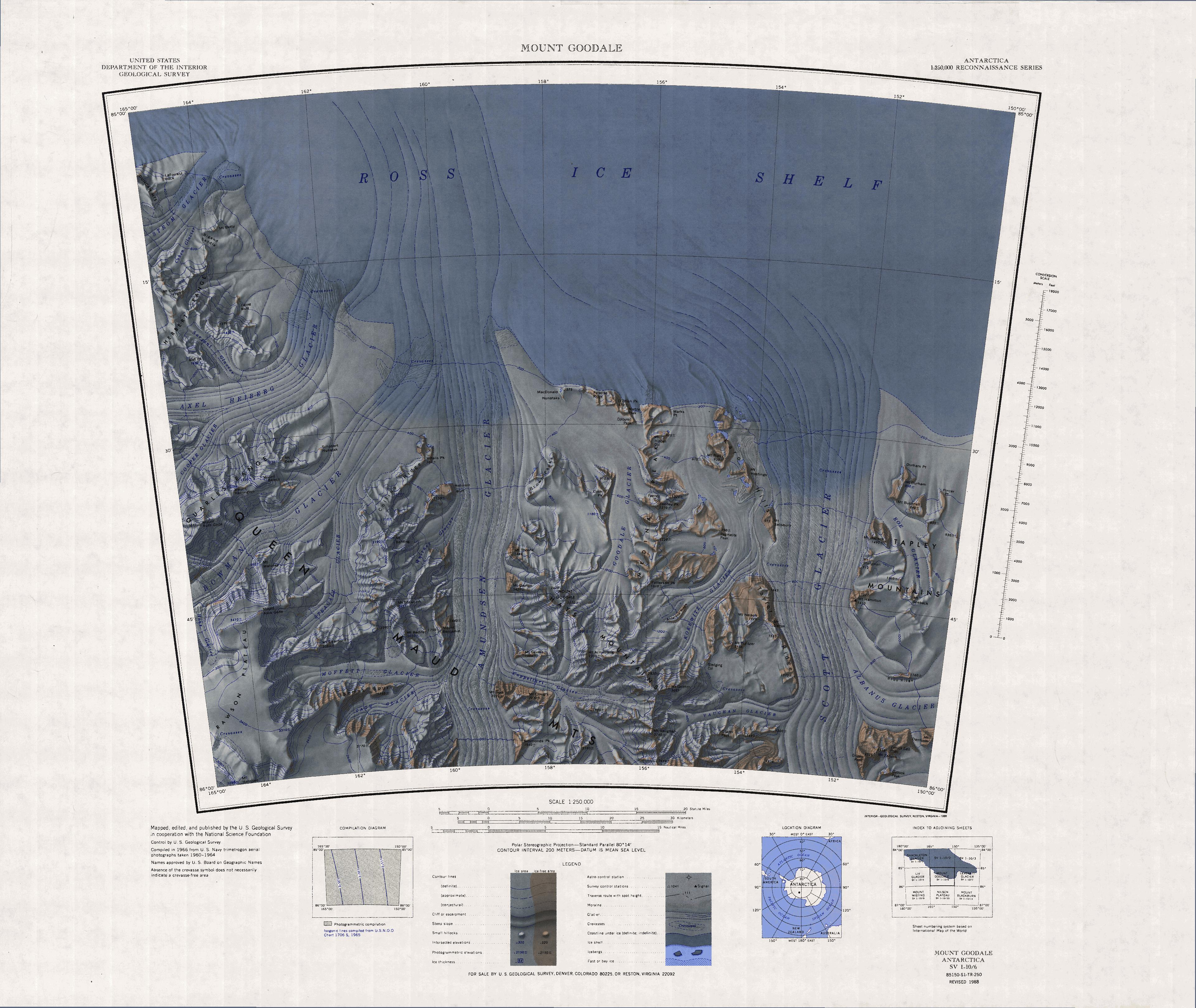
Amundsen in center

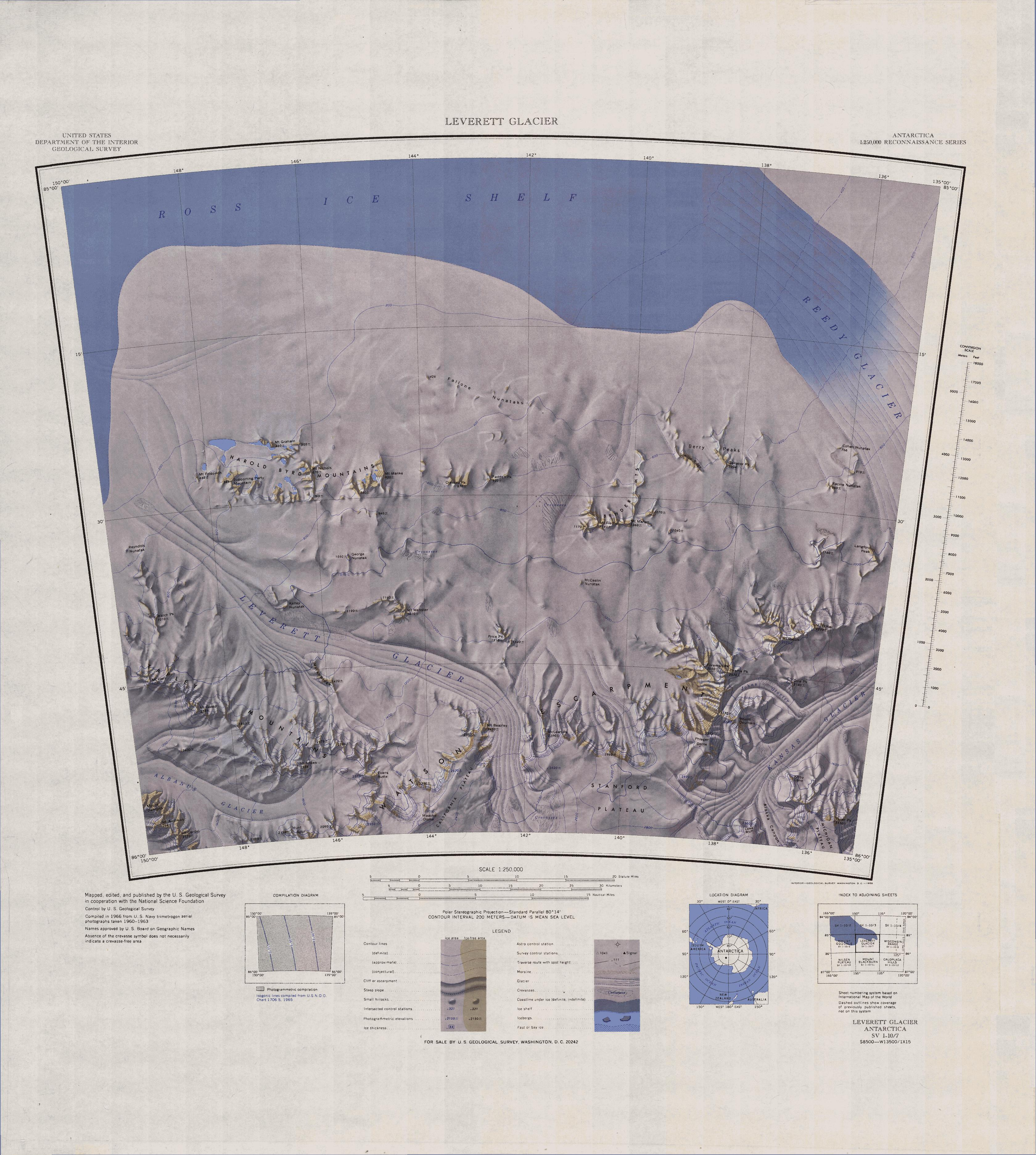
Reedy Glacier in east

The Queen Maud Mountains are crossed by several major glaciers that flow from the Antarctic Plateau to the Ross Ice Shelf, and divide the mountains.

- The Beardmore Glacier is one of the largest valley glaciers in the world, being 200 km (125 mi) long and having a width of 40 km (25 mi). It descends about 7,200 feet (2,200 m) from the Antarctic Plateau to the Ross Ice Shelf and is bordered by the Commonwealth Range on the eastern side and the Queen Alexandra Range on the western.
- The Shackleton Glacier is a major glacier, over 60 nautical miles (110 km; 69 mi) long and from 5 to 10 nautical miles (9.3 to 18.5 km; 5.8 to 11.5 mi) wide, descending from the Antarctic Plateau from the vicinity of Roberts Massif and flowing north through the Queen Maud Mountains to enter the Ross Ice Shelf between Mount Speed and Waldron Spurs.
- The Liv Glacier is a steep valley glacier, 40 nautical miles (74 km; 46 mi) long, emerging from the Antarctic Plateau just southeast of Barnum Peak and draining north through the Queen Maud Mountains to enter Ross Ice Shelf between Mayer Crags and the Duncan Mountains.
- The Amundsen Glacier is a major Antarctic glacier, about 4 to 6 nautical miles (7.4 to 11.1 km; 4.6 to 6.9 mi) wide and 80 nautical miles (150 km; 92 mi) long. It originates on the Antarctic Plateau where it drains the area to the south and west of Nilsen Plateau, then descends through the Queen Maud Mountains to enter the Ross Ice Shelf just west of the MacDonald Nunataks.
- The Scott Glacier is a major glacier, 120 nautical miles (220 km; 140 mi) long, that drains the East Antarctic Ice Sheet through the Queen Maud Mountains to the Ross Ice Shelf.
- The Reedy Glacier is a major glacier, over 100 nautical miles (190 km; 120 mi) long and 6 to 12 nautical miles (11 to 22 km; 6.9 to 13.8 mi) wide, descending from the polar plateau to the Ross Ice Shelf between the Michigan Plateau and Wisconsin Range. It marks the limits of the Queen Maud Mountains on the west and the Horlick Mountains on the east.

Other glaciers with outlets on the Ross Ice Shelf include

- Canyon Glacier, Giovinco Ice Piedmont, Perez Glacier, Good Glacier, Ramsey Glacier, Erickson Glacier and Kosco Glacier between the Beardmore and Shackleton glaciers.
- Barrett Glacier, Gough Glacier, Le Couteur Glacier, Morris Glacier between the Shackleton and Liv glaciers.
- Strom Glacier, Axel Heiberg Glacier, Bowman Glacier between the Liv and Amundsen glaciers.
- Goodale Glacier, Koerwitz Glacier between the Amundsen and Scott glaciers.
- Leverett Glacier between the Scott and Reedy glaciers.

These glaciers in turn are generally fed by smaller valley glaciers.

== Mountain ranges ==
=== Beardmore–Shackleton ===
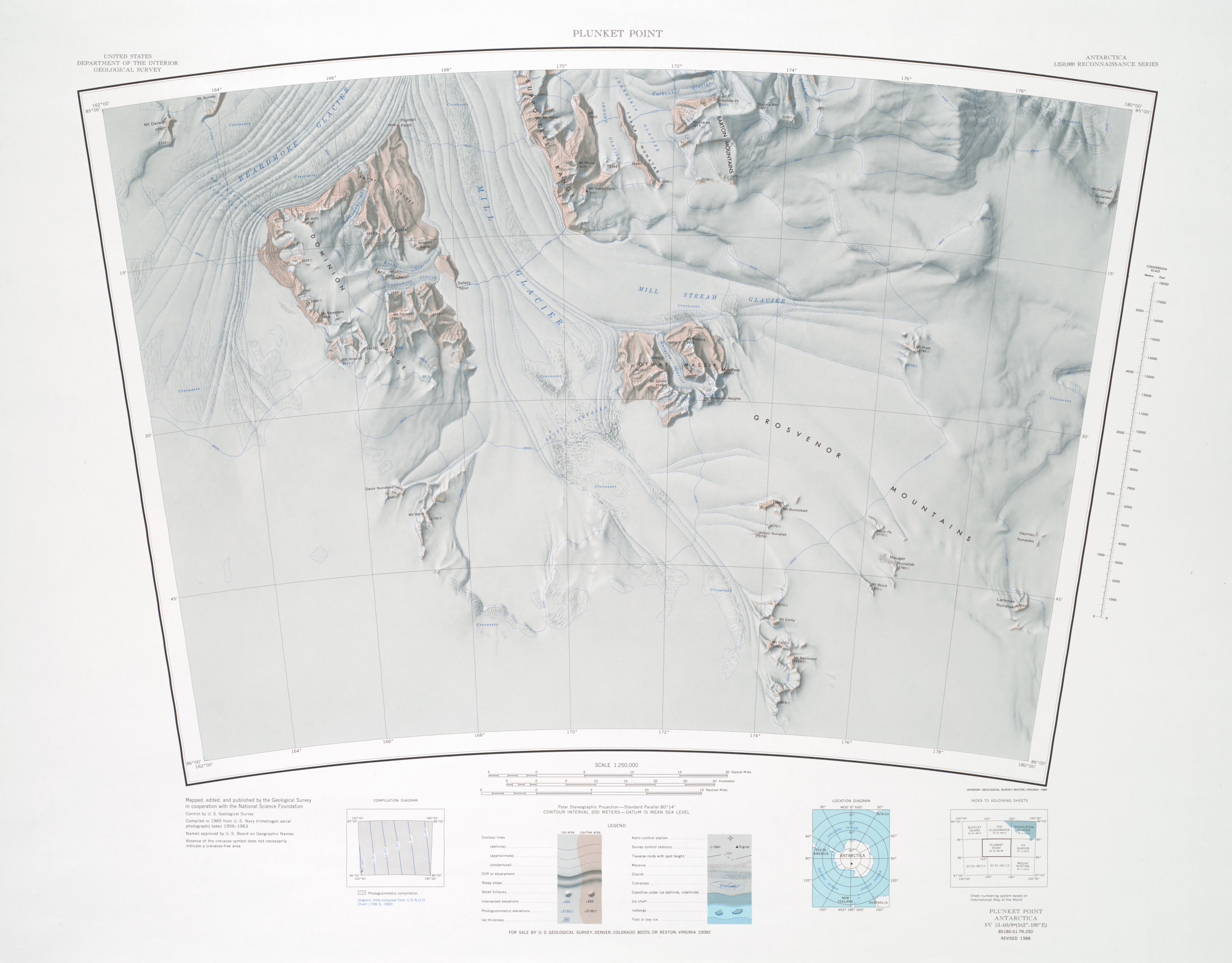
Inland from the east of the Beardmore Glacier

Mountain groups or ranges between Beardmore Glacier and Shackleton Glacier include:

- Commonwealth Range, a north-south trending range of rugged mountains, 60 nautical miles (110 km; 69 mi) long. The range borders the eastern side of Beardmore Glacier from Keltie Glacier to the Ross Ice Shelf.
- Separation Range, the northeastern branch of the Commonwealth Range. The branch starts at about 84°20'S, and forms two chains of mountains separated by Hood Glacier. The Separation Range, about 30 nautical miles (56 km; 35 mi) long, terminates to the north at the Ross Ice Shelf.
- Hughes Range, a high massive north–south trending mountain range in Antarctica, surmounted by six prominent summits, of which Mount Kaplan at 4,230 metres (13,880 ft) is the highest. The range is located east of Canyon Glacier and extends 45 nautical miles (83 km; 52 mi) from the confluence of Brandau Glacier and Keltie Glacier in the south, to the Giovinco Ice Piedmont in the north.
- Supporters Range, a rugged range 25 nautical miles (46 km; 29 mi) long, bordering the eastern side of Mill Glacier, from Keltie Glacier in the north to Mill Stream Glacier in the south.
- Dominion Range, a broad mountain range, about 30 nautical miles (56 km; 35 mi) long, forming a prominent salient at the juncture of the Beardmore and Mill glaciers.
- Barton Mountains, a group of mountains located south of the Commonwealth Range and the Hughes Range and bounded by Keltie Glacier, Brandau Glacier, Leigh Hunt Glacier, and Snakeskin Glacier.
- Grosvenor Mountains, a group of widely scattered mountains and nunataks rising above the polar plateau east of the head of Mill Glacier, extending from Mount Pratt in the north to the Mount Raymond area in the south, and from Otway Massif in the northwest to Larkman Nunatak in the southeast.
- Bush Mountains, a series of rugged elevations at the heads of the Ramsey and Kosco glaciers. The Bush Mountains extend from Mount Weir in the west to Anderson Heights overlooking Shackleton Glacier in the east.
- Erb Range, a rugged mountain range rising to 2,240 metres (7,350 ft) between Kosco Glacier and Shackleton Glacier, and extending north from Anderson Heights to Mount Speed on the west side of the Ross Ice Shelf.

=== Shackleton–Liv ===
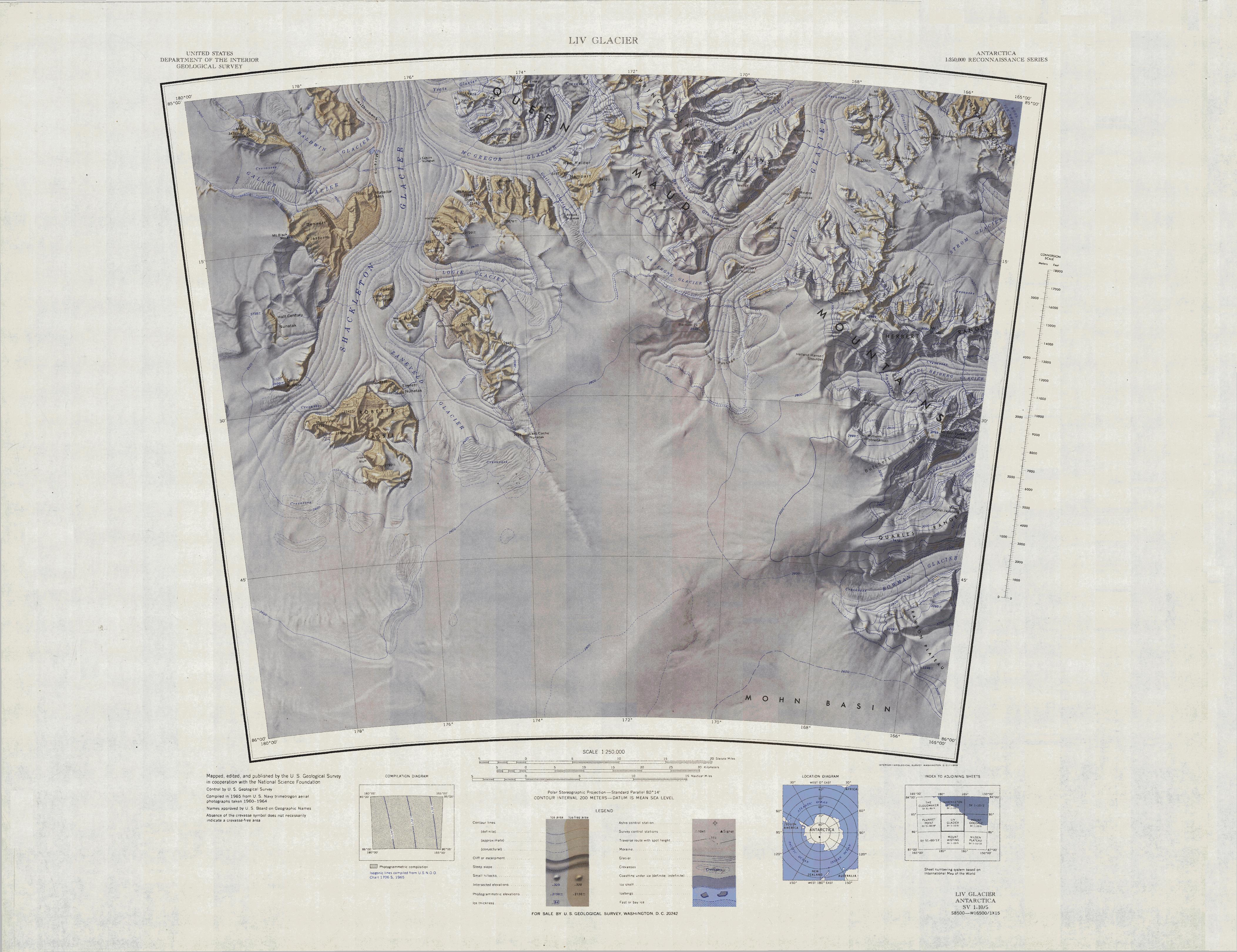
Inland mountains. Shackleton Glacier to the west, Liv Glacier to extreme east

Mountain groups or ranges between Shackleton Glacier and Liv Glacier include:

- Prince Olav Mountains, a mountain group stretching from Shackleton Glacier to Liv Glacier at the head of the Ross Ice Shelf.
- Gabbro Hills, a group of rugged ridges and coastal hills which border Ross Ice Shelf between Barrett Glacier and Gough Glacier and extend south to Ropebrake Pass.
- Lillie Range extends northward from the Prince Olav Mountains to the Ross Ice Shelf. Mounts Hall, Daniel, Krebs and Mason are in the range.
- Roberts Massif, a remarkable snow-free massif at the head of Shackleton Glacier. It rises to over 2,700 metres (8,900 ft) and is about 60 square nautical miles (210 km^{2}; 79 sq mi) in area.
- Cumulus Hills, several groups of largely barren hills. Divided by the Logie Glacier, they are bounded by Shackleton Glacier on the west, McGregor Glacier on the north and Zaneveld Glacier on the south.

=== Liv–Amundsen ===
Mountain groups or ranges between Liv Glacier and Amundsen Glacier include:

- Duncan Mountains, a group of rugged coastal foothills, about 18 nautical miles (33 km; 21 mi) long, extending from the mouth of Liv Glacier to the mouth of Strom Glacier.
- Herbert Range, a range extending from the edge of the Antarctic Plateau to the Ross Ice Shelf between the Axel Heiberg Glacier and Strom Glacier.
- Quarles Range, a high and rugged range extending from the polar plateau between Cooper Glacier and Bowman Glacier and terminating near the edge of Ross Ice Shelf.

=== Amundsen–Scott ===
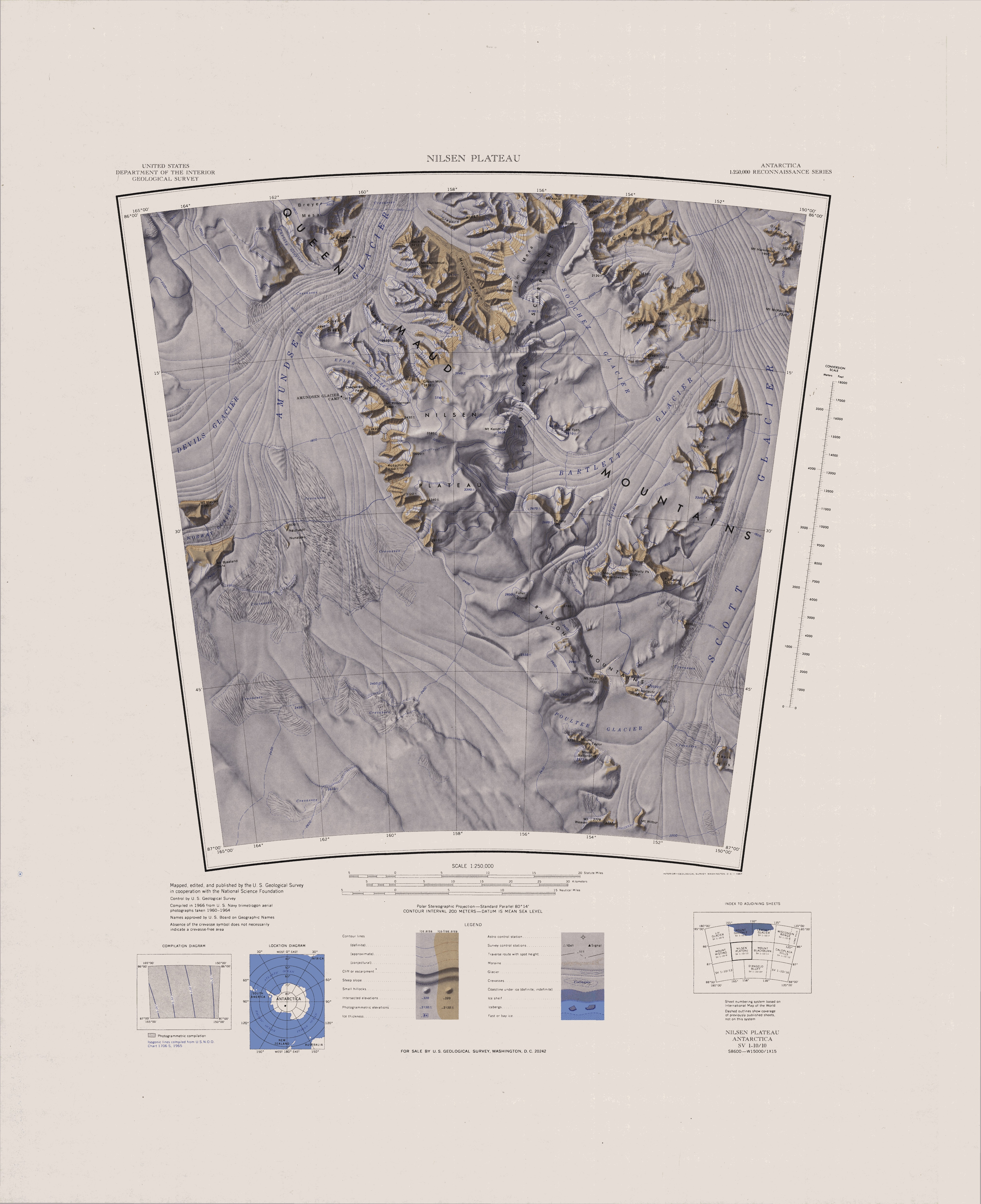
Upper Amundsen Glacier (west), Scott (east)

Mountain groups or ranges between Amundsen Glacier and Scott Glacier include:

- Hays Mountains, a large group of mountains and peaks surmounting the divide between the lower portions of Amundsen Glacier and Scott Glacier and extending from the vicinity of Mount Thorne on the northwest to Mount Dietz on the southeast.
- Medina Peaks, rugged, mainly ice-free, peaks surmounting a ridge 15 nautical miles (28 km; 17 mi) long, extending north along the east side of Goodale Glacier to the edge of the Ross Ice Shelf.
- Karo Hills, rounded, ice-free foothills extending for 12 nautical miles (22 km; 14 mi) along the west side of the terminus of Scott Glacier, from Mount Salisbury north-northwest to the edge of the Ross Ice Shelf.
- Nilsen Plateau, a rugged, ice-covered plateau in Antarctica. When including Fram Mesa, the plateau is about 30 nautical miles (56 km; 35 mi) long and 1 to 12 nautical miles (1.9 to 22.2 km; 1.2 to 13.8 mi) wide, rising to 3,940 metres (12,930 ft) high between the upper reaches of the Amundsen and Scott glaciers.
- Rawson Mountains, a crescent-shaped range of tabular, ice-covered mountains including Fuller Dome, Mount Wyatt and Mount Verlautz, standing southeast of Nilsen Plateau and extending southeast for 18 nautical miles (33 km; 21 mi) to the west side of Scott Glacier.

=== Scott–Reedy ===
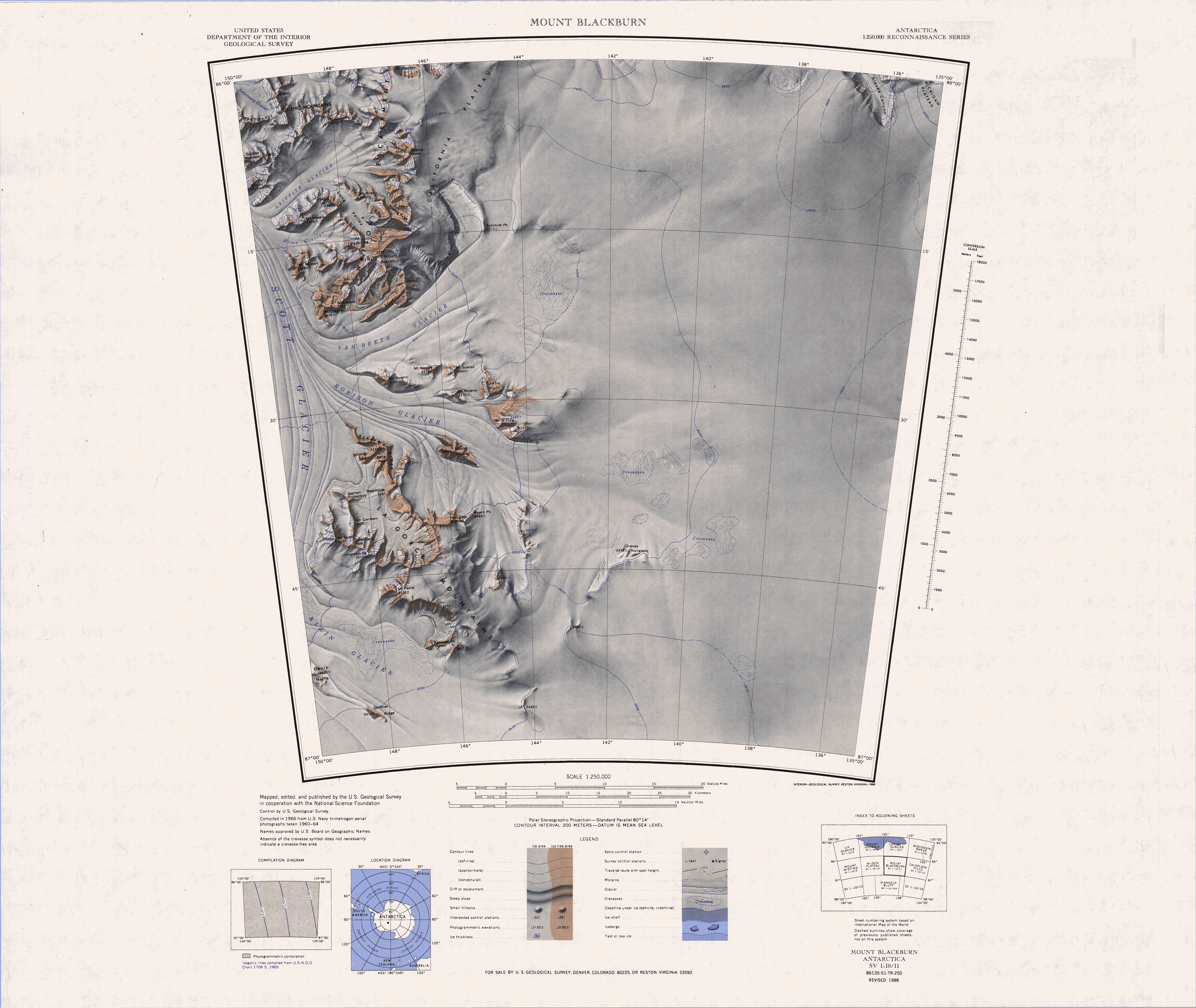
Scott Glacier to west of map

Mountain groups or ranges between Scott Glacier and Reedy Glacier include:

- Watson Escarpment, a major escarpment trending northward along the east margin of Scott Glacier, then eastward to Reedy Glacier where it turns southward along the glacier's west side. Somewhat arcuate, the escarpment is nearly 100 nautical miles (190 km; 120 mi) long, rises 3,550 metres (11,650 ft) above sea level, and 1,000 to 1,500 metres (3,300 to 4,900 ft) above the adjacent terrain.
- Gothic Mountains, a group of mountains, 20 nautical miles (37 km; 23 mi) long, located west of Watson Escarpment and bounded by Scott Glacier, Albanus Glacier, and Griffith Glacier.
- La Gorce Mountains, a group of mountains, 20 nautical miles (37 km; 23 mi) long, standing between the tributary Robison Glacier and Klein Glacier at the east side of the upper reaches of the Scott Glacier.
- Tapley Mountains, a range of mountains fronting on the eastern side of the Scott Glacier, extending eastward for 35 nautical miles (65 km; 40 mi) between Leverett Glacier and Albanus Glacier.
- Harold Byrd Mountains, a group of exposed mountains and nunataks which extend in an east–west direction between the lower part of Leverett Glacier and the head of the Ross Ice Shelf.
- Bender Mountains, a small group of mountains 4 nautical miles (7.4 km; 4.6 mi) southwest of the Berry Peaks, between the southeast edge of the Ross Ice Shelf and the Watson Escarpment.

=== Other features ===
- The Quartz Hills is an arcuate cluster of largely ice-free hills and peaks found immediately south of Colorado Glacier along the west side of Reedy Glacier.
- The Caloplaca Hills are a distinctive group of rock hills including Mount Carmer and Heathcock Peak, lying east of the Watson Escarpment on the west side of Reedy Glacier.
- Titan Dome is a large ice dome on the polar plateau, trending east–west and rising to 3,100 metres (10,200 ft) between the Queen Maud Mountains and the South Pole. The dome was first crossed by the sledge parties of Shackleton, Amundsen, and Scott on their journeys toward the South Pole, and was described as a major snow ridge. It was delineated by the SPRI-NFS-TUD airborne radio echo sounding program, 1967–79, and named after the Cambridge University (U.K.) Titan computer, which was used to process all the early radio echo sounding data for this part of Antarctica.

== See also ==
- List of mountains of Queen Maud Land

== Sources ==
- Alberts, Fred G., ed. (1995), Geographic Names of the Antarctic (PDF) (2 ed.), United States Board on Geographic Names This article incorporates public domain material from websites or documents of the United States Board on Geographic Names.
- "Beardmore Glacier", www.britannica.com, Encyclopædia Britannica, Inc.
- "Erb Range", Geographic Names Information System, United States Geological Survey, United States Department of the Interior
- Mount Goodale, USGS: United States Geological Survey
- Nilsen Plateau, USGS: United States Geological Survey
- "Queen Maud Mountains", Peakbagger
- Sailing Directions for Antarctica: Including the Off-Lying Islands South of Latitude 60 Degrees S. (2 ed.), United States. Hydrographic Office, 1960, hdl:2346/88464 This article incorporates public domain material from websites or documents of the United States Hydrographic Office.
- Shackleton Glacier, USGS: United States Geological Survey
- The Cloudmaker, USGS
- This article incorporates public domain material from websites or documents of the United States Geological Survey.
