= Hughes Range (Antarctica) =

Mountain range in Antarctica

- Location within Antarctica

Geography
- Continent: Antarctica
- Range coordinates: 84°30′S 175°30′E

The Hughes Range (84°30′S 175°30′E) is a high massive north–south trending mountain range in Antarctica, surmounted by six prominent summits, of which Mount Kaplan at 4,230 metres (13,880 ft) is the highest. The range is located east of Canyon Glacier in the Queen Maud Mountains and extends 45 nautical miles (83 km; 52 mi) from the confluence of Brandau Glacier and Keltie Glacier in the south, to the Giovinco Ice Piedmont in the north.

== Discovery and naming ==
The Hughes Range was discovered and photographed by Rear Admiral Richard E. Byrd on the baselaying flight of November 18, 1929. It was named by the Advisory Committee on Antarctic Names (US-ACAN) on the recommendation of Byrd for Charles Evans Hughes, U.S. secretary of state, U.S. chief justice, and adviser/counselor of Byrd.

== Location ==
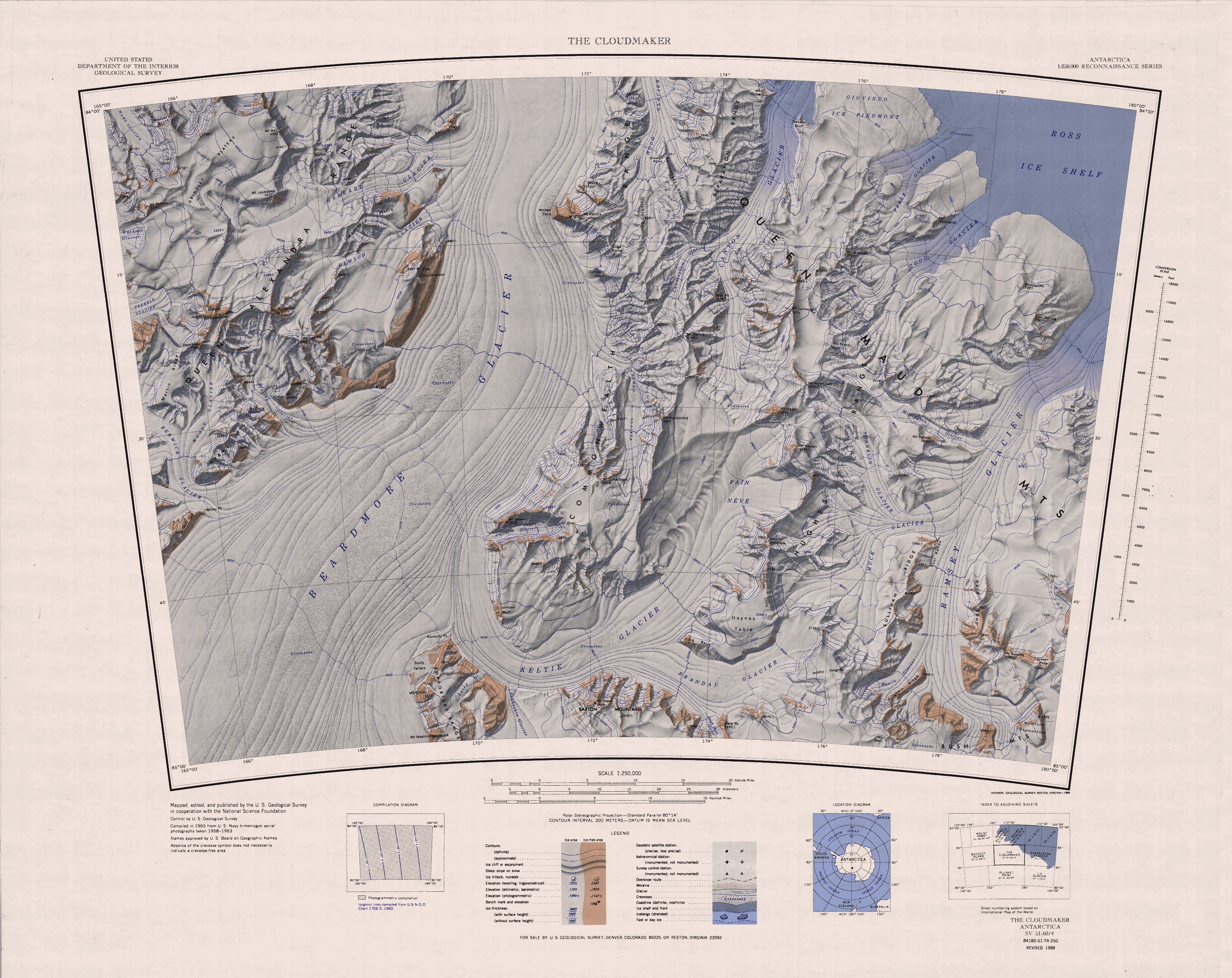
Hughes Range to the north center, between Pain Névé / Canyon Glacier to the west and Ramsey Glacier to the east

The Hughes Range runs southwest–northeast to the Giovinco Ice Piedmont on the Ross Ice Shelf. It is separated from the Commonwealth Range and the Separation Range to the west by the Keltie Glacier, Pain Névé and Canyon Glacier. The Brandau Glacier and Muck Glacier define the southern boundary. The Barton Mountains and Bush Mountains are to their south. The Shanklin Glacier and the Ramsey Glacier define the east side of the range.

Features of the Hughes Range, from south to north, include Ford Spur, Haynes Table, Campbell Cliffs and Mount Odishaw to the south of Pain Névé. Above Pain Névé are Mount Kaplan, Mount Wexler and Mount Weterman. To the east, Mount Valinski is south of the Millington Glacier, a tributary of the Ramsey Glacier. Further north are Mount Bronk, Mount Cartwright, Mount Brennan and Mount Reinhardt at the mouth of the Good Glacier. Den Hartog and Woodall Peak are on the promontary between Good Glacier and Ramsey Glacier. Husky Heights, Sullivan Ridge and Four Ramps lie to the southeast of the range.

== Features ==
=== Ford Spur ===
84°51′S 173°50′E. A prominent spur which marks the southwest extremity of Haynes Table, and the confluence of Keltie Glacier and Brandau Glacier. Named by the New Zealand Geological Survey Antarctic Expedition (1961–62) for C. Reginald Ford, Stores Officer for Scott's British National Antarctic Expedition (1901–04).

=== Haynes Table ===
84°49′S 174°35′E. A high, snow-covered mesa, some 8 nautical miles (15 km; 9.2 mi) across and rising to 3,390 metres (11,120 ft) high, located south of Mount Odishaw, between the heads of Keltie Glacier and Brandau Glacier. Discovered and photographed by United States Navy Squadron VX-6 on the flight of Jan. 12-13, 1956. Named by United States Advisory Committee on Antarctic Names (US-ACAN) for B.C. Haynes, meteorologist of the U.S. Weather Bureau on United States Navy Operation Highjump 1946-47.

=== Campbell Cliffs ===
84°46′S 174°55′E. A line of high, precipitous cliffs, mostly snow covered, forming the east wall of Haynes Table. Discovered and photographed by United States Navy Operation Highjump on Flight 8A of February 16, 1947. Named by US-ACAN for Commander Clifford M. Campbell, United States Navy, senior officer on this flight.

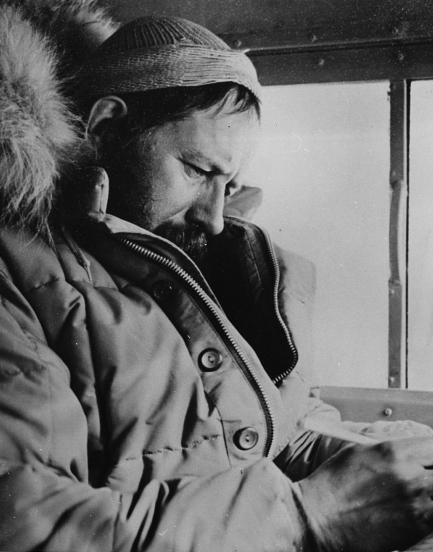
Albert Paddock Crary, who surveyed the range, in 1959

=== Mount Odishaw ===
84°42′S 174°54′E. A high, prominent mountain, 3,965 metres (13,009 ft) high, forming a distinctive landmark 9 nautical miles (17 km; 10 mi) south-southwest of Mount Kaplan. Discovered and photographed by Rear Admiral Byrd on the Baselaying Flight of Nov. 18, 1929, and surveyed by Albert P. Crary in 1957-58. Named by the latter for Hugh Odishaw, Executive Secretary of the U.S. National Committee for the IGY.

=== Mount Kaplan ===
84°33′S 175°19′E. A massive mountain, highest in the Hughes Range, standing 3 nautical miles (5.6 km; 3.5 mi) southeast of Mount Wexler. Discovered and photographed by Rear Admiral Byrd on the Baselaying Flight of Nov. 18, 1929, and surveyed by A.P. Crary in 1957-58. Named by the latter for Joseph Kaplan, Chairman of the United States National Committee for the International Geophysical Year (IGY), 1957-58.

=== Mount Wexler ===
84°30′S 175°01′E. A prominent ice-free mountain, 4,025 metres (13,205 ft) high, standing 3 nautical miles (5.6 km; 3.5 mi) southwest of Mount Waterman. Discovered and photographed by Rear Admiral Byrd on the Baselaying Flight of Nov. 18, 1929, and surveyed by A.P. Crary in 1957-58. Named by Crary for Harry Wexler, Chief Scientist for U.S. Antarctic International Geophysical Year programs, 1957-58.

=== Mount Waterman ===
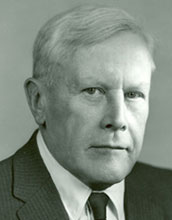
Alan Tower Waterman (Mount Waterman)

84°27′S 175°25′E. A massive mountain, 3,880 metres (12,730 ft) high, in the Hughes Range, standing 3 nautical miles (5.6 km; 3.5 mi) northeast of Mount Wexler. Discovered and photographed by Rear Admiral Byrd on the Baselaying Flight of Nov. 18, 1929, and surveyed by A.P. Crary in 1957-58. Named by Crary for Alan Tower Waterman, Director of the National Science Foundation, which directly supported U.S. Antarctic programs during and after the International Geophysical Year period, 1957-58.

=== Mount Valinski ===
84°32′S 177°30′E. A rock peak, 1,640 metres (5,380 ft) high, standing just south of Millington Glacier and 4 nautical miles (7.4 km; 4.6 mi) west of Ramsey Glacier. Named by US-ACAN for J.E. Valinski, United States Navy, radio operator on United States Navy Operation Highjump (1946–47) Flight 8, Feb. 16, 1947, when this feature was photographed from the air.

=== Mount Bronk ===
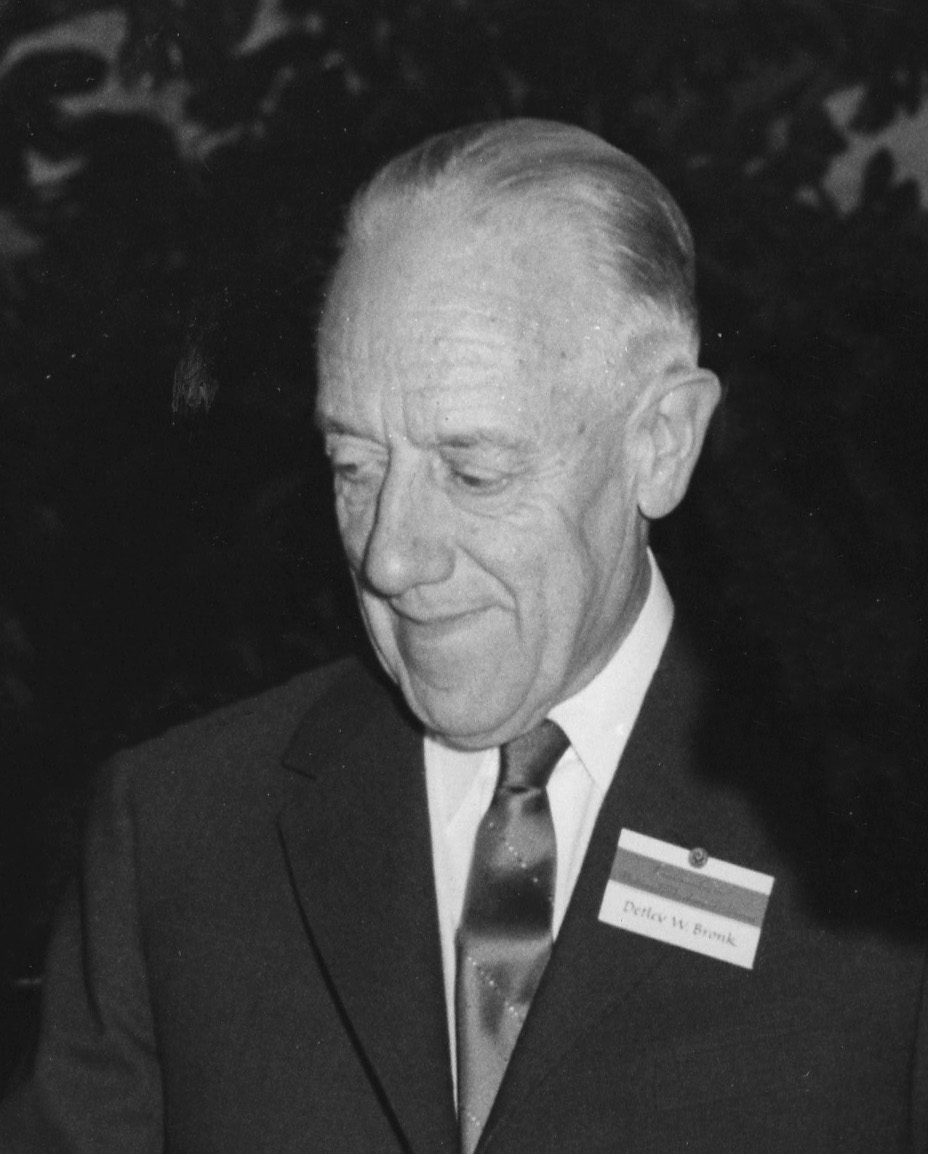
Detlev Wulf Bronk (Mount Bronk)

84°24′S 175°46′E. A snow-covered mountain, 3,530 metres (11,580 ft) high, standing 4 nautical miles (7.4 km; 4.6 mi) northeast of Mount Waterman. Discovered and photographed by Rear Admiral Byrd on the baselaying flight of Nov. 18, 1929, and surveyed by A.P. Crary in 1957-58. Named by Crary for Detlev Bronk, President of the U.S. National Academy of Sciences, which actively supported Antarctic operations during the 1957-58 IGY period.

=== Lane Plateau ===
84.3833333°S 175.4333333°E. A flat, ice-covered plateau that rises to 3,000 metres (9,800 ft) high between Mount Waterman, Mount Cartwright, and Mount Bronk in the central Hughes Range. The plateau trends north–south for 9 nautical miles (17 km; 10 mi) and is 2.5 nautical miles (4.6 km; 2.9 mi) wide. Discovered and photographed by Rear Admiral Byrd on the Baselaying Flight of Nov. 18, 1929, and surveyed by A.P. Crary, 1957-58. Mapped by U.S. Geological Survey (USGS) from surveys, 1962–63, and U.S. Navy photography taken 1958-63. The plateau is named in honor of Neal Lane, Director of the National Science Foundation from 1993 to 1998. Under his leadership NSF won congressional approval for rebuilding South Pole Station as a premier international science facility set to open at the beginning of the 21st century.

=== Mount Cartwright ===
84°21′S 175°08′E. A sharp peak, 3,325 metres (10,909 ft) high, surmounting a north–south trending ridge 7 nautical miles (13 km; 8.1 mi) north-northwest of Mount Waterman. Discovered and photographed by the USAS on Flight C of February 29-March 1, 1940, and surveyed by A.P. Crary in 1957-58. Named by Crary for Gordon Cartwright, first of the U.S. exchange IGY scientists, who wintered at the Soviet Mirnyy Station, 1957.

=== Good Glacier ===
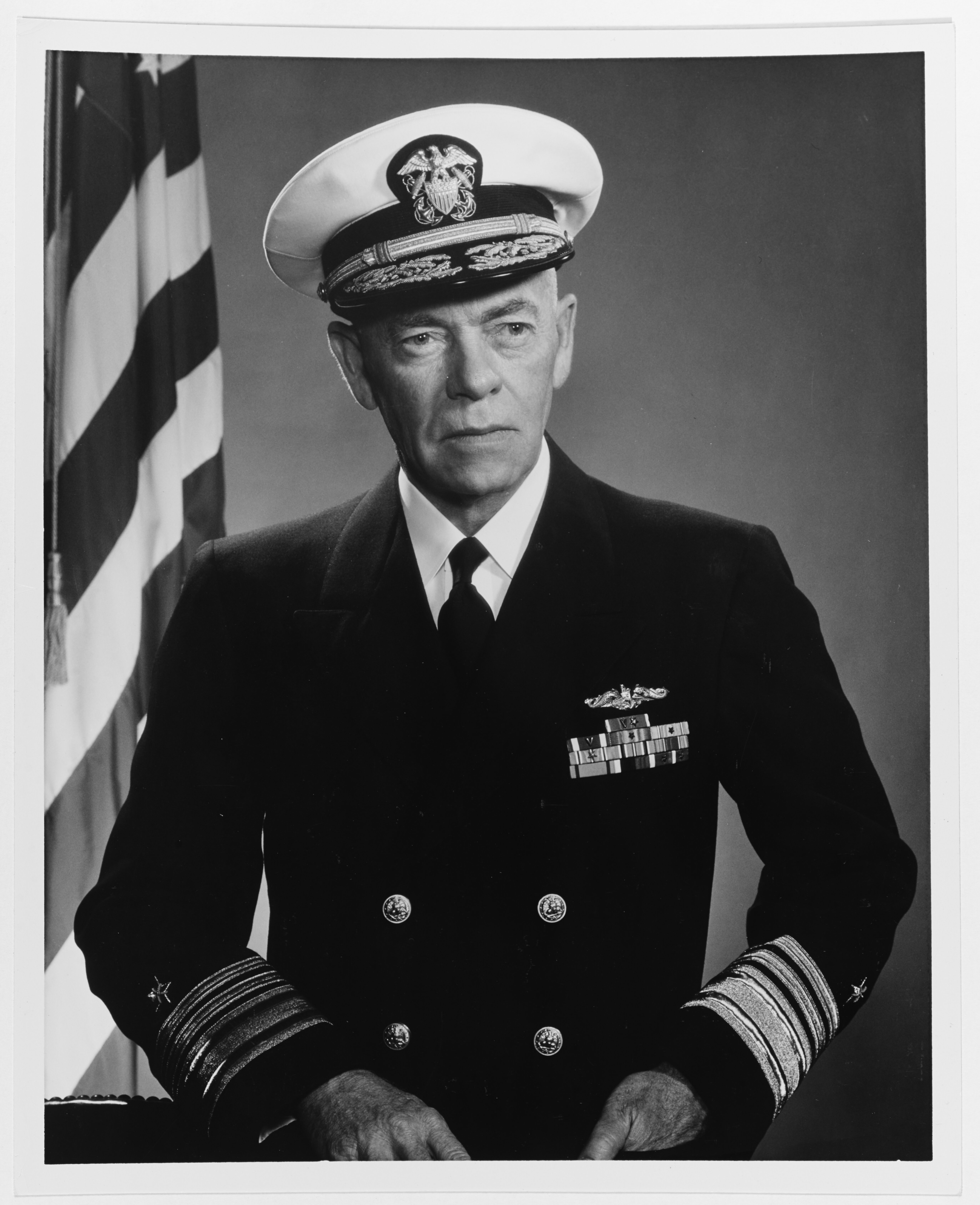
Roscoe F. Good (Good Glacier)

84°12′S 177°50′E. A wide glacier draining the east slopes of Hughes Range between Mount Brennan and Mount Waterman and flowing northeast to enter the Ross Ice Shelf to the east of Mount Reinhardt. Discovered by the United States Antarctic Service (USAS) on Flight C of February 29-March 1, 1940, and named by US-ACAN, on the recommendation of R. Admiral Richard E. Byrd, for Vice Admiral Roscoe F. Good, United States Navy, who furnished assistance and support for United States Navy Operation Highjump (1946–47).

=== Mount Brennan ===
84°15′S 175°54′E. A dome-shaped mountain, 2,540 metres (8,330 ft) high, which is the northernmost prominent summit in the Hughes Range, standing 7 nautical miles (13 km; 8.1 mi) northeast of Mount Cartwright. Discovered and photographed by the USAS on Flight C of February 29-March 1, 1940, and surveyed by A.P. Crary in 1957-58. Named by Crary for Matthew J. Brennan, scientific station leader at Ellsworth Station, 1958.

=== Perez Glacier ===
84°06′S 177°00′E A glacier, 10 nautical miles (19 km; 12 mi) long, flowing northeast from Mount Brennan in the Hughes Range to the Ross Ice Shelf east of Giovinco Ice Piedmont. Named by US-ACAN for Ensign Richard Perez, United States Navy, of Squadron VX-6, Antarctic Support Activity, who participated in United States Navy. OpDFrz 1964; wintered at McMurdo Station in 1961.

=== Mount Reinhardt ===
84°12′S 177°12′E. A mountain 1,020 metres (3,350 ft) high, with a spur descending northeast from it, standing at the NW portal of Good Glacier where the latter flows into Ross Ice Shelf. Discovered by the USAS on Flight C of February 29-March 1, 1940, and named by US-ACAN for Cdr. Charles O. Reinhardt, United States Navy, engineer for United States Navy Operation Highjump (1946–47) and for Little America IV.

=== Den Hartog Peak ===
84°20′S 178°52′E. A small peak at the west side of the mouth of Ramsey Glacier, 3 nautical miles (5.6 km; 3.5 mi) southeast of Woodall Peak. Discovered and photographed by the USAS on Flight C of February 29-March 1, 1940, and surveyed by A.P. Crary in 1957-58. Named by Crary for Stephen Den Hartog, who was glaciologist on the Victoria Land Traverse Party (1958–59), and wintered at Little America V, 1958.

=== Woodall Peak ===
84°17′S 178°38′E. A small rock peak, 720 metres (2,360 ft) high, close to the south edge of the Ross Ice Shelf, about midway between the mouths of Good and Ramsey Glaciers. Discovered and photographed by the USAS on Flight C of February 29-March 1, 1940, and named by US-ACAN for Vance Woodall, Seaman, United States Navy, who lost his life in an unloading accident on United States Navy Operation Highjump, 1946-47.

== Nearby features ==
=== Husky Heights ===
84°53′S 176°00′E Relatively flat, ice-covered heights 4 nautical miles (7.4 km; 4.6 mi) southeast of Haynes Table, overlooking the head of Brandau Glacier. Named by US-ACAN in association with Husky Dome (q.v), the highest point on these heights.

=== Husky Dome ===
84°54′S 176°17′E. A snow dome rising to 3,580 metres (11,750 ft) high, marking the highest point of Husky Heights, between the heads of Brandau Glacier and Ramsey Glacier. Named by New Zealand Geological Survey Antarctic Expedition 1961-62, after their Husky dogs which they drove to the summit of this feature.

== Sources ==
- Alberts, Fred G., ed. (1995), Geographic Names of the Antarctic (PDF) (2 ed.), United States Board on Geographic Names This article incorporates public domain material from websites or documents of the United States Board on Geographic Names.
- "Lane Plateau", Geographic Names Information System, United States Geological Survey, United States Department of the Interior
- The Cloudmaker, USGS
- This article incorporates public domain material from websites or documents of the United States Geological Survey.
