= Keltie Glacier =

Glacier in Antarctica

- Location within Antarctica
- Coordinates: 84°53′S 170°20′E
- Terminus: Beardmore Glacier

The Keltie Glacier (84°53′S 170°20′E) is a large Antarctic glacier, 30 nautical miles (56 km) long, draining from Pain Névé southwest around the southern extremity of the Commonwealth Range, and then northwest to enter Beardmore Glacier at Ranfurly Point. It was discovered by the British Antarctic Expedition, 1907–09, under Ernest Shackleton, who named it for Sir John Scott Keltie, Secretary of the Royal Geographical Society, 1892–1915.

== Course ==
The Keltie Glacier originates in the Pain Névé below Mount Kaplan and Mount Wexler in the Hughes Range of the Queen Maud Mountains. It flows southwest between the Hughes Range and the Commonwealth Range. It is joined from the east by the Brandau Glacier to the north of the Barton Mountains, where it turns west. It then turns northwest past the Supporters Range, from which it is joined by the Snakeskin Glacier and then the Laird Glacier before entering the Beardmore Glacier from the east past Ranfurly Point. The Brandau Glacier is fed by the Leigh Hunt Glacier from the left (south) before joining the Keltie Glacier. The Snakeskin Glacier is fed from the right (east) by the Falkenhof Glacier.

== Tributaries ==
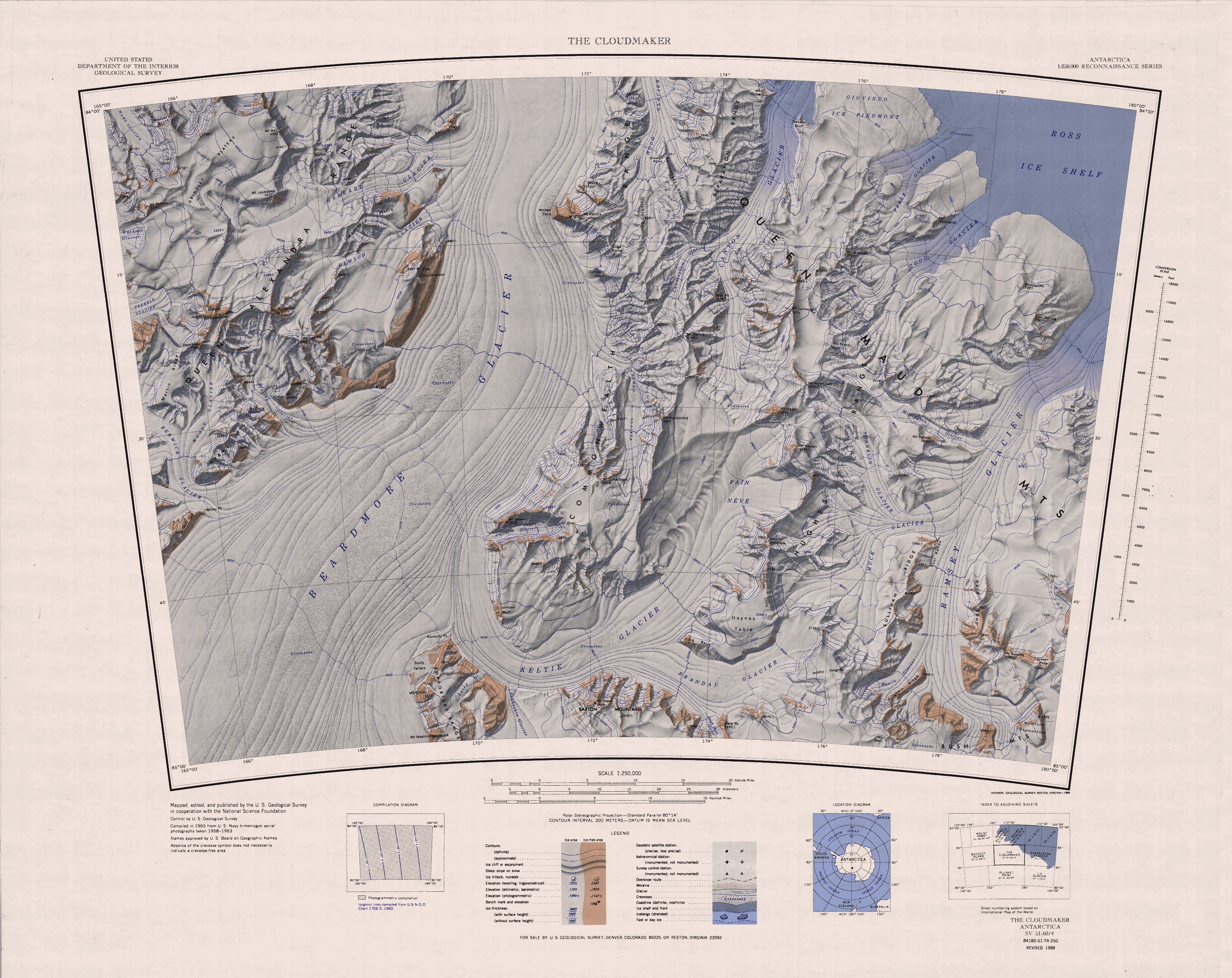
Keltie Glacier (South Center)

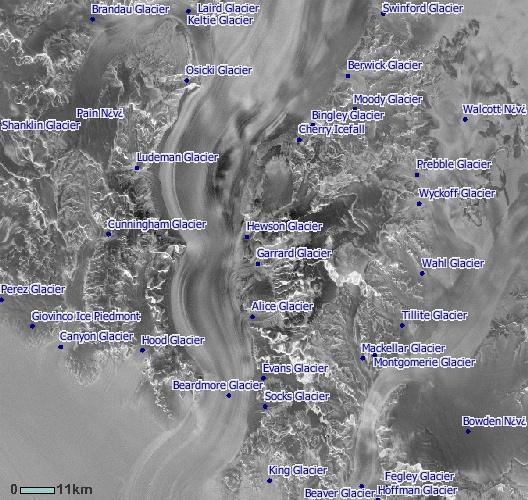
NASA Radarsat Image of Antarctic Glaciers Showing Keltie Glacier

=== Pain Névé ===
84°36′S 174°20′E. A névé between Commonwealth Range and Hughes Range from which the Keltie Glacier drains southwestward to enter Beardmore Glacier. Named by the Southern Party of New Zealand Geological Survey Antarctic Expedition (NZGSAE) (1961–62) for Kevin Pain, field assistant with the party.

=== Brandau Glacier ===
84°54′S 173°30′E. A wide tributary glacier, 15 nautical miles (28 km; 17 mi) long, flowing westward from an ice divide between Haynes Table and Husky Heights to enter Keltie Glacier just west of Ford Spur. Named by the Advisory Committee on Antarctic Names (US-ACAN) for Lt. Cdr. James F. Brandau, USN, pilot with Squadron VX-6, OpDFrz 1964 and 1965.

=== Leigh Hunt Glacier ===
85°00′S 174°10′E. A glacier, 7 nautical miles (13 km; 8.1 mi) long, flowing north-north-west to enter Brandau Glacier just west of Hare Peak. Named by the NZGSAE (1961-62) for A. Leigh Hunt, founder and first chairman of the New Zealand Antarctic Society.

=== Snakeskin Glacier ===
84°57′S 170°40′E. A tributary glacier, 15 nautical miles (28 km; 17 mi) long, flowing northwest to enter Keltie Glacier at the east side of Supporters Range. Named by NZGSAE (1961-62) as being descriptive of the ice and snow patterns observed on the glacier's surface.

=== Jensen Glacier ===
85°05′S 162°48′E. A tributary glacier, about 10 nautical miles (19 km; 12 mi) long, flowing north between Supporters Range and Lhasa Nunatak into Snakeskin Glacier. Named by US-ACAN for Kenard H. Jensen, USARP meteorologist at South Pole Station, 1963.

=== Falkenhof Glacier ===
85°02′S 172°05′E. A tributary glacier 7 nautical miles (13 km; 8.1 mi) long, flowing west from the vicinity of Tricorn Mountain to enter Snakeskin Glacier northwest of Mount Clarke. Named by US-ACAN for Jack J. Falkenhof, USARP meteorologist at South Pole Station, 1963.

=== Laird Glacier ===
84°55′S 169°55′E. A tributary glacier, 3 nautical miles (5.6 km; 3.5 mi) long, flowing northeast from the Supporters Range to enter Keltic Glacier 4 nautical miles (7.4 km; 4.6 mi) southeast of Ranfurly Point. Named by US-ACAN for Robert J. Laird, USARP biologist at McMurdo Station, 1963.

== Sources ==
- Alberts, Fred G., ed. (1995), Geographic Names of the Antarctic (PDF) (2 ed.), United States Board on Geographic Names This article incorporates public domain material from websites or documents of the United States Board on Geographic Names.
- The Cloudmaker, USGS
- Plunket Point (PDF), USGS
- This article incorporates public domain material from websites or documents of the United States Geological Survey.
