= Commonwealth Range =

Mountain range in Antarctica

- Location within Antarctica

Highest point
- Peak: Flat Top (Ross Dependency)
- Elevation: 4,000 m (13,123 ft)
- Coordinates: 84°41′S 171°55′E

Dimensions
- Length: 144 km (89 mi) N-S
- Width: 66 km (41 mi) E-W
- Area: 4,820 km^{2} (1,860 mi^{2})

Geography
- Continent: Antarctica
- Region: Dufek Coast
- Range coordinates: 84°15′S 172°13′E
- Parent range: Queen Maud Mountains

The Commonwealth Range (84°15′S 172°13′E) is a north-south trending range of rugged mountains, 60 nautical miles (110 km; 69 mi) long, located within the Queen Maud Mountains on the Dufek Coast of the continent of Antarctica. The range borders the eastern side of Beardmore Glacier from Keltie Glacier to the Ross Ice Shelf. The range is southeast of the Queen Alexandra Range, which is to the west of the Beardmore Glacier. It is west of the Hughes Range and north of the Supporters Range and the Barton Mountains.

== Discovery and naming ==
The range was discovered by the British Antarctic Expedition, 1907–09 and named by them after the Commonwealth of Australia, which gave much assistance to the expedition.

== Location ==
The Commonwealth Range runs from south to north along the east side of the Beardmore Glacier. Towards its southeast the Pain Névé feeds the Keltie Glacier, which flows southwest, then west, then north round the southern tip of the range to join the Beardmore Glacier. The Canyon Glacier forms just north of the Pain Névé and flows north along the east side of the range. Further north the Hood Glacier defines the east side of the range, which stretches to the Ross Ice Shelf. Features, from north to south, include Johnson Bluff, Flat Top, Mount Deakin, Mount Donaldson, Mount Macdonald to the east of Ludeman Glacier, a tributary of the Beardsmore, Mount Hermanson, Gray Peak, Dudley Head, Siege Dome, Dolphin Spur to the north of Hood Glacier, Mount Patrick, Wedge Face, Beetle Spur and Mount Cyril. Further north are Celebration Pass, Mount Henry, Mount Harcourt and Mount Kyffin.

== Highest peaks ==
Mountains and peaks over 2,500 metres (8,200 ft) high include:

Mountain	m	ft	coord
Flat Top	4,000	13,000	84°42′S 171°50′E
Mount Donaldson	3,930	12,890	84°37′S 172°12′E
Mount Macdonald	3,630	11,910	84°31′S 173°10′E
Mount Hermanson	3,140	10,300	84°23′S 173°32′E
Mount Deakin	2,810	9,220	84°40′S 170°40′E
Gray Peak	2,570	8,430	84°20′S 173°56′E

== Features ==
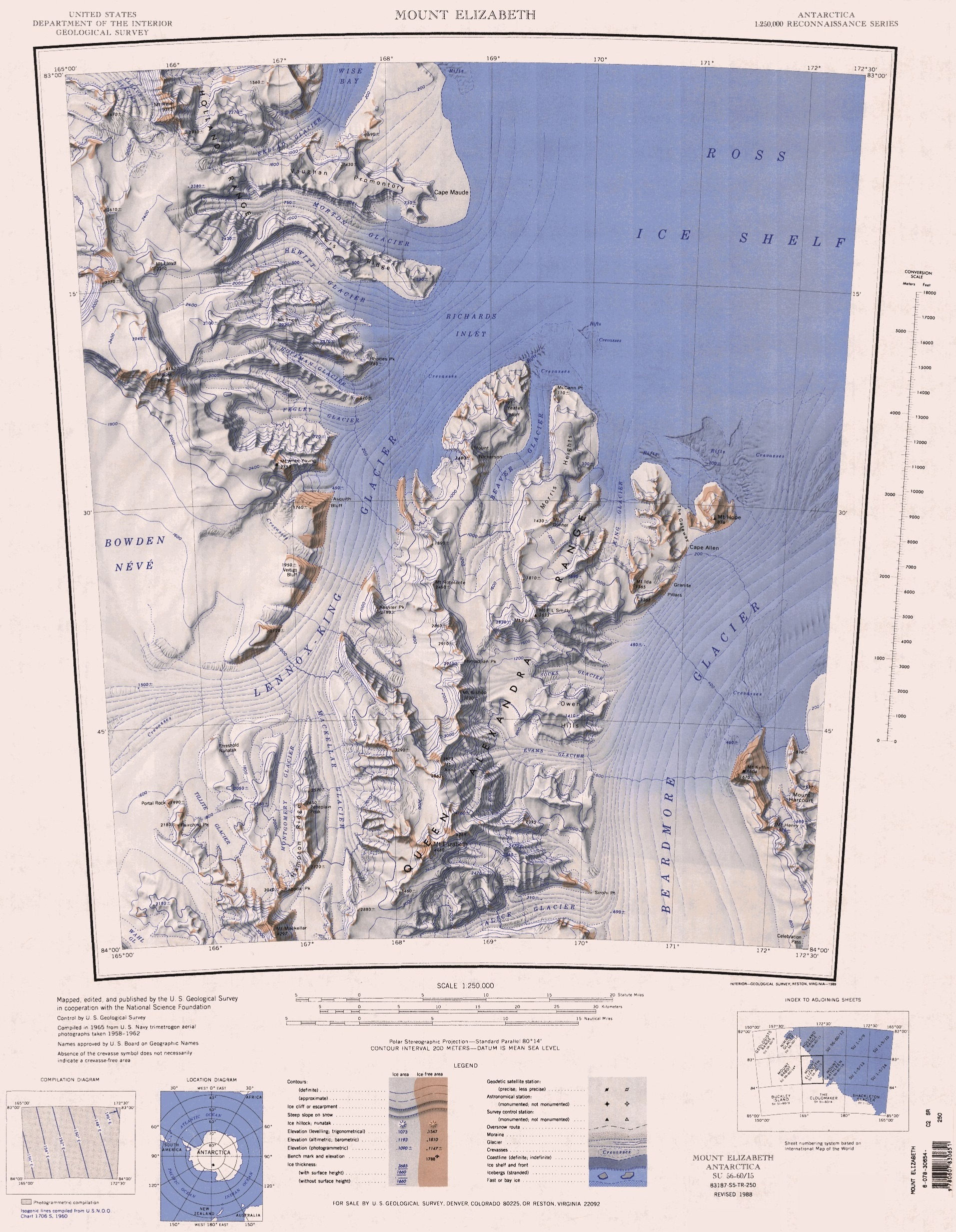
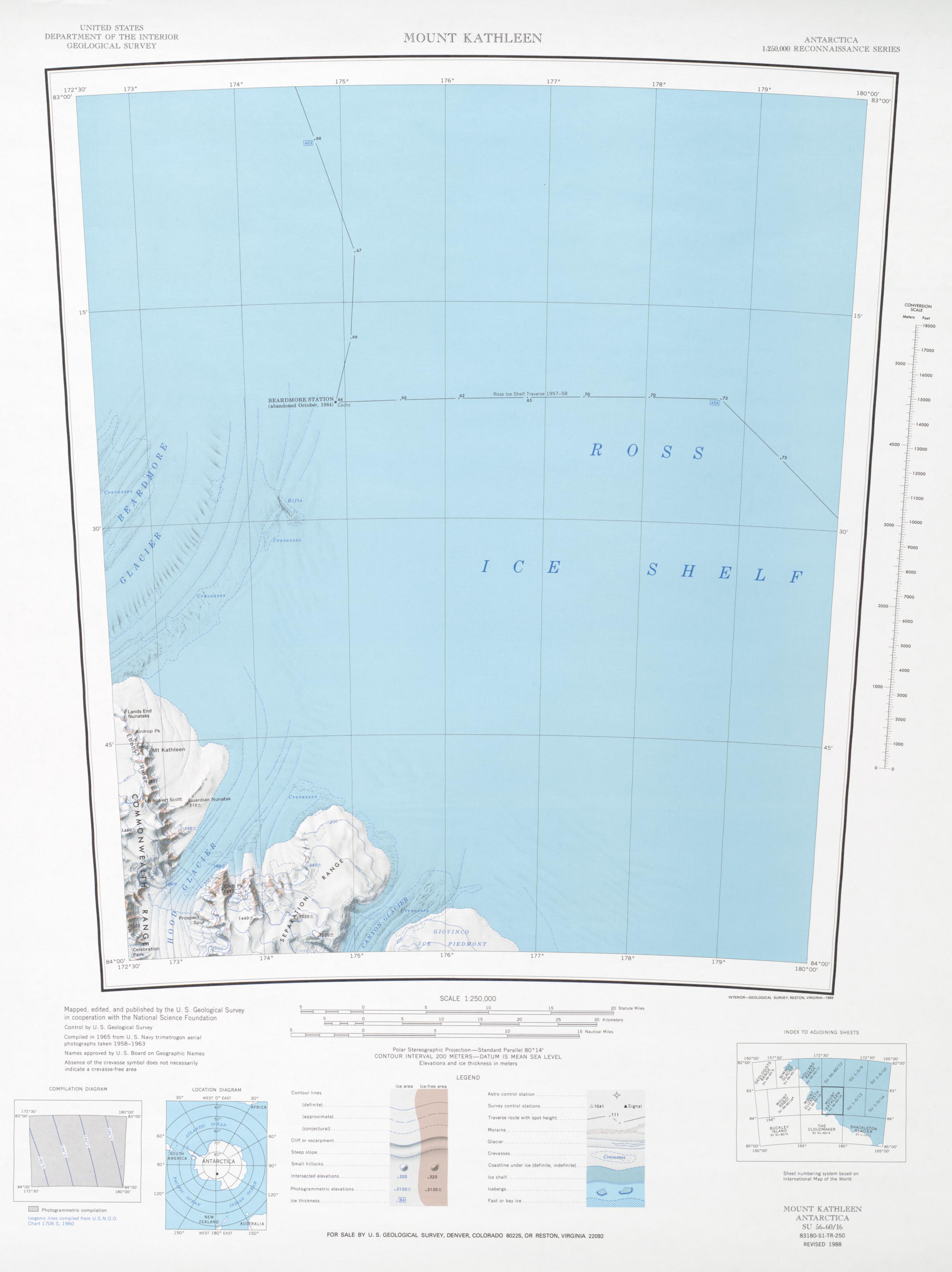
Northwest tip of range in south center of the two maps

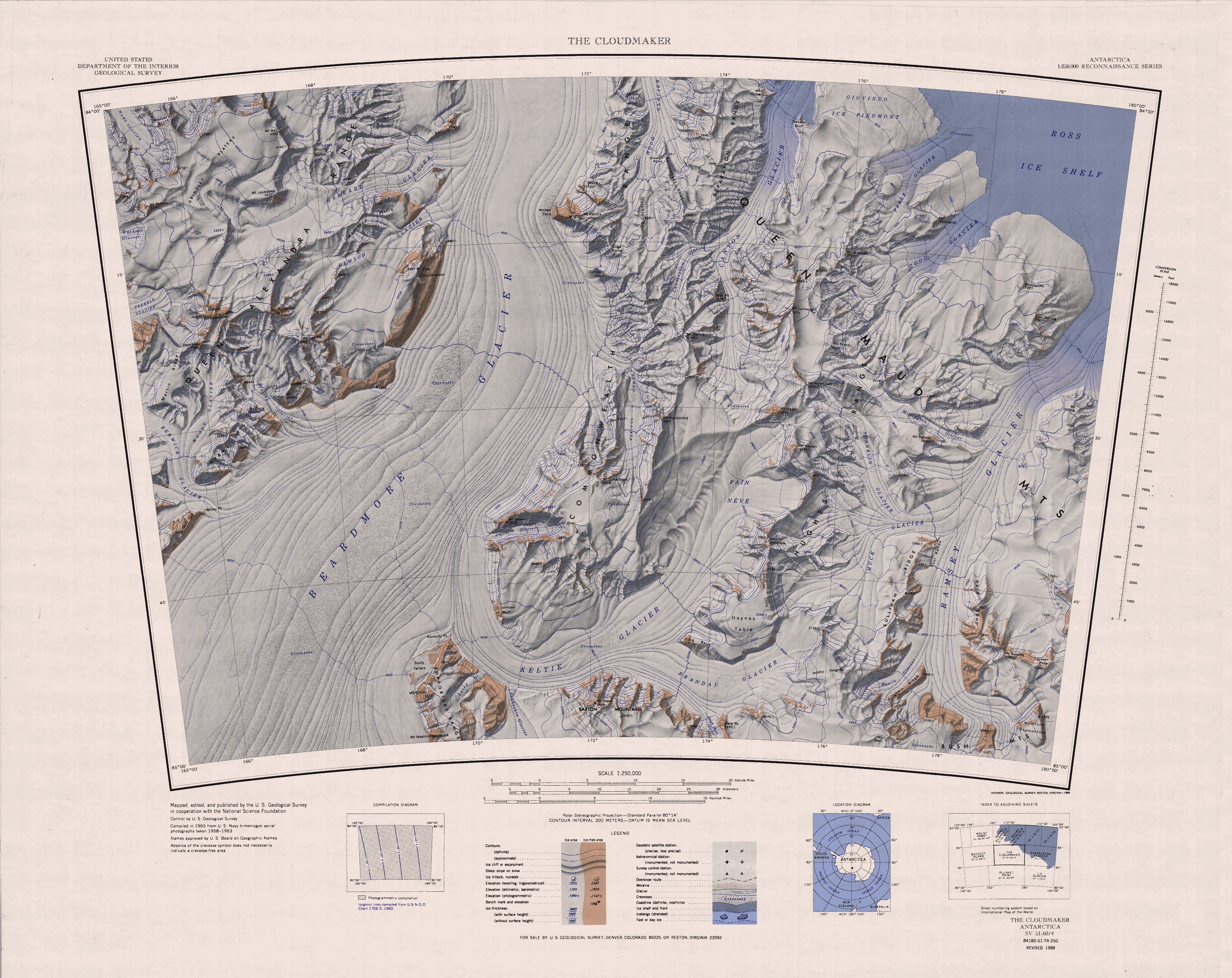
Commonwealth range runs south–north in the center of the map

Features, from south to north, include:

=== Johnson Bluff ===
84°49′S 170°31′E. A conspicuous rock bluff 5 nautical miles (9.3 km; 5.8 mi) east-northeast of Ranfurly Point, overlooking the east side of Keltie Glacier at its confluence with Beardmore Glacier. Named by United States Advisory Committee on Antarctic Names (US-ACAN) for Dwight L. Johnson, USARP biologist at McMurdo Station, 1963.

=== Flat Top ===
84°42′S 171°50′E. A prominent ice-covered mountain, over 4,000 metres (13,000 ft) high, with a broad, flat summit area, standing just east of the head of Osicki Glacier. It is the highest point in the Commonwealth Range. Named by the British Antarctic Expedition, 1910–13, as being descriptive.

=== Mount Deakin ===
84°40′S 170°40′E. A prominent mountain, 2,810 metres (9,220 ft) high, at the east side of Beardmore Glacier, just north of the mouth of Osicki Glacier. Discovered by the British Antarctic Expedition, 1907–09 and named by Shackleton for Sir Alfred Deakin, Prime Minister of Australia, who had supported the expedition.

=== Mount Donaldson ===
84°37′S 172°12′E. A mountain, 3,930 metres (12,890 ft) high, standing 5 nautical miles (9.3 km; 5.8 mi) north-northeast of Flat Top and west of the head of Ludeman Glacier. Discovered and named by the British Antarctic Expedition, 1907–09.

=== Mount Macdonald ===
84°31′S 173°10′E A peak, 3,630 metres (11,910 ft) high, surmounting the massive north–south trending ridge between Ludeman Glacier and Pain Névé. Named by NZGSAE (1961–62) for the Hon. T.L. Macdonald, who was Minister of External Affairs and of Defence when the CTAE (1956–58) was being planned and who took a prominent part in obtaining New Zealand participation in the Antarctic.

=== Mount Hermanson ===
84°23′S 173°32′E. An ice-covered mountain in the Queen Maud Mountains, 3,140 metres (10,300 ft) high, standing at the head of Cunningham Glacier, 4 nautical miles (7.4 km; 4.6 mi) southwest of Gray Peak. Named by US-ACAN for Capt. J.M. Hermanson, USN, air operations officer, McMurdo Station, 1957–58; Chief of Staff to the U.S. Antarctic Projects Officer, 1959.

=== Gray Peak ===
84°20′S 173°56′E. A prominent rock peak, 2,570 metres (8,430 ft) high, standing at the west side of Canyon Glacier, 4 nautical miles (7.4 km; 4.6 mi) northeast of Mount Hermanson. Named by US-ACAN after Thomas I. Gray, Jr., Weather Central meteorologist at Little America V, 1958.

=== Dudley Head ===
84°18′S 172°15′E. A snow-covered, prominent ridge projecting into the east side of Beardmore Glacier, surmounted by several domes rising to 2,540 metres (8,330 ft), about 5 nautical miles (9.3 km; 5.8 mi) south of Mount Patrick. Discovered and named by the British Antarctic Expedition 1907–09, and called "Mount Dudley" by Shackleton. The name was amended by US-ACAN in keeping with the appearance of the feature.

=== Siege Dome ===
84°16′S 172°22′E. A small, ice-covered prominence standing to the south of the head of Hood Glacier, close southeast of Mount Patrick. Named by the New Zealand Alpine Club Antarctic Expedition (1959–60) because while attempting to establish a survey station here, they met with an eight day snow storm.

=== Dolphin Spur ===
84°12′S 172°48′E. A broad ice-covered spur just east of Mount Patrick, descending north into the upper reaches of Hood Glacier. Its several rock outcrops when seen from lower levels of the glacier resemble a school of dolphins diving through the sea. Named by the New Zealand Alpine Club Antarctic Expedition, 1959-60.

=== Mount Patrick ===
84°13′S 172°00′E. A massive largely ice-covered mountain rising to 2,380 metres (7,810 ft) high, just east of Wedge Face on the east side of the Beardmore Glacier. Discovered and named by the British Antarctic Expedition, 1907–09.

=== Wedge Face ===
84°12′S 171°30′E. A descriptive name for the prominent wedge-shaped rock spur that projects from Mount Patrick into the eastern part of Beardmore Glacier. This feature was almost surely observed by Shackleton's Southern Journey Party on its ascent of the Beardmore Glacier in December 1908. It was named by the South Pole Party of the British Antarctic Expedition, 1910–13, under Robert Scott.

=== Beetle Spur ===
84°10′S 172°00′E. A rock spur 2 nautical miles (3.7 km; 2.3 mi) north of Mount Patrick. It descends from a small summit peak on the range to the east side of Beardmore Glacier. Probably first seen by Shackleton's Southern Party in 1908. The name is descriptive of the appearance of the spur when viewed from the west. Name suggested by John Gunner of the Ohio State University Geological Expedition, 1969–70, who collected geological samples at the spur.

=== Mount Cyril ===
84°02′S 172°35′E. An ice-covered mountain, 1,190 metres (3,900 ft) high, standing 2 nautical miles (3.7 km; 2.3 mi) south of Celebration Pass. Discovered and named by the British Antarctic Expedition, 1907-09 under Shackleton. Named for Cyril Longhurst, Secretary of the BrNAE (1901–04), who was best man at Shackleton's wedding.

=== Celebration Pass ===
83°59′S 172°30′E. A low pass through Commonwealth Range just north of Mount Cyril permitting passage between Beardmore Glacier and Hood Glacier. The pass was crossed on Christmas Day, 1959, by the N.Z. Alpine Club Antarctic Expedition (1959–60) and was named by them because of the festivities held to mark the day.

=== Mount Henry ===
83°52′S 172°04′E. A sharp peak, 1,675 metres (5,495 ft) high standing 4 nautical miles (7.4 km; 4.6 mi) southeast of Mount Kyffm on the east side of Beardmore Glacier. Discovered and named by the British Antarctic Expedition, 1907–09.

=== Mount Harcourt ===
83°49′S 172°25′E. A mountain, 1,535 metres (5,036 ft) high, standing 5 nautical miles (9.3 km; 5.8 mi) east of Mount Kyffin at the north end of the Commonwealth Range. Discovered and named by the British Antarctic Expedition, 1907–09.

=== Mount Kyffin ===
83°48′S 171°38′E. A distinctive reddish-brown mountain, 1,670 metres (5,480 ft), with a sloping spur extending 4 nautical miles (7.4 km; 4.6 mi) to the north, at the extreme north end of the Commonwealth Range, projecting into the east side of Beardmore Glacier and rising precipitously above it. Discovered by the British Antarctic Expedition, 1907–09 and named for Evan Kyffin-Thomas, one of the proprietors of the Register, an Adelaide, South Australian newspaper. He was a traveling companion of Shackleton's on the voyage from England.

=== Mount Robert Scott ===
83°49′S 172°48′E. A small, flat, snow-covered mountain that rises over 1,000 metres (3,300 ft) and is situated immediately south of Ebony Ridge. Discovered by the British Antarctic Expedition, 1907–09 under Ernest Shackleton, who named this feature for Capt. Robert F. Scott, RN. Shackleton had been a member of Scott's Southern Polar Party which reached 82|17'S on the British National Antarctic Expedition 1901–04).

=== Ebony Ridge ===
83°46′S 172°46′E. A coastal ridge 5 nautical miles (9.3 km; 5.8 mi) long between Airdrop Peak and Mount Robert Scott at the north end of the Commonwealth Range. It consists of dark metamorphosed greywacke contrasting sharply with the predominate brown ochre of the weathered surface of the granitic intrusions forming nearby Mounts Kyffin and Harcourt. Descriptively named by the New Zealand Alpine Club Antarctic Expedition, 1959-60.

=== Mount Kathleen ===
83°46′S 172°48′E. A peak about 900 metres (3,000 ft) high, being the central and highest summit of Ebony Ridge at the north end of Commonwealth Range. Discovered by the British Antarctic Expedition, 1907–09 under Sir Ernest Shackleton, who named this feature for his eldest sister.

=== Airdrop Peak ===
83°45′S 172°45′E. A twin-peaked mountain, 890 metres (2,920 ft) high at the north end of Commonwealth Range. It is the first prominent feature in Ebony Ridge when approached from the northwest. When New Zealand surveyors were making observations from the higher of the two peaks on Dec. 11, 1959, an R4D aircraft of United States Navy Squadron VX-6 flew overhead to drop a spare radio to the expedition whose original one had broken down. So named because of this incident by the N.Z. Alpine Club Antarctic Expedition, 1959-60.

== Sources ==
- Alberts, Fred G., ed. (1995), Geographic Names of the Antarctic (PDF) (2 ed.), United States Board on Geographic Names This article incorporates public domain material from websites or documents of the United States Board on Geographic Names.
- The Cloudmaker, USGS
- Mount Elizabeth, USGS
- This article incorporates public domain material from websites or documents of the United States Geological Survey.
