= Dufek Coast =

Coast in Antarctica

Coordinates: 84°30′S 179°0′W

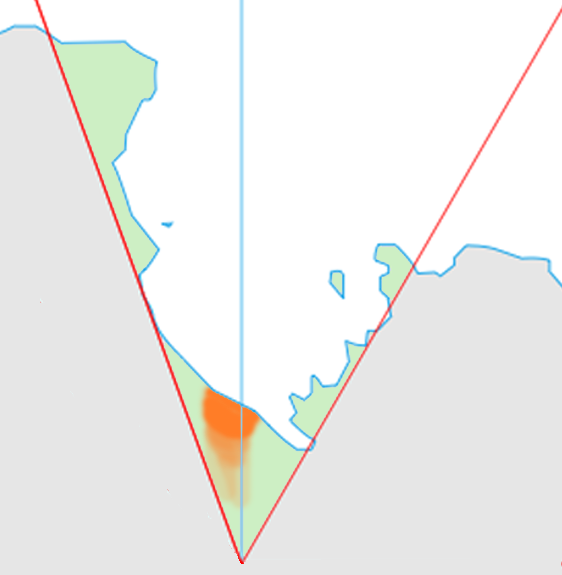
Location of the Dufek Coast (marked in orange) within the Ross Dependency

The Dufek Coast is a portion of the coast along the southwest margin of the Ross Ice Shelf between Airdrop Peak on the east side of the Beardmore Glacier and Morris Peak on the east side of Liv Glacier. It was named by the New Zealand Antarctic Place-Names Committee in 1961 after Rear Admiral George J. Dufek, United States Navy, who served under Rear Admiral Richard E. Byrd with the United States Antarctic Service, 1939–41, and as commander of the Eastern Task Force of U.S. Navy Operation Highjump, 1946–47. He was Commander of U.S. Naval Support Force Antarctica, 1954–59, a period in which the following American science stations were established: McMurdo Station, Little America V, Byrd Station, South Pole Station, Wilkes Station, Hallett Station and Ellsworth Station. United States Navy ships, aircraft, and personnel under his command provided broad logistical support to research and survey operations, including aerial photographic missions to virtually all sectors of Antarctica. On October 31, 1956, Dufek in the ski-equipped R4D Skytrain aircraft Que Sera Sera (pilot Lieutenant Commander Conrad Shinn), flew from McMurdo Sound via Beardmore Glacier to make the first airplane landing at the South Pole.

Dufek Head, Dufek Massif, and Dufek Mountain are also named for Dufek.
