= Clark Mountain =

Clark Mountain may refer to:

- Clark Mountain (California), a peak in California, USA
- Clark Mountain (Maine), a peak in Androscoggin County, Maine, USA
- Clark Mountain (Washington), a peak in the Cascade Range, Washington, USA

== See also ==
- Clark's Mountain, a peak in Clatsop County, Oregon, USA
