= Separation Range =

Mountain range in Antarctica

- Location within Antarctica

Geography
- Continent: Antarctica
- Range coordinates: 84°5′S 174°0′E
- Parent range: Queen Maud Mountains

Separation Range (84°5′S 174°0′E) is the northeastern branch of the Commonwealth Range in the Queen Maud Mountains, Antarctica. The branch starts at about 84°20'S, and forms two chains of mountains separated by Hood Glacier. The Separation Range, about 30 nautical miles (56 km; 35 mi) long, terminates to the north at the Ross Ice Shelf. Named by the New Zealand Alpine Club Antarctic Expedition, 1959–60.

== Location ==
The Separation range lies to the east of the northern part of the Commonwealth Range, and runs from south to north between that range and the Canyon Glacier to the east. The Cunningham Glacier enters the Canyon Glacier just south of the southern end of the Separation Range. The northern end adjoins the Ross Ice Shelf. The Hood Glacier defines its western edge. Features include Retrospect Spur, terminating in the Chevron Rocks, and Mount Cope.

== Features ==
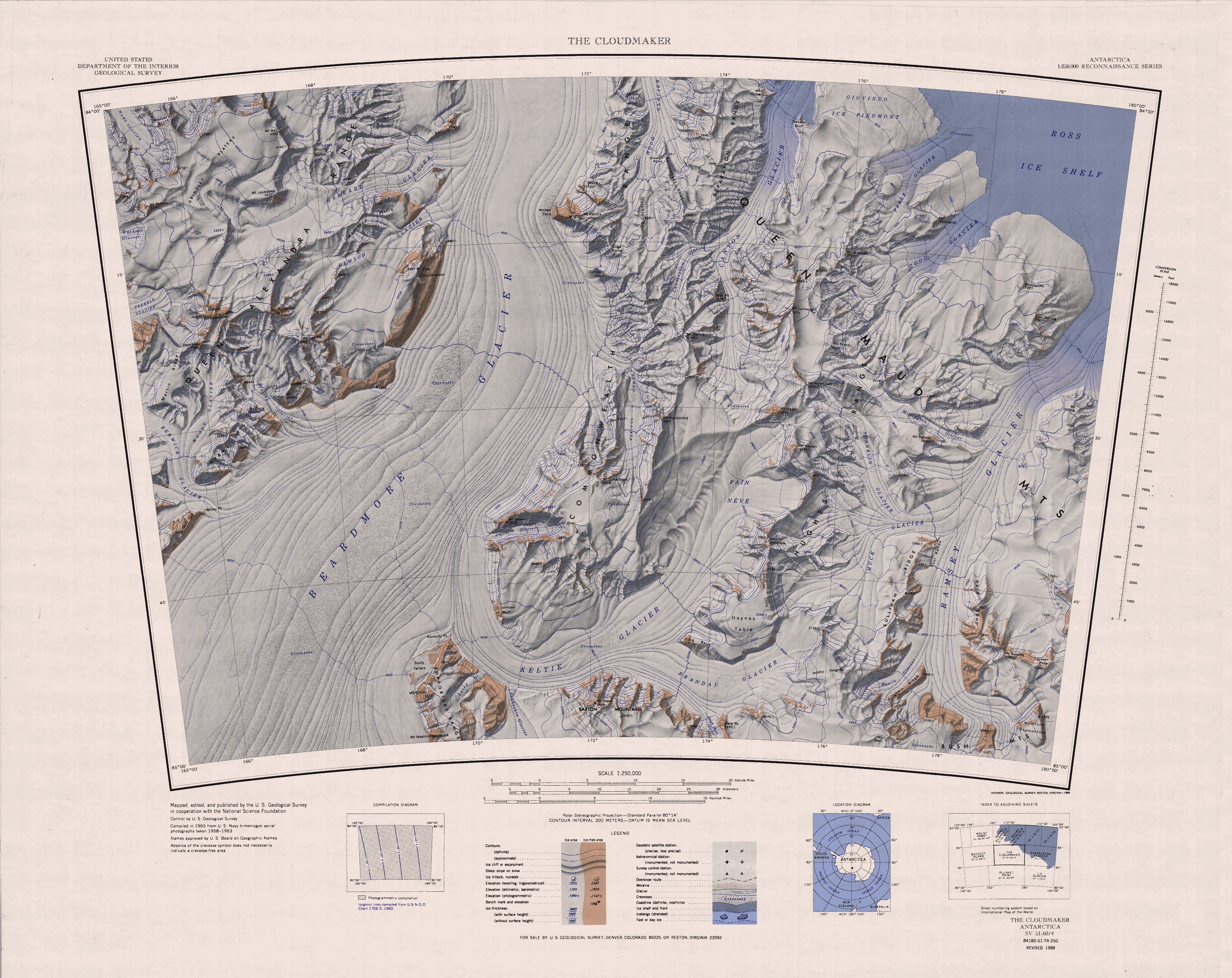
Separation range runs south–north in the north center of the map

Features, from south to north, include:

=== Retrospect Spur ===
84°09′S 173°12′E. A spur, 7 nautical miles (13 km; 8.1 mi) long, descending north-northwest from the base of Separation Range into the east side of Hood Glacier. So named by the New Zealand Alpine Club Antarctic Expedition (1959–60) because they climbed the spur to obtain a panorama of Hood Glacier, which they had just traversed.

=== Chevron Rocks ===
84°07′S 173°10′E. A distinctive rock outcrop at the north end of Retrospect Spur, near the head of Hood Glacier. A New Zealand party climbed Retrospect Spur during the 1959–60 season. They gave the name Chevron Rocks because of their appearance, resembling the stripes worn by non-commissioned officers.

=== Mount Cope ===
84°01′S 174°33′E. A bluff-type mountain on the east side of Separation Range. It overlooks the west side of Canyon Glacier 4 nautical miles (7.4 km; 4.6 mi) northwest of Nadeau Bluff. Mapped by USGS from surveys and U.S. Navy aerial photographs, 1958-63. Named by US-ACAN for Lt. Ronald P. Cope, USN, Officer-in-Charge of the nuclear power plant at McMurdo Station, 1963.

=== Prospect Spur ===
83°57′S 173°25′E. A narrow spur at the southwest base of Cleft Peak. The spur descends westward to the edge of Hood Glacier. So named because it was ascended to obtain a view up Hood Glacier in order to prospect a route to the south. Named by the New Zealand Alpine Club Antarctic Expedition, 1959-60.

=== Cleft Peak ===
83°55′S 173°34′E. A prominent coastal peak, 1,245 metres (4,085 ft) high, whose eastern side is cleft from summit to base by a huge fissure. The feature rises from the west part of the Separation Range and overlooks the terminus of Hood Glacier. Named by the New Zealand Alpine Club Antarctic Expedition (1959–60) whose four members were landed in the vicinity by aircraft of U.S. Navy Squadron VX-6.

== Sources ==
- Alberts, Fred G., ed. (1995), Geographic Names of the Antarctic (PDF) (2 ed.), United States Board on Geographic Names This article incorporates public domain material from websites or documents of the United States Board on Geographic Names.
- The Cloudmaker, USGS
- This article incorporates public domain material from websites or documents of the United States Geological Survey.
