= Canyon Glacier =

Glacier in Antarctica

- Location within Antarctica
- Coordinates: 83°57′S 175°25′E
- Terminus: Ross Ice Shelf

Canyon Glacier (83°57′S 175°25′E) is a narrow glacier, 35 nautical miles (65 km; 40 mi) long, flowing to the Ross Ice Shelf. It drains the northwest slopes of Mount Wexler and moves northward between steep canyon walls of the Separation Range and Hughes Range to join the ice shelf immediately west of Giovinco Ice Piedmont. The glacier was observed from nearby Mount Patrick by the New Zealand Alpine Club Antarctic Expedition (1959–60) who gave the descriptive name.

== Location ==
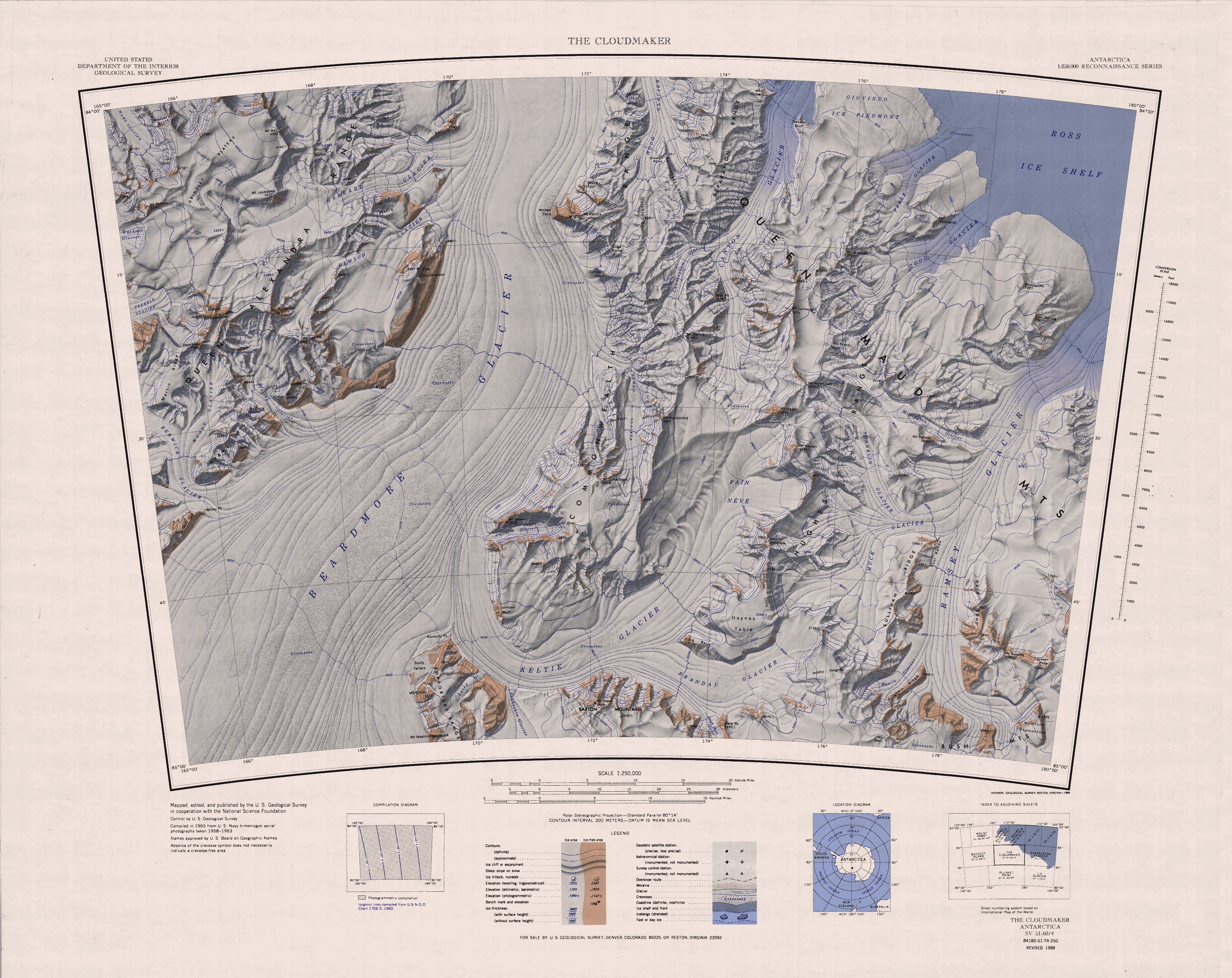
Canyon Glacier in center north of map

The Canyon Glacier rises to the north of the Pain Névé, below Mount Wexler in the Hughes Range to the east. The Commonwealth Range is to the west, including Mount Hermanson and Gray Peak, which overlook the upper reaches. The Canyon Glacier flows north and is joined by the Cunningham Glacier from the left (west). It continues north past the Separation Range along its west side. At its mouth it passes the Nadeau Bluff and the Giovinco Ice Piedmont to the east and Mount Cope to its west.

== Features ==
=== Cunningham Glacier ===
84°16′S 173°45′E. A tributary glacier flowing northeast to enter Canyon Glacier 5 nautical miles (9.3 km; 5.8 mi) north of Gray Peak. Named by the United States Advisory Committee on Antarctic Names (US-ACAN) for Willard E. Cunningham, Jr., cook at McMurdo Station, winter 1960; at South Pole Station, winter 1963.

=== Nadeau Bluff ===
84°04′S 175°09′E. A mainly ice-covered bluff just southwest of Giovinco Ice Piedmont, protruding into Canyon Glacier from that glacier's east side. Named by US-ACAN for F. A. Nadeau, Jr., a member of the support party at McMurdo Station, 1963.

== Sources ==
- Alberts, Fred G., ed. (1995), Geographic Names of the Antarctic (PDF) (2 ed.), United States Board on Geographic Names This article incorporates public domain material from websites or documents of the United States Board on Geographic Names.
- The Cloudmaker, USGS
- This article incorporates public domain material from websites or documents of the United States Geological Survey.
