= Barton Mountains =

Group of mountains in Antarctica

- Location within Antarctica

Geography
- Continent: Antarctica
- Region: Ross Dependency
- Range coordinates: 85°2′S 173°0′E
- Parent range: Queen Maud Mountains

The Barton Mountains (85°2′S 173°0′E) are a group of mountains located south of the Commonwealth Range and the Hughes Range and bounded by Keltie Glacier, Brandau Glacier, Leigh Hunt Glacier, and Snakeskin Glacier, in the Queen Maud Mountains.

== Exploration and naming ==
The Barton Mountains were mapped by the United States Geological Survey (USGS) from surveys and from United States Navy aerial photographs, 1958–63. They were named by the Advisory Committee on Antarctic Names (US-ACAN) after Lieutenant Commander Walter H. Barton, U.S. Navy, officer in charge of the Squadron VXE-6 detachment at Beardmore South Camp in the 1985–86 field season. Lieutenant Commander Barton developed, coordinated, and executed the logistical plan for this large and remote camp, which was in operation for 78 days and required over 800 flight hours in support of research in the Beardmore Glacier area.

== Location ==
The Barton Mountains lie to the south of the point where the Brandau Glacier enters the Keltie Glacier from the southwest. They are separated from the Supporters Range to the west by the Snakeskin Glacier. Northern features include Mount Usher, and Hare Peak to the east across Leigh Hunt Glacier. Features of the south of range include Mount Clarke, Graphite Peak and Tricorn Mountain. Falkenhof Glacier forms in the Barton Mountains and runs west into Snakeskin Glacier, which defines the west side of the range. The Lhasa Nunatak is a long ridge running north-south to the west of Snakeskin Glacier.

== Features ==
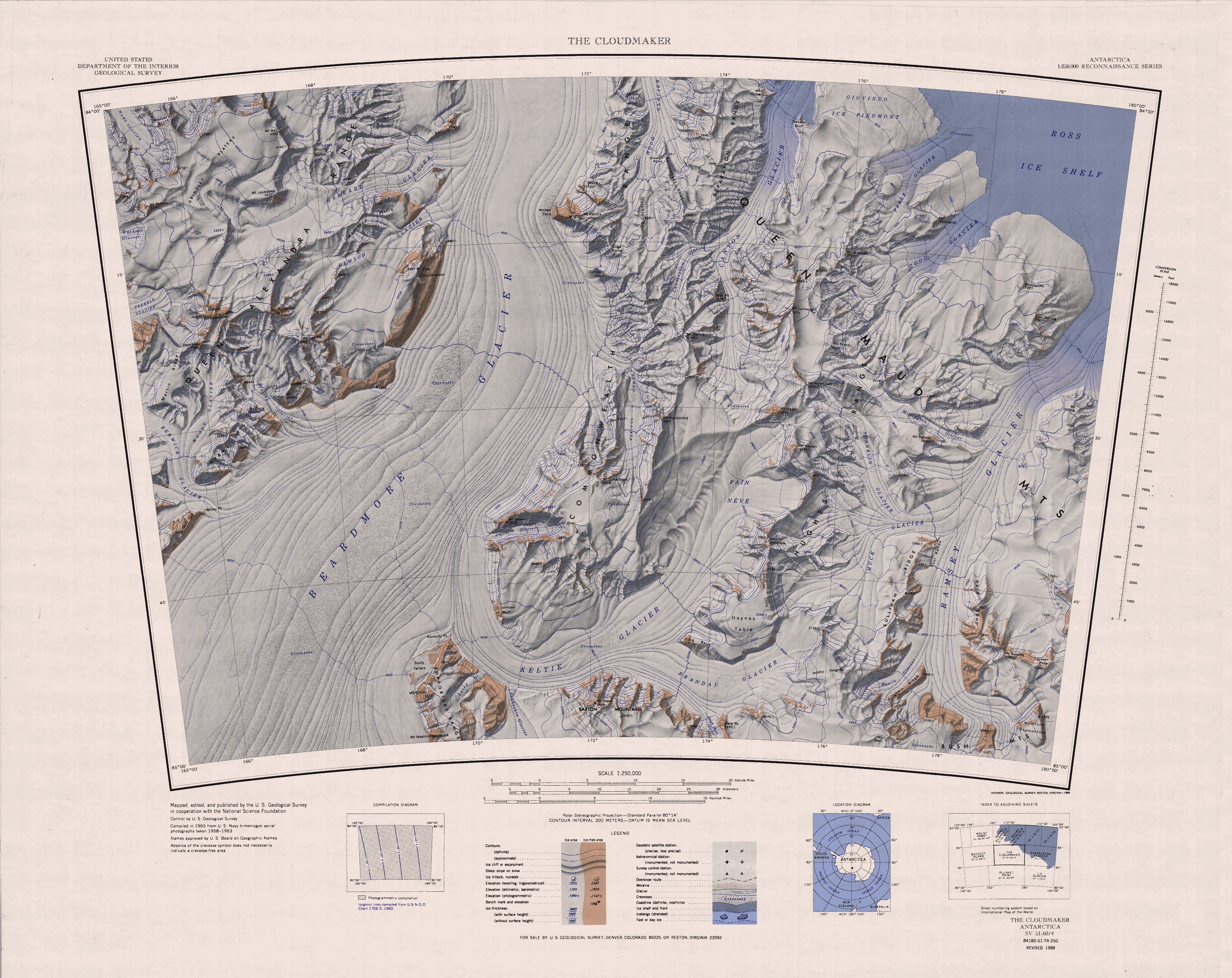
Northern Barton Mountains lower center

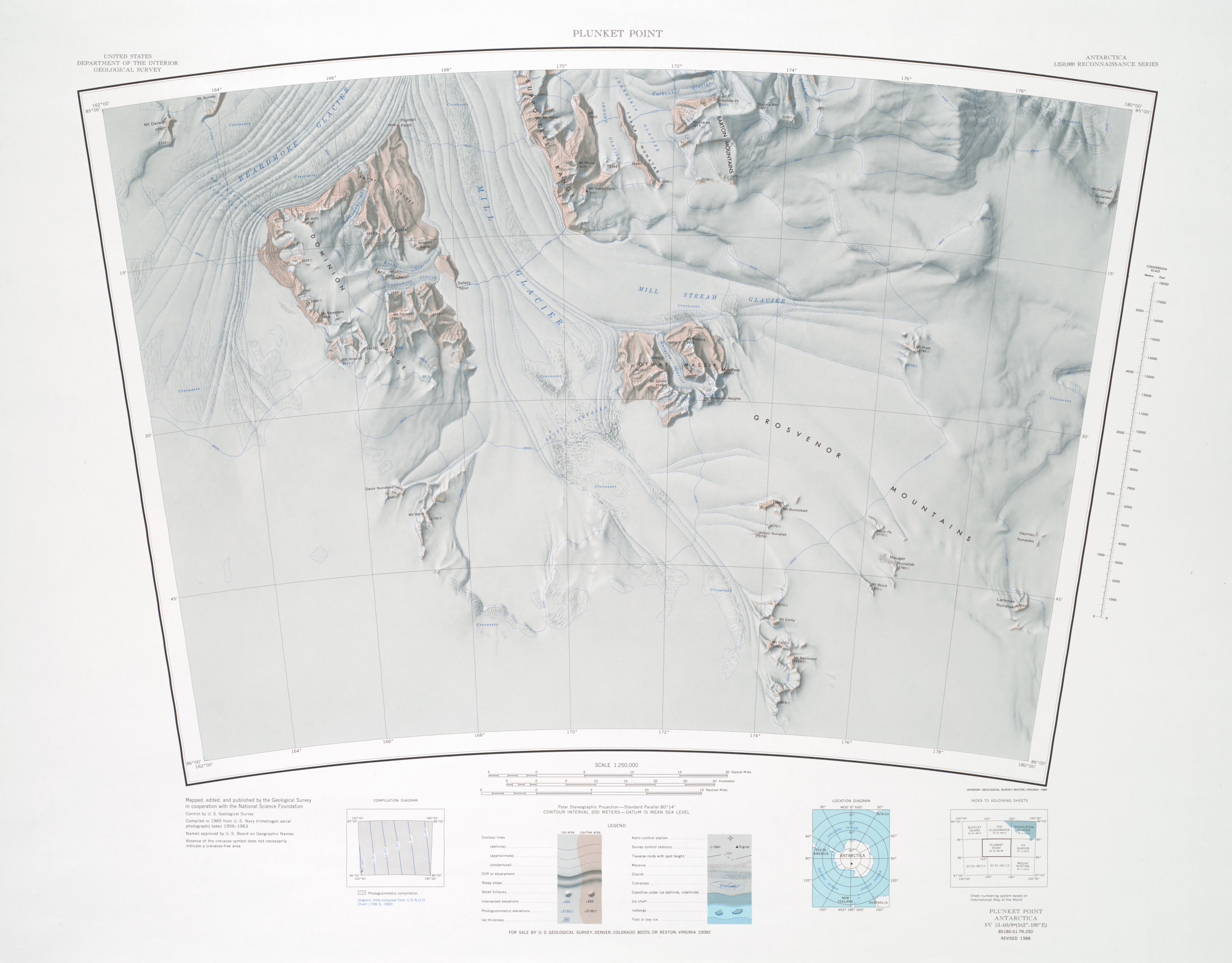
Southern Barton Mountains upper center

=== Mount Usher ===
84°57′S 172°04′E. A distinctive mountain overlooking the south side of Keltic Glacier about 4 nautical miles (7.4 km; 4.6 mi) southwest of the mouth of Brandau Glacier. Discovered and named by the British Antarctic Expedition (1907-09). Identification of this feature varied on subsequent maps. The present description follows the H.E. Saunders map of 1961 which has now been generally accepted.

=== Hare Peak ===
84°59′S 174°17′E. An ice-free peak, 2,970 metres (9,740 ft) high, at the north end of the ridge forming the east side of Leigh Hunt Glacier. Named by the New Zealand Geological Survey Antarctic Expedition (NZGSAE) (1961-62) for C.H. Hare, a member of the British National Antarctic Expedition (1901-04).

=== Mount Clarke ===
85°05′S 172°18′E. A mountain, 3,210 metres (10,530 ft) high, located 13 nautical miles (24 km; 15 mi) due east of Mount Iveagh. The feature rises along the east margin of the Snakeskin Glacier, near the edge of the interior ice plateau. Discovered and named by the Southern Journey Party of the British Antarctic Expedition (1907-09) under Ernest Shackleton.

=== Graphite Peak ===
85°03′S 172°45′E. A peak, 3,260 metres (10,700 ft) high, standing at the northeast end of a ridge running 3 nautical miles (5.6 km; 3.5 mi) northeast from Mount Clarke, just south of the head of Falkenhof Glacier. So named by the NZGSAE (1961-62) because of the graphite found on the peak.

=== Tricorn Mountain ===
85°03′S 173°27′E. A mountain, 3,475 metres (11,401 ft) high, standing 4 nautical miles (7.4 km; 4.6 mi) east of Graphite Peak, about midway between the heads of Falkenhof and Leigh Hunt Glaciers. Named by the NZGSAE (1961-62) because of its resemblance to an admiral's tricorn hat.

=== Lhasa Nunatak ===
85°07′S 171°18′E. Narrow rock ridge, 9 nautical miles (17 km; 10 mi) long, trending in a northwest–southeast direction between Snakeskin Glacier and Jensen Glacier, to the east of Supporters Range. So named by the NZGSAE (1961-62) because the central peak resembles a Tibetan monastery perched on top of a hill.

== Sources ==
- Alberts, Fred G., ed. (1995), Geographic Names of the Antarctic (PDF) (2 ed.), United States Board on Geographic Names This article incorporates public domain material from websites or documents of the United States Board on Geographic Names.
- The Cloudmaker, USGS
- Plunket Point (PDF), USGS
- This article incorporates public domain material from websites or documents of the United States Geological Survey.
