= Giovinco Ice Piedmont =

Giovinco Ice Piedmont (84°1′S 176°10′E) is an ice piedmont, 10 nautical miles (19 km) wide, between Canyon Glacier and Perez Glacier, gradually descending north to the Ross Ice Shelf, Antarctica. It was named by the Advisory Committee on Antarctic Names for Frank A. Giovinco, Master of the USNS Private John R. Towle during U.S. Navy Operation Deep Freeze 1965. Frank Giovinco's nephew is the fine art photographer and artist Steve Giovinco, whose work is loosely related to environmental changes.
