= Clark Mountain (Maine) =

Mountain in Maine, United States

Coordinates: 44°13′10″N 70°10′39″W

- Location within Maine

Highest point
- Elevation: 682 ft (208 m)

Naming
- Etymology: Named for Ephraim Clark

Geography
- Location: Androscoggin County, Maine, U.S.

Clark Mountain is a summit in Androscoggin County, Maine, in the United States. With an elevation of 682 feet (208 m), Clark Mountain is the 1434th highest summit in the state of Maine.

Clark Mountain was named for Ephraim Clark, a pioneer who settled near its base.
