= Clark Peak =

Clark Peak may refer to:

- Clark Peak (Alaska) in Alaska, USA
- Clark Peak (Antarctica)
- Clark Peak (Arizona) in Arizona, USA
- Clark Peak (British Columbia) in British Columbia, Canada
- Clark Peak (California) in California, USA
- Clark Peak (Elk Mountains) in the Elk Mountains, Colorado, USA
- Clark Peak (Medicine Bow Mountains) highest summit of the Medicine Bow Mountains, Colorado, USA
- Clark Peak (New Mexico) in New Mexico, USA
- Clark Peak (Washington) in Washington, USA
- Clark Peak near Nelson, New Zealand
