= Hood Glacier =

Glacier in Antarctica

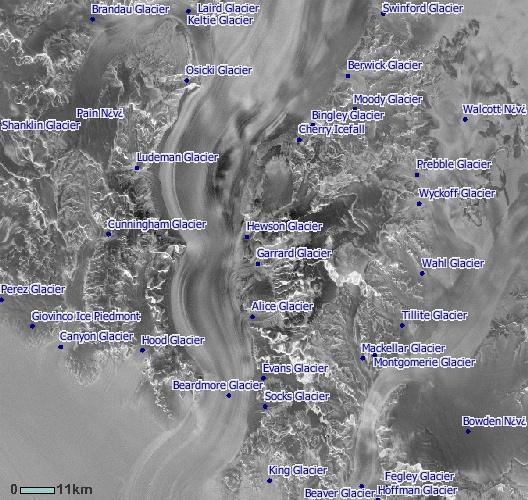
NASA Radarsat Image of Antarctic Glaciers Showing Hood Glacier

Hood Glacier (83°55′S 173°10′E) is a glacier about 25 nautical miles (46 km) long draining northward from Siege Dome in the Commonwealth Range of Antarctica. It enters the Ross Ice Shelf between the Commonwealth Range and the Separation Range. The glacier was discovered by the Southern Polar Party of the 1907–1909 British Antarctic Expedition, under Ernest Shackleton, and was named for Admiral Sir Horace Hood, under whom Jameson Adams, a member of the party, had served in HMS Berwick.

The outcropping known as the Chevron Rocks is located near the head of Hood Glacier.
