= Supporters Range =

Mountain range in Antarctica

- Location within Antarctica

Geography
- Continent: Antarctica
- Region: Ross Dependency
- Range coordinates: 85°04′S 169°30′E
- Parent range: Queen Maud Mountains

The Supporters Range (85°04′S 169°30′E) is a rugged range in the Queen Maud Mountains of Antarctica. It is 25 nautical miles (46 km; 29 mi) long, bordering the eastern side of Mill Glacier, from Keltie Glacier in the north to Mill Stream Glacier in the south. So named by the New Zealand Geological Survey Antarctic Expedition (NZGSAE) (1961–62) because several peaks of the range are named after supporters of Ernest Shackleton's British Antarctic Expedition (1907–09).

== Location ==
The northern point of the range lies between Keltie Glacier, flowing from the east, and Mill Glacier flowing from the south and converging with Beardmore Glacier. Ranfurly Point is its northernmost point. Laird Glacier flows from the range in Keltie Glacier, and Snakeskin Glacier flows along the northeast side of the range into Keltie Glacier. Other features in the north include Scully Terrace, Mount Kinsey and Mount Westminster. Features further south include Mount Iveagh, Mount Judd, Mount White and Mount Henry Lucy. The Jensen Glacier flows along the southeast of the range, separated from the Snakeskin Glacier by the Lhasa Nunatak.

== Features ==
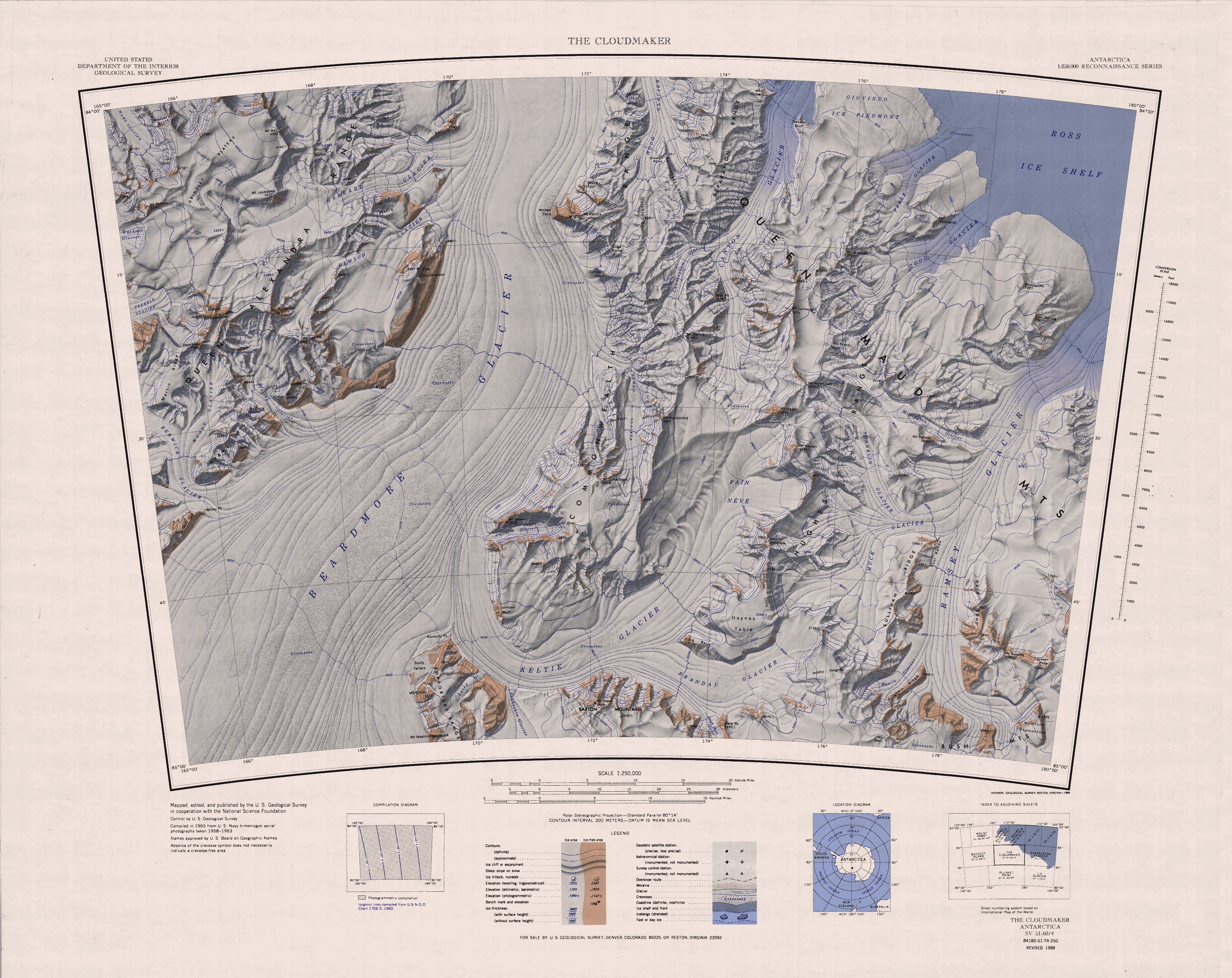
North end of Supporters Range in southwest of map

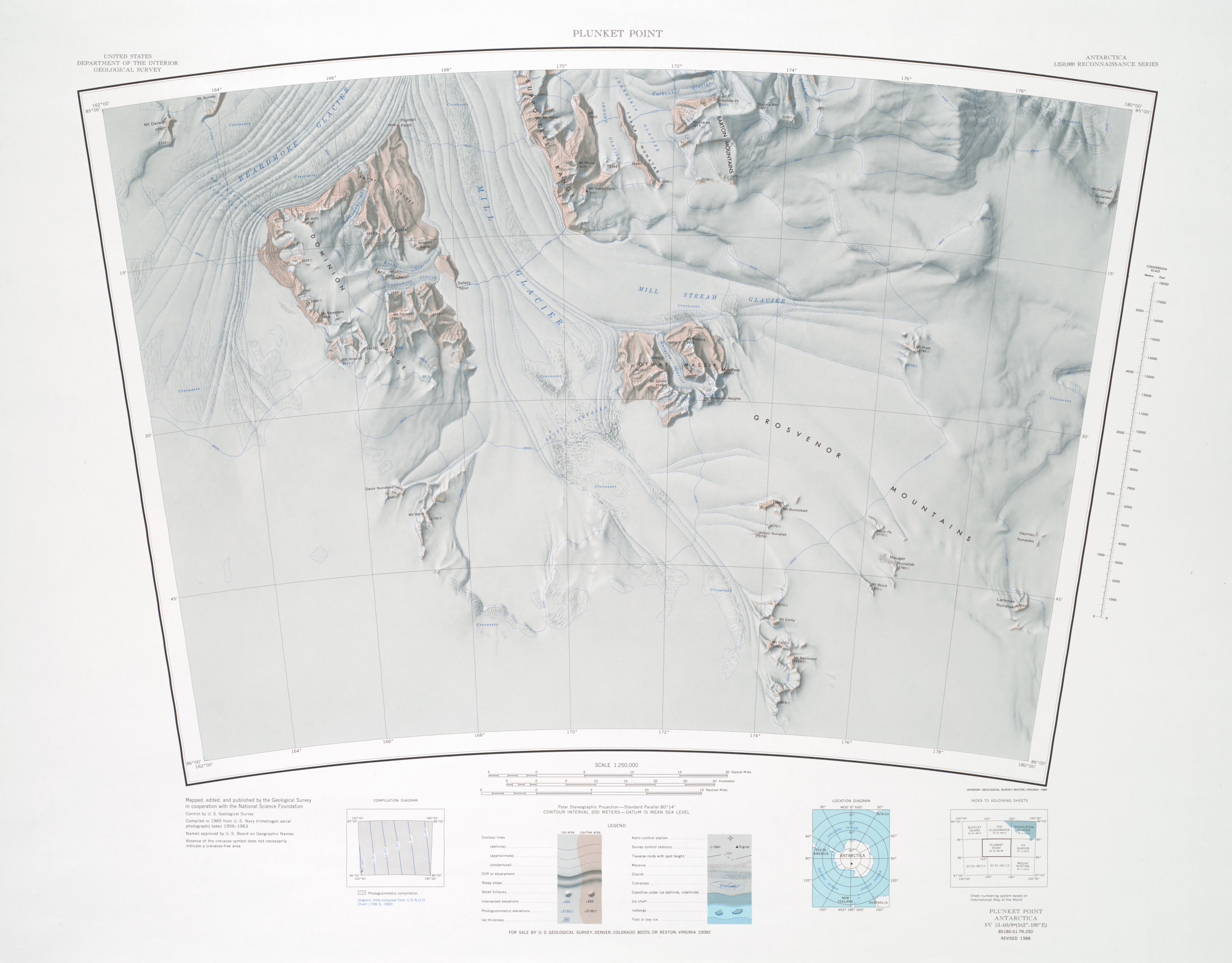
Southern Supports Range northwest of map

Features, from north to south, include:

=== Ranfurly Point ===
84°50′S 169°36′E. A low rocky point marking the convergence of the Beardmore and Keltie Glaciers, at the northern extremity of Supporters Range. Named by D.B. Rainey, Cartographic Branch of the Department of Lands and Survey, New Zealand, for Lord Ranfurly, Governor of New Zealand, 1897-1904.

=== Scully Terrace ===
84°53′S 169°06′E. A bold, flat-topped terrace which is triangular in plan and borders the northwest part of Supporters Range between Ranfurly Point and Mount Kinsey, on the east side of upper Beardmore Glacier. Named in 1986 by United States Advisory Committee on Antarctic Names (US-ACAN) after R. Tucker Scully, Director, Office of Oceans and Polar Affairs, United States Department of State, with responsibility for policy and negotiations relative to Antarctic resources, conservation, and the inspection of foreign stations under the Antarctic Treaty.

=== Mount Kinsey ===
84°55′S 169°18′E. A mountain, 3,110 metres (10,200 ft) high, at the east edge of Beardmore Glacier, standing 5 nautical miles (9.3 km; 5.8 mi) southwest of Ranfurly Point. Named by the British Antarctic Expedition 1907-09 for J.J. Kinsey of Christchurch, who conducted the affairs of the expedition in New Zealand.

=== Mount Westminster ===
84°59′S 169°22′E. A mountain, 3,370 metres (11,060 ft) high, on the east side of Beardmore Glacier, standing 4 nautical miles (7.4 km; 4.6 mi) south of Mount Kinsey. Discovered and named by the British Antarctic Expedition 1907-09. Named for His Grace The 2nd Duke of Westminster (1879-1953), a financial supporter of the expedition.

=== Mount Iveagh ===
85°04′S 169°38′E. A broad mountain in the Supporters Range, overlooking the east side of Mill Glacier 5 nautical miles (9.3 km; 5.8 mi) northwest of Mount White. Discovered by the British Antarctic Expedition of 1907-09 and named for the 1st Viscount Iveagh (1847-1927; later created, in 1919, the 1st Earl of Iveagh), the head of the Guinness family, who helped finance the expedition.

=== Mount Judd ===
85°04′S 170°26′E. A prominent bare rock mountain, over 2,400 metres (7,900 ft) high, surmounting the ridge running north from Mount White. Named by US-ACAN for Robert C. Judd, USARP meteorologist at South Pole Station, winter 1964, and Hallett Station, 1964-65 summer season.

=== Mount White ===
85°09′S 170°18′E. A massive mountain, 3,470 metres (11,380 ft) high, standing 2.5 nautical miles (4.6 km; 2.9 mi) north-northwest of Mount Henry Lucy and forming the highest elevation in the Supporters Range. Discovered by the British Antarctic Expedition 1907-09 and named for the Secretary of the expedition.

=== Mount Henry Lucy ===
85°11′S 170°26′E. A prominent peak, 3,020 metres (9,910 ft) high, standing 2.5 nautical miles (4.6 km; 2.9 mi) south-southeast of Mount White at the south end of Supporters Range. Discovered by the British Antarctic Expedition 1907-09 and named for Sir Henry Lucy, M.P., who publicised Shackleton's expedition and assisted in obtaining a financial grant from Parliament for the expedition.

== Sources ==
- Alberts, Fred G., ed. (1995), Geographic Names of the Antarctic (PDF) (2 ed.), United States Board on Geographic Names This article incorporates public domain material from websites or documents of the United States Board on Geographic Names.
- The Cloudmaker, USGS
- Plunket Point (PDF), USGS
- This article incorporates public domain material from websites or documents of the United States Geological Survey.
