= Mount Clarke =

Mountain in British Columbia, Canada

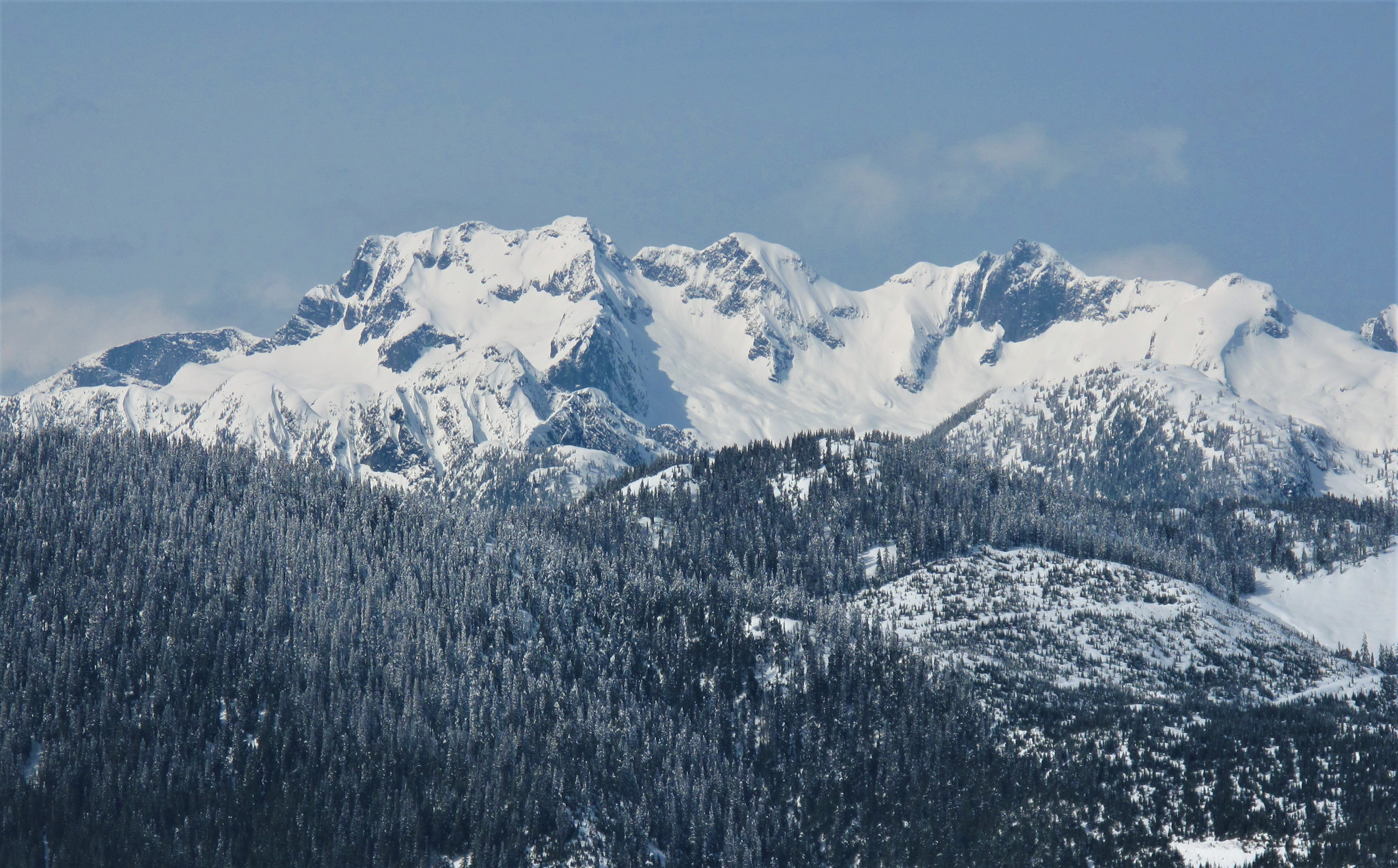
- South aspect

Highest point
- Elevation: 2,159 m (7,083 ft)
- Prominence: 689 m (2,260 ft)
- Coordinates: 49°31′59.0″N 122°06′10.0″W

Geography
- Location within British Columbia
- Location: British Columbia, Canada
- District: New Westminster Land District
- Parent range: Pacific Ranges
- Topo map: NTS 92G9 Stave River

Climbing
- First ascent: 1949 Lan Kay; A. Melville; F. Miles; Howard Rode

Mount Clarke is a mountain in southwestern British Columbia, Canada, located 21 km (13 mi) northwest of Hemlock Valley and 6 km (4 mi) south of Grainger Peak. It is part of the Douglas Ranges, the southernmost subdivision of the Pacific Ranges which in turn form part of the Coast Mountains.

The northwest ridge of Mount Clarke contains the sub-peaks Viennese and Recourse, which are considered separate peaks.
