= Gevers =

Gevers is a Dutch surname that may refer to the following people:

- André Gevers (born 1952), Dutch track cyclist
- Daniël Théodore Gevers van Endegeest (1793–1877), Dutch politician
- Ernest Gevers (1891–1965), Belgian fencer
- Ine Gevers (born 1960), Dutch curator of contemporary art, writer and activist
- Marie Gevers (1883–1975), Belgian novelist
- Nick Gevers (born 1965), South African science fiction editor and critic
- Randy Gevers (born 1981), Dutch motorcycle racer
- Robert Gevers, Belgian field hockey player
- Traugott Wilhelm Gevers (1900–1991), South African geologist
  - Mount Gevers in Antarctica is named after T.W. Gevers
- Wieland Gevers (born 1937), South African academic
- Willem Gevers (1911–1994), Dutch nobleman, diplomat and bobsledder

== See also ==
- Gever (disambiguation)
