= Jaber =

Jaber (Arabic: جابر) is an Arabic name for males used as a given name and surname. Alternative spellings are Gaber, Jabir and Jabeur.

== People with the given name ==
- Jaber Al Mulla (born 1995), Kuwaiti Hungarian Rapper
- Jaber Abu Hussein (c. 1913–1992), Arabic poet
- Jaber Al-Ameri (born 1986), Saudi Arabian footballer
- Jaber Al-Owaisi (born 1989), Omani footballer
- Jaber Al-Ahmad Al-Jaber Al-Sabah (1926–2006), 13th ruler of Kuwait
  - Jaber Al-Ahmad International Stadium
  - Sheikh Jaber Al Ahmad Cultural Centre
  - Sheikh Jaber al-Ahmad al-Sabah Causeway
- Jaber I Al-Sabah (1770–1859), third ruler of Kuwait
- Jaber II Al-Sabah (1860–1917), eighth ruler of Kuwait
- Jaber Al Mamari (born 2001), Qatari sprinter
- Jaber Al-Mubarak Al-Hamad Al-Sabah (1942–2024), Prime Minister of Kuwait
- Jaber Al Mutairi (born 1990), Kuwaiti footballer
- Jaber Alwan (born 1948), Italian artist
- Jaber Ansari (born 1987), Iranian football player
- Jaber Behrouzi (born 1991), Iranian weightlifter
- Jaber Ebdali (born c. 1975), Iranian businessman and white-collar criminal
- Jaber A. Elbaneh (born 1966), or Gabr al-Bana, Yemeni-American terrorist
- Jaber F. Gubrium (born 1943) is an American sociologist
- Jaber Hagawi (born 1981), Saudi Arabian footballer
- Jaber Mustafa (born 1997), Saudi Arabian footballer
- Jaber Rouzbahani (born 1986), Iranian basketball player
- Jaber Saeed Salem, born Yani Marchokov (born 1975), Qatari weightlifter

== People with the surname ==
- Abdul Malik Jaber, Palestinian businessman
- Abdullah Jaber (born 1993), Palestinian footballer
- Ahmed Abdu Jaber (born 1996), Eritrean footballer
- Ahmad Ali Jaber (born 1982), Iraqi football goalkeeper
- Ahmed Jumah Jaber (born 1983), Qatari long-distance runner
- Ali Jaber (born 1961), Lebanese journalist, media consultant and TV personality
- Ali Hassan al-Jaber (1955–2011), camera operator killed in the Libyan Civil War
- Assem Jaber (born 1946), Lebanese diplomat
- Fahad Abo Jaber (born 1985), Saudi footballer
- Fatima Al Jaber (born 1965), COO of Al Jaber Group
- Haji Jaber (born 1976), Eritrean novelist
- Hala Jaber, Lebanese-British journalist
- Hessa Al Jaber, Qatari engineer, academic and politician
- Hisham Jaber (born 1942), Lebanese major general
- Inaya Jaber (1958–2021), Lebanese writer, artist and singer
- Kaltham Jaber (born 1958), Qatari writer and poet
- Khalid Al-Jaber, Qatari academic
- Mohamed Bin Issa Al Jaber (born 1959), Saudi Arabian-born Austrian-British billionaire and philanthropist
- Mohammed Jaber (footballer) (born 1989), Emirati footballer
- Naji Jaber (1940–2009), Syrian actor
- Rabee Jaber (born 1972), Lebanese author, novelist and journalist
- Rabih Jaber (born 1987), Swedish singer of Lebanese descent
- Salih Jaber (born 1985), Iraqi football player
- Sultan Ahmed Al Jaber (born 1973), Emirati politician and businessman
- Tamara Jaber (born 1982), Lebanese - Australian pop singer-songwriter
- Tawfik Jaber (died 2008), chief of police in Gaza, killed in the 2008–2009 Israel–Gaza conflict
- Tiana Jaber (born 2000), Australian football player
- Yassine Jaber (born 1951), Lebanese politician
- Sami Al-Jaber (born 1972), Saudi Arabian footballer
- Zaid Jaber (born 1991), Jordanian footballer
- Zara Nutley (Zahrah Mary Chassib Jaber, 1924–2016), British television actress
