= Gaber =

Gaber may refer to:

== Places ==
- Gaber, Dobrich Province, Bulgaria
- Gaber, Sofia Province, Bulgaria
- Gaber pri Črmošnjicah, Slovenia
- Gaber, Croatia, a village near Desinić

== People ==
- Eman Gaber (born 1989), Egyptian female fencer
- Ernst Gaber (1907–1975), German rower
- Garry M. Gaber, video game designer and programmer
- Giorgio Gaber (Giorgio Gaberscik, 1939-2003), Italian singer-songwriter, actor and playwright
- Harley Gaber (1943–2011), American visual artist and composer
- Karam Gaber (born 1979), Egyptian Greco-Roman wrestler
- Lamis Gaber, Egyptian politician
- Matej Gaber (born 1991), Slovenian handball player
- Mido Gaber (Mohamed Gaber Tawfik Hussein, born 1995), Egyptian footballer
- Mihály Gáber (1753–1815), Slovene priest and writer
- Omar Gaber (born 1992), Egyptian football player
- Sharon Gaber (born 1964), American academic
- Sherif Gaber (born c. 1993), Egyptian political activist

== Other uses ==
- FK Gaber, a Macedonian football club

== See also ==
- Jaber or Jabir, the Arabic names for which Gaber can be an alternative transliteration to
- Jaber (disambiguation)
- Geber (disambiguation)
