= Nancy Weaver Teichert =

American journalist

Nancy Weaver Teichert is an American journalist. A graduate of the Indiana University, in 2014 she was a former The Sacramento Bee reporter.

Weaver was part of a reporting team that won the 1983 Pulitzer Prize for Public Service for the Jackson Clarion-Ledger in Jackson, Mississippi. The newspaper received the award for a series of articles supporting legislation to reform the public education system in Mississippi.

For The Bee, she was a member of the reporting team whose series "A Madness Called Meth" won the 2001 Nancy Dickerson White Award for reporting on drug issues. Teichert has also received the Roy Howard Public Service Award and the World Hunger Award. In 2004, Weaver was awarded the local and regional media award by the American Society on Aging for her body of work, in-depth aging knowledge, and sensitivity to ageism Teichert has also served on the staff of the Denver Post.

- Teichert, Nancy Weaver. The Wreck of the Washoe:The Worst Maritime Disaster on the Sacramento River Sacramento Pioneer Association, 2014
