= Marks Point =

Marks Point may refer to:

- Marks Point, New South Wales
- Marks Point (Antarctica)
