= Jaba =

Jaba may refer to:

== Places ==
- Jaba Dimtu, Kare County, Kenya
- Jaba, Nigeria
- Jaba', Haifa Subdistrict, a Palestinian Arab village depopulated in 1948
- Jaba', Jenin, a Palestinian village in the West Bank
- Jaba', Jerusalem, a Palestinian town in the West Bank
- Jab'a, Bethlehem Governorate, a Palestinian village in the central West Bank
- Jaba, Lebanon, a town in southern Lebanon
- Jaba River, in Bougainville, Papua New Guinea
- Jabah, village in Syria

== Other uses ==
- Jaba (given name), including a list of people with that name
- Jabá, (Silvino João de Carvalho, born 1981), Brazilian footballer
- Léo Jabá (born 1998), Brazilian footballer
- Journal of Applied Behavior Analysis (JABA), an academic journal
- Jaba language, or Hyam language
- Operation Jaba', or Operation Shoter, an Israeli operation during the 1948 Arab–Israeli War

== See also ==
- Jabba (disambiguation)
- Jaber (disambiguation)
- Ya ba, a recreational drug
