= Geber =

Geber is the Latinized form of the Arabic name Jabir. It may refer to:

- Jabir ibn Hayyan (died c. 806–816), early Islamic alchemist and polymath
  - Pseudo-Geber, name given to the anonymous authors of the 13th–14th century Latin alchemical writings attributed to Jabir ibn Hayyan
- Jabir ibn Aflah (1100–1150), Spanish-Arab astronomer and mathematician
- Geber (crater), a crater on the Moon named after Jabir ibn Aflah
- Nick Geber, England-born, American sports radio and television personality
- Sara Zeff Geber, American writer

== See also ==
- Gever (disambiguation)
- Jaber (disambiguation)
- Ezion-Geber, a biblical seaport on the northern extremity of the Gulf of Aqaba
