= 2003 Union for Reform Judaism resolution on the medicinal use of marijuana =

In November 2003, the Union for Reform Judaism (URJ) passed a resolution concerning medical cannabis at its general assembly in Minneapolis. The resolution became the first endorsement of medical cannabis by any religious body. (Note: Another source says Unitarian Universalist Association became "the first religious denomination to adopt a statement of conscience" in 2002, calling for legalization and regulation of marijuana but not legalized medical marijuana specifically. Two other Jewish organizations passed resolutions before then: Women for Reform Judaism passed a resolution in support of making it legal for physicians to prescribe marijuana to critically ill patients in 1999, and the Central Conference of American Rabbis passed a similar resolution in 2001.)

== Roots ==
The measure was preceded by a 1999 resolution adopted by Women of Reform Judaism, under the leadership of board member Jane Marcus. Marcus, who contributed to the passage of the 2003 resolution by the full denomination and became a founding board member of the Interfaith Drug Policy Initiative, described her motivation: "A beloved friend from my synagogue contracted HIV from a blood transfusion. She was down to 85 pounds and had no desire for food. Marijuana brought back her appetite and extended her life for three years. That’s when I started asking myself, why is this illegal?" The Women of Reform Judaism resolution was possibly influenced by Beth Am Women of Los Altos Hills, California who successfully introduced a resolution at Pacific District of Women of Reform Judaism's San Jose, California convention in 1999 preceding the 1999 national convention.

== Commentary ==
According to Carol Saline, "Jews have been in the forefront of the effort to legalize medical marijuana, perhaps because of what Rabbi Dayle Friedman attributes to the 'strong mandate about healing in Judaism.'"
