= Gever =

Gever may refer to:

- Yüksekova (Kurdish: Gever), a city and district of Hakkari Province, Turkey
- Gever, Netherlands, a hamlet in the Dutch province of North Brabant

== See also ==
- Geber (disambiguation)
- Gevers, a surname
