= Amundsen Glacier =

Glacier in Antarctica

- Location within Antarctica
- Location: Ross Dependency
- Coordinates: 85°35′S 159°4′W
- Length: 150 km (93 mi)
- Width: 10 km (6.2 mi)
- Terminus: Ross Ice Shelf

The Amundsen Glacier (85°35′S 159°00′W) is a major Antarctic glacier, about 7 to 11 km (4 to 6 nmi) wide and 150 km (80 nmi) long. It originates on the Antarctic Plateau where it drains the area to the south and west of Nilsen Plateau, then descends through the Queen Maud Mountains to enter the Ross Ice Shelf just west of the MacDonald Nunataks.

== Name ==
The Amundsen Glacier was discovered by Richard E. Byrd on the South Pole flight in November 1929. The name was proposed for Roald Amundsen by Laurence Gould, leader of the Byrd Antarctic Expedition (Byrd AE) geological party which sledged past the mouth of the glacier in December 1929.

== Location ==
According to Sailing Directions for Antarctica (1960), "Lying eastward of the Bowman Glacier is the Amundsen Glacier, the northern portal of which is in 85°30' S., 159°00' W. It is about 6 miles wide and trends southward about 60 miles to the polar plateau. Mount Helmer Hanssen, about 10,742 feet high, is a rounded dome, completely snow-covered, standing conspicuously above the westem wall. A tributary glacier, about 5 miles wide, enters the Amundsen Glacier on the northern side of the Mount Helmer Hanssen massif. The Amundsen Glacier has not been traversed. "

The Amundsen Glacier rises on the polar plateau to the west of the Rawson Mountains. It flows northwest to the Nødtvedt Nunataks, which it passes on both sides, and is fed by the Norway Glacier from the left (west) south of Mount Hassel, where it wheels to the north and then northeast, fed by Devils Glacier from the left, by the Epler Glacier from the right and then by the Christy Glacier from the left. The tributary Blackwall Glacier flows northwest along the northeast side of Hansen Spur to join Amundsen Glacier. It flows north through past Beck Peak and the Breyer Mesa. Continuing north it is joined by the Tate Glacier, Moffett Glacier and Whitney Glacier from the left, and by the Cappellari Glacier to the right. As it enters the Ross Ice Shelf between Witalis Peak and the MacDonald Nunataks it converges with the Bowman Glacier on the left and the Goodale Glacier on the right.

== Left tributaries ==
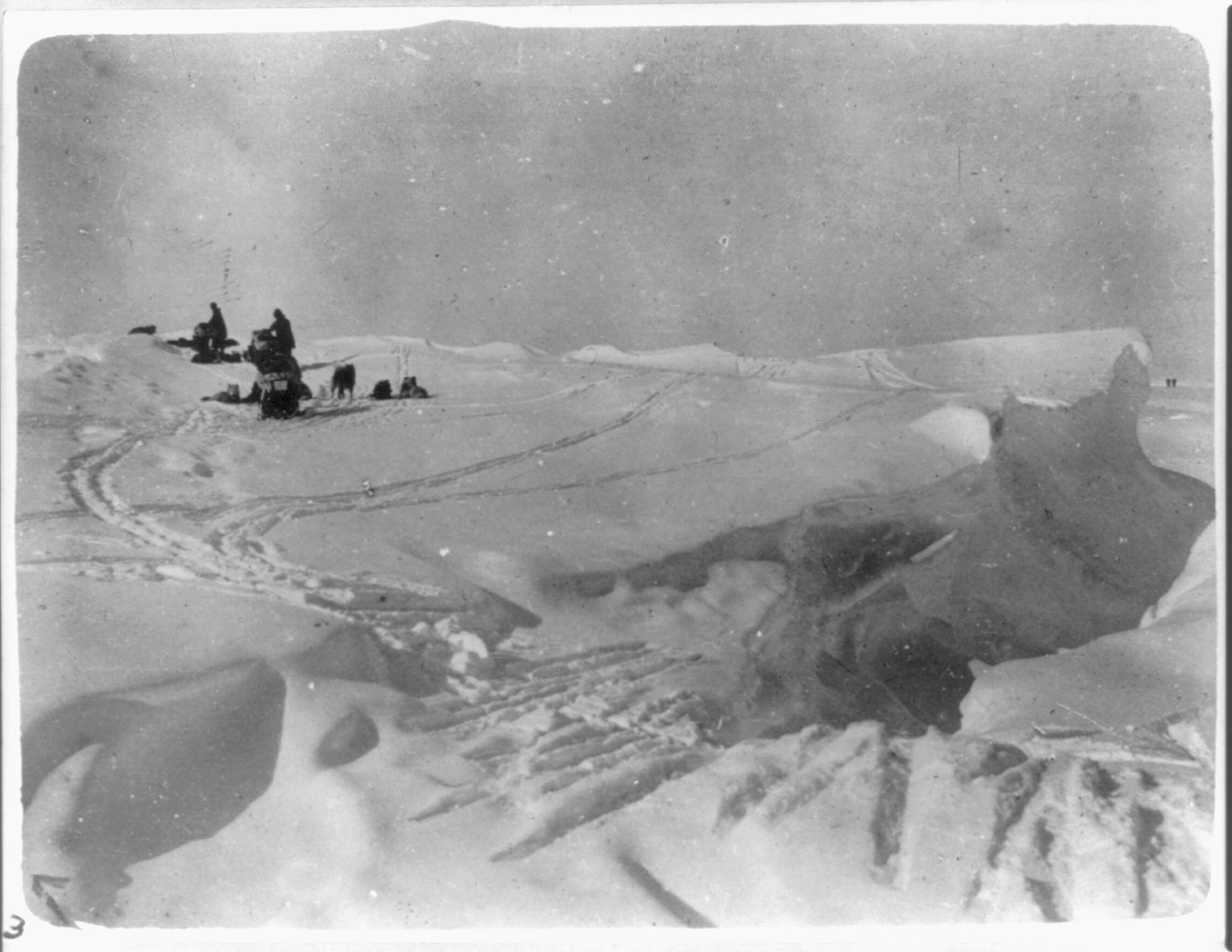
A view at the top of the Devils Glacier

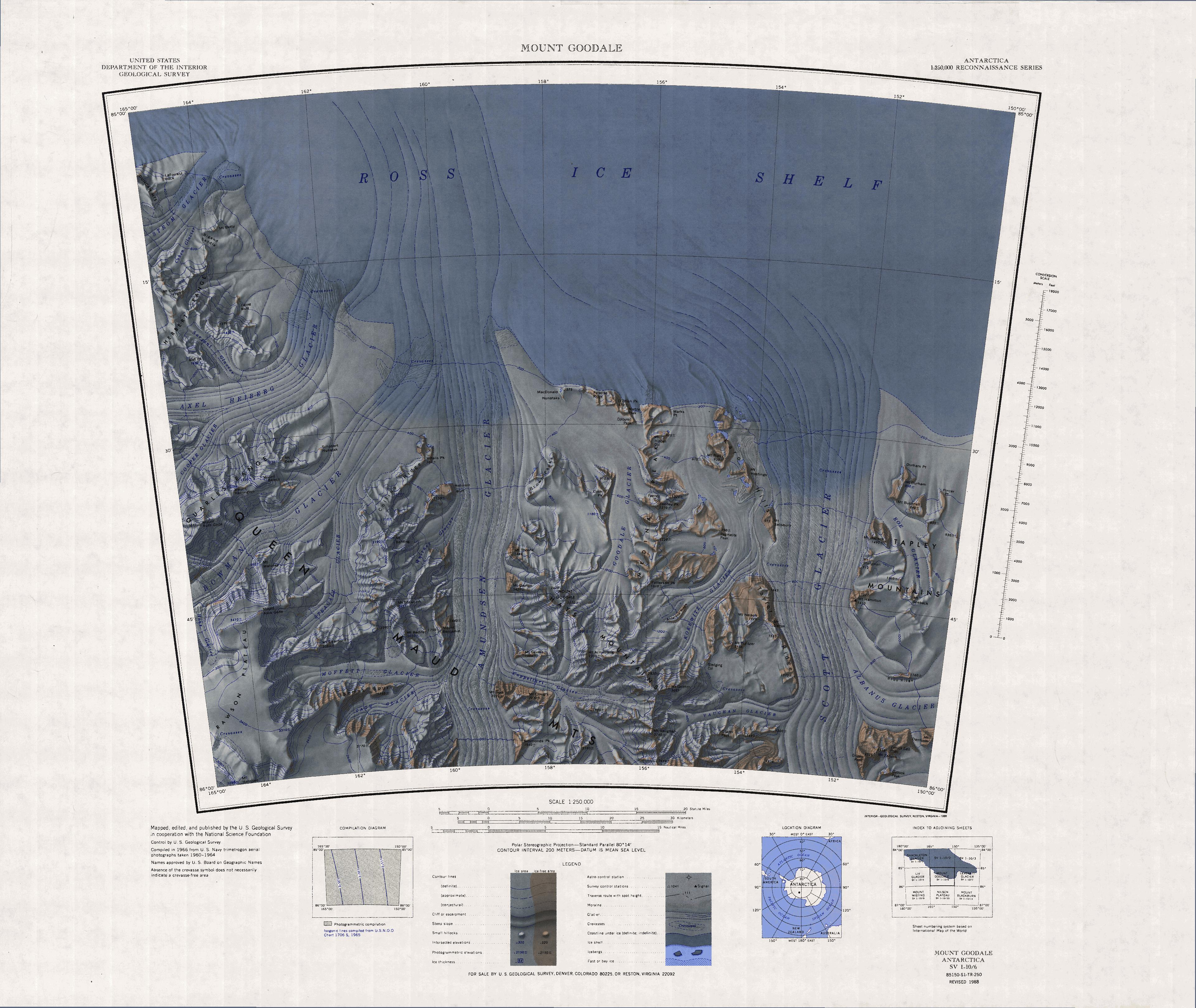
Lower Amundsen Glacier in center

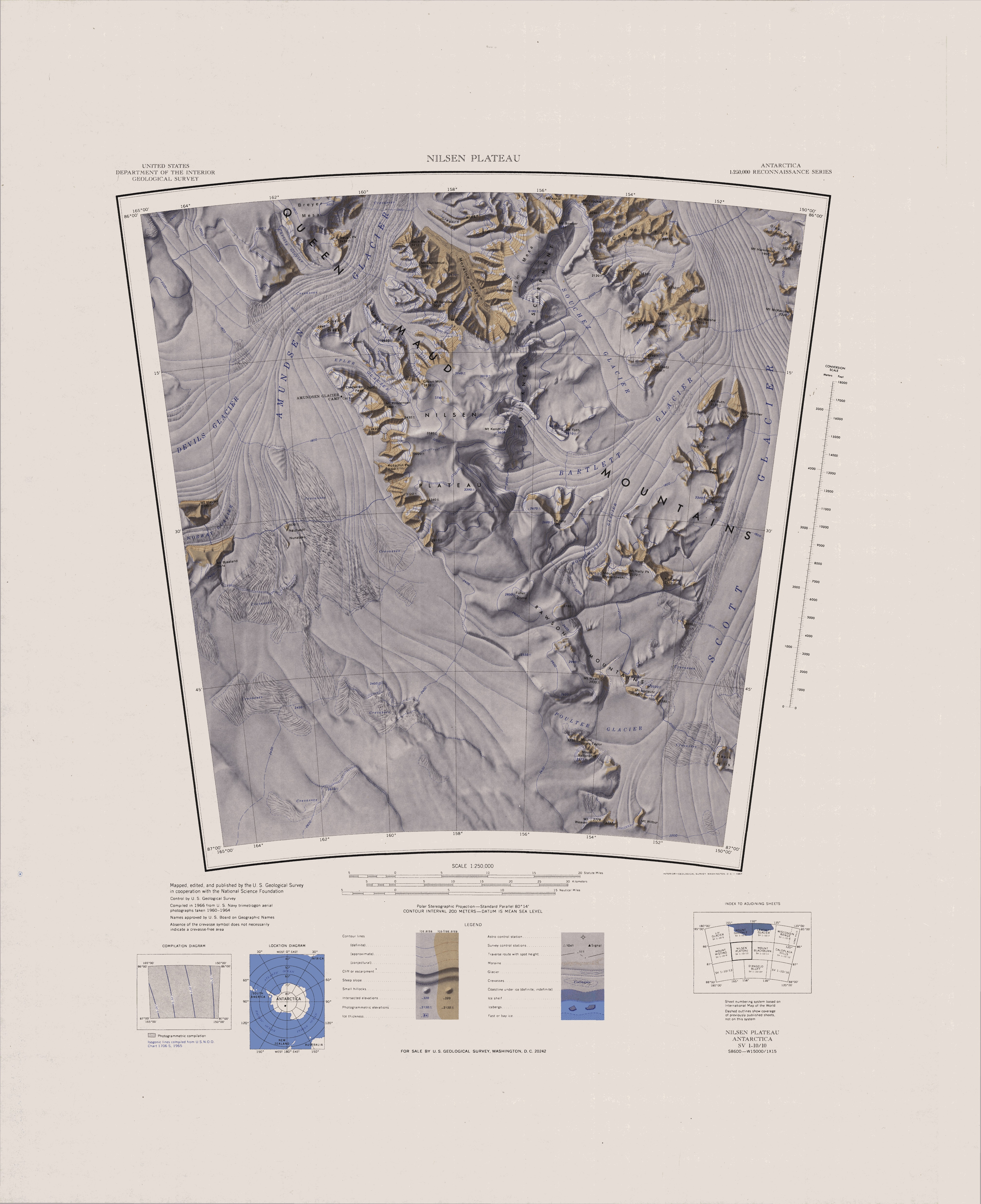
Upper Amundsen Glacier to the northwest

Left (west) tributaries from south to north are:

=== Norway Glacier ===
86°30′S 164°00′W A tributary glacier about 10 nautical miles (19 km; 12 mi) long, descending the polar plateau just west of Mount Prestrud, and flowing northeast to enter Amundsen Glacier between Mount Bjaaland and Mount Hassel. Named by the Advisory Committee on Antarctic Names (US-ACAN) in association with the many features named in this area for members of Amundsen's Norwegian expedition of 1910-12.

=== Devils Glacier ===
86°23′S 165°00′W. A heavily crevassed glacier at the edge of the polar plateau, about 20 nautical miles (37 km; 23 mi) long and 8 nautical miles (15 km; 9.2 mi) wide, draining the south part of the Mohn Basin and flowing northeast to enter the upper part of Amundsen Glacier just north of the mountain group consisting of Mount Wisting, Mount Hassel, Mount Bjaaland and Mount Prestrud. The glacier was encountered by Roald Amundsen's South Pole Party in 1911 and was named by them to describe the extremely rough sledging in the area. Amundsen's route southward, between 168° and 169°W, took the party across the upper or western portion of the glacier.

=== Christy Glacier ===
86°06′S 161°30′W. A steep tributary glacier draining southeast along the southwest side of Breyer Mesa to enter Amundsen Glacier. Mapped by United States Geological Survey (USGS) from surveys and United States Navy air photos, 1960-64. Named by US-ACAN for Clarence C. Christy, maintenance shop supervisor at Williams Field, McMurdo Sound, on USN OpDFrz 1967.

=== Tate Glacier ===
85°54′S 160°50′W. A tributary glacier on the south side of Thomas Spur, flowing east and merging with Moffett Glacier just east of the spur where the two glaciers enter the larger Amundsen Glacier. Mapped by USGS from surveys and USN air photos, 1960-64. Named by US-ACAN for Robert Tate, geomagnetist / seismologist with the South Pole Station winter party, 1964.

=== Moffett Glacier ===
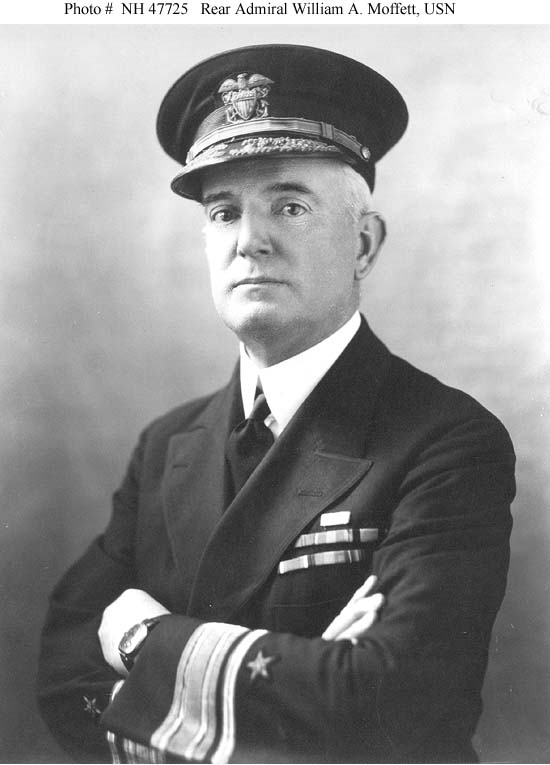
R. Admiral William A. Moffett, USN

85°52′S 161°00′W. A tributary glacier, 13 nautical miles (24 km; 15 mi) long, flowing east from Rawson Plateau to enter Amundsen Glacier just south of Mount Benjamin. Discovered by R. Admiral Byrd on the South Pole flight of Nov. 28-29, 1929, and named by him for R. Admiral William A. Moffett, USN, first Chief of the Bureau of Aeronautics, Dept. of the Navy.

=== Whitney Glacier ===
85°39′S 160°00′W. A tributary glacier, 6 nautical miles (11 km; 6.9 mi) long, draining northeast from Mount Ellsworth to enter Amundsen Glacier just south of Robinson Bluff. Discovered and mapped by the ByrdAE, 1928-30. Named by US-ACAN for Raymond L. Whitney, meteorologist, South Pole Station winter party, 1961.

=== Bowman Glacier ===
85°34′S 162°00′W. A deeply entrenched glacier, 40 nautical miles (74 km; 46 mi) long, descending the polar plateau between Quarles Range and Rawson Plateau of the Queen Maud Mountains to enter the Ross Ice Shelf just west of the flow of Amundsen Glacier. Discovered in December 1929 by the Byrd Antarctic Expedition geological party under Laurence Gould, and named by Byrd for Isaiah Bowman, eminent geographer and president of Johns Hopkins University, 1935-49; Director of the American Geographical Society, 1915–35.

=== Steagall Glacier ===
85°38′S 161°54′W. A tributary glacier, 15 nautical miles (28 km; 17 mi) long, draining the east slopes of Rawson Plateau between Mount Alice Gade and Mount Deardorff and flowing north to enter Bowman Glacier. First mapped by the Byrd Antarctic Expedition, 1928–30. Named by US-ACAN for Jack Steagall, meteorologist, South Pole Station winter party, 1961.

== Right tributaries ==
Right (east) tributaries from south to north are:

=== Epler Glacier ===
86°15′S 161°00′W. A tributary glacier, 10 nautical miles (19 km; 12 mi) long, draining west from Nilsen Plateau to enter Amundsen Glacier just south of Olsen Crags. Mapped by USGS from surveys and USN air photos, 1960-64. Named by US-ACAN for Charles F. Epler, storekeeper with USN Squadron VX-6 on Operation Deep Freeze 1966 and 1967.

=== Blackwall Glacier ===
86°10′S 159°40′W. A tributary glacier, 8 nautical miles (15 km; 9.2 mi) long, which drains a portion of the west slope of Nilsen Plateau. It flows northwest along the northeast side of Hansen Spur to join Amundsen Glacier. The name was used by both the 1963-64 and 1970-71 Ohio State University field parties at Nilsen Plateau; all the rock walls surrounding this glacier are black in appearance.

=== Cappellari Glacier ===
85°52′S 158°40′W. A glacier 11 nautical miles (20 km; 13 mi) long in the Hays Mountains, flowing west from the northwest shoulder of Mount Vaughan to enter Amundsen Glacier just north of Mount Dort. First roughly mapped by the ByrdAE, 1928-30. Remapped by USGS from ground surveys and USN air photos, 1960-64. Named by US-ACAN for Lewis K. Cappellari who made ionospheric studies at McMurdo Station in 1965.

=== Goodale Glacier ===
85°35′S 156°24′W. A glacier which flows north from Mount Goodale and Mount Armstrong along the west side of Medina Peaks, in the foothills of the Queen Maud Mountains. First seen and mapped by the ByrdAE, 1928-30. Named by US-ACAN in association with Mount Goodale.

== Head of glacier ==
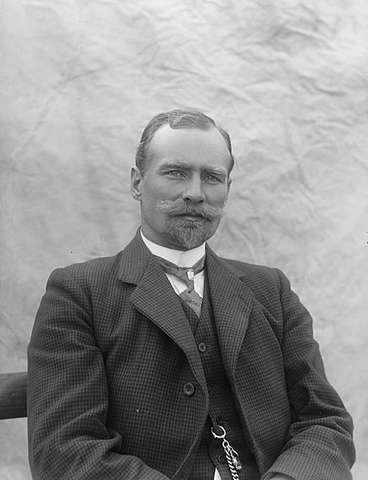
Sverre Hassel 1912

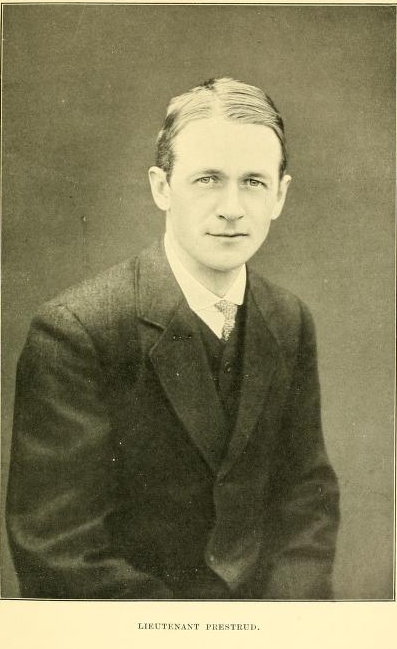
Kristian Prestrud in 1913

A mountain group consisting of Mount Wisting, Mount Hassel, Mount Bjaaland and Mount Prestrud lies at the head of the Amundsen Glacier just south of the point where the Devils Glacier enters from the left. In November 1911, a number of mountain peaks in this general vicinity were observed and rudely positioned by the South Pole Party under Roald Amundsen. He named peaks in the massif for members of his South Pole Party. The peaks were mapped by USGS from surveys and U.S. Navy aerial photography in 1960–64. For the sake of historical continuity and to commemorate the Norwegian exploration in this area, the US-ACAN assigned Amundsen's chosen names to the peaks.

=== Mount Wisting ===
86°27′S 165°26′W. A rock peak (2,580 m), the north westernmost summit of the massif. Amundsen named one of the peaks for Oscar Wisting, a member of the party. The US-ACAN has selected this feature to be designated Mount Wisting.

=== Mount Hassel ===
86°28′S 164°28′W. A rock peak 2,390 metres (7,840 ft) high, the northeasternmost summit of the massif. Amundsen named one of the peaks for Sverre Hassel, a member of the party. The US-ACAN has selected this feature to be designated Mount Hassel..

=== Mount Bjaaland ===
86°33′S 164°14′W. A rock peak 2,675 metres (8,776 ft) high, the southeasternmost summit of the massif. Amundsen named one of the peaks for Olaf Bjaaland, a member of the party. The US-ACAN has selected this feature to be designated Mount Bjaaland.

=== Mount Prestrud ===
86°34′S 165°07′W. A peak over 2,400 metres (7,900 ft) high which rises from the southwestern part of the massif. Amundsen named one of the peaks for Lieutenant Kristian Prestrud, first officer of the Fram and leader of the Norwegian expedition's Eastern Sledge Party to the Scott Nunataks. The US-ACAN has selected this feature to be designated Mount Prestrud.

== Sources ==
- Alberts, Fred G., ed. (1995), Geographic Names of the Antarctic (PDF) (2 ed.), United States Board on Geographic Names This article incorporates public domain material from websites or documents of the United States Board on Geographic Names.
- "Blackwall Glacier", Geographic Names Information System, United States Geological Survey, United States Department of the Interior
- Mount Goodale, USGS: United States Geological Survey
- Nilsen Plateau, USGS: United States Geological Survey
- Sailing Directions for Antarctica: Including the Off-Lying Islands South of Latitude 60 Degrees S. (2 ed.), United States. Hydrographic Office, 1960 This article incorporates public domain material from websites or documents of the United States Hydrographic Office.

This article incorporates public domain material from websites or documents of the United States Geological Survey.
