= Quarles Range =

Rugged mountain range in Antarctica

- Location within Antarctica

Geography
- Continent: Antarctica
- Region: Ross Dependency
- Range coordinates: 85°36′S 164°30′W

Quarles Range (85°36′S 164°30′W) is a high and rugged range of the Queen Maud Mountains, extending from the polar plateau between Cooper Glacier and Bowman Glacier and terminating near the edge of Ross Ice Shelf.

== Discovery and naming ==
Peaks in the range were first sighted by Captain Roald Amundsen in 1911, and the range was mapped in detail by the Byrd Antarctic Expedition, 1928–30. It was named by the Advisory Committee on Antarctic Names (US-ACAN) for Donald A. Quarles, United States Secretary of the Air Force, 1955–57, and United States Deputy Secretary of Defense, 1957–59, at the outset of the International Geophysical Year and organization of United States activity in Antarctica.

== Location ==
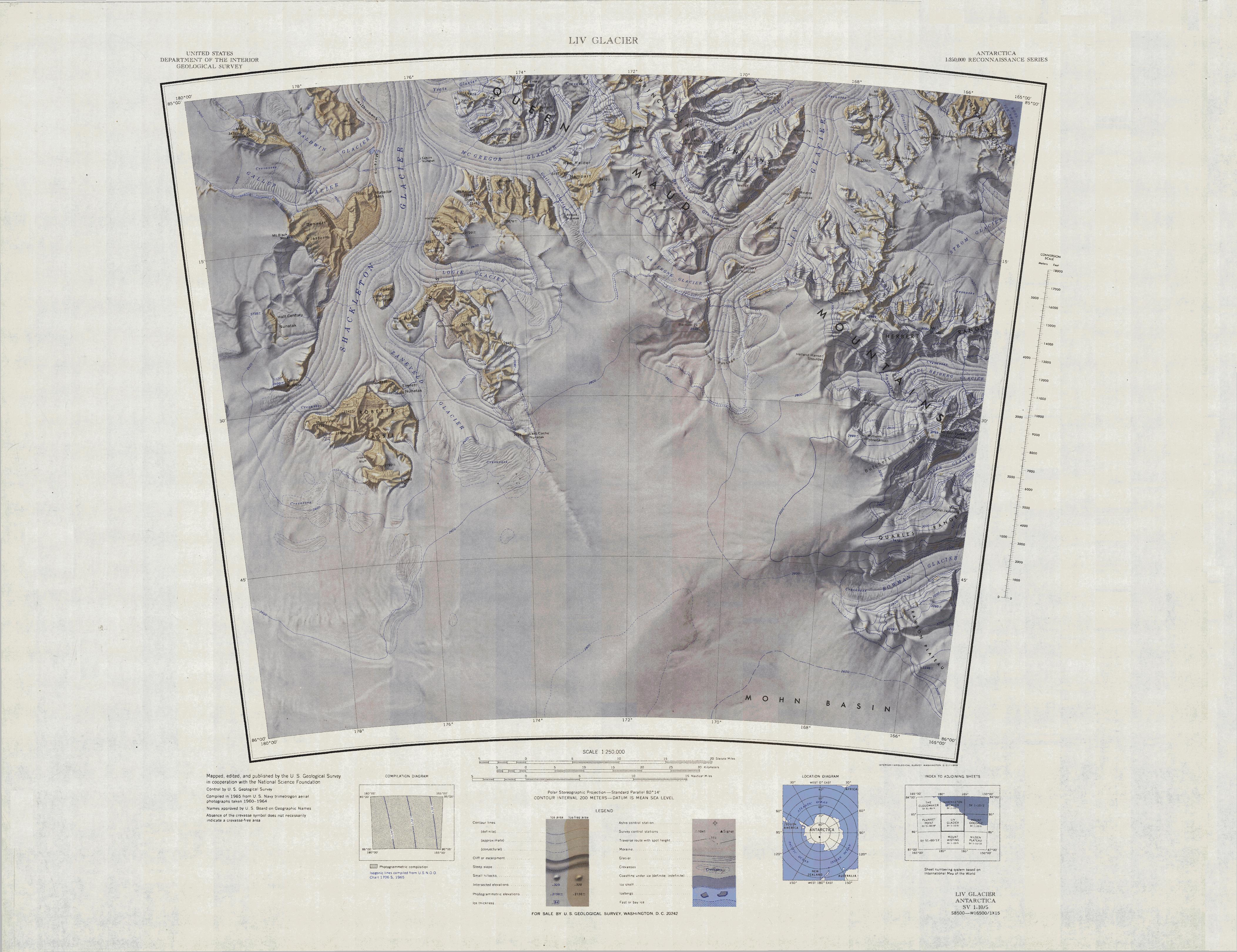
Western Quarles Range to the southeast, north of Bowman Glacier and Rawson Plateau

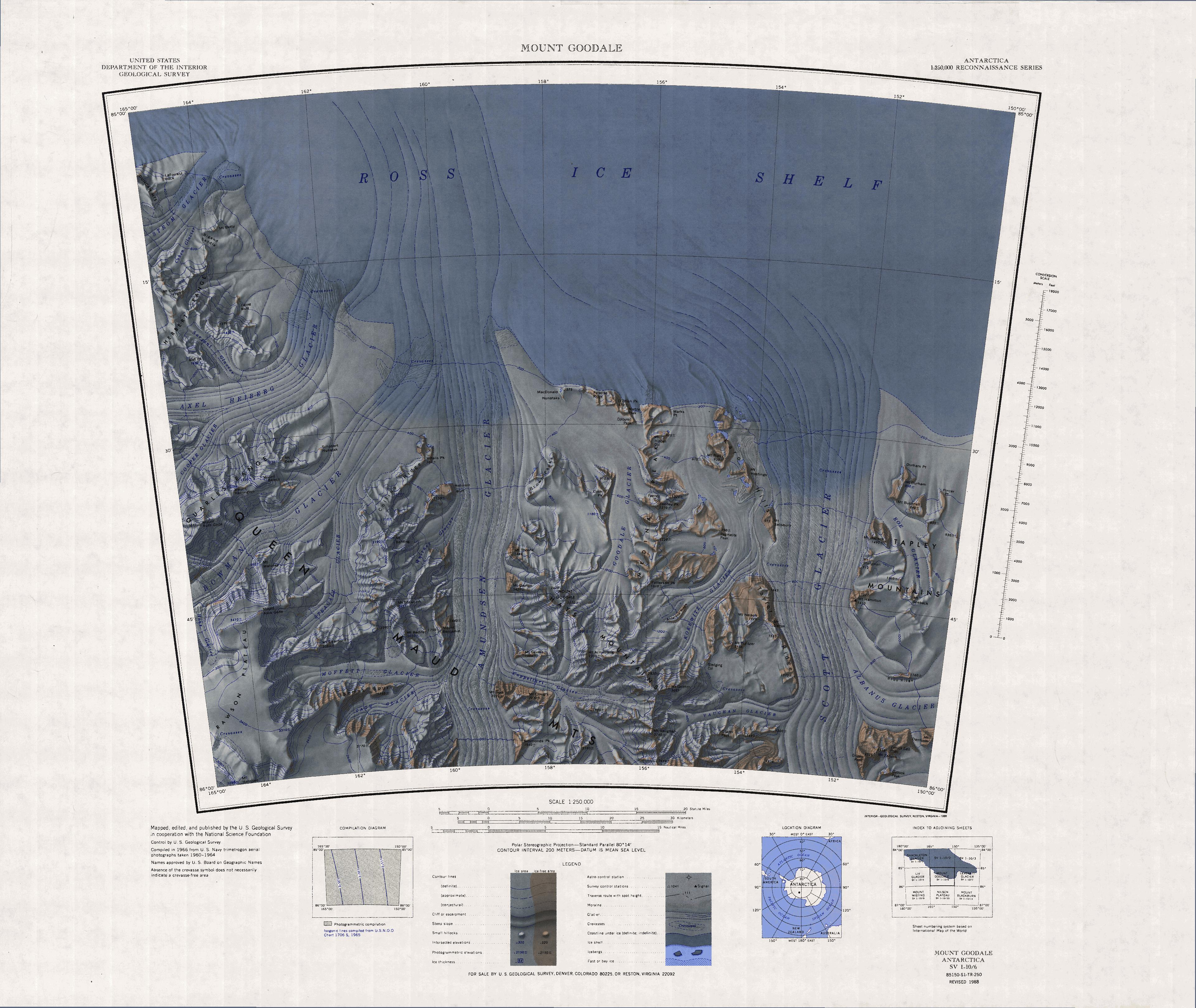
Eastern Quarles Range to the west, between Bowman Glacier and Axel Heiberg Glacier

The west of the Quarles Range is north of the head of the Bowman Glacier, which in turn is north of Rawson Plateau. The Mohn Basin lies to the southwest. Mount Wedel-Jarlsburg rises above the head of the Cooper Glacier to the north. Further east, the range extends between Cooper Glacier, a tributary of Axel Heiberg Glacier to the north, and Bowman Glacier, another tributary of Axel Heiberg Glacier to the southeast. Peaks from west to east include Mount Ruth Gade, Mount Harrington, Mount Balecz, Mount Dean and Schobert Nunatak. Rawson Plateau includes Mount Hanssen in the south, the Thomas Spur extending between Tate Glacier and Moffett Glacier to the east, Mount Deardorff, Mount Alice Gade and Mount Maloney.

== Features ==
=== Mount Wedel-Jarlsberg ===
85°39′S 165°08′W. An ice-covered mountain between Cooper and Bowman Glaciers, standing 2 nautical miles (3.7 km; 2.3 mi) southwest of Mount Ruth Gade in the Quarles Range. Discovered in December 1911 by Roald Amundsen, and named by him for Alice Wedel-Jarlsberg, wife of a Norwegian diplomat.

=== Mount Ruth Gade ===
85°37′S 164°40′W. A pyramidal mountain, 3,515 metres (11,532 ft) high, standing 3 nautical miles (5.6 km; 3.5 mi) northeast of Mount Wedel-Jarlsberg in the Quarles Range. Discovered in November 1911 by Capt. Roald Amundsen, and named by him for one of the daughters of the Norwegian minister to Brazil, a strong supporter of Amundsen. According to Sailing Directions for Antarctica (1960), "Mount Ruth Gade, [is] a striking rounded pyramidal massif, completely snow-clad, rising to about 11,960 feet. The Isaiah Bowman Glacier (85°30' S., 160° W.) lies southeastward of Mount Ruth Gade, and is about 5 miles wide and 30 miles long trending in a northeast-southwest direction.

=== Mount Harrington ===
85°34′S 164°00′W. A mountain, 2,550 metres (8,370 ft) high, standing 4 nautical miles (7.4 km; 4.6 mi) northeast of Mount Ruth Gade in the Quarles Range. Mapped by the Byrd Antarctic Expedition, 1928–30, and by the United States Geological Survey (USGS) from surveys and United States Navy air photos, 1960-64. Named by the United States Advisory Committee on Antarctic Names (US-ACAN) for John R. Harrington, meteorologist with the South Pole Station winter party, 1962.

=== Mount Belecz ===
85°34′S 163°27′W. An ice-covered, flat-topped mountain, 2,120 metres (6,960 ft) high, standing 6 nautical miles (11 km; 6.9 mi) northeast of Mount Ruth Gade in the Quarles Range. First mapped from ground surveys and air photos by the Byrd Antarctic Expedition, 1928-30. Named by US-ACAN for Dan M. Belecz, meteorologist with the South Pole Station winter party in 1962.

=== Mount Dean ===
85°32′S 163°00′W. A mountain, 1,620 metres (5,310 ft) high, standing at the northeast end of the Quarles Range, 2 nautical miles (3.7 km; 2.3 mi) northeast of Mount Belecz. Probably first seen by Roald Amundsen's polar party in 1911. First mapped by the Byrd Antarctic Expedition, 1928-30. Named by US-ACAN for Jesse D. Dean, meteorologist with the South Pole Station party of 1962.

=== Schobert Nunatak ===
85°31′S 162°14′W. A nunatak overlooking the terminus of Bowman Glacier, standing 4 nautical miles (7.4 km; 4.6 mi) east of Mount Dean, at the northeast end of Quarles Range. First mapped by the Byrd Antarctic Expedition, 1928-30. Named by US-ACAN for William J. Schobert, aviation electrician and maintenance shop supervisor with United States Navy Squadron VX-6 for several Deep Freeze operations, 1964-67 period.

== Rawson Plateau ==
85°52′S 164°45′W. An ice-covered plateau, 15 nautical miles (28 km; 17 mi) long and 3,400 metres (11,200 ft) high, rising between the heads of the Bowman, Moffett and Steagall Glaciers. Mapped by the Byrd Antarctic Expedition, 1928–30, and by the USGS from surveys and United States Navy air photos, 1960-64. Named for Kennett L. Rawson, a contributor to the Byrd Antarctic Expedition, 1928–30, and a member of the Byrd Antarctic Expedition, 1933-35.

Features include:

=== Mount Hanssen ===
85°59′S 164°28′W. An ice-covered mountain distinguished by a sharp peak, 3,280 metres (10,760 ft) high, standing at the southernmost point of Rawson Plateau. Discovered by Capt. Roald Amundsen while enroute to the South Pole in November 1911, and named by him for Helmer Hanssen, deputy leader of the South Pole Party.

=== Thomas Spur ===
85°53′S 161°40′W. A prominent spur extending eastward from Rawson Plateau between Moffett and Tate Glaciers. Mapped by USGS from surveys and United States Navy air photos, 1960-64. Named by US-ACAN for Harry F. Thomas, meteorologist, South Pole Station winter party, 1960.

=== Mount Alice Gade ===
85°45′S 163°40′W. A mainly ice-covered mountain over 3,400 metres (11,200 ft) high, marking the northeast extremity of the Rawson Plateau. Discovered in November 1911 by Captain Roald Amundsen, and named by him for one of the daughters of the Norwegian minister to Brazil, a strong supporter of Amundsen. According to Sailing Directions for Antarctica (1960), "Mount Alice Gade, about 11,270 feet high, is snow-clad from its base to the well-rounded summit, and is the highest peak of an extensive broken massif forming the southwestern flank of the Bowman Glacier. A large tributary glacier, about 13 miles long and 3 miles wide, descends northward from the slopes of Mount Alice Gade and enters the Bowman Glacier about 10 miles southward of the northern portal."

=== Mount Maloney ===
85°41′S 163°35′W. A mountain, 1,990 metres (6,530 ft) high, standing 4 nautical miles (7.4 km; 4.6 mi) north of Mount Alice Gade at the southeast side of Bowman Glacier. Discovered and mapped by the Byrd Antarctic Expedition, 1928-30. Named by US-ACAN for John H. Maloney, Jr., meteorologist with the South Pole Station winter party, 1960.

=== Breyer Mesa ===
86°01′S 161°12′W. An ice-covered mesa, 5 nautical miles (9.3 km; 5.8 mi) long and rising over 3,000 metres (9,800 ft), standing between Christy Glacier and Tate Glacier on the west side of Amundsen Glacier. Discovered by Rear Admiral Byrd on the South Pole flight of November 1929, and named by him for Robert S. Breyer, West Coast representative and patron of the Byrd Antarctic Expedition, 1928-30. The name "Mount Breyer" was previously recommended for this feature, but the US-ACAN has amended the terminology to the more suitable Breyer Mesa.

=== Waugh Peak ===
86°04′S 160°36′W. A rock peak, 2,430 metres (7,970 ft) high, standing just southeast of Breyer Mesa at the west side of Amundsen Glacier. Named by US-ACAN after Douglas Waugh, Chief Cartographer with the American Geological Society from 1963, who has contributed much to the Society's Antarctic mapping program.

== Northeast massif ==
The massif to the northeast of Rawson Plateau between the west side of the Amundsen Glacier and the east side of the Bowman Glacier just before their mouths on the Ross Ice Shelf contains, from southwest to northeast, Mount Deardorff, Mount Redifer, Mount Benjamin, Mount Ellsworth, Mount Benting, Collins Ridge, Witalis Peak and Robinson Bluff. The Steagall Glacier runs along the south west side of the massif, and the Moffett Glacier along its south side.

=== Mount Deardorff ===
85°48′S 162°34′W. Prominent peak, 2,380 metres (7,810 ft) high, surmounting the massive ridge dividing the heads of Moffett and Steagall Glaciers. First mapped from ground surveys and air photos by the Byrd Antarctic Expedition, 1928-30. Named by US-ACAN for J. Evan Deardorff who made cosmic ray studies at McMurdo Station in 1964.

=== Mount Redifer ===
85°48′S 160°52′W. A mountain, 2,050 metres (6,730 ft) high, standing 3 nautical miles (5.6 km; 3.5 mi) south of Mount Ellsworth. Mapped by USGS from ground surveys and United States Navy air photos, 1960-64. Named by US-ACAN for Howard D. Redifer, meteorology electronics technician at South Pole Station, 1959.

=== Mount Benjamin ===
85°48′S 160°06′W. A prominent mountain, 1,750 metres (5,740 ft) high, rising sharply at the west side of Amundsen Glacier, 5 nautical miles (9.3 km; 5.8 mi) SE of Mount Ellsworth. First seen and mapped by the Byrd Antarctic Expedition, 1928-30. Named by US-ACAN for Benjamin F. Smith, meteorologist with the McMurdo Station winter party, 1963.

=== Mount Ellsworth ===
85°45′S 161°00′W. The highest peak, 2,925 metres (9,596 ft) high, on the elongated massif between Steagall and Amundsen Glaciers. Discovered by Rear Admiral Byrd on the South Pole flight of November 28–29, 1929, and named by him for Lincoln Ellsworth, American Antarctic explorer.

=== Mount Behling ===
85°40′S 161°04′W. An ice-covered, flat-topped mountain, 2,190 metres (7,190 ft) high, standing between the Steagall and Whitney Glaciers and 5 nautical miles (9.3 km; 5.8 mi) north of Mount Ellsworth. First mapped from ground surveys and air photos by the Byrd Antarctic Expedition, 1928-30. Named by US-ACAN for Robert E. Behling, USARP glaciologist on the South Pole-Queen Maud Land Traverse II, summer 1965-66.

=== Collins Ridge ===
85°35′S 160°48′W. A rugged, ice-covered ridge which extends north from Mount Behling to the Bowman Glacier, where it trends northeast between the confluence of the Bowman and Amundsen Glaciers. Mapped from ground surveys and air photos by the Byrd Antarctic Expedition, 1928-30. Named by US-ACAN for Henry C. Collins, Asst. Chief, Branch of Special Maps, U.S. Geological Survey.

=== Witalis Peak ===
85°33′S 160°18′W. A rock peak, 760 metres (2,490 ft) high, in the northeast part of Collins Ridge, at the confluence of Bowman and Amundsen Glaciers in the Queen Maud Mountains. Discovered and mapped by the Byrd Antarctic Expedition, 1928-30. Named by US-ACAN for Ronald E. Witalis, meteorologist, South Pole Station winter party, 1961.

=== Robinson Bluff ===
85°36′S 159°47′W. A bold rock bluff overlooking the west side of lower Amundsen Glacier, just north of Whitney Glacier, in the Queen Maud Mountains. Discovered in December 1929 by the Byrd Antarctic Expedition geological party under Laurence Gould. Named by US-ACAN for Richard R. Robinson, station engineer with the McMurdo Station winter party, 1966.

== Sources ==
- Alberts, Fred G., ed. (1995), Geographic Names of the Antarctic (PDF) (2 ed.), United States Board on Geographic Names This article incorporates public domain material from websites or documents of the United States Board on Geographic Names.
- Liv Glacier, USGS: United States Geological Survey
- Mount Goodale, USGS: United States Geological Survey
- Sailing Directions for Antarctica: Including the Off-Lying Islands South of Latitude 60 Degrees S. (2 ed.), United States. Hydrographic Office, 1960 This article incorporates public domain material from websites or documents of the United States Hydrographic Office.

This article incorporates public domain material from websites or documents of the United States Geological Survey.
