= Traugott Wilhelm Gevers =

Traugott Wilhelm Gevers (23 April 1900 – 19 August 1991) was a South African geologist who served as a professor of economic geology at the University of Witwatersrand. The mineral geversite is named in his honour. Mount Gevers in Antarctica is also named after him.

== Early life and education ==
Gevers was born in New Hanover, Natal, to missionary Heinrich Christoph Friedrich and Elisabeth Henriette Dorothee Auguste. He received a bachelor's degree in 1921 from the University of Cape Town after which he studied chemistry and received a masters in 1922 followed by studies at the Ludwig-Maximilians-Universität München leading to a doctorate in 1926.

== Career ==
After completing his doctorate Gevers joined the Geological Survey of South Africa and worked in Namibia. He also travelled widely to study geology. Based on this work he received an honorary doctorate from the University of Cape Town. He became chair of geology at the University of Witwatersrand in 1935 and pioneered the use of visual teaching aids for geology apart from field trips. He studied the Kivu and Kituro volcanos in the Congo. He visited Antarctica in 1965.

He had many adventurous accidents and narrow escapes from death, including falling from a glacier in Antarctica, contracting ailments in the field and suffering two broken legs when their vehicle was attacked by an angry elephant in the Congo in 1939. He was also member of numerous geological societies, receiving medals from the Belgian Geographical Society (1949), the Leopold von Buch plaque from the German Society for Geology (1959). The platinum mineral geversite was named in his honour by Eugen F. Stumpfl.
