= Dayle Friedman =

Rabbi Dayle A. Friedman is a pioneer in the development of a Jewish spiritual vision for aging, spiritual care and healing. She was the founding director of Hiddur: The Center for Aging and Judaism at the Reconstructionist Rabbinical College, which provided education, spiritual resources, and scholarship for elders and their caregivers.

She offers spiritual direction, spiritual accompaniment, help with decisions regarding medical choices and end of life, teaching, training and consulting through Growing Older, her Philadelphia-based, national practice. She was ordained by the Hebrew Union College-Jewish Institute of Religion in 1985. From 1985 until 1997 she was the founding director of chaplaincy services at the Philadelphia Geriatric Center.

== Selected works ==
- Jewish Wisdom for Growing Older: Finding Your Grit and Grace Beyond Midlife
- Jewish Visions for Aging: A Professional Guide for Fostering Wholeness, with Eugene B. Borowitz and Thomas R. Cole
- Jewish Pastoral Care: A Practical Handbook from Traditional and Contemporary Sources
- Jewish End-of-Life Care in a Virtual Age: Our Traditions Reimagined

== Awards and recognition ==
- 2008: Listed in 50 most influential American Jews compiled by The Forward
- 2010: Listed in 50 most influential American women rabbis in The Forward, Sisterhood
- 2010: Honorary Doctor of Divinity from the Hebrew Union College - Jewish Institute of Religion
- 2010: Honorary Doctor of Divinity from the Reconstructionist Rabbinical College
- 2011: Religion, Spirituality and Aging Award, American Society on Aging
