= Jabeur =

Jabeur, Arabic: جابر is a Tunisian surname. It is a form of Jaber. Notable people with the surname include:

- Ons Jabeur (born 1994), Tunisian tennis player
- Arbi Jabeur (born 1985), Tunisian football player
