= Sara Zeff Geber =

American writer

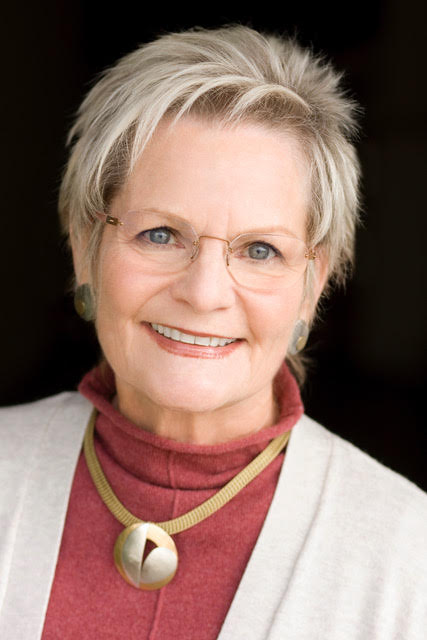
- Occupations: Author; professional speaker; journalist
- Known for: Solo aging advocacy
- Website: sarazeffgeber.com

Sara Zeff Geber is an American author, speaker, journalist, and originator of the term "solo aging". Her work focuses on raising awareness of the necessity of planning by older adults who are childless and/or aging alone.

== Education ==
Geber attended the University of Colorado for a year, followed by two years at the University of California, Davis. She later completed a Bachelor of Arts degree in psychology at West Chester University, followed by a masters of arts in guidance and counseling at Colorado University. She later received a PhD in counseling and human behavior at Golden Gate University.

== Career ==
=== News and media ===
Geber has provided her expertise on solo aging to various media outlets including The New York Times, PBS's Next Avenue, MarketWatch, and the Los Angeles Daily News. She is a contributor to the Forbes website as an expert on aging and retirement, and was named an "Influencer in Aging" by PBS Next Avenue.

Geber's book, Essential Retirement Planning for Solo Agers: A Retirement and Aging Roadmap for Single and Childless Adults, was included in Wall Street Journal's list of "Best Books of 2018 on Aging Well". It also won a Gold award from the Nonfiction Authors Association in January 2022.

=== Professional speaking ===
Geber has also been a guest on various podcasts, including Positive Aging, Senior Authority, Navigating Solo, and Glowing Older, where she offers financial guidance and lifestyle advice to solo agers.

Geber has spoken at numerous events, such as the 2023 Florida Conference on Aging, the American Society on Aging annual conference, and the NIC Fall Conference, discussing issues related to solo aging.

== Personal life ==
Geber was adopted as a baby and found her birth parents when she was almost 40. She grew up in Berkeley, California. She has been married twice and has no children. She and her second husband lost their home in the Tubbs Fire in 2017.

== Books ==
- Geber, Sara Zeff (2018). Essential Retirement Planning for Solo Agers: A Retirement and Aging Roadmap for Single and Childless Adults. Coral Gables, FL: Turner Publishing. ISBN 978-1-6335-3768-2.
- — (1996). How to Manage Stress for Success. New York, NY: AMACOM, American Management Association. ISBN 978-0-8144-7840-0.

== See also ==
- Voluntary childlessness
- Gerontology
