= Jaber (disambiguation) =

Jaber is an Arabic name for males used as a given name and surname.

Jaber or Al Jaber may also refer to:

- Jaber, Iran
- Jaber Castle (Qal'at Ja'bar), a castle in Syria
- Jaber Dam, a dam in Kukherd city, Iran
- Jaber Metro Station (Isfahan),
- Aqabat Jaber, a Palestinian refugee camp in the West Bank
- Al Jaber Aviation, an Emirati business jet airline
- Al Jabr, alias of British musician Richard H. Kirk

== See also ==
- Jabba (disambiguation)
- Jabir, a name
- Gaber (disambiguation)
- Al-jabr, which became "algebra", first mentioned in The Compendious Book on Calculation by Completion and Balancing
