= Jaba (given name) =

Jaba (Georgian: ჯაბა) is a Georgian masculine name. People with the name include:

- Jaba Bregvadze (born 1987), a Georgian rugby player
- Jaba Dvali (born 1985), a Georgian footballer
- Jaba Gelashvili (born 1993), a Georgian alpine skier
- Jaba Jighauri (born 1992), a Georgian footballer
- Jaba Kankava (born 1986), a Georgian footballer
- Jaba Lipartia (born 1987), a Georgian footballer
- Jaba Mujiri (born 1980), a Georgian footballer
- Jaba Ioseliani (1926–2003), a Georgian politician and paramilitary leader

== See also ==
- Jaba (disambiguation)
- Jabá, (Silvino João de Carvalho, born 1981), a Brazilian footballer
