= Nødtvedt Nunataks =

Nunataks in Ross Dependency, Antarctica

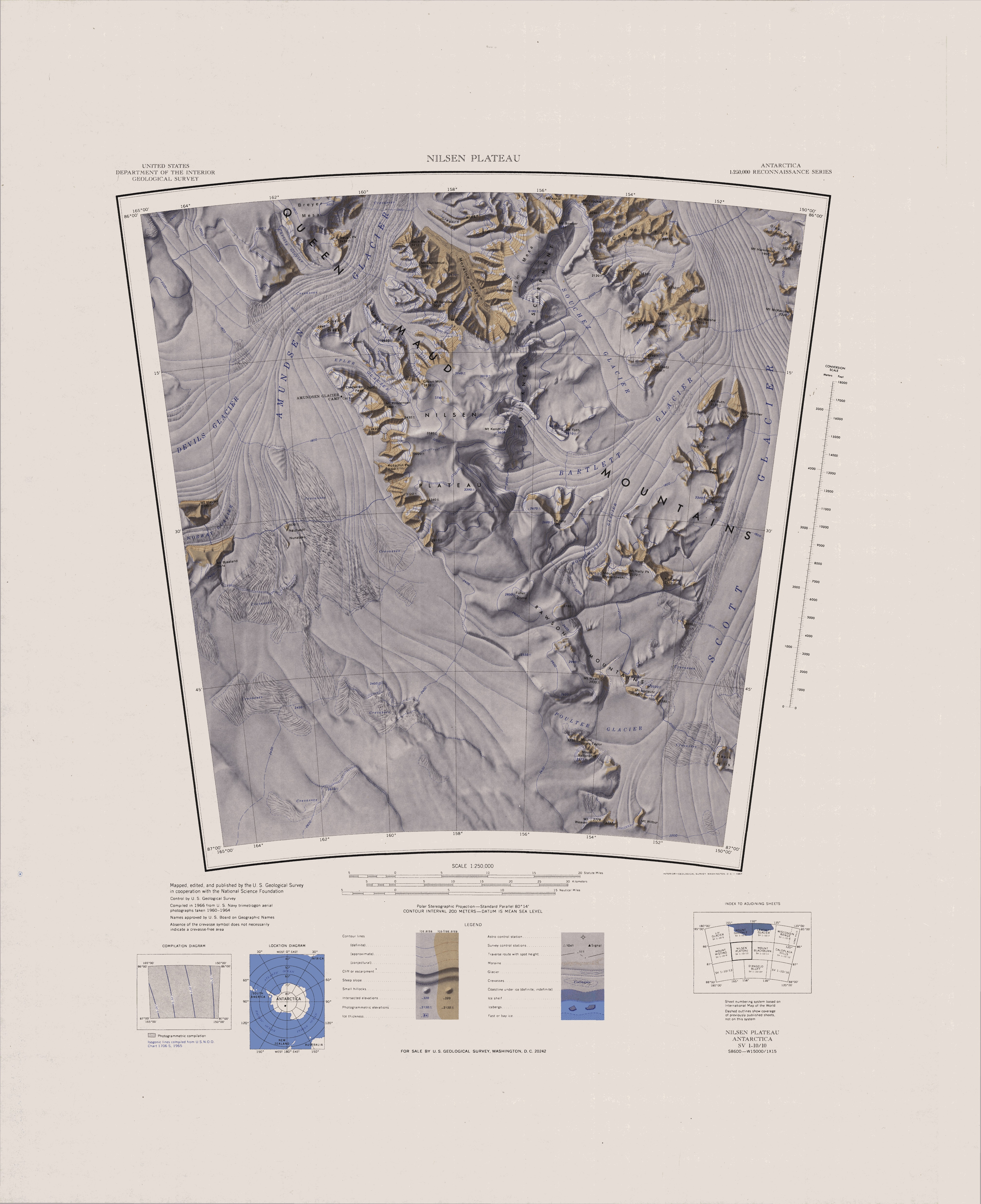

Nødtvedt Nunataks (86°32′S 162°18′W) is an isolated nunataks standing in mid-stream of the Amundsen Glacier, rising 7 nautical miles (13 km) east-northeast of Mount Bjaaland, Antarctica. Named by Advisory Committee on Antarctic Names (US-ACAN) for J. Nødtvedt, a member of the sea party of Amundsen's Norwegian expedition of 1910–12.
