= Nilsen Plateau =

Ice-covered plateau in Antarctica

- Location within Antarctica

Highest point
- Elevation: 3,938 m (12,920 ft)
- Prominence: 1,538 m (5,046 ft)
- Listing: Ultra; Ribu

Geography
- Continent: Antarctica
- Region: Ross Dependency
- Range coordinates: 86°20′S 158°0′W
- Parent range: Queen Maud Mountains

Nilsen Plateau (86°20′S 158°0′W) is a rugged, ice-covered plateau in Antarctica. When including Fram Mesa, the plateau is about 30 nautical miles (56 km; 35 mi) long and 1 to 12 nautical miles (1.9 to 22.2 km; 1.2 to 13.8 mi) wide, rising to 3,940 metres (12,930 ft) high between the upper reaches of the Amundsen and Scott glaciers, in the Queen Maud Mountains. Discovered in November 1911 by the Norwegian expedition under Roald Amundsen, and named by him for Captain Thorvald Nilsen, commander of the ship Fram.

== Location ==
The Nilsen Plateau lies to the east of the upper Amundsen Glacier and north of the Rawson Mountains. The Bartlett Glacier forms on its southeast side. The Faulkner Escarpment defines its east side. The Hays Mountains are to the north, separated from the plateau by the Cappellari Glacier. Features just to the south of these two glaciers include Mount Dort, Mount Clough and Simmonds Peak. South of these are Gregory Ridge, Mount Bowser.

The Nilsen Plateau proper includes Beck Peak, Mount Stubberud, Mount Sundbeck, Moraine Canyon and Fram Mesa. Further south again are Olsen Crags, Hansen Spur (south of Blackwall Glacier) and Crown Mountain. To the south of Epler Glacier are Lindstrom Peak, Mount Kristensen, Kutschin Peak and Mount Kendrick in the east.

== Northwestern features ==
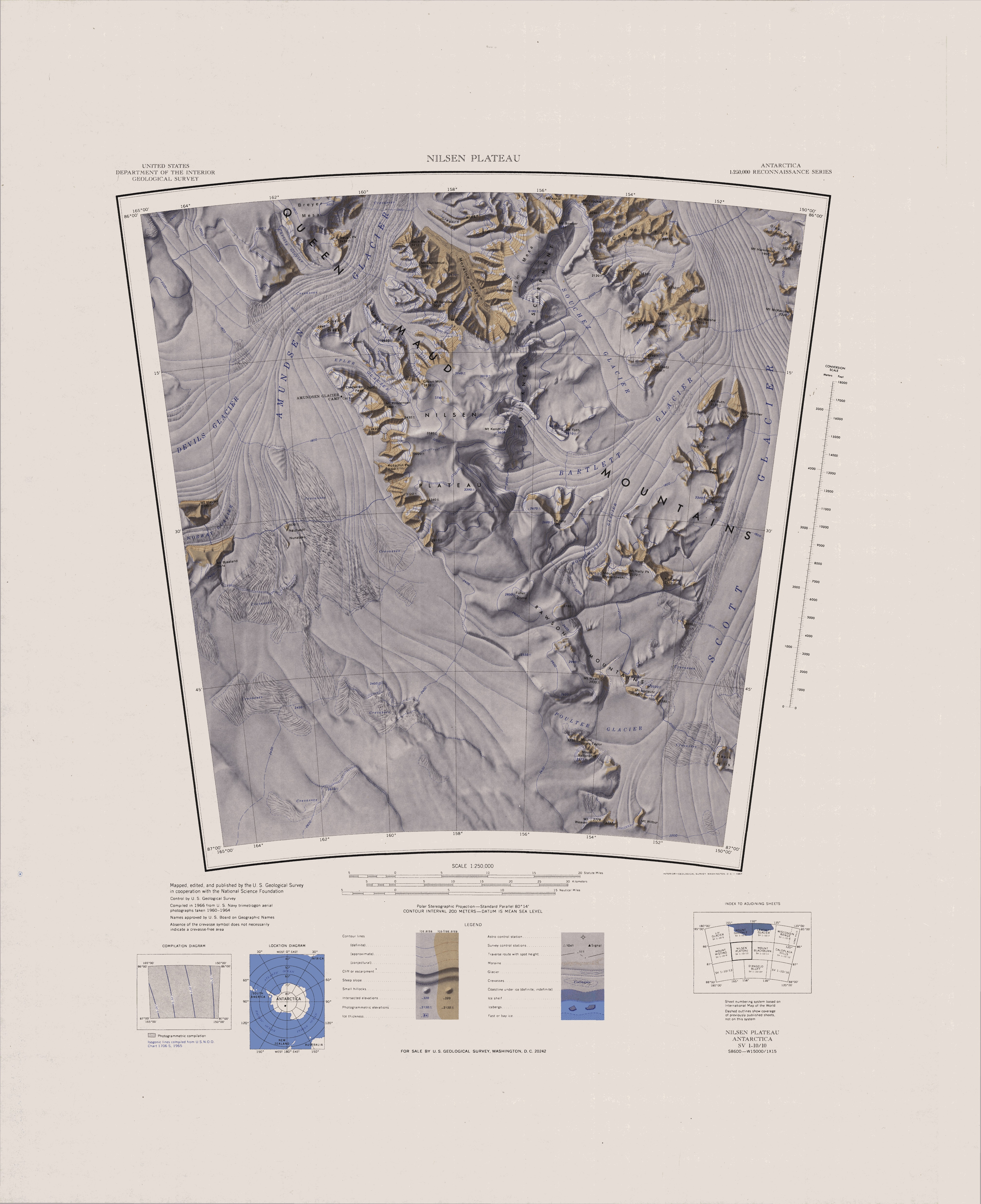
Nilsen Plateau in center of map

=== Beck Peak ===
86°05′S 158°58′W. A peak, 2,650 metres (8,690 ft) high, on the east flank of Amundsen Glacier, standing 2 nautical miles (3.7 km; 2.3 mi) northwest of Mount Stubberud on the ridge descending from northern Nilsen Plateau. This peak appears to have been first mapped from air and ground photos taken by the Byrd Antarctic Expedition, 1928-30. It was mapped in greater detail by the United States Geological Survey (USGS) from surveys andUnited States Navy air photos, 1960-64. Named by the United States Advisory Committee on Antarctic Names (US-ACAN) for A. Beck, a crew member on the Fram on Amundsen's Norwegian expedition of 1910-12. This naming preserves the spirit of Amundsen's 1911 commemoration of "Mount A. Beck," a name applied for an unidentifiable mountain in the general area.

=== Mount Stubberud ===
86°07′S 158°45′W. A mountain, 2,970 metres (9,740 ft) high, standing 2 nautical miles (3.7 km; 2.3 mi) southeast of Beck Peak on a ridge from the north side of Nilsen Plateau. Mapped by USGS from surveys andUnited States Navy air photos, 1960-64. Named by US-ACAN for Jorgen Stubberud, carpenter on the ship From and member of the land party at Framheim on Amundsen's expedition of 1910-12. This naming preserves the spirit of Amundsen's 1911 commemoration of "Mount J. Stubberud," a name applied for an unidentifiable mountain in the general area.

=== Mount Sundbeck ===
86°10′S 158°28′W. A peak, 3,030 metres (9,940 ft) high, standing 4 nautical miles (7.4 km; 4.6 mi) southeast of Mount Stubberud on a ridge from the north side of Nilsen Plateau. Mapped by USGS from the surveys andUnited States Navy air photos, 1960-64. Named by US-ACAN for Knut Sundbeck, engineer of the ship Fram on Amundsen's Norwegian expedition of 1910-12. This naming preserves the spirit of Amundsen's 1911 commemoration of "Mount K. Sundbeck," a name applied for an unidentifiable mountain in the general area.

=== Olsen Crags ===
86°12′S 160°48′W. Rugged crags surmounting a small but conspicuous mountain block that projects into the east side of Amundsen Glacier just north of Epler Glacier, in the Queen Maud Mountains. Mapped by USGS from surveys andUnited States Navy air photos, 1960-64. Named by US-ACAN for Karinius Olsen, cook on the From, the ship of Amundsen's Norwegian expedition of 1910-12. This naming preserves the spirit of Amundsen's 1911 commemoration of "Mount K. Olsen," a name applied for an unidentifiable mountain in the general area.

=== Hansen Spur ===
86°13′S 159°33′W. A spur, 8 nautical miles (15 km; 9.2 mi) long, descending from the northwest side of Nilsen Plateau and terminating at the edge of Amundsen Glacier just east of Olsen Crags. Mapped by USGS from surveys andUnited States Navy air photos, 1960-64. Named by US-ACAN for Ludvig Hansen, a member of the sea party aboard the Fram on Amundsen's Norwegian expedition of 1910-12. This naming preserves the spirit of Amundsen's 1911 commemoration of "Mount L. Hansen," a name applied for an unidentified mountain in the general area.

=== Crown Mountain ===
86°18′S 158°45′W. A mountain, 3,830 metres (12,570 ft) high, surmounting the west side of Nilsen Plateau, 4 nautical miles (7.4 km; 4.6 mi) east-northeast of Mount Kristensen. Mapped by USGS from surveys andUnited States Navy air photos, 1960-64. Named by US-ACAN to describe the appearance of the summit, a somewhat circular rock band contrasting with the ice surface of Nilsen Plateau.

== Fram Mesa and surroundings ==
=== Moraine Canyon ===
86°09′S 157°30′W. A canyon with very steep rock walls, 8 nautical miles (15 km; 9.2 mi) long, indenting northern Nilsen Plateau just west of Fram Mesa. Mapped by USGS from surveys andUnited States Navy air photos, 1960-64. So named by US-ACAN because the canyon floor is completely covered by glacial moraine.

=== Gregory Ridge ===
86°03′S 157°46′W. A narrow rock ridge descending westward from northern Fram Mesa and terminating at the east side of Amundsen Glacier. Mapped by USGS from surveys andUnited States Navy air photos, 1960-64. Named by US-ACAN for Lt. Cdr. N.B. Gregory, pilot on photographic flights duringUnited States Navy OpDFrz 1965.

=== Fram Mesa ===
86°08′S 156°28′W. A high, ice-capped mesa, 10 nautical miles (19 km; 12 mi) long and 1 to 3 nautical miles (1.9 to 5.6 km; 1.2 to 3.5 mi) wide, that forms the northeast portion of Nilsen Plateau. The feature may have been seen by Amundsen in 1911, and it was observed and partially mapped by the Byrd Antarctic Expedition of 1928-30 and 1933-35. It was mapped in detail by USGS from surveys andUnited States Navy air photos, 1960-64. Named by US-AC AN after the Fram, the ship used by Amundsen's expedition of 1910-12.

=== Faulkner Escarpment ===
86°12′S 156°00′W. An ice-covered escarpment, 30 nautical miles (56 km; 35 mi) long and over 3,000 metres (9,800 ft) high, trending in a north–south direction and forming the east edge of Nilsen Plateau and Fram Mesa. Discovered in December 1934 by the Byrd Antarctic Expedition geological party under Quin Blackburn, and named by Byrd for Charles J. Faulkner, Jr., chief counsel of Armour and Co. of Chicago, contributors to the expedition.

=== Mount Bowser ===
86°03′S 155°36′W. A prominent peak, 3,655 metres (11,991 ft) high, standing 2 nautical miles (3.7 km; 2.3 mi) south of Mount Astor at the north end of Fram Mesa. Mapped by USGS from surveys andUnited States Navy air photos, 1960-64. Named by US-ACAN for Carl J. Bowser, geologist at McMurdo Station, 1965-66 and 1966-67 seasons.

== Southern features ==
=== Lindstrøm Peak ===
86°18′S 160°10′W. A peak, 2,640 metres (8,660 ft) high, standing 2 nautical miles (3.7 km; 2.3 mi) northwest of Mount Kristensen on the west side of Nilsen Plateau. Named by US-ACAN for Adolf H. Lindstrøm, cook for the land party at Framheim on Amundsen's expedition of 1910-12. This naming preserves the spirit of Amundsen's commemoration of "Mount A. Lindstrøm," a name applied in 1911 for an unidentifiable mountain in the general area.

=== Mount Kristensen ===
86°20′S 159°40′W. A mountain, 3,460 metres (11,350 ft) high, standing on the west side of Nilsen Plateau 2 nautical miles (3.7 km; 2.3 mi) southeast of Lindstrøm Peak. Named by US-ACAN in 1967 for H. Kristensen, an engineer on the ship Fram on Amundsen's Norwegian expedition of 1910-12. This naming preserves Amundsen's commemoration of "Mount H. Kristensen," a name applied in 1911 for an unidentifiable mountain in the general area.

=== Roaring Cliffs ===
86°23′S 159°24′W. The high and precipitous rock cliffs just northward of Kutschin Peak on the west side of Nilsen Plateau. The name was proposed by William Long, geologist with a USARP field party that visited the area in the 1963-64 season. The name is descriptive of the sound made by the wind here; standing in the quiet, windless valley below, a roaring noise like an approaching train can be heard high up on the cliffs.

=== Kutschin Peak ===
86°25′S 159°42′W. A prominent peak 2,360 metres (7,740 ft) high, on the west slope of the Nilsen Plateau, standing 6 nautical miles (11 km; 6.9 mi) south of Mount Kristensen, at the east side of Amundsen Glacier. Named by US-ACAN for A. Kutschin, a member of the sea party of Amundsen's Norwegian expedition of 1910–12.

=== Crack Bluff ===
86°33′S 158°38′W. A bluff 8 nautical miles (15 km; 9.2 mi) southeast of Kutschin Peak on the west side of Nilsen Plateau. The bluff rises to 2,810 metres (9,220 ft) and has an extensive area of exposed rock. The name was proposed by Edmund Stump of the USARP Ohio State University field party which geologically mapped the bluff on Dec. 27, 1970. It is descriptive of the peculiar subhorizontal crack containing breccia fragments exposed on the steep southwest face.

=== Mount Kendrick ===
86°22′S 156°40′W. A massive ice-covered mountain, 3,610 metres (11,840 ft) high, surmounting the east side of the Nilsen Plateau at the head of Bartlett Glacier. Named by US-ACAN for Capt. H.E. Kendrick, Operations Officer on the staff of the Commander, United States Naval Support Force, Antarctica, in United States Navy Operation Deep Freeze 1967.

=== Mount Toth ===
86°22′S 155°15′W. The easternmost peak, 2,410 metres (7,910 ft) high, on the small ice-covered ridge 5 nautical miles (9.3 km; 5.8 mi) east of Mount Kendrick. Mapped by USGS from surveys and USN air photos, 1960–64. Named by US-ACAN for Commander Arpad J. Toth, USNR, operations officer in charge of Williams Field, McMurdo Sound, 1962–64.

=== Kranz Peak ===
86°31′S 155°24′W. A peak 2,680 metres (8,790 ft) high standing 6 nautical miles (11 km; 6.9 mi) northwest of Mount Przywitowski, between the heads of Holdsworth Glacier and Bartlett Glacier. Named by US-ACAN for Commander Arthur C. Kranz, staff meteorological officer, U.S. Naval Support Force, Antarctica, during USN Operation Deep Freeze 1966 and 1967.

== Features to the north ==
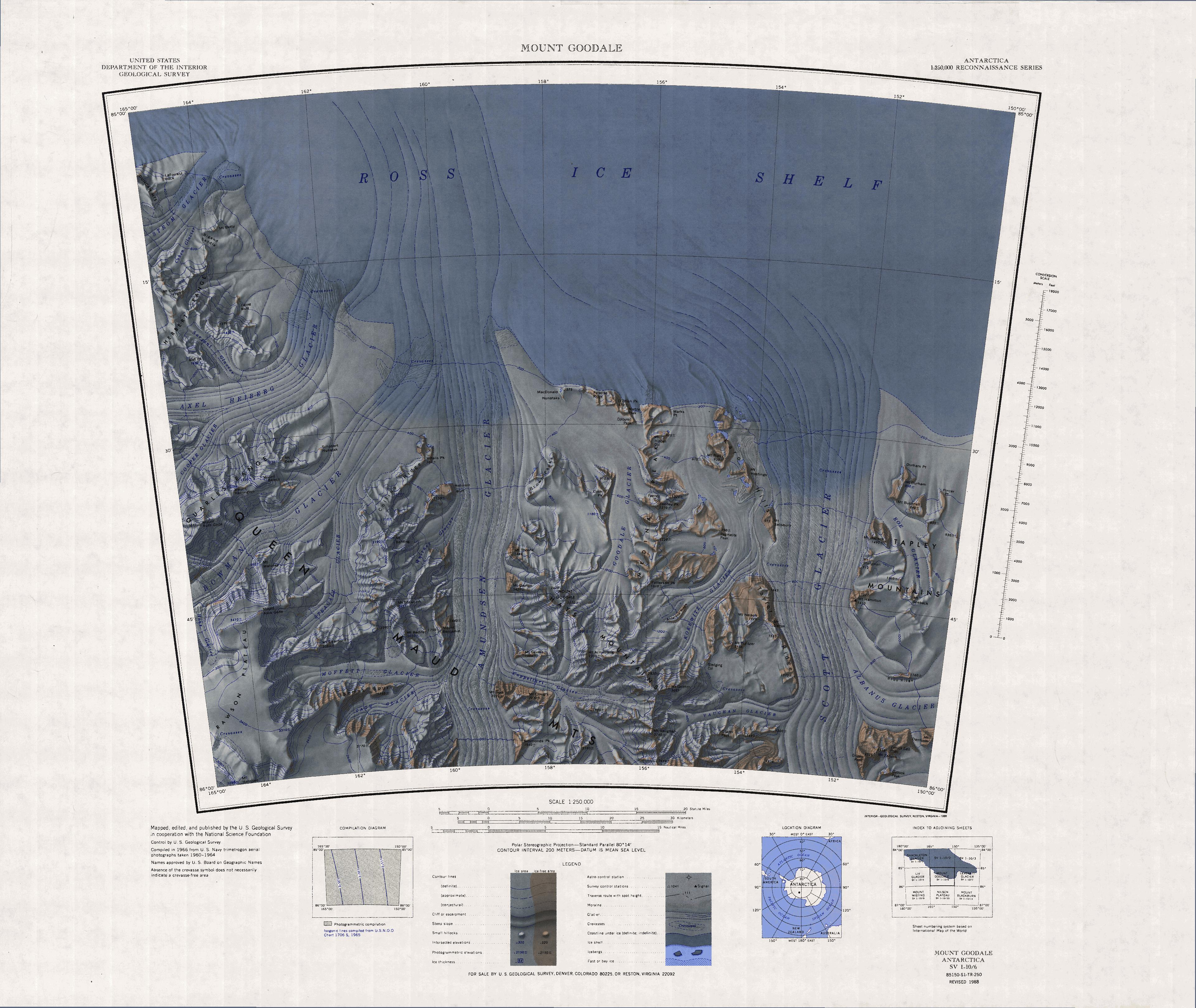
Northern end of Nilsen Plateau in south center of map

Features between the Hayes Mountains to the north and the Nilsen Plateau to the south include:

=== Mount Dort ===
85°54′S 158°53′W. Conspicuous ice-free mountain, 2,250 metres (7,380 ft) high, projecting into the east side of Amundsen Glacier just south of the mouth of Cappellari Glacier. Discovered and first mapped by the Byrd Antarctic Expedition, 1928-30. Named by US-ACAN for Wakefield Dort, Jr., geologist at McMurdo Station, summer 1965-66, and exchange scientist at the Japanese Showa Station, winter 1967.

=== Mount Clough ===
85°54′S 158°26′W. An ice-free mountain, 2,230 metres (7,320 ft) high, standing 2 nautical miles (3.7 km; 2.3 mi) east of Mount Dort, at the south side of Cappellari Glacier. Discovered and first mapped by the Byrd Antarctic Expedition, 1928-30. Named by US-ACAN for John W. Clough, geophysicist who participated in the South Pole-Queen Maud Land Traverse II, summer 1965-66.

=== Simmonds Peak ===
85°58′S 158°32′W. A prominent rock peak, 1,940 metres (6,360 ft) high, standing 4 nautical miles (7.4 km; 4.6 mi) south of Mount Dort on the east side of Amundsen Glacier, in the Queen Maud Mountains. Mapped by USGS from surveys andUnited States Navy air photos, 1960-64. Named by US-ACAN after Willard I. Simmonds, biologist, McMurdo Station winter party, 1964.

== Sources ==
- Alberts, Fred G., ed. (1995), Geographic Names of the Antarctic (PDF) (2 ed.), United States Board on Geographic Names This article incorporates public domain material from websites or documents of the United States Board on Geographic Names.
- Mount Goodale, USGS: United States Geological Survey
- Nilsen Plateau, USGS: United States Geological Survey
- This article incorporates public domain material from websites or documents of the United States Geological Survey.
