= Jabba =

Jabba or JABBA may refer to:

== People ==
- DJ Jabba (Steven Beckford), American DJ and event promoter
- Jabba (presenter) (Jason Davis, born 1973), Australian actor and media personality

== Other uses ==
- JABBA, the Japan Basketball Association
- Jabba, a language, also known as Hyam language
- Jabba the Hutt, a fictional character in the Star Wars franchise

== See also ==
- Jaba (disambiguation)
- Jabbar (disambiguation)
- Jaber (disambiguation)
- Jabbawockeez, an American hip-hop dance crew
- Jabirr Jabirr, an Indigenous Australian people, sometimes spelt Jabba Jabba
