= Jaber Alwan =

Italian artist and painter (born 1948)

Jaber Alwan (born 1948 in Babylon, Iraq) is an Italian artist and painter of Iraqi descent.

== Biography ==
Born in Babylon, Iraq, in 1948, Alwan graduated from the Institute of Fine Art in Baghdad in 1970. In 1972 he arrived in Rome and started painting in the famous Piazza Navona.

In 1975 he gained a diploma degree in Sculpture from the Rome Academy of Fine Art. Ten years later the Municipality of Rome awarded him the prize of Best Artist, the first foreigner to receive this prize.

He has works on permanent display in the Museums of Modern Art of Baghdad, Damascus, Qatar and Kuwait, the Opera House of Culture in Cairo, also at the Gulbenkian Museum, Lisbon, the Dei Diameni Palace, Ferrara, and the Academy Museum, Ravenna; and has private collections in many cities in Europe, Russia, Japan and Chile.

Alwan lives in Rome, Italy.

== Exhibitions ==
- 1975 “La Giada” Gallery Rome Italy
- 1976 “The Cross Library” Gallery Rome Italy
- 1977 “The Hall of Plastic Artists “ Gallery Baghdad Iraq
- 1978 “Studio Dell Arte” Gallery Rome Italy
- 1978 “Ipotesi” Gallery Rome Italy
- 1979 “La Perla” Gallery Florence Italy
- 1985 “Leonardo da Vinci” Gallery Rome Italy
- 1986 An Exhibition at his Studio Presented by “Giovanni Carandente” the Manager of Venice Penaly. Rome Italy
- 1987 “Il Leone” Gallery Rome Italy
- 1988 “Ornina” Gallery Damask Syria
- 1988 “Mass Palass” Museum Vienna Austria
- 1990 “Artemos” Gallery Bastogne Ballgame
- 1991 “Kufa” Gallery London England
- 1992 Liehrmann" Gallery Liege Ballgame
- 1993 Vittorio Caporrella" Foundation Rome Italy
- 1994 Liehrmann" Gallery Liege Ballgame
- 1994 “Lombardi” Gallery Rome Italy
- 1995 “Gallery Atassi” Damascus Syria
- 1995 Abaad" Gallery Amman Jordan
- 1995 “Sala” College Ronciglione Italy
- 1995 “Green Art” Gallery Dubai The Arabian Emarat
- 1995 “Communale” Gallery Founainebleau France
- 1996 “Liehrmann” gallery Liege Ballgame
- 1996 “Private Collection Art” Gallery Bahrain Bahrain
- 1997 “Museum Loggetta Lombardesca” Ravenna Italy
- 1997 Magazzino Del Sale" Cervia Italy
- 1998 “Green Art” Gallery Dubai The Arabian Emarat
- 1999 “Arte Contemporanea” gallery Foggia Italy
- 1999 “ Museum Civico Vieste” Vieste Italy
- 1999 “Atassi” Gallery Damascus Syria
- 1999 “Leonardo da Vinci” Gallery Catania Italy
- 2000 “Green Art” Gallery Dubai The Arabian Emarat
- 2000 “Al-Mada” Gallery Damascus Syria
- 2001 “XPO” gallery Beirut Lebanon
- 2001 “M-Art” Gallery Vienna Austria
- 2001 “Bilad Al Cham” gallery Halab Syria
- 2002 “Liehrmann” gallery Liege Ballgame
- 2002 “M-Art” Gallery Vienna Austria
- 2003 “Al-Mada” Gallery Beirut Lebanon
- 2004 “Grant” Gallery Cairo Egypt
- 2004 “Al-Marsa” Gallery Tunis Tunis
- 2005 “Museum of Art” Kuwait Kuwait
- 2005 “Liehrmann” Gallery Liege Ballgame
- 2005 “Al-Riwaq” Gallery Bahrain Bahrain
- 2005 “Green Art” Gallery Dubai The Arabian Emarat
- 2006 A solo exhibition at Dar Al Anda, Jordan

== Group exhibitions ==
- 1977 “Festival of International Art” Abbruzzo Italy
- 1977 “From Rome To Tokyo” Exhibition Japan
- 1981 “Iraqi Art” Rome Italy
- 1983 “Women in Iraq Art” Regge amilia Italy
- 1984 “Contemporary Iraqi Art” Brecht center, Milan Italy
- 1984 A group of Iraqi and Iranian Artists for Peace Rome Italy
- 1986 An Exhibition for a group of Italian and Foreign Artists Genezzano Italy
- 1986 “International Gallery” Rome Italy
- 1986 “Iraqi and Iranian Artists” Roma Italy
- 1987 “Salone del Quotidiano” Rome Italy
- 1987 “Anti Racial” Exhibition Rome Italy
- 1988 “Punto 8” Gallery Florence Italy
- 1988 “Iraqi Art” National Museum Damascus Syria
- 1988 “Far away from the first Sky” Florence Italy
- 1988 “Punto Gallery” Rome Italy
- 1989 “Mass Palass” Museum Vienna Austria
- 1989 “Palasso Valentine” Rome Italy
- 1990 “Biennale di Bastogne” Bastogne Ballgame
- 1993 “Il Torchio” Gallery Rome Italy
- 1993 “Mass Palass” Museum Vienna Austria
- 1995 “La Bottega” gallery Ravenna Italy
- 1996 “Communale” Museum “The Italian Art” Liege Ballgame
- 1997 Biennale di Rome “Palasso del Matto to “ Rome Italy
- 1999 Bienale di Beirut Beirut Lebanon
- 2003 Biennale di Cairo Cairo Egypt
- 2004 Biennale di Tunis Tunis Tunis
- 2005 “Adn- Kronos” Hall Rome Italy
