= Khalid Al-Jaber =

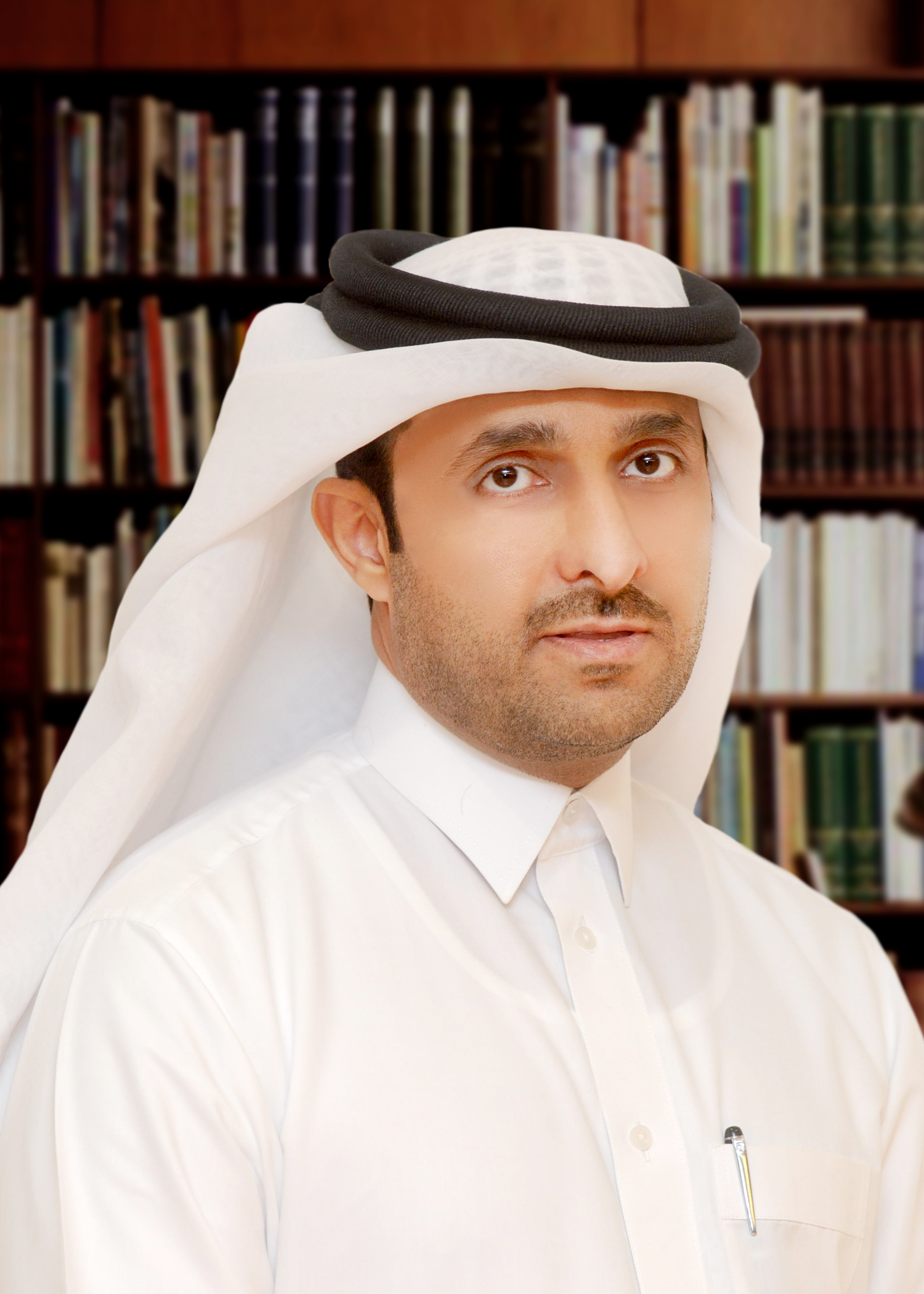
- Occupation: Assistant professor

Khalid J. Al-Jaber is an assistant professor of political communication at the Gulf Studies Program in Qatar University. He is also the editor-in-chief of the Peninsula newspaper published by Dar Al-Sharq Press, and works as principal at Global Media Consultants Organization in Atlanta, Georgia.

Al-Jaber is a scholar of Arab and Gulf studies and his research focuses on political science, public diplomacy, international communications, and international relations. He has published scholarly works in several academic and professional journals, including the World Press Encyclopedia and Gazette. Al-Jaber obtained his PhD in the UK and MA in the USA. He also holds postgraduate diplomas from Fordham University, Stanford University, and Georgetown University.

== Research interests ==
- Political communications and international relations
- Arab world, Middle East, North Africa, & U.S. foreign policy issues
- Political science and international affairs
- Public relations and public diplomacy studies
- Human development and human rights issues in the Arab world
- Mass media and communication technology in the GCC countries
- Cross-cultural and intercultural communication studies
- Distance learning and online teaching environments

== Publications ==
- Barrie Gunter, Mokhtar Elareshi, Khalid Al-Jaber (Eds) (2016). Social Media in the Arab world: Communication and Public Opinion in the Gulf States. London: I.B. Tauris.
- Dr. Khalid Al-Jaber (2015). Arabian Tweets.
- AL-Jaber. K., & Elareshi M. (2014). The Future of Media in the Arab world. Saarbrücken, Germany: LAP LAMBERT.
- AL-Jaber. K., & Al-Sayed K (2013). Arab Media in a Turbulent world. Doha :Al-Sharaq Publishing Ltd. Doha.
- AL-Jaber, K., & Gunter, B. (2012). Evolving the Role of News Systems in the Arabian Gulf Region. In Gunter, B. & Dickinson, R. (Eds). News Media in the Arab World. London: Bloomsbury Publishing Ltd.
- AL-Jaber, K., & Gunter, B. (2012). News Developments and Changes to News Consumption Patterns in the Arab World. In Gunter, B. & Dickinson, R. (Eds). News Media in the Arab World. London: Bloomsbury Publishing Ltd.
- Al-Jaber, K., Auter, P. J., & Arafa, M. (2005). Hungry for news and information: Instrumental use of Al-Jazeera TV among viewers in the Arab World and Arab Diaspora. Journal of Middle East Media, 1(1), 21–50.
- Al-Jaber, K., Auter, P. J., & Arafa, M. (2005). Identifying with Arabic journalists: How Al-Jazeera tapped parasocial interaction gratifications in the Arab World. Gazette, 67(2), 189–204.
- AL-Jaber, K. (2004). The Credibility of Arab Broadcasting: The Case of Al-Jazeera. Doha: National Council for Culture, Arts and Heritage.
- Al-Jaber, K., Auter, P. J., & Arafa, M. (2004). Who is the Aljazeera audience? Deconstructing the demographics and psychographics of an Arab satellite news network. Transnational Broadcasting Studies, 12.
- Al-Jaber, K., Auter, P. J., & Arafa, M. (2004). News credibility in the Arab World: An analysis of Arabic peoples’ usage patterns of Al-Jazeera after September 11, 2001, and before the Iraq War. Paper presented to the annual Global Fusion conference, St. Louis, MO.
- Al-Jaber, K., Auter, P. J., & Arafa, M. (2003, October). The credibility of Arabic journalists in the Arab World. Paper presented at the annual international convention of the Arab-US Association for Communication Educators (AUSACE), Dubai, United Arab Emirates.
- Al-Jaber, K., Auter, P. J., & Arafa, M. (2003, August). Instrumental vs. ritualized use of Arab satellite television. Paper presented to the International Communication Division at the national convention of the Association of Educations in Journalism and Mass Communication, Kansas City, MO.
- Al-Jaber, K., Auter, P. J., & Arafa, M. (2003, August). Audience perceptions of Al-Jazeera TV. In P. Auter (Chair), Al-Jazeera TV: What type of voice for the Arab World? Panel sponsored by the Radio TV Journalism Division at the national convention of the Association for Educators in Journalism and Mass Communication, Kansas City, MO.
- Al-Jaber, K., Auter, P. J., & Arafa, M. (2003, April). Parasocial interaction and Arabic people's use of Al-Jazeera TV: An exploratory analysis. First place debut paper presented to the International Division at the national convention of the Broadcast Education Association, Las Vegas, NV.
- Al-Jaber, K., Auter, P. J., & Arafa, M. (2003, April). Audience gratifications from and perceptions of credibility with Al-Jazeera TV and website. In D. Boyd (Chair), The Al-Jazeera media brand: The strategy of the Arab world's first Western style news organization and its effect on consumer communities in the Middle East and around the world. Panel co-sponsored by the International; News; and Management & Sales Divisions at the national convention of the Broadcast Education Association, Las Vegas, NV.
