= Jaber Abu Hussein =

Arabic poet and singer

- Born: 1913; Obbar el-Wagf, Sohag Governorate, Egypt
- Died: 1992 (aged 78–79)
- Genres: Folk
- Occupation: Singer
- Instrument: Rababa
- Labels: Taghribat Bani Hilal

Jaber Abu Hussein (Arabic: جابر أبو حسين; c. 1913–1992), an Arabic poet and singer of the Taghribat Bani Hilal (also known in the Middle East as Al Seera Al Hilaleyah ).

'Al Seera Al Hilaleya'
By Jaber Abu Hussein.

== See also ==
- In Arabic:Al Sira Al Hilaleya
