= Medina Peaks =

Mountain in Ross Dependency, Antarctica

- Location within Antarctica

Geography
- Continent: Antarctica
- Region: Ross Dependency
- Range coordinates: 85°36′S 155°54′W

The Medina Peaks (85°36′S 155°54′W) are rugged, mainly ice-free, peaks surmounting a ridge 15 nautical miles (28 km; 17 mi) long, extending north along the east side of Goodale Glacier to the edge of the Ross Ice Shelf, Antarctica.

== Discovery and naming ==
Some of the peaks were first seen and roughly mapped by the Byrd Antarctic Expedition, 1928–30. They were named by the Advisory Committee on Antarctic Names (US-ACAN) for Guillermo Medina, Technical Director of the U.S. Navy Hydrographic Office, 1954–60, and of the Naval Oceanographic Office, 1960–64.

== Location ==
The Medina Peaks lie between the Goodale Glacier to the west and the Koerwitz Glacier to the east, and extend up to the Ross Ice Shelf. From the south, features include Patterson Peak, Pegmatite Peak, Feeney Peak, Feeney Col and Hidden Col. Along the Ross Ice Shelf, from east to west, are Marks Point, Coloured Peak, Marble Peak, O'Brien Peak, Paradise Ridge and the MacDonald Nunataks.

== Features ==
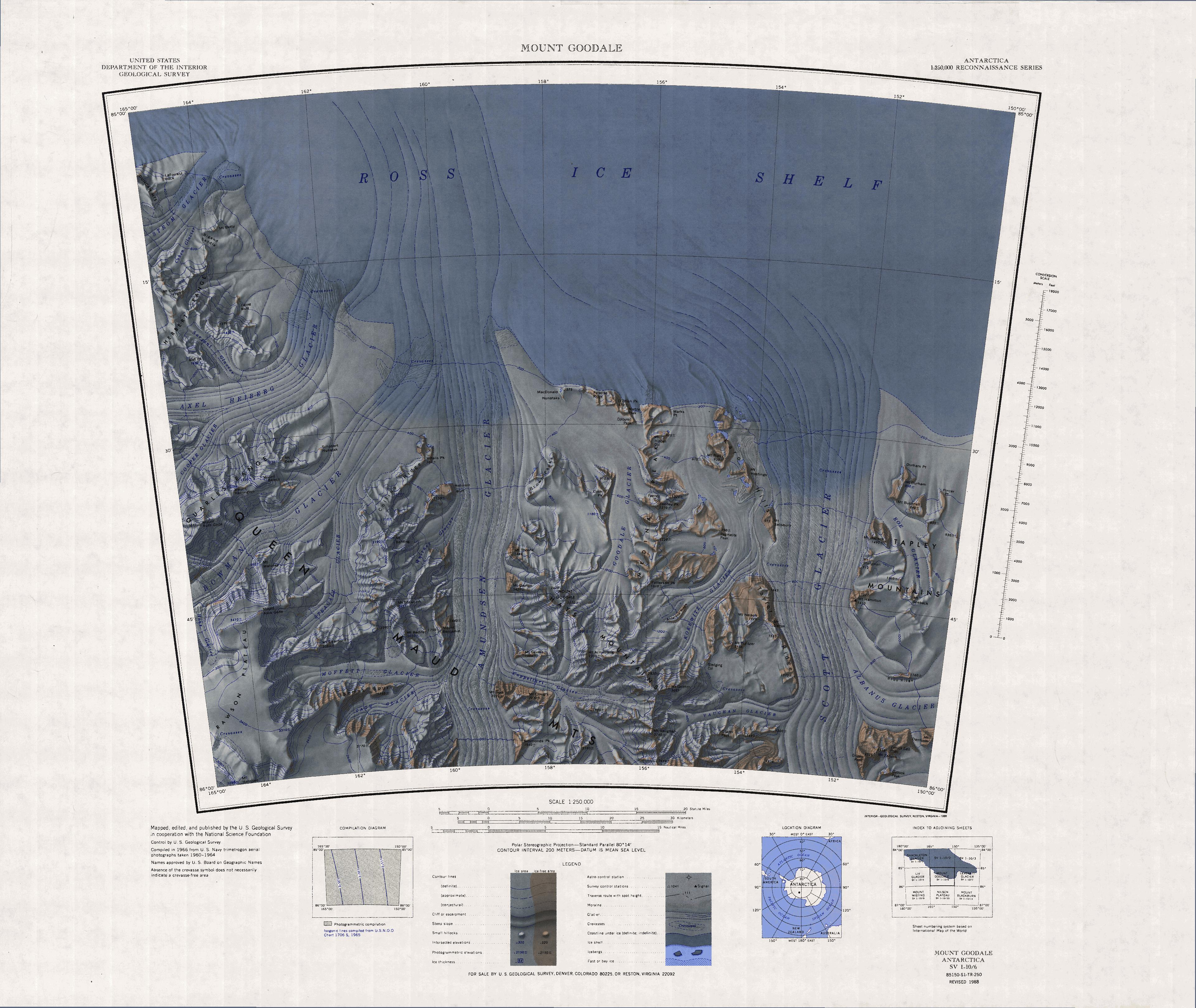
Medina Peaks in center of map

=== Patterson Peak ===
85°44′S 155°59′W. A peak, 1,610 metres (5,280 ft) high, standing at the south end of Medina Peaks, 4 nautical miles (7.4 km; 4.6 mi) northwest of Anderson Ridge. Mapped by United States Geological Survey (USGS) from ground surveys and United States Navy (USN) air photos, 1960-64. Named by United States Advisory Committee on Antarctic Names (US-ACAN) for Clair C. Patterson, glaciologist at Byrd Station, summer 1965-66.

=== Pegmatite Peak ===
85°39′S 154°39′W. A peak, 790 metres (2,590 ft) high, along the westside of Koerwitz Glacier, about midway between the main summits of Medina Peaks and Mount Salisbury. First mapped by the USGS from surveys and USN air photos, 1960-64. So named by New Zealand Geological Survey Antarctic Expedition (NZGSAE), 1969-70, because of the occurrence of large, whitish pegmatite dykes in a rock wall at the SE spur of the peak.

=== Feeney Peak ===
85°37′S 155°50′W. A peak, 1,210 metres (3,970 ft) high, near the center of Medina Peaks, standing 7 nautical miles (13 km; 8.1 mi) north of Patterson Peak on the E side of Goodale Glacier. Mapped by the USGS from ground surveys and USN air photos, 1960-64. Named by US-ACAN for Robert E. Feeney, biologist at McMurdo Station for several summers, 1964-65 to 1968-69.

=== Feeney Col ===
85°37′S 155°45′W. A col at the northeast side of Feeney Peak, near the center of Medina Peaks. Though steep on both sides and 970 metres (3,180 ft) high, the col provides a good route through Medina Peaks. Mapped by the USGS from surveys and USN air photos, 1960-64. The col was used by members of NZGSAE, 1969-70, who named it in association with Feeney Peak.

=== Hidden Col ===
85°32′S 156°00′W. A col in the north part of Medina Peaks, about 3.5 nautical miles (6.5 km; 4.0 mi) southwest of Marks Point, that allows a quick sledging route between the lower Amundsen and Scott Glaciers. Mapped by the USGS from surveys and USN air photos, 1960-64. The col was explored by NZGSAE, 1969-70, and so named because it is hidden behind ridges and spurs of the peaks to the northeast and southwest of it.

=== Marks Point ===
85°29′S 155°40′W. A rock point extending east from the north end of Medina Peaks, at the south edge of the Ross Ice Shelf. This feature and nearby area were first seen by members of the Byrd Antarctic Expedition, 1928-30. Named by US-ACAN for George R. Marks, logistics worker at McMurdo Station, winter party, 1962.

== Coastal features ==
Features that extend west along the coast from the northern end of the peaks are:

=== Coloured Peak ===
85°30′S 156°20′W. A peak, 660 metres (2,170 ft) high, near the head of Ross Ice Shelf in the coastal foothills of the Queen Maud Mountains, about 2 nautical miles (3.7 km; 2.3 mi) southeast of O'Brien Peak. Mapped by the USGS from surveys and U.S. Navy air photos, 1960-64. The peak was examined by members of NZGSAE, 1969-70, and so named because of the colorful yellow, pink and brown banded strata that mark the feature.

=== Marble Peak ===
85°29′S 156°28′W. A coastal peak, the twin of O'Brien Peak 2 nautical miles (3.7 km; 2.3 mi) to the southeast and almost the same height, overlooking the head of Ross Ice Shelf about midway between Amundsen and Scott Glaciers. The peak was mapped by USGS from surveys and U.S. Navy air photos, 1960-64. The name was applied by NZGSAE, 1969-70, because there are light-colored, whitish bands of marble crossing straight over its summit.

=== O'Brien Peak ===
85°28′S 156°42′W. A rock peak, 670 metres (2,200 ft) high, standing 3 nautical miles (5.6 km; 3.5 mi) west of the north extremity of Medina Peaks, along the edge of the Ross Ice Shelf. Discovered in December 1929 by the Byrd Antarctic Expedition geological party under Laurence Gould, and named by Byrd for John S. O'Brien, surveyor with that party.

=== Paradise Ridge ===
85°27′S 157°10′W. A low ridge that parallels the coast at the head of Ross Ice Shelf, located east of Amundsen Glacier and midway between MacDonald Nunataks and O'Brien Peak. Mapped by USGS from surveys and U.S. Navy air photos, 1960-64. So named by NZGSAE, 1969-70, because the ridge is rather flat on top and provides easy traversing.

=== MacDonald Nunataks ===
85°27′S 157°38′W. Two nunataks overlooking the head of the Ross Ice Shelf, standing just east of the terminus of Amundsen Glacier, 5 nautical miles (9.3 km; 5.8 mi) west of O'Brien Peak. Mapped by USGS from surveys and USN air photos, 1960-64. Named by US-ACAN for John A. MacDonald, biologist, McMurdo Station winter party, 1964.

== Sources ==
- Alberts, Fred G., ed. (1995), Geographic Names of the Antarctic (PDF) (2 ed.), United States Board on Geographic Names This article incorporates public domain material from websites or documents of the United States Board on Geographic Names.
- Mount Goodale, USGS: United States Geological Survey

This article incorporates public domain material from websites or documents of the United States Geological Survey.
