= Gever, Netherlands =

Gever
- Hamlet
- Location in the province of North Brabant in the Netherlands Gever (Netherlands)
- Coordinates: 51.59289°N 5.22386°E
- Country: Netherlands
- Province: North Brabant
- Municipality: Oisterwijk

Area
  - Total: 8.31 km^{2} (3.21 sq mi)
- Time zone: UTC+1 (CET)
  - Summer (DST): UTC+2 (CEST)
- Postal code: 5076
- Dialing code: 0411

Gever is a hamlet in the Dutch province of North Brabant. It is located in the municipality of Oisterwijk, between the towns of Haaren and Oisterwijk.

Gever is not a statistical entity, and the postal authorities have placed it under Haaren. It has no place name signs, and consists of about 30 houses.

It was first mentioned in 1311 as Godevaard van de Gever. The etymology is unclear.
