= Jabir =

Jabir (Arabic: جابر pronounced [ˈd͡ʒaːbɪr]) is an Arabic surname or male given name, which means "comforter". Alternative spellings include Djābir, Jaber, Jābir, Gabir, and Geber. The name may refer to:

== Given name ==
- Jaber I Al-Sabah (1770–1859), Kuwaiti political leader
- Jabir Al-Azmi (born 1970), Kuwaiti politician
- Jabir al-Kaabi (1789–1881), Arabian political leader
- Jabir al-Sabah (1926–2006), Emir of Kuwait
- Jabir Herbert Muhammad (1929–2008), American businessman
- Jabir Husain (born 1945), Indian politician
- Jabir ibn Abd Allah (607–697), Arab companion of Muhammad
- Jabir ibn Aflah (1100–1150), Spanish-Arab astronomer
- Jābir ibn Hayyan (died c. 806–816), early Islamic alchemist
- Jābir ibn Zayd (died 711), Arab theologian
- Jabir Novruz (1933–2002), Azerbaijani writer
- Jabir Raza (born 1955), Indian historian
- Djabir Saïd-Guerni (born 1977), Algerian athlete
- Jabir Shakir (born 1987), Iraqi football player
- Sultan Djabir (c. 1855–1918), ruler of a region on the Uele River in what is now the Democratic Republic of the Congo.

== Surname ==
- Balla Jabir (born 1985), Sudanese football player
- Fathi Jabir (born 1980), Yemeni football player
- Malik Jabir (born 1944), Ghanaian football player

== See also ==
- Arabic name
- Geber (disambiguation)
- Jaber
