= Hays Mountains =

Group of mountains and peaks of the Queen Maud Mountains of Antarctica

- Location within Antarctica

Geography
- Continent: Antarctica
- Region: Ross Dependency
- Range coordinates: 86°S 155°W
- Parent range: Queen Maud Mountains

The Hays Mountains (86°S 155°W) are a large group of mountains and peaks of the Queen Maud Mountains of Antarctica, surmounting the divide between the lower portions of Amundsen Glacier and Scott Glacier and extending from the vicinity of Mount Thorne on the northwest to Mount Dietz on the southeast.

== Discovery and naming ==
The Hays Mountains were discovered by Rear Admiral Richard E. Byrd on the South Pole flight of November 28–29, 1929, and mapped in part by the Byrd Antarctic Expedition geological parties to this area in 1929 and 1934. They were named by Byrd for Will H. Hays, former head of the Motion Picture Producers and Distributors of America.

== Location ==
The Hays Mountains extend between the Amundsen Glacier to the west and Scott Glacier to the east. Peaks from south to north along the east side of the Amundsen Glacier include Simmonds Peak, Mount Dort, Mount Clough to the south of Cappellari Glacier and Mount Gevers to the north of that glacier, Mount Dayton, Mount Thorne, Cook Peak and the Brown Peaks. Peaks in the center of the range include Mount Goodale, Mount Armstrong, Mount Griffith and Mount Vaughan above the Vaughan Glacier. East of Mount Vaughan are the Sledging Col, Mount Pulitzer, Mount Nelson and Mount Sletten on the Taylor Ridge, which extends along the Scott Glacier to the east. Mount Astor, Mount Crockett, the Cox Peaks, Mount Borcik, Mount Walshe and Mount Dietz are in the southeast of the range. To the south of the Hays Mountains are the Nilsen Plateau, Fram Mesa and Faulkner Escarpment.

== Western features ==
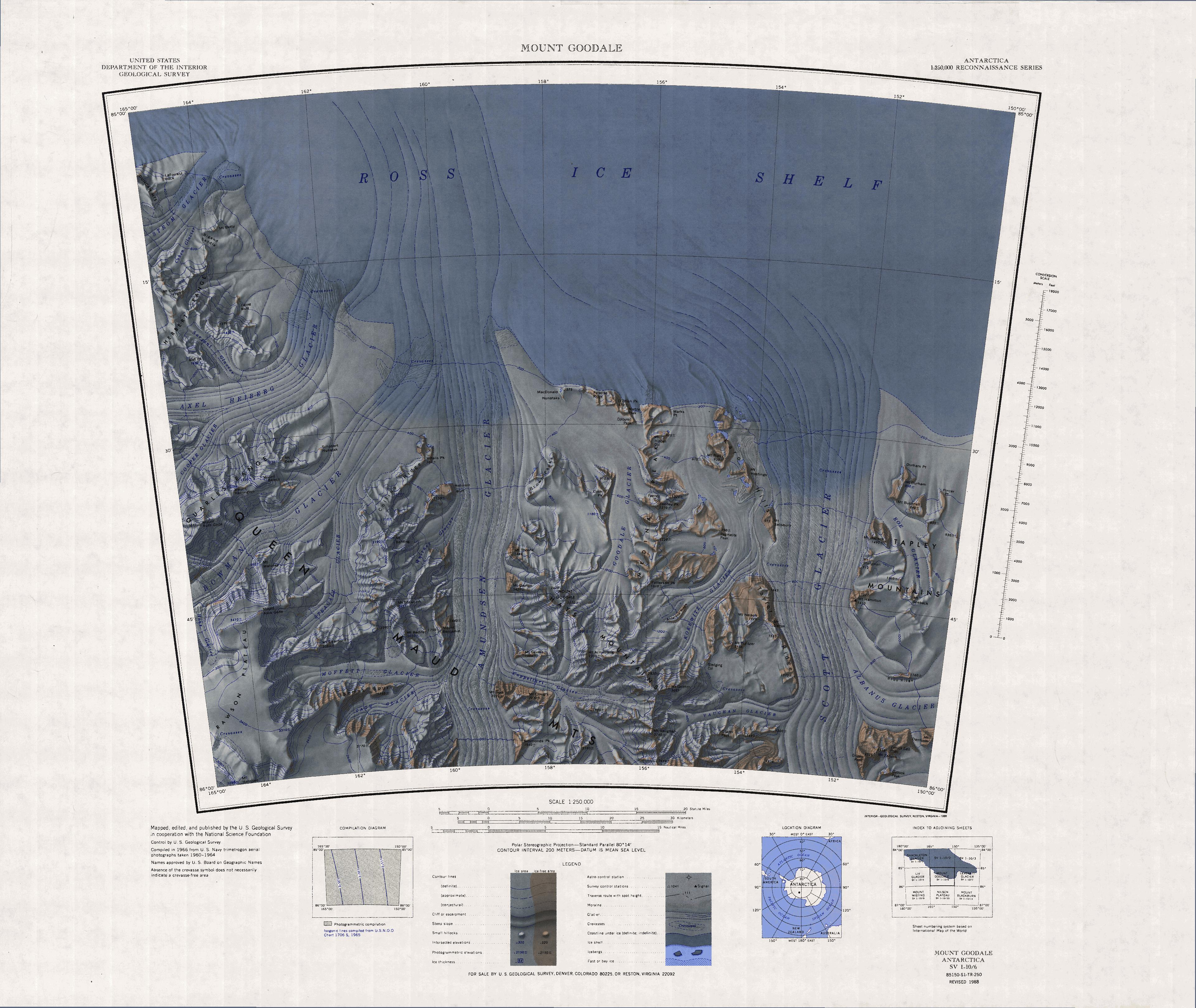
Hays Mountains in south center of map

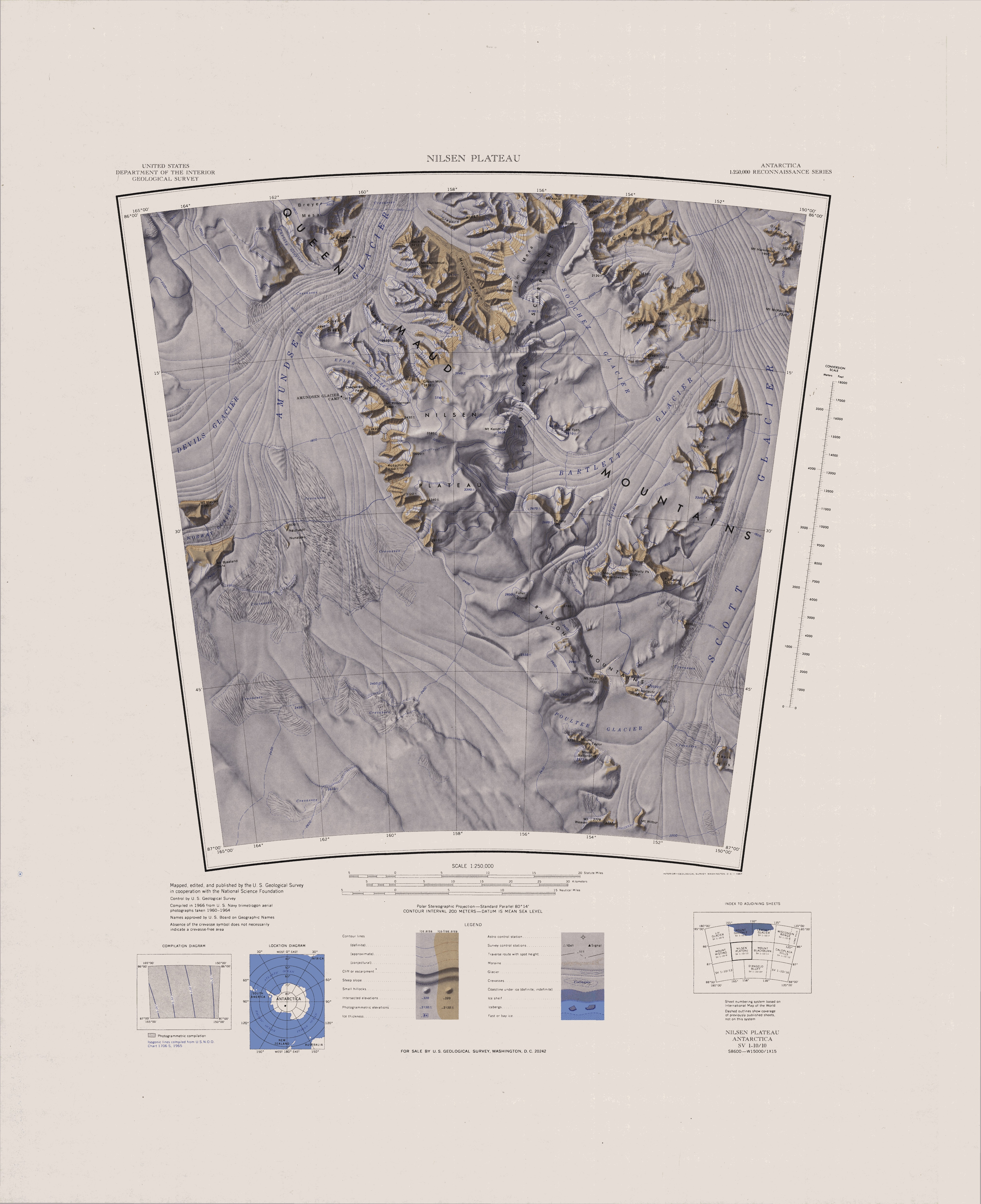
Southern Hays Mountains in north center of map

Features along the east side of the Amundsen Glacier include, from south to north,

=== Mount Gevers ===
85°50′S 158°29′W. A rock peak, 1,480 metres (4,860 ft) high, in the Hays Mountains, standing at the north side of Cappellari Glacier at the point where it enters Amundsen Glacier. Mapped by United States Geological Survey (USGS) from surveys and United States Navy (USN) air photos, 1960–64. Named by the United States Advisory Committee on Antarctic Names (US-ACAN) for T.W. Gevers of the University of the Witwatersrand (Johannesburg), geologist at McMurdo Station in 1964–65.

=== Mount Dayton ===
85°44′S 158°41′W. A mainly ice-free mountain, 1,420 metres (4,660 ft) high, at the east side of Amundsen Glacier, standing 5 nautical miles (9.3 km; 5.8 mi) west of Mount Goodale. Mapped from ground surveys and air photos by the Byrd Antarctic Expedition, 1928–30. Named by US-ACAN for Paul K. Dayton III, biologist with the McMurdo Station winter party of 1964.

=== Mount Thorne ===
85°41′S 158°40′W. A prominent peak, 1,465 metres (4,806 ft) high, rising on the east flank of Amundsen Glacier, 6 nautical miles (11 km; 6.9 mi) northwest of Mount Goodale. Discovered in December 1929 by the Byrd Antarctic Expedition geological party under Laurence Gould, and named for George A. Thorne, topographer and dog driver with that party.

=== Cook Peak ===
85°36′S 156°50′W. A rock peak 4.5 nautical miles (8.3 km; 5.2 mi) west of Feeney Peak, surmounting the west wall of Goodale Glacier in the foothills of the Queen Maud Mountains. Mapped by USGS from ground surveys and USN air photos, 1960–64. Named by US-ACAN for David L. Cook, logistics assistant with the McMurdo Station winter party of 1965.

=== Brown Peaks ===
85°35′S 158°05′W. A series of low peaks surmounting a ridge 4 nautical miles (7.4 km; 4.6 mi) long, standing 7 nautical miles (13 km; 8.1 mi) east of Robinson Bluff at the east side of Amundsen Glacier. First roughly mapped from ground surveys and air photos by the Byrd Antarctic Expedition, 1928–30. Named by US-ACAN for Kenneth R. Brown, biologist with the McMurdo Station winter party of 1964.

== Central features ==
Features of the center of the range include:

=== Mount Goodale ===
85°45′S 157°43′W. A mountain with double summits, 2,420 metres (7,940 ft) high and 2,570 metres (8,430 ft) high, standing 6 nautical miles (11 km; 6.9 mi) southeast of Mount Thorne. Discovered in December 1929 by the Byrd Antarctic Expedition geological party under Laurence Gould, and named by Byrd after Edward E. Goodale, a member of that party. From 1959 to 1968 Goodale served as United States Antarctic Research Program (USARP) Representative in Christchurch, New Zealand, and facilitated the passage of thousands of researchers to Antarctica and return.

=== Mount Armstrong ===
85°50′S 157°12′W. Mountain, 2,330 metres (7,640 ft) high, standing 5 nautical miles (9.3 km; 5.8 mi) south-southeast of Mount Goodale. Mapped by USGS from ground surveys and USN air photos, 1960–64. Named by US-ACAN for Thomas B. Armstrong, USARP representative at Palmer Station, summer 1966–67.

=== Mount Griffith ===
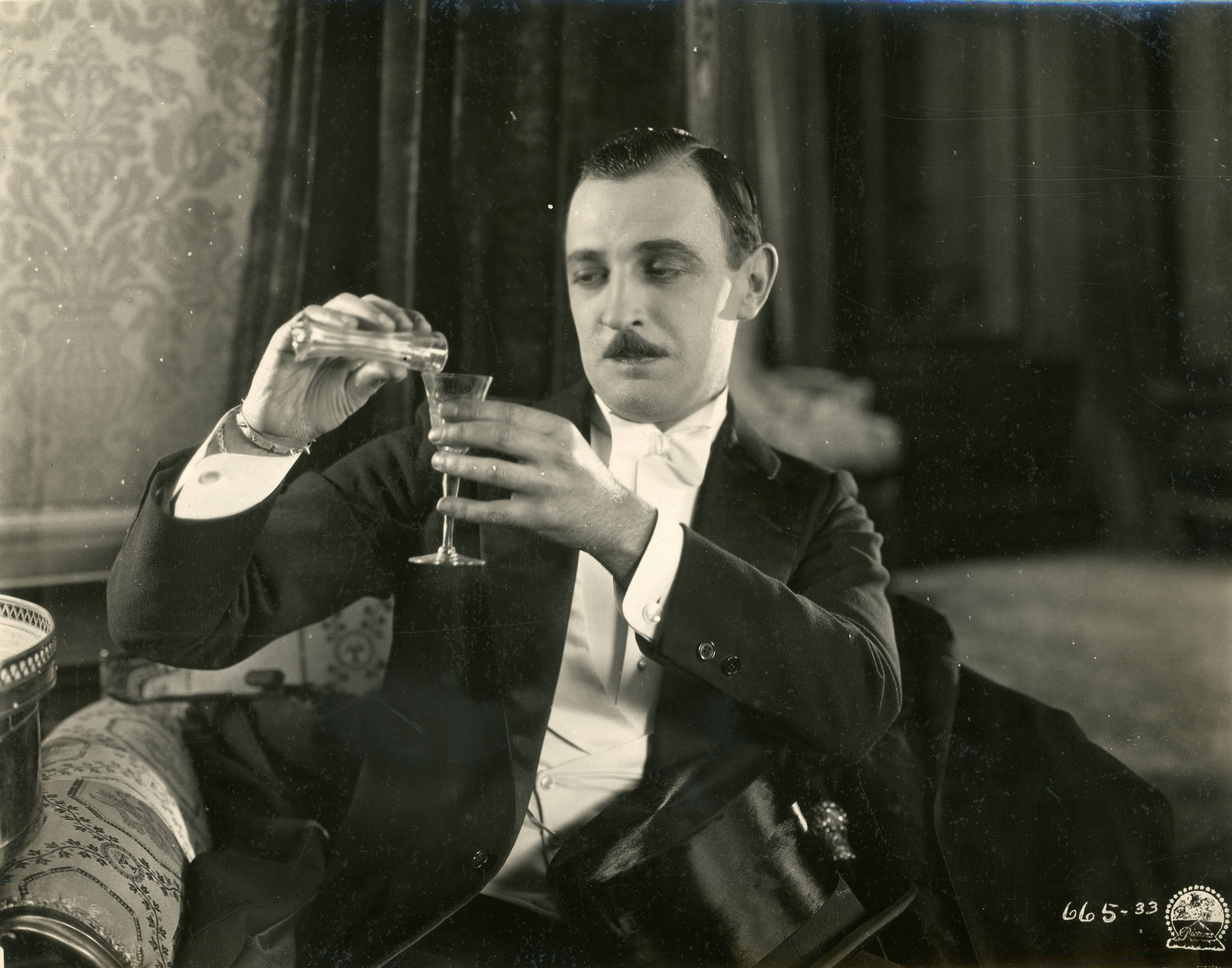
Silent films actor Raymond Griffith

85°53′S 155°30′W. A massive mountain, 3,095 metres (10,154 ft) high, standing 4 nautical miles (7.4 km; 4.6 mi) north-northeast of Mount Vaughan. First observed and roughly mapped in December 1929 by the Byrd Antarctic Expedition geological party under Laurence Gould. Remapped in December 1934 by the Byrd Antarctic Expedition geological party under Quin Blackburn, and named by Byrd for Raymond Griffith, of Twentieth Century-Fox Pictures, who assisted in assembling motion picture records of the expedition.

=== Fission Wall ===
85°52′S 155°12′W. A 1,400 metres (4,600 ft) high granite cliff on the north face of Mount Griffith. The feature was climbed on Nov. 16, 1987, by a USARP-Arizona State University geological party led by Edmund Stump. The name derives from granite samples collected on the wall at 100 metres (330 ft) high spacing for dating by the fission-track method.

=== Mount Vaughan ===
85°57′S 155°50′W. A prominent peak, 3,140 metres (10,300 ft) high, standing 4 nautical miles (7.4 km; 4.6 mi) south-southwest of Mount Griffith on the ridge at the head of Vaughan Glacier. Named for Norman D. Vaughan, dog driver with the Byrd Antarctic Expedition geological party under Laurence Gould which explored the mountains in this vicinity in December 1929. The map resulting from the Byrd Antarctic Expedition, 1928–30, applied the name Mount Vaughan to the southern portion of Mount Goodale, but the US-ACAN has modified the original naming to apply to this larger peak which lies 15 nautical miles (28 km; 17 mi) southeastward.

=== Citadel Peak ===
85°57′S 154°27′W. A peak of volcanic rock along the south side of Vaughan Glacier, 6 nautical miles (11 km; 6.9 mi) east of Mount Vaughan, in the Queen Maud Mountains. Mapped by USGS from surveys and U.S. Navy air photos, 1960–64. So named by New Zealand Geological Survey Antarctic Expedition 1969–70; the summit is composed of vertical rock slabs, its strange appearance being reminiscent of a castle or citadel.

=== Forbidden Valley ===
85°59′S 154°00′W. A valley to the south of Citadel Peak. The valley drains east-northeast from Mount Crockett to Scott Glacier and is partly covered by glacier and moraine. It was visited in December 1987 by a USARP-Arizona State University geological party led by Edmund Stump. The mouth of the valley is blocked by a moraine which denies easy access, hence the name.

== Eastern features ==
Features to the east include:

=== Sledging Col ===
85°51′S 154°48′W. A col between Mount Griffith and a very low peak on its northeast side, in the Hays Mountains. The col provides a sledging route from Scott Glacier to the head of Koerwitz Glacier and thence northward. So named by members of New Zealand Geological Survey Antarctic Expedition who used this route in 1969-70 when the west side of the lower reaches of Scott Glacier were found to be impassable.

=== Dragons Lair Névé ===
85°51′S 154°00′W A névé of about 25 square nautical miles (86 km^{2}; 33 sq mi) from surveys and USN aerial photographs, 1960–64. During November 1987, the névé was the camp site of the USARP-Arizona State University geological party, which suggested the name. The name derives from the setting, surrounded by peaks, and from the appearance of Mount Pulitzer, the profile of which is remindful of a dragon.

=== Mount Pulitzer ===
85°49′S 154°16′W. A prominent mountain, 2,155 metres (7,070 ft) high, standing 7 nautical miles (13 km; 8.1 mi) northeast of Mount Griffith on the elevated platform between Koerwitz and Vaughan Glaciers. Discovered in December 1934 by the Byrd Antarctic Expedition geological party under Quin Blackburn, and named by Byrd for Joseph Pulitzer, (Note: Joseph Pulitzer was son of the more famous Joseph Pulitzer, founder of the St. Louis Post-Dispatch) publisher of the St. Louis Post-Dispatch, a patron of the Byrd Antarctic Expedition of 1928-30 and 1933–35.

=== Anderson Ridge ===
85°47′S 155°24′W. A ridge 2 nautical miles (3.7 km; 2.3 mi) long, rising above the middle of the head of Koerwitz Glacier. Mapped by USGS from ground surveys. and USN air photos, 1960–64. Named by US-ACAN for Arthur J. Anderson, meteorologist with the South Pole Station winter party, 1960.

=== Mount Nelson ===
85°47′S 153°48′W. A mountain, 1,930 metres (6,330 ft) high, standing 3 nautical miles (5.6 km; 3.5 mi) northeast of Mount Pulitzer, near the west side of Scott Glacier. First mapped by the Byrd Antarctic Expedition, 1933–35. Named by US-ACAN for Randy L. Nelson, who made satellite geodesy studies at McMurdo Station, winter party 1965.

=== Mount Sletten ===
85°47′S 153°30′W. A conspicuous rock peak surmounting Taylor Ridge on the west side of Scott Glacier, 4 nautical miles (7.4 km; 4.6 mi) northeast of Mount Pulitzer. Discovered and roughly mapped by the Byrd Antarctic Expedition, 1928–30. Named by US-ACAN for Robert S. Sletten who made studies in satellite geodesy at McMurdo Station in 1965.

=== Taylor Ridge ===
85°48′S 153°21′W. A rock ridge, 10 nautical miles (19 km; 12 mi) long, forming a precipitous wall along the west side of Scott Glacier between the mouths of Koerwitz and Vaughan Glaciers. Discovered by the Byrd Antarctic Expedition geological party under Quin Blackburn in 1934. Named by US-ACAN for John H. Taylor, ionospheric physicist with the South Pole Station winter party, 1966.

== Southern features ==
=== Mount Astor ===
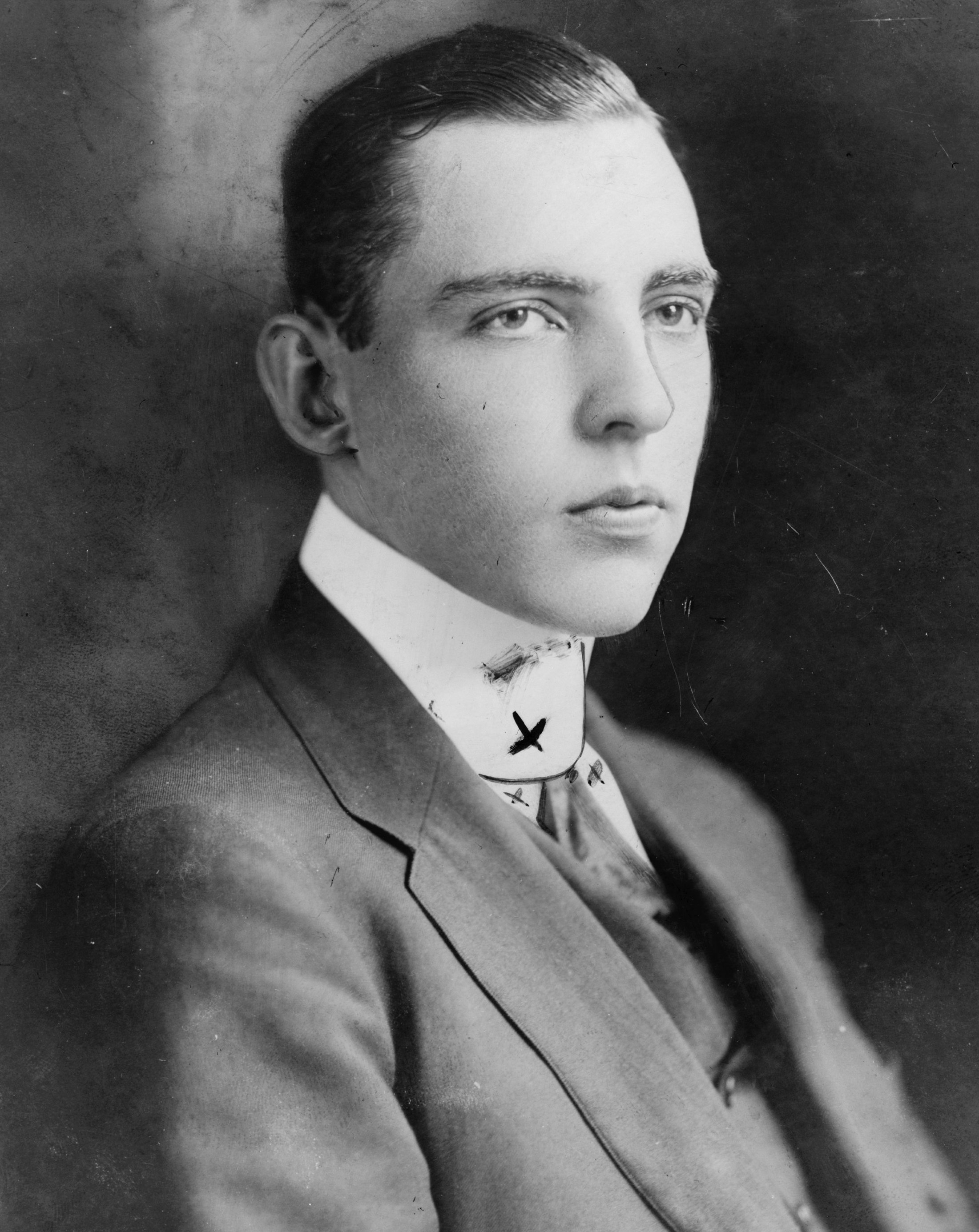
Vincent Astor

86°01′S 155°30′W. A prominent peak, 3,710 metres (12,170 ft) high, standing 2 nautical miles (3.7 km; 2.3 mi) north of Mount Bowser in the Hays Mountains of the Queen Maud Mountains. Discovered by R. Admiral Byrd on the Byrd Antarctic Expedition flight of November 1929 to the South Pole, and named by him for Vincent Astor, contributor to the expedition.

=== Heinous Peak ===
85°59′S 154°55′W. A prominent peak rising to c. 3,300 metres (10,800 ft) high, 1 nautical mile (1.9 km; 1.2 mi) north-northeast of Mount Crockett and 6 nautical miles (11 km; 6.9 mi) southeast of Mount Vaughan in the Hays Mountains. The peak was climbed on Nov. 28, 1987, by four members of the US ARP-Arizona State University geological party led by Edmund Stump. So named because the ascent was a 20-hour ordeal in technical ice climbing on very steep terrain.

=== Mount Crockett ===
86°01′S 155°04′W. A prominent peak, 3,470 metres (11,380 ft) high, standing 2 nautical miles (3.7 km; 2.3 mi) east of Mount Astor in the Hays Mountains. Discovered by members of the geological party under Laurence Gould during the Byrd Antarctic Expedition, 1928–30, and named by Byrd for Frederick E. Crockett, a member of that party. The application of this name has been shifted in accord with the position assigned on the maps resulting from the second Byrd Antarctic Expedition of 1933–35.

=== Mount Stump ===
86°11′S 153°10′W. A mostly ice-free mountain rising to 2,490 metres (8,170 ft) high, located 1 nautical mile (1.9 km; 1.2 mi) north-northeast of Mount Colbert and 2 nautical miles (3.7 km; 2.3 mi) northeast of Mount Borcik in the southeast part of Hays Mountains. Mapped by USGS from surveys and USN aerial photographs, 1960–64. Named by US-ACAN in association with Mount Colbert after Edmund Stump, geologist, Arizona State University; USARP geological investigator at lower Shackleton Glacier (1970–71), Duncan Mountains (1974–75), Leverett Glacier (1977–78), Scott Glacier and Byrd Glacier (1978–79), and La Gorce Mountains (1980–81); Chief Scientist, International Northern Victoria Land Project (1981–82); additional investigations, McMurdo Dry Valleys, January 1983; Nimrod Glacier area, 1985–86.

=== Mount Colbert ===
86°12′S 153°13′W. A mountain rising to 2,580 metres (8,460 ft) high, 1.5 nautical miles (2.8 km; 1.7 mi) east of Mount Borcik and 1 nautical mile (1.9 km; 1.2 mi) south-southwest of Mount Stump in southeast Hays Mountains. Named by US-ACAN in association with Mount Stump after Philip V. Colbert, geologist, Arizona State University, logistic coordinator and field associate with Edmund Stump on six USARP expeditions to the Transantarctic Mountains, 1970-71 through 1981–82, including the area of this mountain.

=== Cox Peaks ===
86°03′S 153°30′W. A series of peaks on a ridge, located 5 nautical miles (9.3 km; 5.8 mi) southeast of Mount Crockett, extending eastward from Hays Mountains and terminating at Scott Glacier. Mapped by USGS from surveys and USN air photos, 1960–64. Named by US-ACAN for Allan V. Cox, USGS geologist at McMurdo Station, 1965–66.

=== Mount Borcik ===
86°12′S 153°38′W. A prominent mountain, 2,780 metres (9,120 ft) high, standing 4.5 nautical miles (8.3 km; 5.2 mi) north-northwest of Mount Dietz in southern Hays Mountains. Mapped by USGS from surveys and USN air photos, 1960–64. Named by US-ACAN for Lt. Cdr. Andrew J. Borcik, pilot on photographic flights during USN OpDFrz, 1965–67.

=== Mount Walshe ===
86°11′S 152°15′W. A bare rock peak, 2,050 metres (6,730 ft) high, standing at the north side of Bartlett Glacier where it joins Scott Glacier, in southern Hays Mountains. Mapped by USGS from surveys and USN air photos, 1960–64. Named by US-ACAN for Lt. Cdr. Edward C. Walshe Jr., USN, an officer aboard the Arneb in Antarctica in the 1957–58 and 1958–59 seasons; on the staff of the Commander, U.S. Naval Support Force, Antarctica, during 1966–67.

=== Mount Dietz ===
86°16′S 153°10′W. A mountain, 2,250 metres (7,380 ft) high, just north of the confluence of Souchez and Bartlett Glaciers where it marks the south limit of Hays Mountains. Mapped by USGS from surveys and USN air photos, 1960–64. Named by US-ACAN for Lt. D.L. Dietz, USN, pilot on photographic flights during Operation Deep Freeze 1964 and 1965.

== Sources ==
- Alberts, Fred G., ed. (1995), Geographic Names of the Antarctic (PDF) (2 ed.), United States Board on Geographic Names This article incorporates public domain material from websites or documents of the United States Board on Geographic Names.
- Mount Goodale, USGS: United States Geological Survey
- Nilsen Plateau, USGS: United States Geological Survey

This article incorporates public domain material from websites or documents of the United States Geological Survey.
