= American Society on Aging =

Nonprofit organization in San Francisco, United States

- Logo as of 2023
- Predecessor: Western Gerontological Society
- Formation: 1954
- Type: Professional Association
- Location: 548 Market Street, PMB 85589, San Francisco, CA 94104, USA
- Members: 5,000
- President & CEO: Leanne Clark-Shirley, PhD
- Website: www.asaging.org

American Society on Aging (ASA) is a professional association in the United States dedicated to enhancing the knowledge and skills of those working with and on behalf of older adults. Founded in 1954 as the Western Gerontological Society, it has since grown to be one of the largest and most diverse aging organizations, with a membership comprising practitioners, educators, administrators, policymakers, and researchers among others.

== History ==
The American Society on Aging (ASA) was founded in San Francisco in 1954 as the Western Gerontological Society (WGS). Its establishment coincided with the field of gerontology and a growing awareness of the increasing older adult population in the United States. The WGS's initial focus was knowledge sharing, primarily through its annual conference proceedings, which began publication in 1960.

The society's early activities paralleled significant legislative developments, including the Older Americans Act, Medicare, and Medicaid in 1965, reflecting increasing governmental support for aging services. During the 1970s, the WGS broadened its scope to include education, advocacy, and professional networking.

In 1985, the WGS changed its name to the American Society on Aging to reflect its expanding national influence and broader mission. In 1988, the ASA established the Minority Concerns Committee, demonstrating an early commitment to diversity and equity within aging services.

The 1990s marked a period of significant growth. The society's newsletter, formerly titled "WGS Connection," was renamed Aging Today in 1990, becoming a key platform for news and analysis on aging-related issues. In 1993, the ASA launched the Journalists Exchange on Aging to improve media coverage of aging and convened one of the first national conferences on lesbian and gay aging issues, which led to the formation of the Lesbian and Gay Aging Issues Network. The New Ventures in Leadership program, designed to cultivate leadership among professionals of color in aging services, was established in 1993.

The ASA continued to expand its educational programs in the 21st century through conferences and specialized workshops. Its involvement in discussions surrounding the creation of the Administration for Community Living in 2013 highlighted its influence on aging policy. The society celebrated its 60th anniversary in 2014.

In 2019, the ASA's annual conference returned to New Orleans after nearly two decades and featured the inaugural Public Policy Town Hall. The COVID-19 pandemic in 2020 presented unprecedented challenges to the aging community. Under the leadership of Peter Kaldes, who became CEO in March 2020, the ASA adapted its services and advocacy efforts to address these challenges.

The ASA's current mission is combating ageism, promoting equity, and strengthening the aging sector. Its annual "On Aging" conference, planned for 2025, will emphasize culture and ageism. The ASA's history reflects its ongoing adaptation and dedication to improving the lives of older adults through knowledge dissemination, advocacy, and community building.

== Mission and Activities ==
ASA's mission is to cultivate leadership, advance knowledge, and strengthen the skills of its members and others who work with older adults. The society engages in a variety of activities to achieve these goals:

- Conferences: ASA organizes the annual "Aging in America" conference, attracting professionals nationwide. This conference is a platform for sharing knowledge, fostering innovation, and networking among those in the field of aging.
- Publications: ASA publishes several resources, including Generations, a quarterly journal, and Generations Today, a bimonthly digital publication focusing on contemporary issues in aging.
- Education and Training: Through the On Aging Institute, ASA offers educational programs, workshops, and webinars, providing continuing education credits and professional development opportunities.
- Policy Advocacy: While ASA does not directly lobby, it supports advocacy efforts by providing resources and platforms for discussing policy issues affecting older adults, like elder justice, Social Security, and healthcare coverage.
- Diversity, Equity, and Inclusion: ASA is committed to combating ageism, racism, ableism, and heterosexism within its programs and organizational structure, aiming for greater inclusivity and equity in aging services.

== Membership ==
The organization has over 5,000 members. Membership offers benefits such as access to publications, discounts on conferences and educational programs, networking opportunities, and involvement in policy discussions. ASA's members come from various disciplines, reflecting the multidisciplinary nature of aging issues.

== Publications ==
- Generations Journal: A peer-reviewed publication exploring significant aging themes.
- Generations Today: Offers timely news, features, and insights on recent developments in aging policy, research, and practice.

== Notable Initiatives ==
- On Aging Conference: An annual event key to professional discourse on aging.
- ASA RISE (Rising Impact on Systems in Equity): A fellowship program focused on leadership development for professionals of color in the aging field, emphasizing systemic change and equity.

== Leadership ==
Leanne Clark-Shirley, PhD, serves as the President & CEO of ASA. A diverse board of directors governs the society and is committed to advancing ASA's mission.

== See also ==
- Gerontology
- Ageism
- Elderly care
