= Mount McIntyre =

Mountain in Ross Dependency, Antarctica

- Location within Antarctica

Highest point
- Elevation: 2,956 m (9,698 ft)
- Coordinates: 87°17′S 153°0′W

Naming
- Etymology: Marvin H. McIntyre

Mount McIntyre is a rocky, flat, projecting-type mountain that forms the northeastern extremity of D'Angelo Bluff in Antarctica. It rises at the west side of Scott Glacier, near the head, directly opposite Mount Howe. The mountain was discovered in December 1934 by the Byrd Antarctic Expedition geological party led by Quin Blackburn, and was named by Admiral Byrd for Marvin H. McIntyre, Secretary to the President of the United States at that time, Franklin D. Roosevelt.
