= Gjertsen =

Gjertsen is a Norwegian surname. Notable people with the surname include:

- Astrid Gjertsen (1928–2020), Norwegian politician
- Doug Gjertsen (born 1967), American swimmer
- Finn Gjertsen (born 1959), Norwegian artistic gymnast
- Joey Gjertsen (born 1982), American soccer player
- Lasse Gjertsen (born 1984), Norwegian animator, musician, and videographer
- Torgil Øwre Gjertsen (born 1992), Norwegian footballer

== See also ==
- Randi Bakke-Gjertsen (1904–1984), Norwegian pair skater
- Mount Gjertsen, a mountain of Marie Byrd Land, Antarctica
- Gjertsen Promontory, a promontory of Marie Byrd Land, Antarctica
