= Gothic Mountains =

Mountains in Antarctica

Gothic Mountains in Antarctica

The Gothic Mountains (86°00′S 150°00′W) is a group of mountains, 20 nautical miles (37 km; 23 mi) long, in the Queen Maud Mountains of Antarctica, located west of Watson Escarpment and bounded by Scott Glacier, Albanus Glacier, and Griffith Glacier.

== Exploration and naming ==
The mountains were first visited in December 1934 by the Byrd Antarctic Expedition (ByrdAE) geological party led by Quin Blackburn. The name was proposed by Edmund Stump, leader of a United States Antarctic Research Program (USARP) - Arizona State University geological party which made investigations here in the 1980–81 season. The mountains are composed of granites which have weathered to produce a series of spires and peaks reminiscent of a Gothic cathedral.

== Location ==
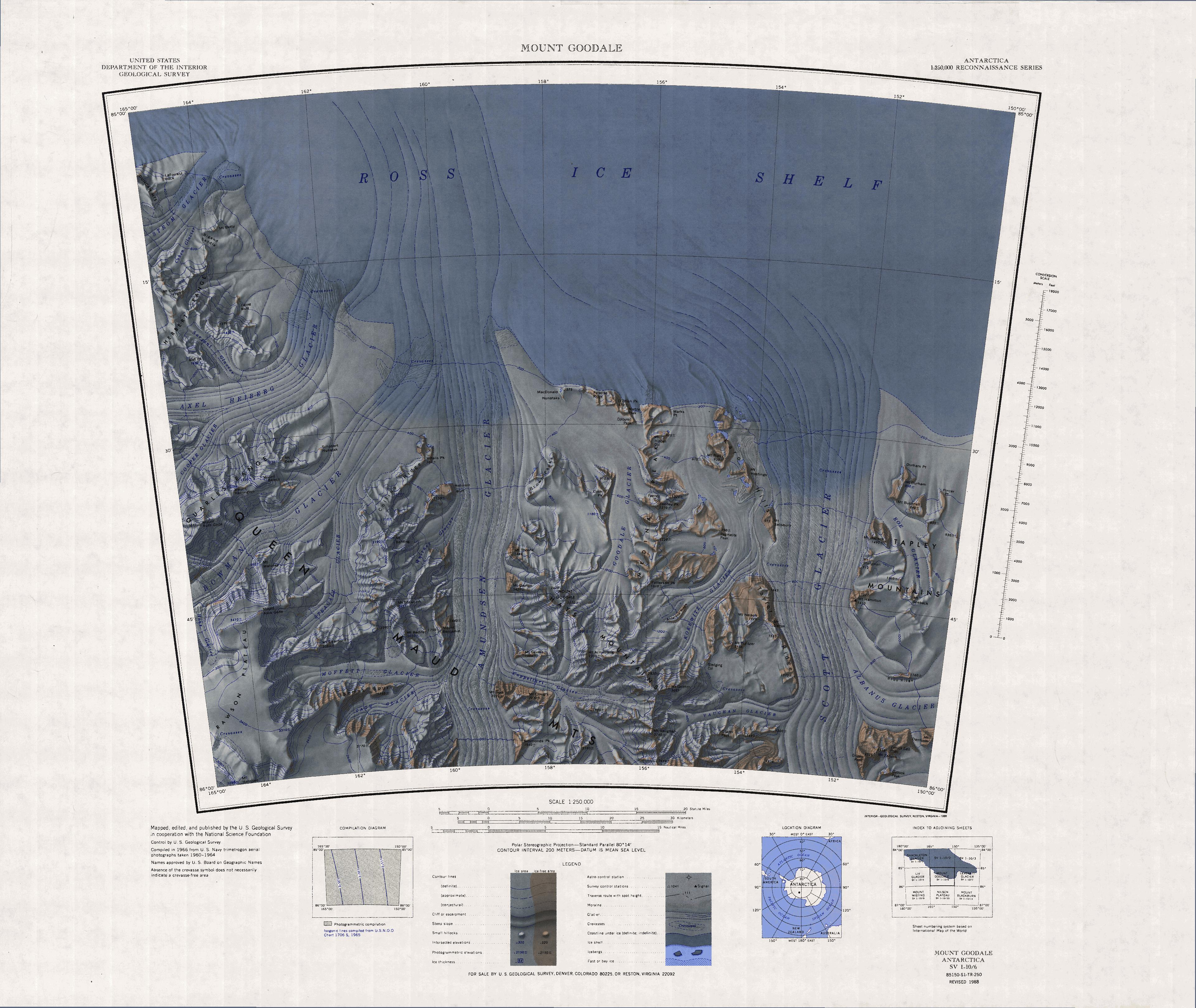
Northwestern Gothic Mountains in extreme southeast of map

The western Gothic Mountains are just east of Scott Glacier, to the south of the point where the Albanus Glacier joins the Scott Glacier from the east. Peaks in the western section include, from west to east, Grizzly Peak, Mount Zanuck, Zanuck East Peak, Outlook Peak and Mount Danforth. To the southwest are the Organ Pipe Peaks, Mount Harkness and Mount McKercher. The northeastern section includes Mount Andrews and Mount Gerdel. The southeastern part of the range, to the north of Griffith Glacier, includes Scudder Mountain, Mount McKercher, Ruotolo Peak.

== Western features ==
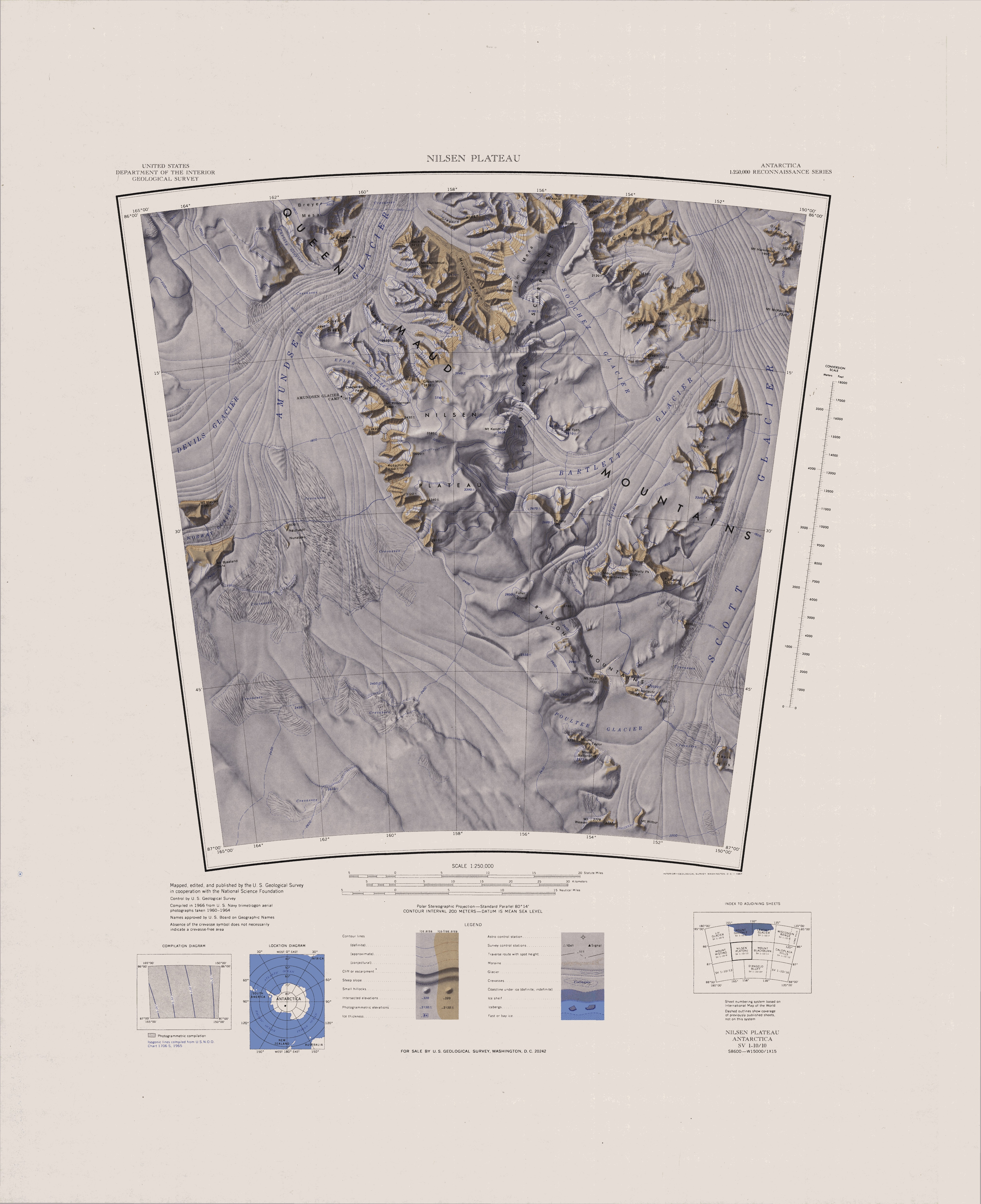
Southwestern Gothic Mountains in extreme northeast of map

Features of the western part of the range include, from west to east, north to south:

=== Grizzly Peak ===
85°58′S 151°22′W. A peak rising to 2,200 metres (7,200 ft) high on the southwest flank of Mount Zanuck. The feature was visited in December 1934 by the Byrd Antarctic Expedition geological party and was included in "Darryl Zanuck Mountain." The granite of this peak is highly jointed and fairly bristles with small spires, suggestive of the coat of a grizzly bear.

=== Mount Zanuck ===
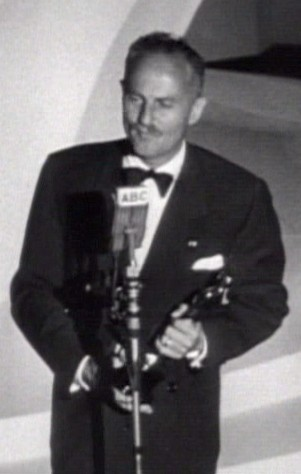
Darryl F Zanuck at 1947 Oscars

85°58′S 151°10′W. A mountain about 5 miles (8.0 km) long surmounted by three sharp peaks in an east–west line, the highest of which rises to 2,525 metres (8,284 ft). The feature stands at the south side of Albanus Glacier at the point where the latter joins Scott Glacier. Discovered by Rear Admiral Byrd on the Byrd Antarctic Expedition flight to the South Pole in November 1929. The mountain was visited in December 1934 by the Byrd Antarctic Expedition geological party under Quin Blackburn. Named by Byrd for Darryl F. Zanuck, official of Twentieth Century-Fox Pictures, who assisted the Byrd Antarctic Expedition, 1933–35, in assembling motion-picture records, and later supplied the USAS, 1939–41, with motion-picture projectors.

=== Zanuck East Peak ===
85°57′S 150°53′W. The easternmost of the three high peaks that rise from Mount Zanuck massif. The peak was discovered and mapped by the geological party of the Byrd Antarctic Expedition, 1933–35, led by Quin Blackburn. The name was applied in association with Mount Zanuck by members of NZGSAE who climbed the peak in the 1969–70 season.

=== Outlook Peak ===
85°59′S 150°50′W. A low peak that rises steeply 2 miles (3.2 km) southeast of Mount Zanuck. Mapped by the USGS from surveys and United States Navy air photos, 1960–64. So named by members of NZGSAE, 1969–70, who obtained a good view of the next stage of their route from here.

=== Mount Danforth ===
85°56′S 150°01′W. An ice-free, pyramidal mountain over 2,000 metres (6,600 ft) high, standing immediately east of Mount Zanuck on the south side of Albanus Glacier. Discovered in December 1934 by the Byrd Antarctic Expedition geological party under Quin Blackburn, and named by Byrd for William H. Danforth of the Purina Mills, St. Louis, contributor to the expedition.

=== Organ Pipe Peaks ===
86°03′S 150°00′W. A row of aiguille type rock peaks, 7 miles (11 km) long, standing just north of Mount Harkness. Discovered by the geological party of the Byrd Antarctic Expedition, 1933–35, who gave the descriptive name.

=== The Spectre ===
86°03′S 150°10′W. A prominent rock spire, 2,020 metres (6,630 ft) high, near the center of Organ Pipe Peaks. Discovered in December 1934 by the Byrd Antarctic Expedition geological party under Quin Blackburn. The allusive name was suggested by Edmund Stump, leader of the USARP-Arizona State University geological party in the Gothic Mountains, 1980–81.

=== Mount Harkness ===
86°04′S 150°36′W. A mountain, 1,900 metres (6,200 ft) high, standing 1.5 miles (2.4 km) south of Organ Pipe Peaks and forming part of the east wall of Scott Glacier. Discovered in December 1934 by the Byrd Antarctic Expedition geological party under Quin Blackburn, and named at that time by R. Admiral Byrd for Bruce Harkness, friend of Richard S. Russell Jr., a member of that party.

=== Altar Peak ===
86°04′S 150°23′W. A peak, 1,780 metres (5,840 ft) high, located 1 mile (1.6 km) east-southeast of Mount Harkness. The feature was first visited in December 1934 by the Byrd Antarctic Expedition geological party under Quin Blackburn. The descriptive name was suggested by Edmund Stump, leader of a USARP-Arizona State University geological party which studied this peak, 1987–88.

== Eastern features ==
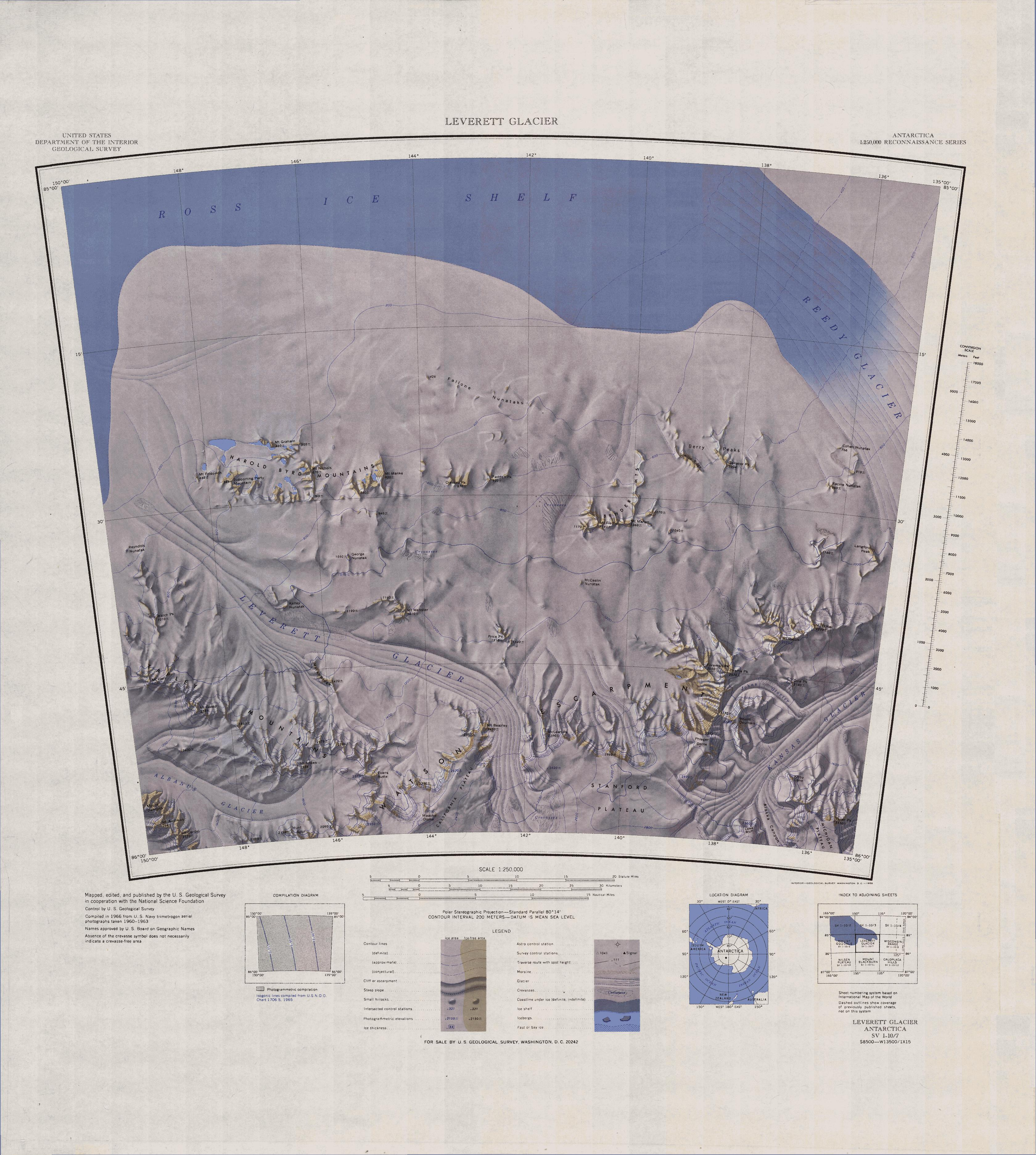
Northeastern Gothic Mountains in extreme southwest of map

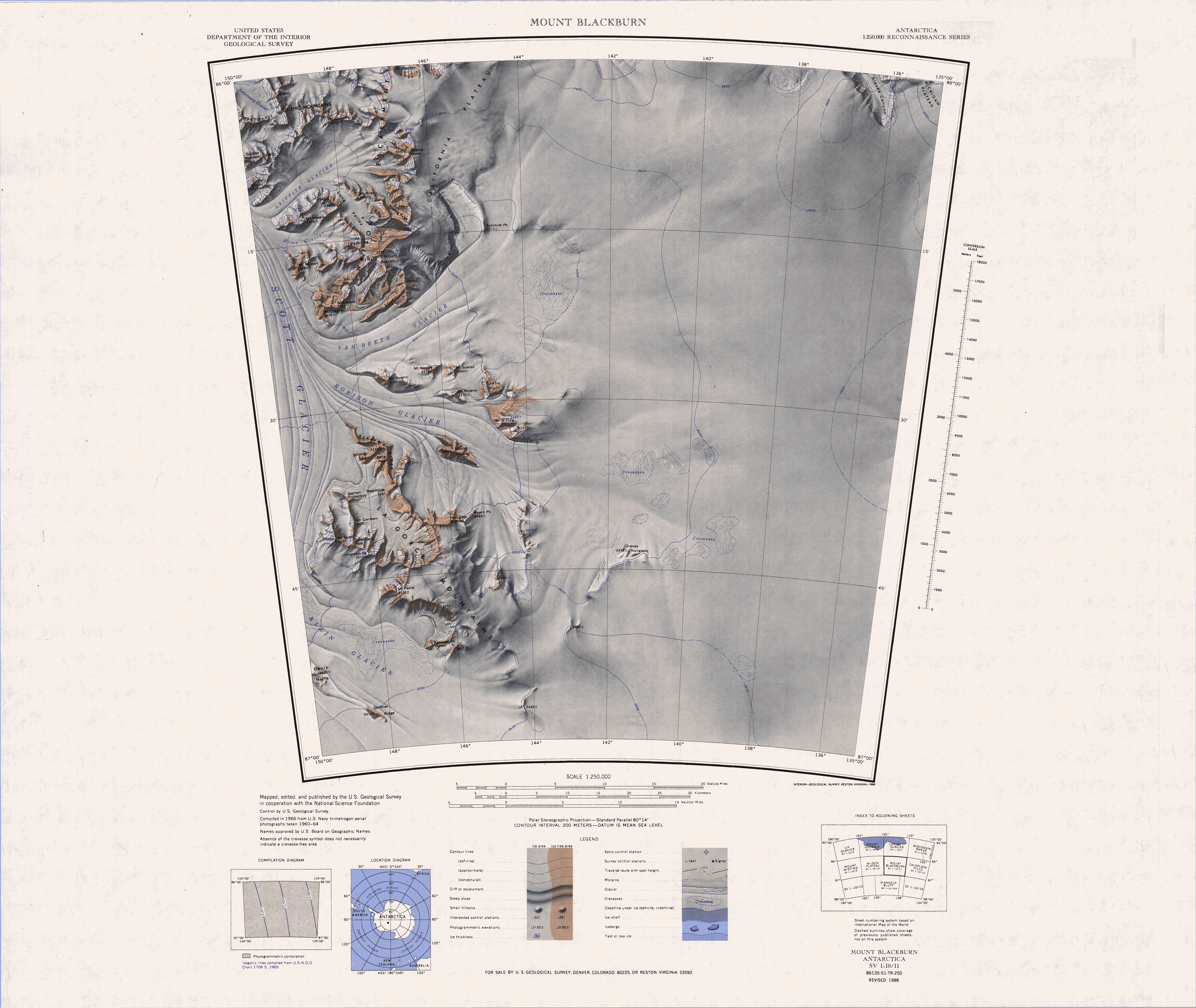
Southeastern Gothic Mountains in extreme northwest of map

Features of the eastern part of the range include, from west to east, north to south:

=== Mount Andrews ===
85°57′S 149°41′W. Mountain, 2,480 metres (8,140 ft) high, standing between Mount Danforth and Mount Gerdel on the south side of Albanus Glacier. Mapped by USGS from surveys and United States Navy air photos, 1960–63. Named by US-ACAN for Ensign Stanley J. Andrews, United States Navy, who accompanied Lt. George W. Warden in aircraft flights over the Queen Maud Mountains during United States Navy Operation Highjump, 1946–47.

=== Mount Gerdel ===
85°59′S 149°19′W. Mountain, 2,520 metres (8,270 ft) high, standing 2 miles (3.2 km) southeast of Mount Andrews at the south side of Albanus Glacier. Mapped by USGS from ground surveys and United States Navy air photos, 1960–63. Named by US-ACAN for Lt. David H. Gerdel, United States Navy, of the Byrd Station winter party, 1965.

=== Scudder Mountain ===
86°07′S 149°36′W. A mountain, 2,280 metres (7,480 ft) high, between Organ Pipe Peaks and Mount McKercher on the east side of Scott Glacier. The name appears in Paul Siple's 1938 botany report on the Byrd Antarctic Expedition, 1933–35, based on exploration of this vicinity by the expedition's geological party led by Quin Blackburn.

=== Mount McKercher ===
86°09′S 150°02′W. A mountain, 2,230 metres (7,320 ft) high, standing at the east side of Scott Glacier, just north of the mouth of Griffith Glacier. Discovered in December 1934 by the Byrd Antarctic Expedition geological party under Qum Blackburn, and named for Hazel McKercher, secretary to R. Admiral Byrd during the period of this expedition.

=== Ruotolo Peak ===
86°04′S 148°06′W. A peak, 2,490 metres (8,170 ft) high, surmounting the north side of Griffith Glacier, close west of the California Plateau and Watson Escarpment. Mapped by USGS from surveys and United States Navy air photos, 1960–64. Named by US-ACAN for Lt. Cdr. Anthony P. Ruotolo, aircraft pilot with United States Navy Squadron VX-6 on Operation Deep Freeze 1966 and 1967.

== Sources ==
- Alberts, Fred G., ed. (1995), Geographic Names of the Antarctic (PDF) (2 ed.), United States Board on Geographic Names This article incorporates public domain material from websites or documents of the United States Board on Geographic Names.
- Mount Blackburn, United States Geological Survey
- Leverett Glacier, United States Geological Survey
- Mount Goodale, United States Geological Survey
- Nilsen Plateau, United States Geological Survey
- This article incorporates public domain material from websites or documents of the United States Geological Survey.
