= Rawson Mountains (Antarctica) =

Mountain range in Antarctica

- Location within Antarctica

Geography
- Continent: Antarctica
- Region: Ross Dependency
- Range coordinates: 86°43′S 154°40′W
- Parent range: Queen Maud Mountains

The Rawson Mountains (86°43′S 154°40′W) lie within the Queen Maud Mountains to the southeast of the Ross Ice Shelf in Antarctica. They are a crescent-shaped range of tabular, ice-covered mountains including Fuller Dome, Mount Wyatt and Mount Verlautz, standing southeast of Nilsen Plateau and extending southeast for 18 nautical miles (33 km; 21 mi) to the west side of Scott Glacier.

== Discovery and naming ==
The Rawson Mountains were discovered in December 1934 by the Byrd Antarctic Expedition geological party under Quin Blackburn. They were named by Richard E. Byrd for Frederick H. Rawson, American banker and contributor to the Byrd Antarctic Expeditions of 1928-30 and 1933-35.

== Location ==
The Rawson Mountains are to the southeast of Nilsen Plateau and south of the head of the Holdsworth Glacier. The Scott Glacier forms to their east and flows north towards the Ross Ice Shelf. The Amundsen Glacier forms to their west and flows northwest towards the Ross Ice Shelf.

Features of the Rawson Mountains, from west to east, include Fuller Dome, Mount Wyatt and Mount Verlautz. To the south of the mountains is the Poulter Glacier, which in turn is north of the isolated Mount Innes-Taylor, Mount Saltonstall, Mount Weaver and Mount Wilbur. To the north of the mountains are a line of mountains west of Scott Glacier including Mount Przywitowski, McNally Peak, Mount Farley, Mount Denauro, Lee Peak, Mount Ruth and Mount Gardiner. These last two stand where Bartlett Glacier and Scott Glacier converge.

== Features ==
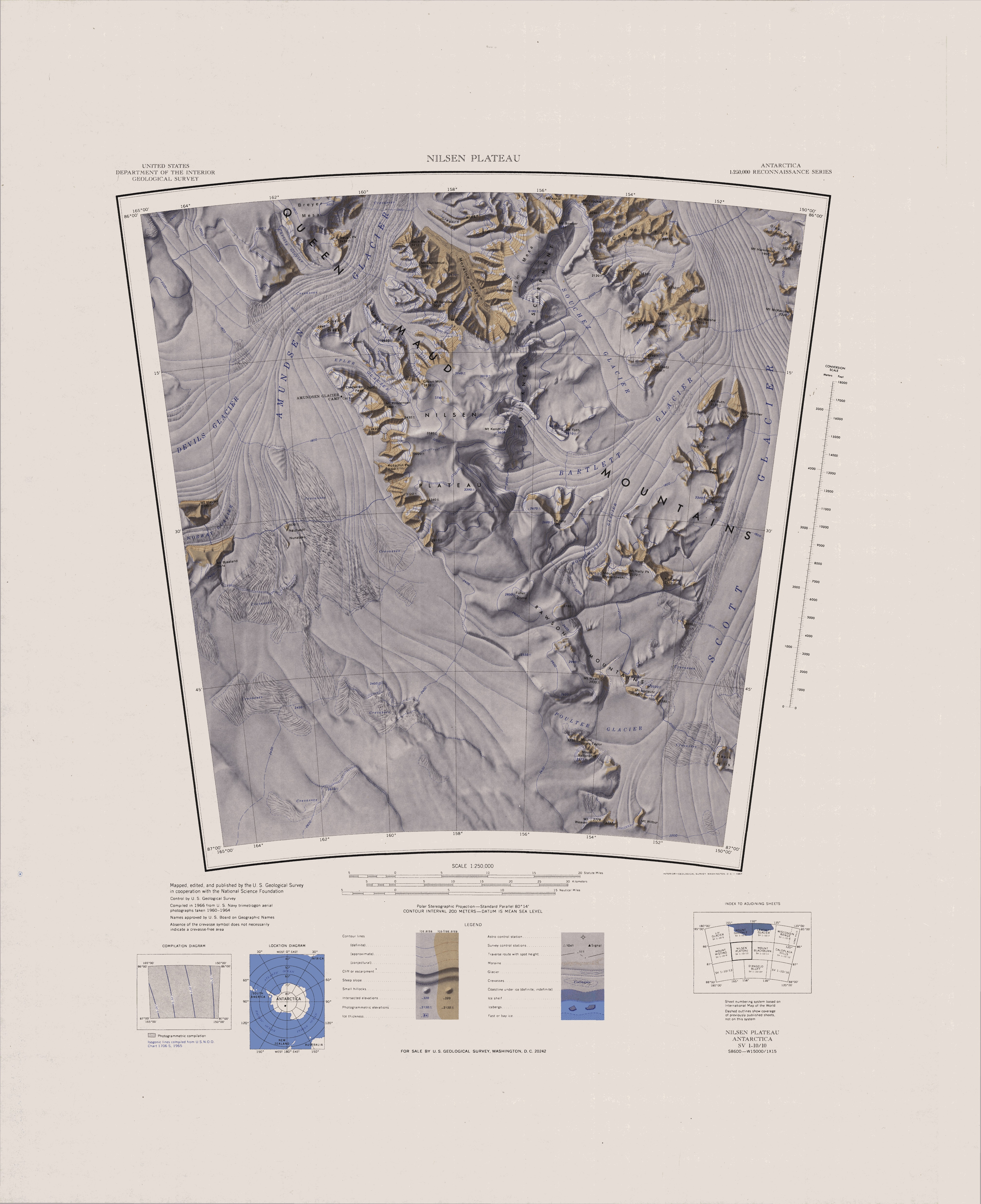
Rawson Mountains to the southeast of map

Named features of the Rawson Mountains include, from west to east:

=== Fuller Dome ===
86°38′S 156°18′W. A dome-shaped, ice-covered mountain. 2,850 metres (9,350 ft) high, at the northwest end of the Rawson Mountains. Mapped by USGS from surveys and United States Navy air photos, 1960-64. Named by US-ACAN for C.E. Fuller, storekeeper with United States Navy Squadron VX-6 on Operation Deep Freeze 1966 and 1967.

=== Mount Wyatt ===
86°46′S 154°00′W. A prominent flat-topped mountain, 2,930 metres (9,610 ft) high, standing 3 nautical miles (5.6 km; 3.5 mi) west of Mount Verlautz in the Rawson Mountains. Discovered in December 1934 by the Byrd Antarctic Expedition geological party under Quin Blackburn and named by Rear Admiral Byrd for Jane Wyatt, a friend of Richard S. Russell, Jr., a member of that party.

=== Mount Verlautz ===
86°46′S 153°00′W. A mountain 2,490 metres (8,170 ft) high standing just north of the mouth of Poulter Glacier in the southeast end of the Rawson Mountains. Named by US-ACAN for Major Sidney J. Verlautz, United States Army Transportation Corps, who served as logistics research officer on the staff of the Commander, United States Naval Support Force, Antarctica.

== Features to the south ==
Features south of the Poulter Glacier, which drains east into Scott Glacier, include:

=== Mount Innes-Taylor ===
86°51′S 154°27′W. A mountain, 2,730 metres (8,960 ft) high, standing 1 nautical mile (1.9 km; 1.2 mi) north of Mount Saltonstall at the south side of Poulter Glacier. Discovered in December 1934 by the Byrd Antarctic Expedition geological party under Quin Blackburn, and named by Byrd for Capt. Alan Innes-Taylor who served with the expedition as chief of trail operations.

=== Mount Saltonstall ===
86°53′S 154°18′W. A tabular mountain, 2,975 metres (9,760 ft) high, standing 1 nautical mile (1.9 km; 1.2 mi) south of Mount Innes-Taylor at the south side of Poulter Glacier. Discovered in December 1934 by the Byrd Antarctic Expedition geological party under Quin Blackburn, and named by Byrd for John Saltonstall, contributor to the expedition.

=== Sheridan Bluff ===
86°53′S 153°30′W. A bluff at the south side of the junction of Poulter Glacier and Scott Glacier, 2 nautical miles (3.7 km; 2.3 mi) east-southeast of Mount Saltonstall. Mapped by USGS from surveys and USN aerial photographs, 1960–64. Named by US-ACAN after Michael F. Sheridan, Professor of Geology, Arizona State University, a member of a USARP field party in this area during the 1978-79 season.

=== Mount Weaver ===
86°58′S 153°50′W. A mountain, 2,780 metres (9,120 ft) high, standing 2 nautical miles (3.7 km; 2.3 mi) west of Mount Wilbur at the head of Scott Glacier. Discovered and ascended in December 1934 by members of the Byrd Antarctic Expedition geological party under Quin Blackburn. Named by them for Charles E. Weaver, professor of paleontology at the University of Washington.

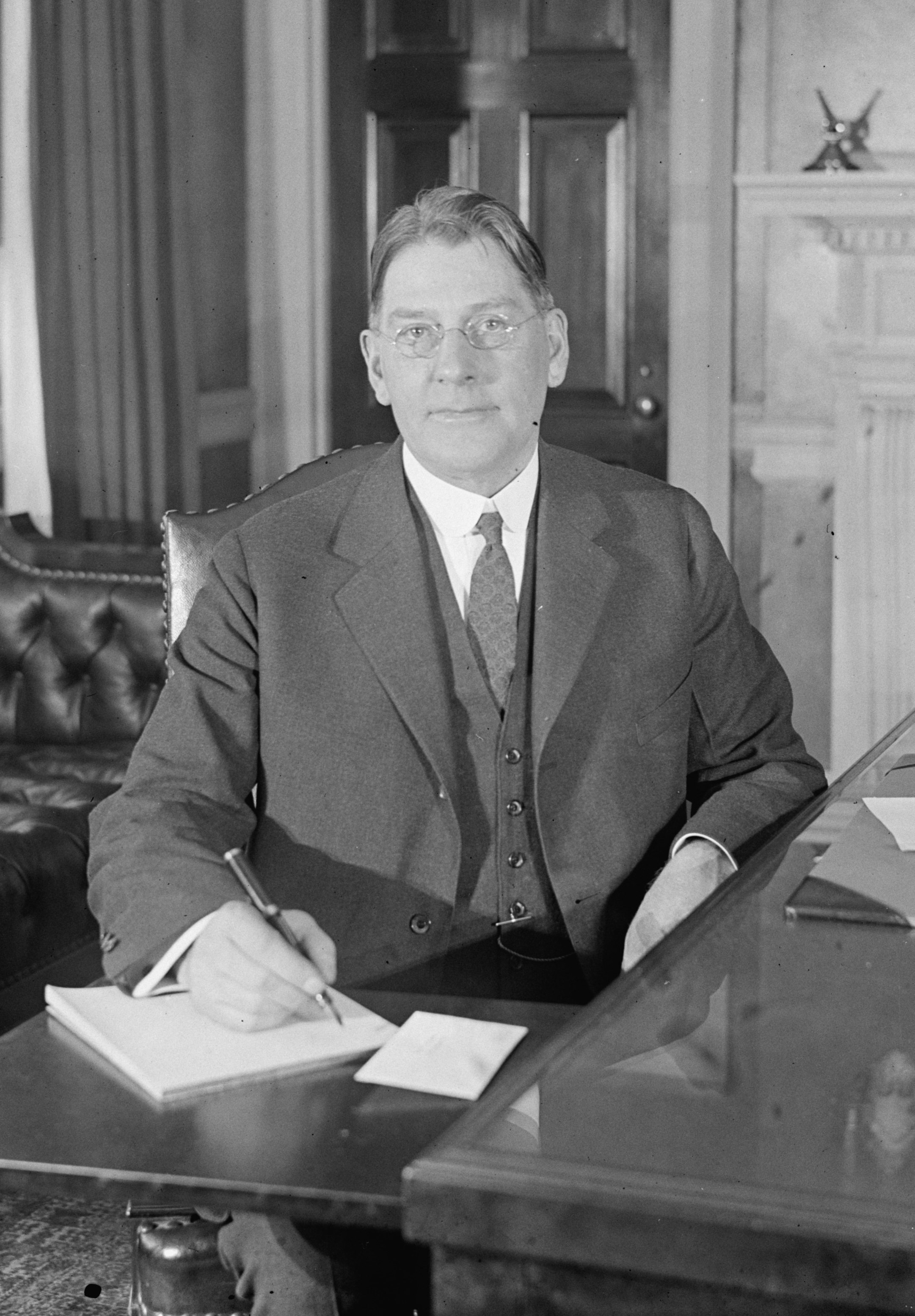
Curtis D. Wilbur

=== Mount Wilbur ===
86°58′S 152°37′W. A mountain standing 2 nautical miles (3.7 km; 2.3 mi) east of Mount Weaver at the head of Scott Glacier. Discovered in December 1934 by the Byrd Antarctic Expedition geological party under Quin Blackburn, and named by Byrd for the Hon. Curtis D. Wilbur, Secretary of the Navy, 1925-29.

== Features to the north ==
The line of mountains north of the Rawson Mountains along the west of Scott Glacier include, from south to north:

=== Mount Przywitowski ===
86°36′S 154°08′W. A mountain, 2,770 metres (9,090 ft) high, standing at the southeast side of Holdsworth Glacier, 2.5 nautical miles (4.6 km; 2.9 mi) west of McNally Peak. Mapped by USGS from surveys and United States Navy air photos, 1960-64. Named by US-ACAN for Richard F. Przywitowski, USARP scientific leader at South Pole Station, winter 1966.

=== McNally Peak ===
86°35′S 153°24′W. A peak 2,570 metres (8,430 ft) high, standing 3.5 nautical miles (6.5 km; 4.0 mi) west of Mount Parley, near the southeast side of Holdsworth Glacier, in the Queen Maud Mountains. Named by US-ACAN for Cdr. Joseph J. McNally, United States Navy, supply officer at McMurdo Station, winter 1959; on the staff of the Commander, United States Naval Support Force, Antarctica, during United States Navy OpDFrz 1967.

=== Mount Farley ===
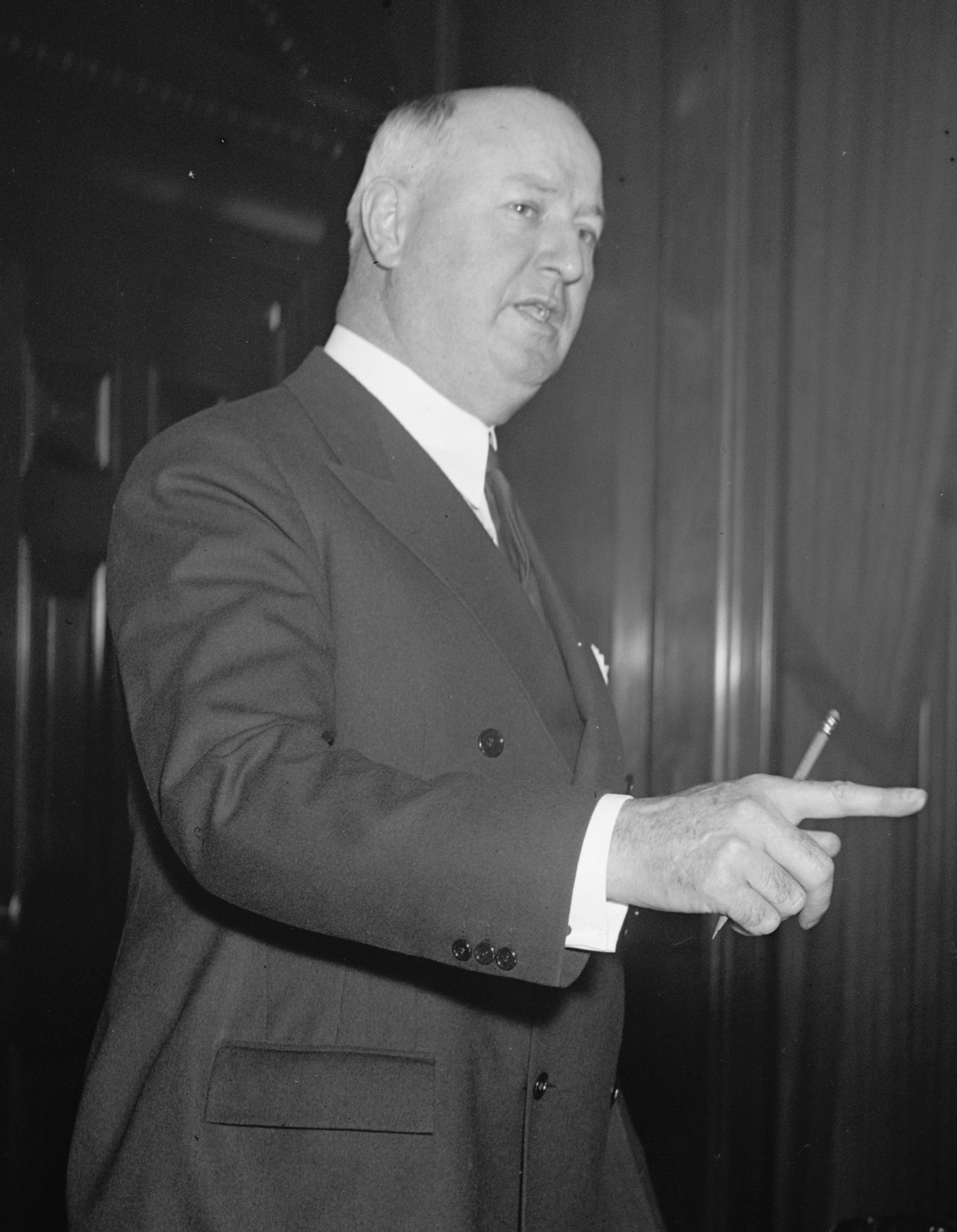
James A. Farley

86°35′S 152°30′W. A conspicuous rock peak, 2,670 metres (8,760 ft) high, standing at the west side of Scott Glacier, 3 nautical miles (5.6 km; 3.5 mi) east of McNally Peak. Discovered in December 1934 by the Byrd Antarctic Expedition geological party under Quin Blackburn, and named at that time by Byrd for the Hon. James Farley, Postmaster General of the United States.

=== Mount Amherst ===
86°32′S 153°06′W. A peak rising to 2,400 metres (7,900 ft) between Holdsworth Glacier and Scott Glacier, 3 nautical miles (5.6 km; 3.5 mi) north-northeast of McNally Peak. Mapped by USGS from surveys and United States Navy aerial photographs, 1960–64. The geology of the peak was studied in the 1978–79 season by a USARP-Arizona State University field party. Named by US-ACAN after Amherst College, Amherst, MA, alma mater of Michael F. Sheridan, a member of the field party.

=== Tongue Peak ===
86°34′S 153°02′W. A peak rising to about 2,450 metres (8,040 ft) between Holdsworth Glacier and Scott Glacier, 3 nautical miles (5.6 km; 3.5 mi) west-northwest of Mount Farley. The peak was mapped by USGS from surveys and USN aerial photographs, 1960-64. It was geologically mapped by a USARP-Arizona State University field party, 1978-79, and was named by geologist Scott G. Borg, a member of the party. The name derives from a well developed tongue-shaped moraine in an abandoned cirque between the west and north ridges of the peak.

=== Sagehen Nunataks ===
86°30′S 153°15′W. A roughly triangular group of hills rising to about 150 metres (490 ft) above base level on the east side of Holdsworth Glacier, 5 nautical miles (9.3 km; 5.8 mi) north of McNally Peak. Mapped by USGS from surveys and USN aerial photographs, 1960–64. Visited by a USARP–Arizona State University geological field party, 1978–79, and named after the Sagehen, mascot of Pomona College, Claremont, CA, the alma mater of Scott G. Borg, one of the field party members.

=== Mount Denauro ===
86°27′S 151°30′W. Mountain, 2,340 metres (7,680 ft) high, standing on the west side of Scott Glacier, 3 nautical miles (5.6 km; 3.5 mi) south of Lee Peak. Mapped by USGS from surveys and United States Navy air photos, 1960-64. Named by US-ACAN for Ralph Denauro, aviation mechanic with United States Navy Squadron VX-6 on Operation Deep Freeze 1966.

=== Cowie Dome ===
86°25′S 152°00′W. A dome-shaped summit at the east side of Bartlett Glacier, located 2 nautical miles (3.7 km; 2.3 mi) directly west of Lee Peak. Mapped by USGS from surveys and United States Navy air photos, 1960-64. Named by NZ-APC for George Donald (Don) Cowie, leader of the NZGSAE which visited the region in 1969-70.

=== Lee Peak ===
86°25′S 151°35′W. A peak along the west side of Scott Glacier, 3 nautical miles (5.6 km; 3.5 mi) north of Mount Denauro. Mapped by USGS from surveys and United States Navy air photos, 1960-64. Named by US-ACAN for Frank P. Lee, photographer on aerial flights in Antarctica during United States Navy Operation Deep Freeze 1965, 1966 and 1967.

=== Mount Ruth ===
86°18′S 151°45′W. A ridge-shaped mountain, 2,170 metres (7,120 ft) high, standing 3 nautical miles (5.6 km; 3.5 mi) west of Mount Gardiner, at the southeast side of the lower reaches of Bartlett Glacier. Discovered in December 1934 by the Byrd Antarctic Expedition geological party under Quin Blackburn, and named at that time by R. Admiral Byrd for Ruth Black, deceased wife of Richard B. Black, expedition member who assisted with seismic, survey, and radio operations in the vicinity of Little America II.

=== Mount Gardiner ===
86°19′S 150°57′W. A ridge-like granitic mountain, 2,480 metres (8,140 ft) high, standing 3 nautical miles (5.6 km; 3.5 mi) east of Mount Ruth and just south of the junction of Bartlett and Scott Glaciers. Discovered in December 1934 by the Byrd Antarctic Expedition geological party under Quin Blackburn. Named by Byrd for Joseph T. Gardiner of Wellington, New Zealand, agent for the Byrd Antarctic Expedition of 1928-30 and 1933-35.

=== Bartlett Bench ===
86°24′S 152°18′W. A bare, flat benchlike elevation which overlooks the Bartlett Glacier from the east, located 6 nautical miles (11 km; 6.9 mi) south-southwest of Mount Ruth. Mapped by USGS from surveys and U.S. Navy air photos, 1960–64. Named by NZGSAE Scott Glacier Party, 1969-70, in association with the Bartlett Glacier.

== Sources ==
- Alberts, Fred G., ed. (1995), Geographic Names of the Antarctic (PDF) (2 ed.), United States Board on Geographic Names This article incorporates public domain material from websites or documents of the United States Board on Geographic Names.
- Nilsen Plateau, USGS: United States Geological Survey
- This article incorporates public domain material from websites or documents of the United States Geological Survey.
