= Leverett Glacier =

Glacier in Marie Byrd Land, Antarctica

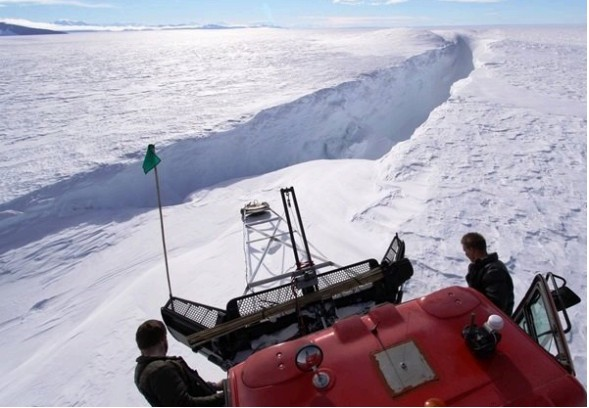
- Large crevasse on the Leverett Glacier

- Location within Antarctica
- Coordinates: 85°38′S 147°35′W
- Length: 50 nautical miles (93 km; 58 mi)

The Leverett Glacier (85°38′S 147°35′W) is about 50 nautical miles (90 km) long and 3 to 4 nautical miles (6 to 7 km) wide, flowing from the Antarctic Plateau to the south end of the Ross Ice Shelf through the Queen Maud Mountains. It is an important part of the South Pole Traverse from McMurdo Station to the Amundsen–Scott South Pole Station, providing a route for tractors to climb from the ice shelf through the Transantarctic Mountains to the polar plateau.

== Discovery and naming ==
The Leverett Glacier was discovered in December 1929 by the Byrd Antarctic Expedition geological party under Laurence Gould, and named by him for Frank Leverett, an eminent geologist at the University of Michigan and an authority on the glacial geology of the central United States.

== Course ==
The Leverett Glacier forms on the polar plateau to the west of the California Plateau. The Stanford Plateau is to the east. It flows north through the Watson Escarpment between Mount Beazley to the west and McLean Peak to the east, then turns to flow in a north-north-west direction between the Tapley Mountains and Harold Byrd Mountains. It passes Price Peak, Mount Webster, George Nunatak, Marsh Ridge and Kelley Nunatak. It turns northwest and flows to the southwest to the Ross Ice Shelf, which it enters between Reynolds Nunatak to the west and Mount Fridovich to the east. The Leverett Glacier terminates to the east of the Scott Glacier. There are no named tributaries.

According to Sailing Directions for Antarctica (1960), "The Leverett Glacier fronting the Watson Escarpment is imperfectly defined on its eastern and northern margins. This glacier of comparatively low gradient brings a large volume of ice from the eastern plateau to the Ross shelf ice. The outlet glaciers, from the Liv to the Robert Scott, produce a common piedmont in front of the flanking foothills; this piedmont is deflected northwestward by the ice flow descending from the Leverett Glacier and the ice sheet northward of it. This stream, descending from the eastward plateau, produces extensive folding and other disturbances of the shelf ice between the Liv and Robert Scott Glaciers, and this broken area likely extends some distance northwestward."

== South Pole Traverse ==
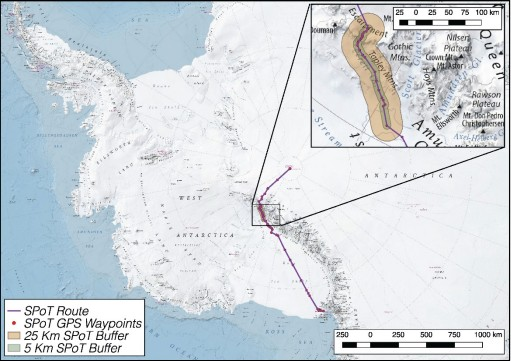
South Pole Traverse with Leverett Glacier highlighted

The Leverett Glacier is on the route through the Transantarctic Mountains for the South Pole Traverse (SPoT), an overland supply route between McMurdo Station and Amundsen–Scott South Pole Station. Until 2005 all fuel and other supplies were carried from the McMurdo Station to the Amundsen-Scott South Pole Station by Lockheed LC-130 Hercules aircraft equipped with skis, at considerable cost. Starting in 2005 the 1,600 kilometres (990 mi) South Pole Traverse was opened to deliver fuel using modified agricultural tractors pulling sleds holding bladders of fuel. The trip takes about 40 days each way. The route leads southeast over the McMurdo Ice Shelf and the Ross Ice Shelf for about 1,050 kilometres (650 mi). It then climbs up the Leverett Glacier to the Antarctic Plateau, rising 3,000 metres (9,800 ft) along the 100 kilometres (62 mi) glacier. The remainder of the route is a direct line of 450 kilometres (280 mi) across the Antarctic Plateau.

The glaciological and meteorological conditions in the Leverett Glacier area are highly variable. The inbound South Pole Traverse (SPoT) in December 2013 found an open crevasse about 4 kilometres (2.5 mi) long and 15 metres (49 ft) wide near the transverse route. Crevasses of this nature are potentially dangerous, and are hard to predict.

== Features ==
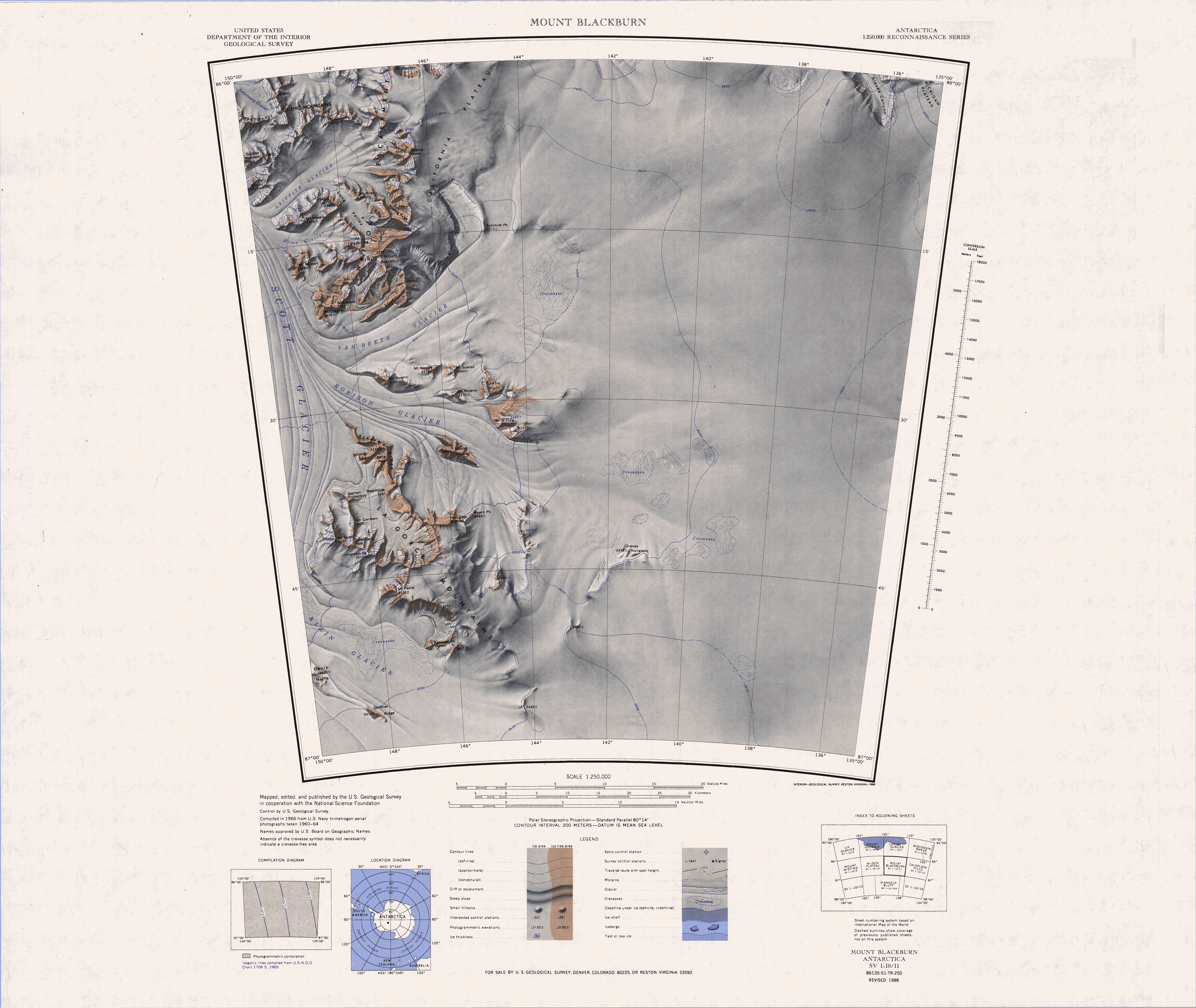
Polar plateau above Leverett Glacier

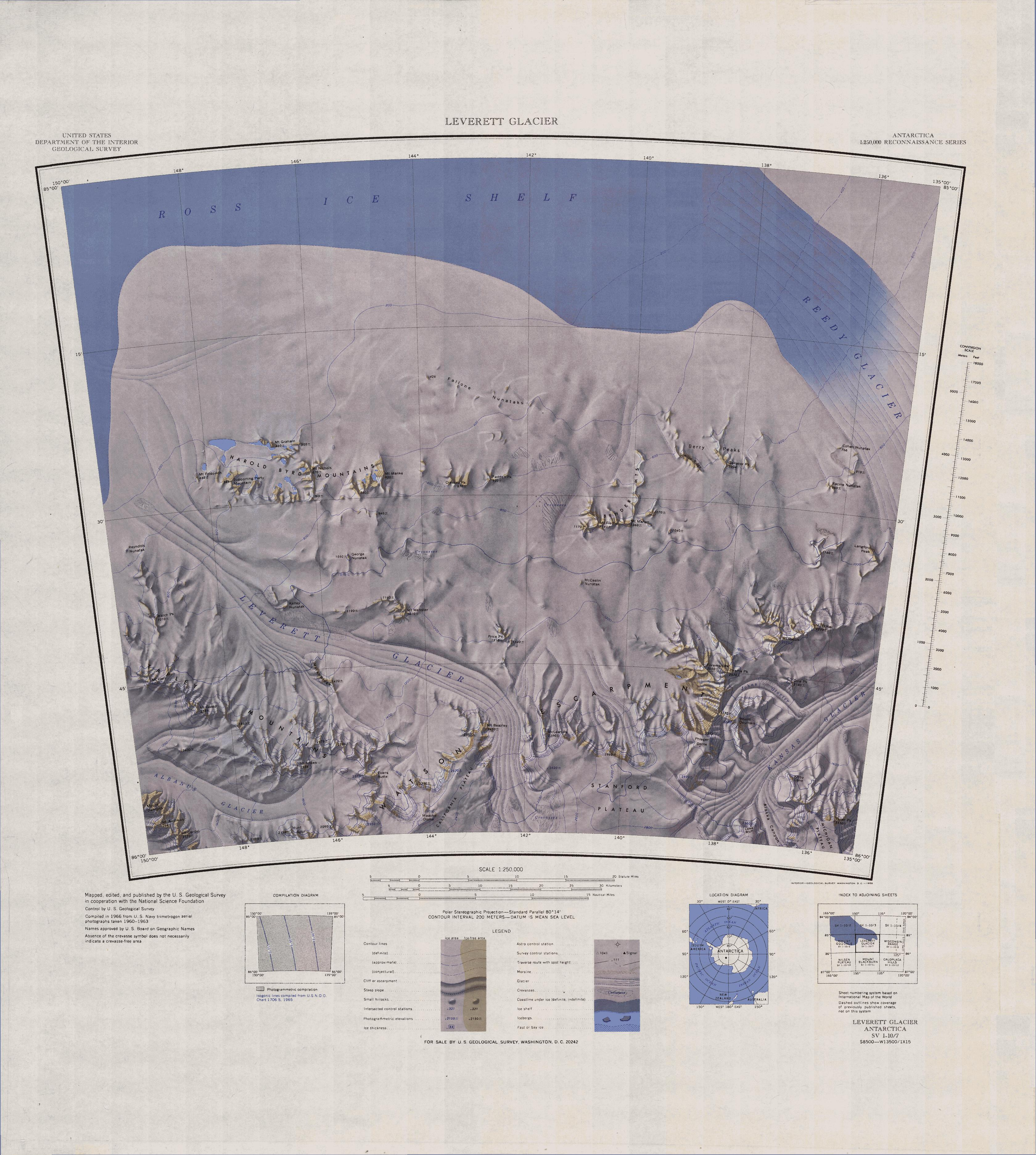
Leverett Glacier (southwest of map)

The glacier passes various isolated features:

=== Price Peak ===
85°43′S 142°24′W. A peak, 1,510 metres (4,950 ft) high, located at the north side of Leverett Glacier, 8 nautical miles (15 km; 9.2 mi) north of the extremity of California Plateau. Mapped by USGS from ground surveys and USN air photos, 1960–63. Named by US-ACAN for Floyd W. Price, personnel-man with USN Squadron VX-6, who participated in Operation Deep Freeze for 5 seasons, 1963–67.

=== George Nunatak ===
85°35′S 145°26′W A nunatak, 1,050 metres (3,440 ft) high, located midway between the east part of Harold Byrd Mountains and Leverett Glacier. Named by US-ACAN for Paul George, a member of the U.S. Army helicopter unit which supported the USGS Topo West and Topo East surveys of 1962–63.

=== Marsh Ridge ===
85°46′S 146°10′W. A rocky ridge, 3 nautical miles (5.6 km; 3.5 mi) long, midway along the south side of Leverett Glacier and 11 nautical miles (20 km; 13 mi) east-north-east of Mount Gould. Mapped by USGS from ground surveys and USN air photos, 1960–63. Named by US-ACAN for Robert D. Marsh, a cook with the Byrd Station winter party, 1957.

=== Kelley Nunatak ===
85°39′S 146°44′W. A nunatak on the north side of Leverett Glacier, 12 nautical miles (22 km; 14 mi) northeast of Mount Gould. Mapped by USGS from ground surveys and USN air photos, 1960–63. Named by US-ACAN for Herbert O. Kelley, radioman with the Byrd Station winter party in 1958.

=== Reynolds Nunatak ===
85°33′S 149°40′W. A nunatak at the south side of the terminus of Leverett Glacier, 12 nautical miles (22 km; 14 mi) north of Mount Herr. Mapped by USGS from ground surveys and USN air photos, 1960–63. Named by US-ACAN for Clifford E. Reynolds, electrician with the Byrd Station winter party in 1957.

== Sources ==
- Alberts, Fred G., ed. (1995), Geographic Names of the Antarctic (PDF) (2 ed.), United States Board on Geographic Names This article incorporates public domain material from websites or documents of the United States Board on Geographic Names.
- Fegyveresi, John M. (October 2017), The Potential Risks and Future Impact of a Large Leverett Glacier Crevasse along the South Pole Traverse (SPoT) (PDF), National Science Foundation, Office of Polar Programs
- Leverett Glacier, USGS: United States Geological Survey
- Mount Blackburn, USGS: United States Geological Survey
- Sailing Directions for Antarctica: Including the Off-Lying Islands South of Latitude 60 Degrees S. (2 ed.), United States. Hydrographic Office, 1960 This article incorporates public domain material from websites or documents of the United States Hydrographic Office.
- Scott, Michon (30 August 2005), "Out of the Crevasse Field : Feature Articles", earthobservatory.nasa.gov

This article incorporates public domain material from websites or documents of the United States Geological Survey.
