= Mount Howe =

Mountain in Marie Byrd Land, Antarctica

Mount Howe (87°22′S 149°30′W) is an elongated mountain in Antarctica, 2,930 metres (9,600 ft) high, comprising low connecting ridges and gable-shaped nunataks. It rises at the east side of Scott Glacier, near the head, directly opposite Mount McIntyre. This mountain, including its small southern outlier, apparently is the southernmost mountain in the world. It was discovered in December 1934 by the Byrd Antarctic Expedition geological party led by Quin Blackburn, and was named by Admiral Byrd for Louis McHenry Howe, secretary to the President of the United States at that time, Franklin D. Roosevelt.

Mount Howe harbours the southernmost known indigenous life — a colony of bacteria and yeasts. All bacteria and other life on the ice as far south as the pole appear to be weather deposited strays. The Mount Howe area has the closest blue ice runway to the South Pole (an area with no net annual snow accumulation with an ice surface capable of supporting aircraft landing on wheels instead of skis).
