= Tapley Mountains =

Mountain range in Marie Byrd Land, Antarctica

- Location within Antarctica

Highest point
- Elevation: 1,459 m (4,787 ft)

Geography
- Continent: Antarctica
- Area: Marie Byrd Land
- Range coordinates: 85°45′S 149°00′W
- Parent range: Queen Maud Mountains

The Tapley Mountains (85°45′S 149°00′W) is a range of mountains fronting on the eastern side of the Scott Glacier, extending eastward for 35 nautical miles (65 km; 40 mi) between Leverett Glacier and Albanus Glacier in the Queen Maud Mountains of Antarctica.

== Discovery and naming ==
The Tapley Mountains were discovered in December 1929 by the Richard E. Byrd Antarctic Expedition geological party under Laurence McKinley Gould. They were named by Byrd for Harold Tapley of Dunedin, New Zealand, agent for the Byrd Antarctic Expedition of 1928–30 and 1933–35.

== Location ==
The western end of the Tapley Mountains runs along the lower end of the Scott Glacier, and the Ross Ice Shelf to the north. The mountains are to the north of the Albanus Glacier, a tributary of the Scott Glacier. The Roe Glacier, another tributary of the Scott Glacier, runs northwest through the western Tapley Mountains. Features in the west include Bobo Ridge, Mount Hamilton, Mount Seebeck, Mount Stahlman, Mount Wallace, and (south of Roe Glacier) Mount Bushnell, Mount Durham, Durham Point and Pincer Point. Features to the east, between Albanus Glacier and Leverett Glacier, include Welch Peak, Mount Herr, Mount Gould, Mount Andes and Evans Butte.

Many of the features were mapped by the United States Geological Survey from ground surveys and United States Navy air photos, 1960-63.

== Western features ==
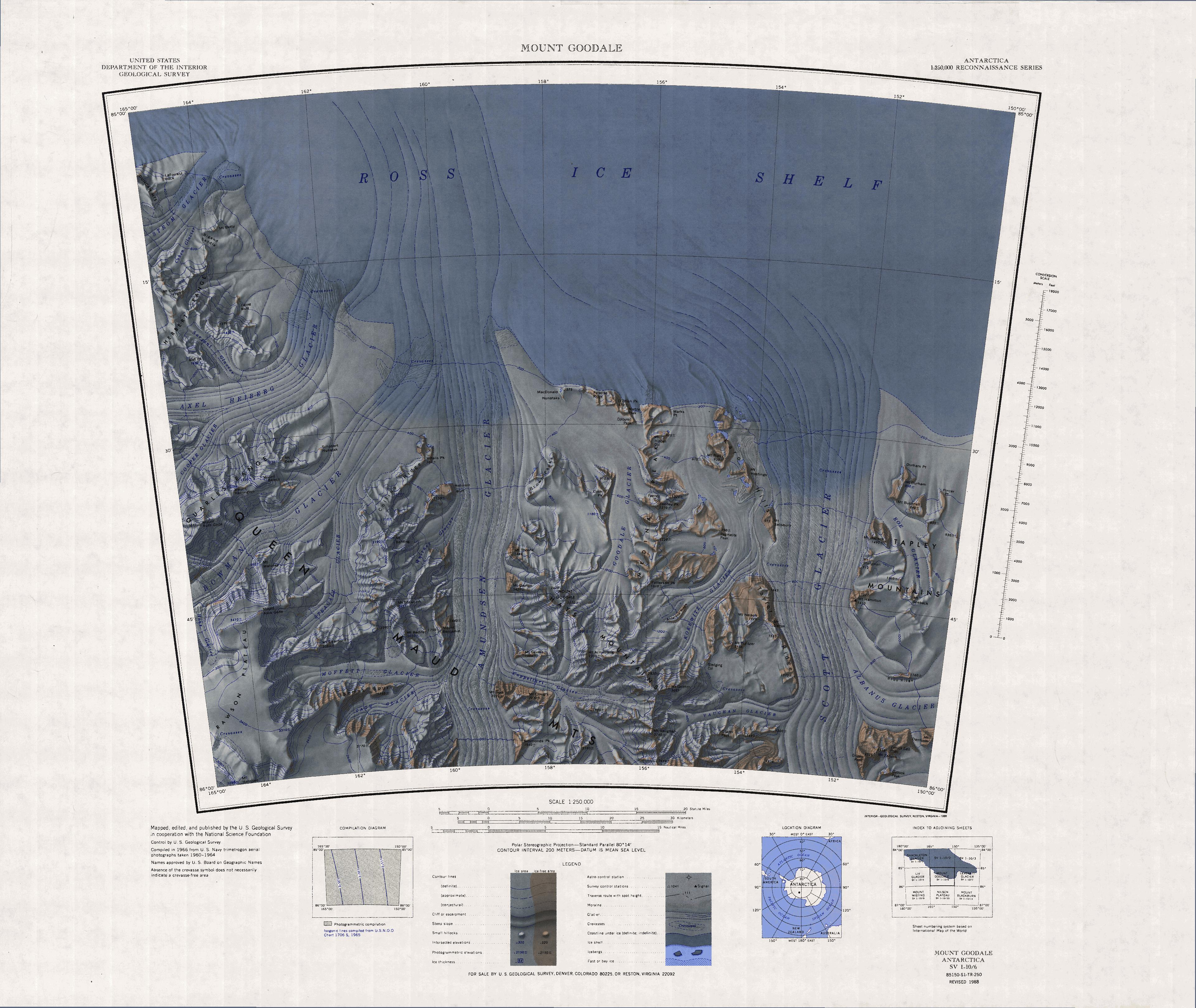
Western Tapley Mountains in southeast of map

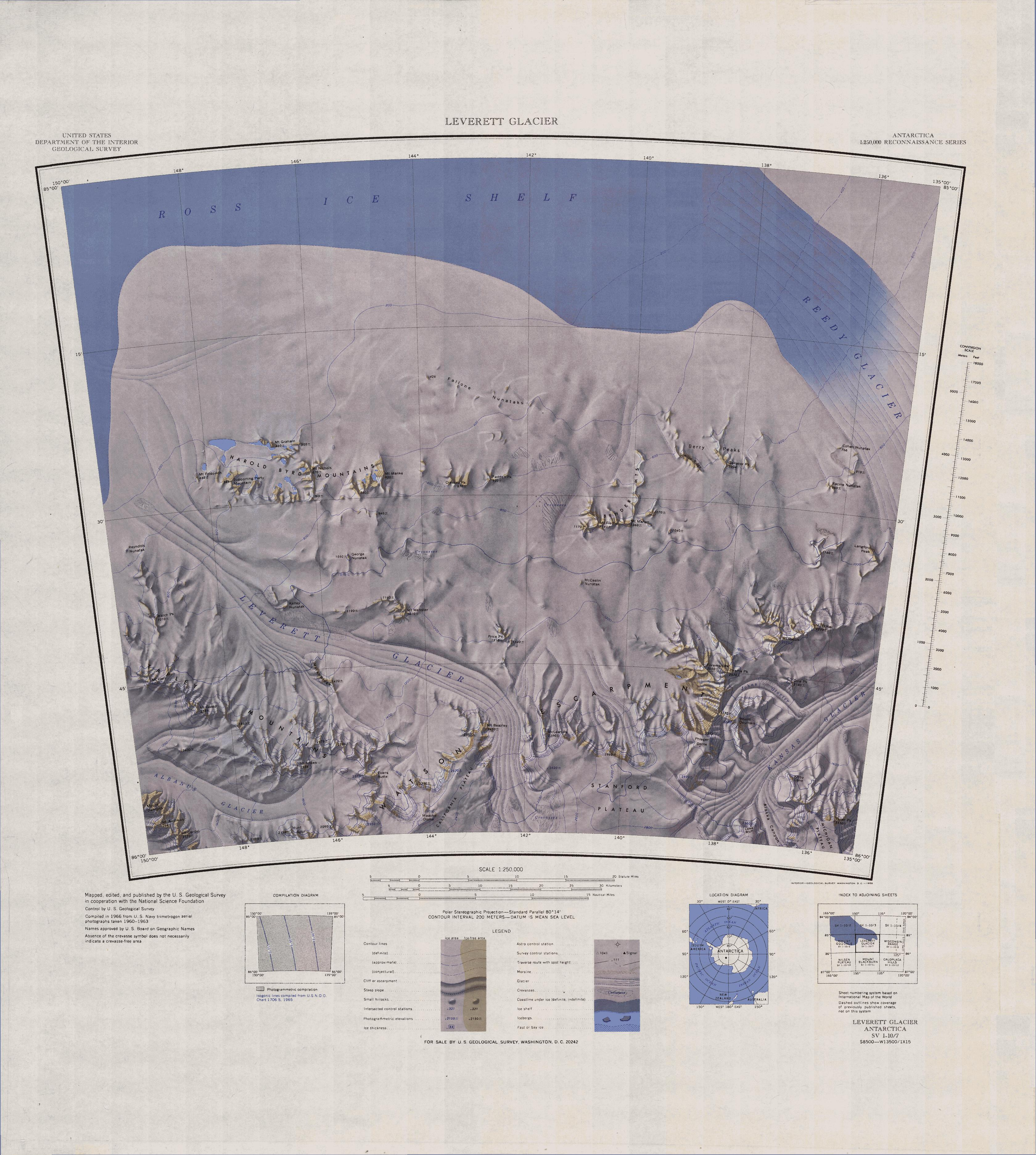
eastern Tapley Mountains in southwest of map

Features of the western end of the range, from south to north, include:

=== Bobo Ridge ===
85°51′S 150°48′W. An isolated rock ridge 2 nautical miles (3.7 km; 2.3 mi) long, extending west along the north side of Albanus Glacier and marking the southwest extremity of the Tapley Mountains. First roughly mapped by the Byrd Antarctic Expedition, 1933-35. Named by US-ACAN for Robert Bobo, meteorologist with the McMurdo Station winter party of 1963.

=== Mount Hamilton ===
85°44′S 151°53′W. A mountain 1,410 metres (4,630 ft) high, which marks the west end of the Tapley Mountains, standing at the east side of the lower reaches of Scott Glacier. First observed by the Byrd Antarctic Expedition geological party under Laurence Gould in December 1929. Visited in December 1934 by the Byrd Antarctic Expedition geological party under Quin Blackburn, and named by Byrd for G.C. Hamilton, general manager of the McClatchy newspapers, of Sacramento, CA, who was a contributor to the expedition.

=== Mount Seebeck ===
85°44′S 150°46′W. A mountain standing directly at the head of Roe Glacier in the Tapley Mountains. Named by US-ACAN for Richard L. Seebeck, station engineer at McMurdo Station, winter party, 1962.

=== Mount Stahlman ===
85°41′S 150°36′W. A mountain over 1,000 metres (3,300 ft) high, rising at the east flank of Scott Glacier between Mount Wallace and Mount Hamilton, at the west end of the Tapley Mountains. First observed in December 1929 by the Byrd Antarctic Expedition geological party under Laurence Gould. Visited in December 1934 by the Byrd Antarctic Expedition geological party under Quin Blackburn, and named by Byrd for James G. Stahlman, newspaper publisher of Nashville, Tennessee, a supporter of the expedition.

=== Mount Wallace ===
85°39′S 151°24′W. One of the Tapley Mountains, 1,490 metres (4,890 ft) high, standing at the south side of the mouth of Roe Glacier at the juncture with Scott Glacier. Named by US-ACAN for J. Allen Wallace, Jr., meteorologist, South Pole Station winter party, 1960.

=== Mount Bushnell ===
85°36′S 150°48′W. Mountain, 840 metres (2,760 ft) high, between Mount Durham and Pincer Point in the northwest part of Tapley Mountains. First roughly mapped by the Byrd Antarctic Expedition, 1928-30. Named by US-ACAN for Vivian C. Bushnell of the American Geographical Society, editor of the Society's Antarctic Map Folio Series.

=== Mount Durham ===
85°33′S 151°12′W. A mainly ice-free mountain, 860 metres (2,820 ft) high, standing at the east side of the mouth of Scott Glacier and marking the northwest limit of the Tapley Mountains. First observed in December 1929 by the Byrd Antarctic Expedition geological party under Laurence Gould. The mountain was climbed in December 1934 by the Byrd Antarctic Expedition geological party under Quin Blackburn, and was named by Byrd after Durham, NH, seat of the University of New Hampshire and home of Stuart D.L. Paine, a member of the latter party.

=== Durham Point ===
85°32′S 151°12′W. A small rock spur extending north from Mount Durham at the northwest end of the Tapley Mountains. The feature was visited in December 1934 by the Byrd Antarctic Expedition geological party under Quin Blackburn, and named in association with Mount Durham.

=== Pincer Point ===
85°34′S 150°30′W. A narrow rock point lying 4 nautical miles (7.4 km; 4.6 mi) east-southeast of Durham Point, near the northwest end of the Tapley Mountains. First seen and roughly mapped by the Byrd Antarctic Expedition, 1928-30. So named by US-ACAN because its appearance is similar to a part of a pincers.

== Eastern features ==
Features of the eastern part of the range, from west to east, include:

=== Welch Peak ===
85°39′S 149°15′W. Peak, 1,010 metres (3,310 ft) high, standing at the north side of the Tapley Mountains, 9 nautical miles (17 km; 10 mi) northwest of Mount Gould. Named by US-ACAN for Walton D. Welch, electronics technician with the Byrd Station winter party in 1957.

=== Mount Herr ===
85°45′S 149°32′W. A peak, 1,730 metres (5,680 ft) high, located 5 nautical miles (9.3 km; 5.8 mi) northwest of Mount Gould. Named by US-ACAN after Lt. Arthur L. Herr, Jr., aircraft commander with United States Navy Squadron VX-6 at McMurdo Station, 1962-63 and 1963-64.

=== Mount Gould ===
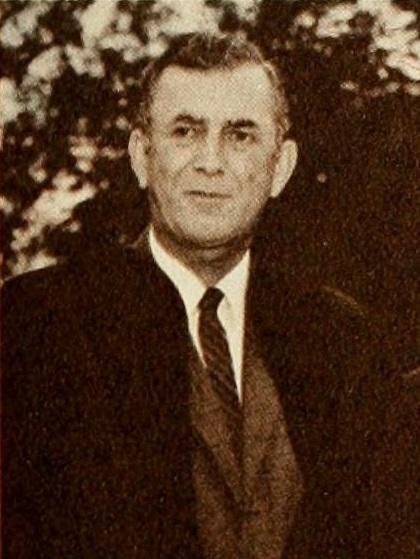
Laurence M. Gould

85°48′S 148°40′W. A prominent mountain, 2,385 metres (7,825 ft) high, surmounting the central part of the Tapley Mountains. Discovered in December 1929 by the Byrd Antarctic Expedition geological party under Laurence Gould. Named by Byrd for president Laurence McKinley Gould of Carleton College, polar explorer, who served as geologist and second in command of the Byrd Antarctic Expedition, 1928-30. From 1955-70, Gould was a leader in the planning of the U.S. Antarctic Research Program, and has served as chairman of the National Academy of Sciences Committee on Polar Research, and chairman of the international Scientific Committee on Antarctic Research.

=== Mount Andes ===
85°53′S 146°46′W. Peak, 2,525 metres (8,284 ft) high, in the southeast part of the Tapley Mountains. Named by US-ACAN for Lt. Cdr. Paul G. Andes, United States Navy, pilot at McMurdo Station, 1962-63 and 1963-64.

=== Evans Butte ===
85°55′S 145°16′W. Prominent snow-topped butte, 2,570 metres (8,430 ft) high, standing at the head of Albanus Glacier and marking the southeast limit of the Tapley Mountains. Named by US-ACAN for Lt. Eldon L. Evans, United States Navy, medical officer of the Byrd Station winter party, 1962.

== Sources ==
- Alberts, Fred G., ed. (1995), Geographic Names of the Antarctic (PDF) (2 ed.), United States Board on Geographic Names This article incorporates public domain material from websites or documents of the United States Board on Geographic Names.
- Leverett Glacier, USGS: United States Geological Survey
- Mount Goodale, USGS: United States Geological Survey
- This article incorporates public domain material from websites or documents of the United States Geological Survey.
