= Scott G. Borg =

American geologist and civil servant

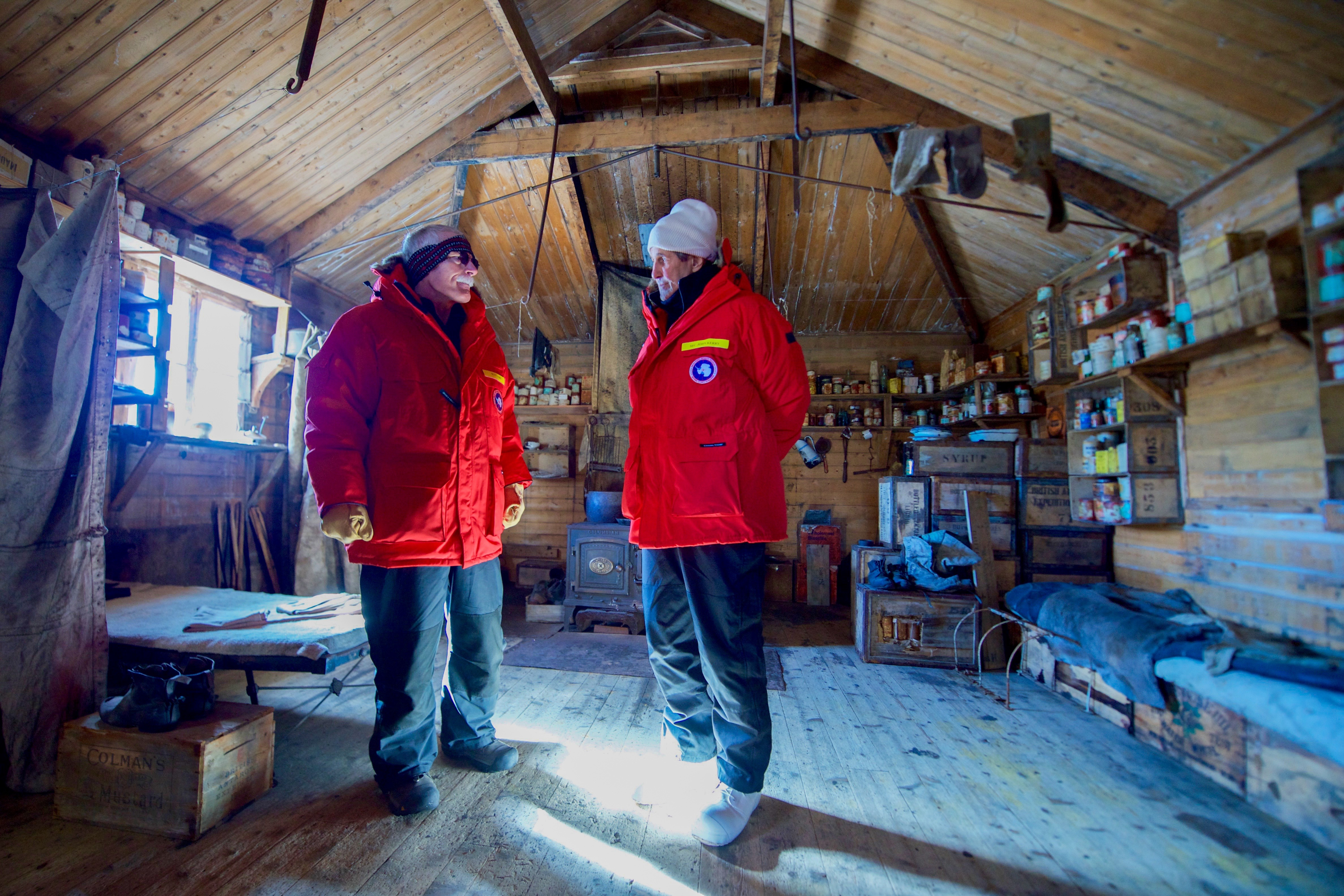
Scott Borg (left) with John Kerry in Antarctica in 2015

Scott G. Borg is an American geologist and civil servant. Since 1 September 2017 he has been the Deputy Assistant Director of the Directorate for Geosciences at the United States' National Science Foundation (NSF).

== Education ==
Borg graduated from Pomona College with a B.A. in geology, and earned M.S. and Ph.D. degrees from Arizona State University, where his doctoral dissertation was titled Granitoids of Northern Victoria Land, Antarctica (Tectonics, Neodymium-isotopes, Geochemistry, Petrology, Strontium-isotopes).

== Career ==
He began his career as a researcher at the University of California at Berkeley. He later worked for the United States Department of Energy, and subsequently joined the staff of the National Science Foundation. Between 2003 and 2016 he was director of the Division of Antarctic Sciences at the National Science Foundation, and in 2016-17 he served as the acting Section Head for Antarctic Infrastructure and Logistics (AIL) within the National Science Foundation Division of Polar Programs. In 2017, he began serving as associate director for geosciences at the National Science Foundation.

== Research expeditions ==
Borg has participated in a total of six research expeditions to Antarctica, four of which he has led. During a 1978–1979 expedition in which he participated, the Sagehen Nunataks were first visited, receiving their name from the Pomona Sagehens, athletic moniker of Borg's alma mater Pomona College. During the same expedition, Borg named Tongue Peak, choosing the name from a tongue-shaped moraine on the peak.

== Awards and honors ==
In 1994, Borg Bastion, the summit on Johns Hopkins Ridge, was named in his honor. Borg has received the Samuel J. Heyman Medal from the Partnership for Public Service and been decorated with the Presidential Rank Award of Distinguished Executive. In 2014, United States Representative Gerald Connolly read a statement of recognition into the Congressional Record in which he credited Borg with overseeing "the development of clean drilling technology that retrieved the first-ever pure water samples from an Antarctic lake a half mile below the surface of ice sheet ... [which] may enable researchers to understand what types of life can survive on other worlds".
