= Karo Hills =

Hills in Antarctica

- Location within Antarctica

Geography
- Continent: Antarctica
- Region: Ross Dependency
- Range coordinates: 85°34′S 154°10′W

The Karo Hills (85°34′S 154°10′W) are rounded, ice-free foothills in Antarctica extending for 12 nautical miles (22 km; 14 mi) along the west side of the terminus of Scott Glacier, from Mount Salisbury north-northwest to the edge of the Ross Ice Shelf.

== Discovery and naming ==
The Karo Hills were first seen and roughly mapped by the Byrd Antarctic Expedition between 1928 and 1930, and were named by the Advisory Committee on Antarctic Names for Vice Admiral Henry Arnold Karo, Director of the United States Coast and Geodetic Survey from 1955 to 1965 and Deputy Director of the U.S. Environmental Science Services Administration from 1965 to 1967.

== Location ==
The Karo Hills run north-northeast from Mount Salisbury in the south, separating the Koerwitz Glacier to the west from the Scott Glacier to the east. Other peaks include Mount Hastings and Mount Rigby.

== Features ==
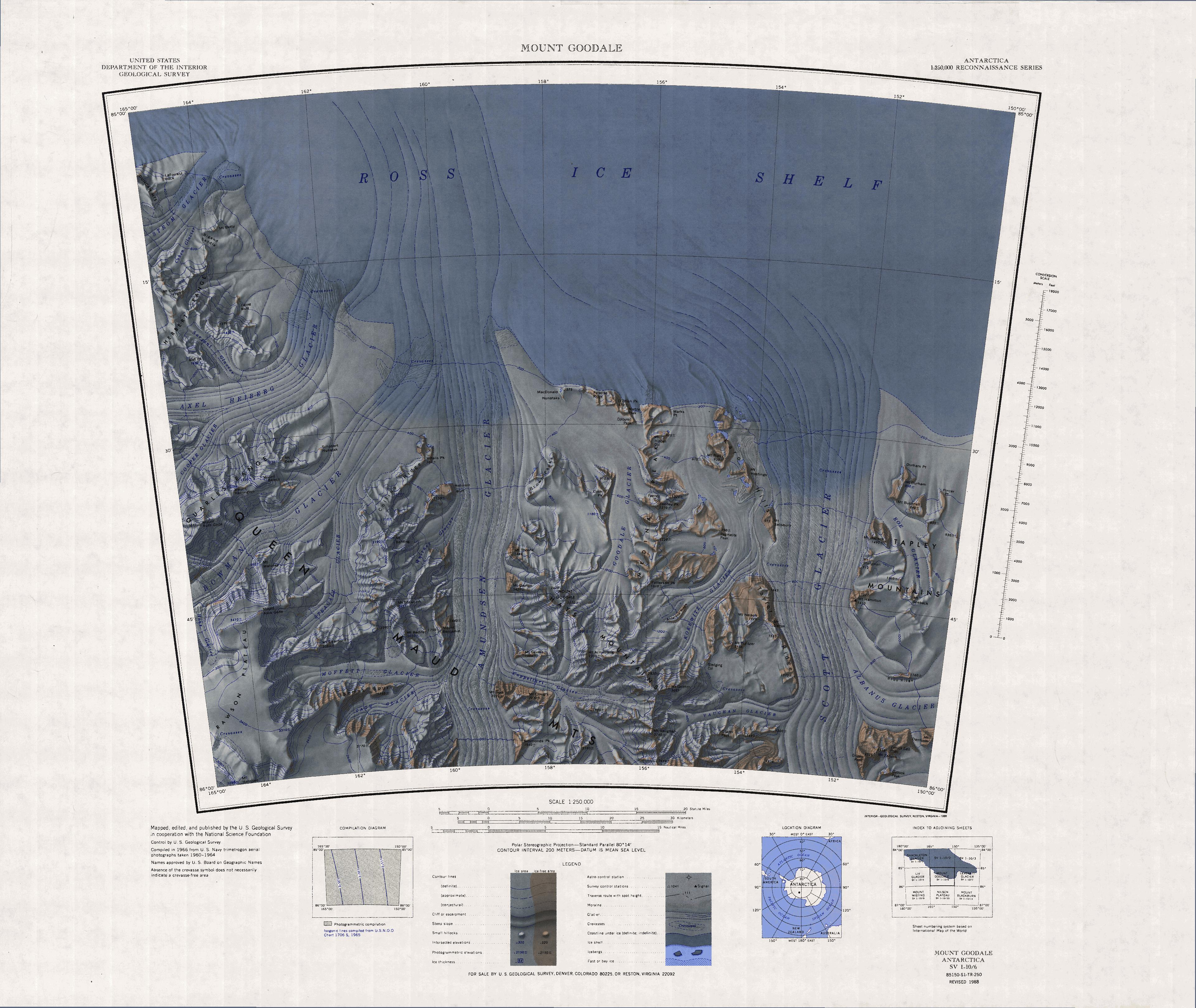
Karo Hills in the northeast of map

=== Mount Salisbury ===
85°38′S 153°37′W. An ice-free mountain, 970 metres (3,180 ft) high, standing at the west side of the lower Scott Glacier at the south end of the Karo Hills. First seen and roughly mapped by the Byrd Antarctic Expedition, 1928-30. Named by the United States Advisory Committee on Antarctic Names (US-ACAN) for James B. Salisbury who made cosmic radiation studies at McMurdo Station in 1965.

=== Mount Hastings ===
85°34′S 154°10′W. A low mountain 2 nautical miles (3.7 km; 2.3 mi) southeast of Mount Rigby in the Karo Hills, at the west side of Scott Glacier. First sighted by the Byrd Antarctic Expedition, 1928–30. Named by US-ACAN for James V. Hastings who carried out geomagnetic studies at McMurdo Station, summer 1964-65.

=== Mount Rigby ===
85°33′S 154°35′W. A mountain, 950 metres (3,120 ft) high, standing 2 nautical miles (3.7 km; 2.3 mi) northwest of Mount Hastings, just west of the mouth of Scott Glacier. First observed and roughly mapped by the Byrd Antarctic Expedition, 1928-30. Named by US-ACAN for John F. Rigby, geologist at McMurdo Station, summer 1965-66.

== Sources ==
- Alberts, Fred G., ed. (1995), Geographic Names of the Antarctic (PDF) (2 ed.), United States Board on Geographic Names This article incorporates public domain material from websites or documents of the United States Board on Geographic Names.
- Mount Goodale, USGS: United States Geological Survey

This article incorporates public domain material from websites or documents of the United States Geological Survey.
