= La Gorce Mountains =

Mountain range in Marie Byrd Land, Antarctica

- Location within Antarctica

Geography
- Continent: Antarctica
- Region: Ross Dependency
- Range coordinates: 86°45′S 146°0′W
- Parent range: Queen Maud Mountains

The La Gorce Mountains (86°45′S 146°0′W) are a group of mountains, 20 nautical miles (37 km; 23 mi) long, standing between the tributary Robison Glacier and Klein Glacier at the east side of the upper reaches of the Scott Glacier, in the Queen Maud Mountains of Antarctica.

== Discovery and naming ==
The La Gorce Mountains were discovered in December 1934 by the Byrd Antarctic Expedition geological party under Quin Blackburn, and named by Richard E. Byrd for John Oliver La Gorce, Vice President of the National Geographic Society.

== Location ==
The La Gorce Mountains are to the east of the head of the Scott Glacier where it is joined from the southeast by the Klein Glacier. The Robison Glacier flows west along the north of the La Gorce Mountains to join the Scott Glacier. The northwest of the mountains is defined by the Ackerman Ridge, Surprise Spur, Delta Peak and Mount Mooney. Further south are the Gjertsen Promontory and Mount Gjertsen, the Waterhouse Spur, Hourglass Buttress and Beard Peak. South of Mount Gjertsen are Mount Grier, Goldstream Peak and Johansen Peak. Mount Paine and Kessens Peak are in the extreme south.

Isolated features to the southwest are the Davis Hills and Gardner Ridge. The Graves Nunataks are to the east.

== Features ==
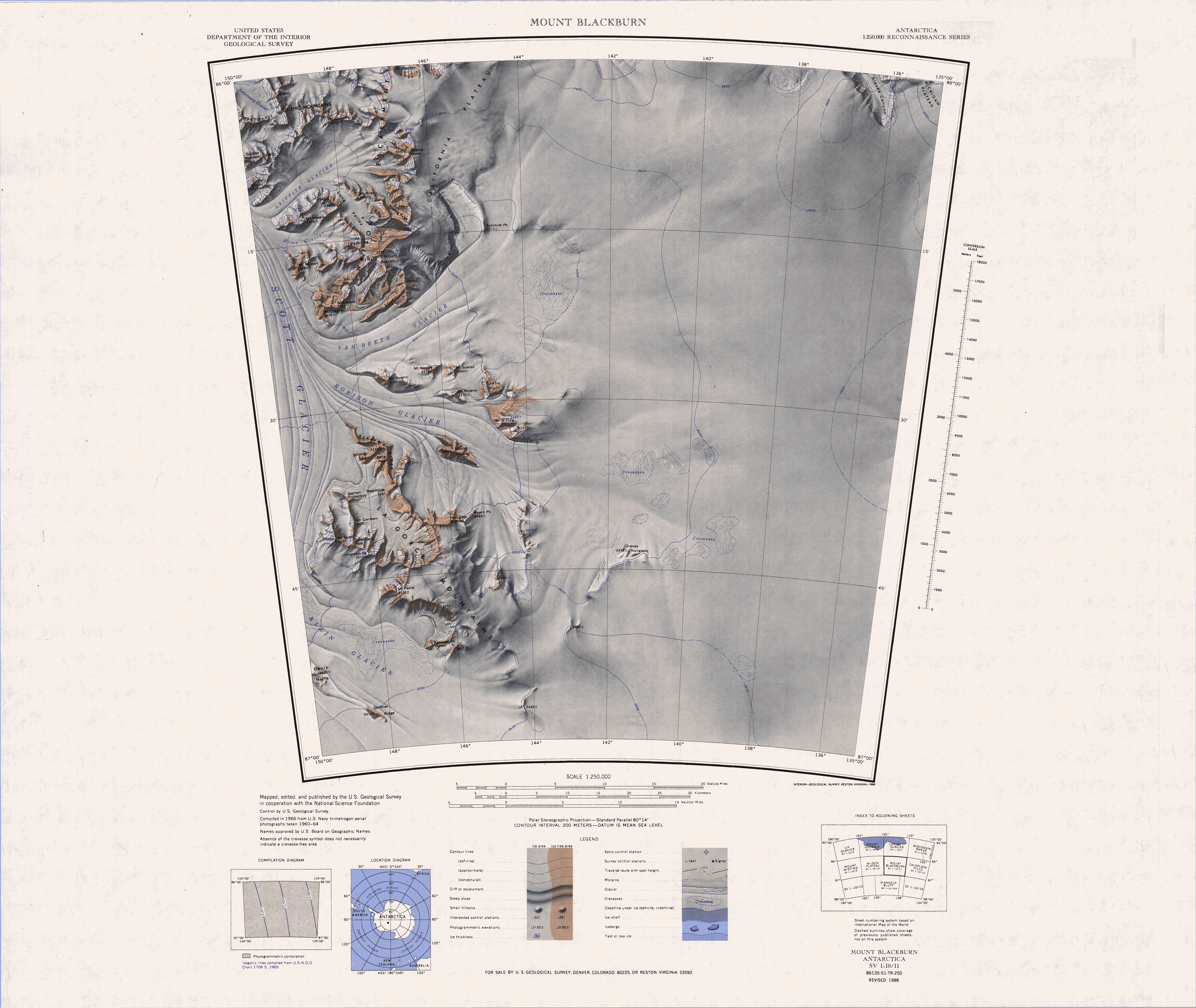
La Gorce Mountains to the southwest of map

=== Ackerman Ridge ===
86°34′S 147°30′W. A prominent rock ridge forming the northwest extremity of the La Gorce Mountains of the Queen Maud Mountains. Discovered and roughly mapped in December 1934 by the Byrd Antarctic Expedition geological party under Quin Blackburn. Named by United States Advisory Committee on Antarctic Names (US-ACAN) for Lieutenant Ronnie J. Ackerman, navigator of USN Squadron VX-6 during Operation Deep Freeze 1965 and 1966.

=== Surprise Spur ===
86°34′S 147°50′W. A prominent spur, the northernmost of three spurs on the southwest side of Ackerman Ridge. First mapped by the United States Geological Survey (USGS) from surveys and United States Navy air photos, 1960-64. So named by the New Zealand Geological Survey Antarctic Expedition (NZGSAE) (1969-70) because, in the middle of an extensive region of purely basement rocks, slightly altered sedimentary rocks which seem to belong to the much younger Beacon series appear on this spur.

=== Delta Peak ===
86°35′S 147°30′W. A very sharp peak marking a pronounced corner point on Ackerman Ridge, 6 nautical miles (11 km; 6.9 mi) northeast of Mount Gjertsen. Mapped by USGS from surveys and United States Navy air photos, 1960-64. So named by NZGSAE, 1969-70, because as seen from the south the colorful rock strata present a well visible form that is suggestive of the Greek letter "Delta."

=== Gjertsen Promontory ===
86°38′S 148°32′W. A low but sharply rising promontory at the extremity of the spur trending north from Mount Gjertsen, in the La Gorce Mountains. The feature was mapped by USGS from surveys and United States Navy air photos, 1960-64. Named by NZGSAE, 1969-70, in association with Mount Gjertsen.

=== Mount Gjertsen ===
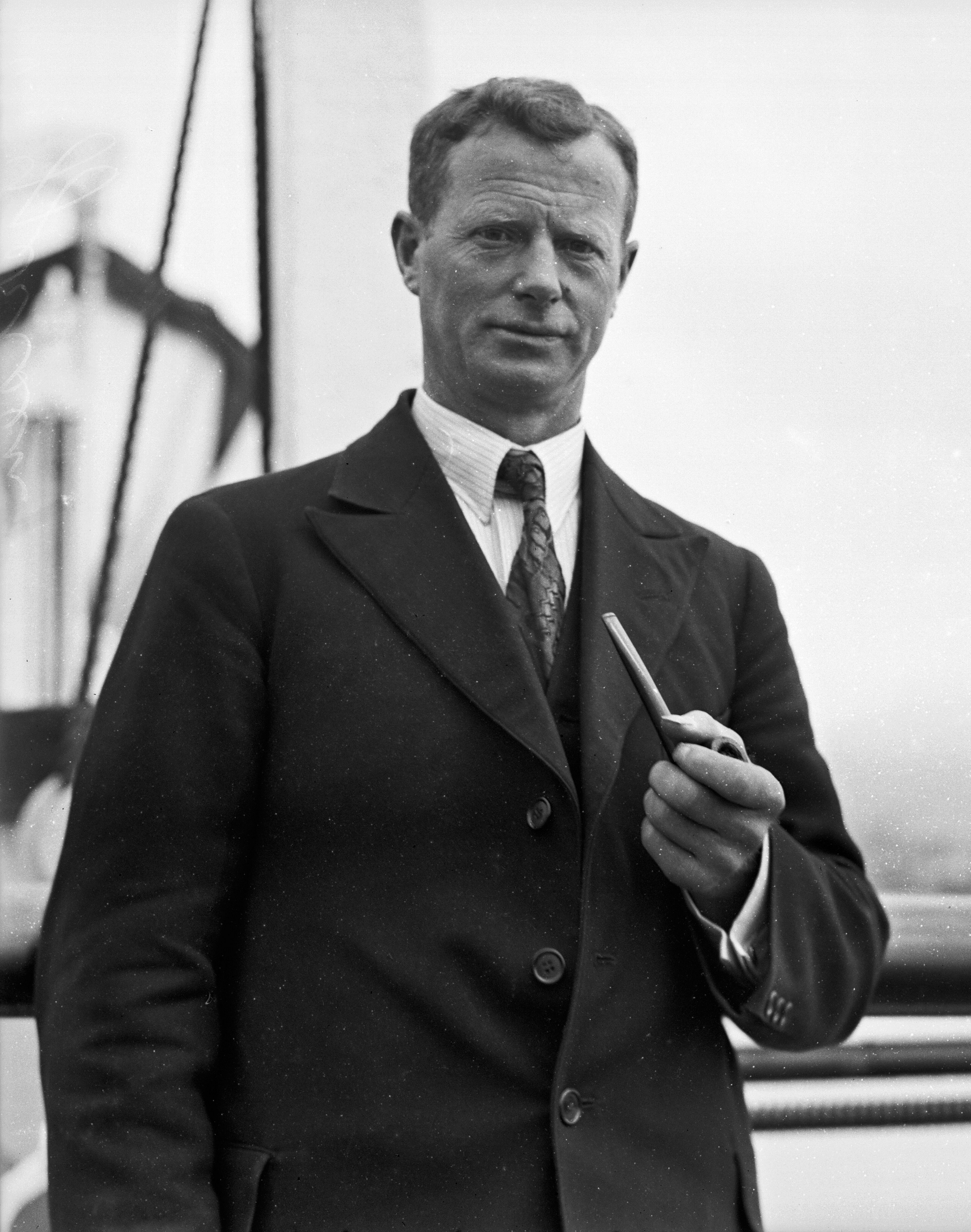
Commander Hjlamar Frederik Gjertsen returns from the Byrd expedition 1934

86°40′S 148°27′W. A mountain, 2,420 metres (7,940 ft) high, standing 2 nautical miles (3.7 km; 2.3 mi) northeast of Mount Grier in the La Gorce Mountains. Discovered in December 1934 by the Byrd Antarctic Expedition geological party under Quin Blackburn. So named in an attempt to reconcile Byrd's discoveries with the names applied by Roald Amundsen in 1911-12. Amundsen had named a mountain in the general vicinity for Lieutenant Hjlamar Frederik Gjertsen of the Norwegian Navy, who was second mate on Amundsen's ship Fram and later ice pilot for the Byrd Antarctic Expedition, 1933-35.

=== Waterhouse Spur ===
86°37′S 147°25′W. A spur of well-exposed strata that juts southwest from the south portion of Ackerman Ridge, 6 nautical miles (11 km; 6.9 mi) northeast of Johansen Peak, in the La Gorce Mountains. First mapped by USGS from surveys and United States Navy air photos, 1960-64. Named by NZGSAE, 1969-70, for Barry C. Waterhouse, a member of the geological party who worked here.

=== Hourglass Buttress ===
86°40′S 146°28′W. A rock buttress, rising to 2,790 metres (9,150 ft) high, 3.5 nautical miles (6.5 km; 4.0 mi) W of Beard Peak in the La Gorce Mountains. Mapped by the USGS from surveys and United States Navy aerial photographs, 1960-64. Geologically mapped by a USARP-Arizona State University geological party, 1980-81. The name derives from a long snow chute up the face of the buttress.

=== Beard Peak ===
86°40′S 145°25′W. A peak, 2,360 metres (7,740 ft) high, along the north edge of the La Gorce Mountains, standing 4 nautical miles (7.4 km; 4.6 mi) south of the east tip of Mount Mooney. Mapped by USGS from surveys and USN air photos, 1960-63. Named by US-ACAN for Philip H. Beard, photographer with USN Squadron VX-6 during Operation Deep Freeze 1966 and 1967.

=== Mount Grier ===
86°41′S 148°57′W. A prominent mountain, 3,035 metres (9,957 ft) high, standing at the east side of the Scott Glacier where it forms the westernmost summit of the La Gorce Mountains. Discovered in December 1934 by the Byrd Antarctic Expedition geological party under Quin Blackburn. Named by Byrd for Dr. G. Layton Grier, head of the L.D. Caulk Co. of Milford, DE, who contributed dental supplies to the Byrd Antarctic Expedition of 1928-30 and 1933-35.

=== Goldstream Peak ===
86°41′S 148°30′W. A peak rising to c. 2,800 metres (9,200 ft) high at the junction of ridges from Mount Gjertsen, Mount Grier, and Johansen Peak. The peak was geologically mapped by a USARP Arizona State University field party, 1980-81, and named by Edmund Stump, leader of the party. The name derives from a contact between shallow intrusions on the W face of the peak, which has produced gold, yellow, and brown coloration along a meandering line.

=== Johansen Peak ===
86°43′S 148°11′W. A prominent peak, 3,310 metres (10,860 ft) high, standing 3 nautical miles (5.6 km; 3.5 mi) east-southeast of Mount Grier. Discovered by R. Admiral Byrd on the South Pole Flight of Nov. 28-29, 1929, and mapped in December 1934 by the Byrd Antarctic Expedition geological party under Quin Blackburn. So named in an attempt to reconcile Byrd's discoveries with the names applied by Roald Amundsen in 1911. Amundsen had named a peak in the general vicinity for Hjalmar Johansen, a member of the Eastern Sledge Party of his 1910-12 expedition.

=== Mount Paine ===
86°46′S 147°32′W. A massive, flat-topped mountain, 3,330 metres (10,930 ft) high, forming a buttress-type projection of the western part of the La Gorce Mountains. Discovered in December 1934 by the Byrd Antarctic Expedition geological party under Quin Blackburn, and named by Byrd for Stuart D.L. Paine, navigator and radio operator of that party.

=== Kessens Peak ===
86°51′S 146°41′W. A peak, 2,660 metres (8,730 ft) high, located 5 nautical miles (9.3 km; 5.8 mi) southeast of Mount Paine. Mapped by USGS from surveys and USN air photos, 1960-63. Named by US-ACAN for Gerard R. Kessens of USN Squadron VX-6, photographer on Operation Deep Freeze 1966 and 1967.

== Features to the north ==
Several features are in or just north of Robison Glacier where it converges with Van Reeth Glacier. They include Mount Bowlin, Mount Noville, Mount Suarez, Mount Roland, Szabo Bluff and Price Bluff.

=== Mount Mooney ===
86°34′S 145°48′W. A ridge-shaped mountain, 2,850 metres (9,350 ft) high, standing just north of the La Gorce Mountains, where it rises above the middle of Robison Glacier. Discovered in December 1934 by the Byrd Antarctic Expedition geological party under Quin Blackburn, and named by R. Admiral Byrd for James E. Mooney, who assisted this and later Byrd expeditions. From 1959-65, Mooney served as Deputy United States Antarctic Projects Officer.

=== Mount Bowlin ===
86°28′S 147°18′W. A mountain, 2,230 metres (7,320 ft) standing between the mouths of Van Reeth and Robison Glaciers. Discovered in December 1934 by the ByrdAE geological party under Quin Blackburn, and named by Byrd for William H. Bowlin, airplane pilot with the expedition.

=== Mount Noville ===
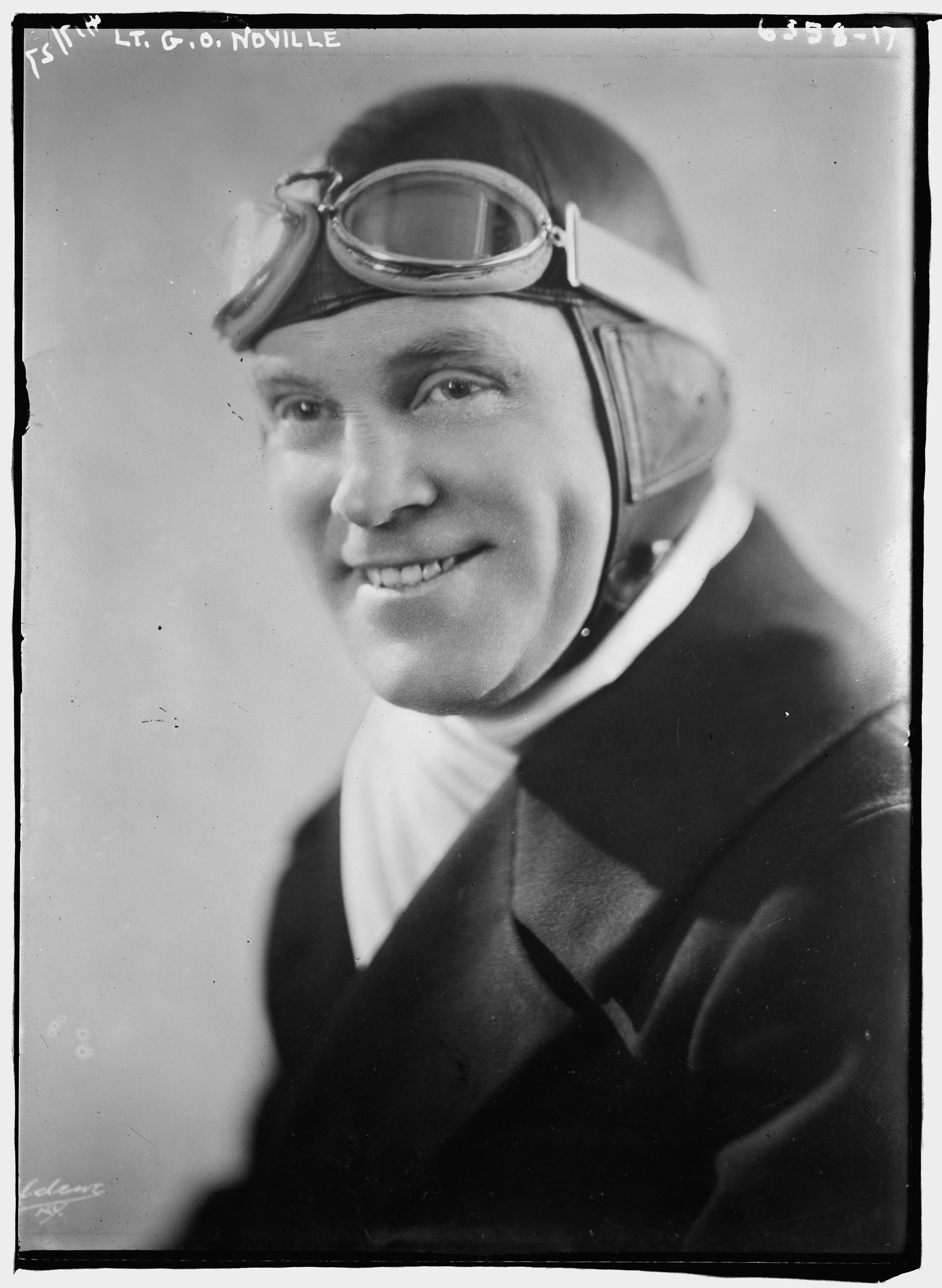
George Otto Noville

86°27′S 146°10′W. A mountain, 2,410 metres (7,910 ft) high, standing between Van Reeth and Robison Glaciers and 4 nautical miles (7.4 km; 4.6 mi) east of Mount Bowlin. Discovered by the geological party under Quin Blackburn of the ByrdAE, 1933-35, and named by Byrd for George Otto Noville, executive officer of the expedition.

=== Mount Suarez ===
86°27′S 145°42′W. A mountain, 2,360 metres (7,740 ft) high, standing just east of Mount Noville on the divide between Van Reeth and Robison Glaciers. Mapped by USGS from surveys and USN air photos, 1960-64. Named by US-ACAN for Lt. (j.g.) Ralph Suarez, aircraft navigator of USN Squadron VX-6 on Operation Deep Freeze 1965, 1966 and 1967.

=== Mount Roland ===
86°29′S 145°42′W. A mountain, 2,210 metres (7,250 ft) high, directly north of Mount Mooney on the north flank of Robison Glacier. Mapped by USGS from surveys and USN air photos, 1960-64. Named by US-ACAN for Lt. (j-g-) Charles J. Roland, aircraft navigator with USN Squadron VX-6 on Operation Deep Freeze 1966 and 1967.

=== Szabo Bluff ===
86°29′S 144°48′W. A bluff standing just north of Price Bluff on the divide between Van Reeth and Robison Glaciers. Mapped by USGS from surveys and USN air photos, 1960-64. Named by US-ACAN for Lt. Alex J. Szabo, aircraft pilot of USN Squadron VX-6 during Operation Deep Freeze 1966 and 1967.

=== Price Bluff ===
86°32′S 144°34′W. A large bluff 5 nautical miles (9.3 km; 5.8 mi) northeast of Mount Mooney, standing near the head of Robison Glacier. Mapped by USGS from surveys and USN air photos, 1960-64. Named by US-ACAN for Lt. Robert P. Price, USN, photographic officer who served as inflight observer on many photographic missions during Operation Deep Freeze 1965 and 1966.

== Other nearby features ==
=== Davis Hills ===
86°52′S 150°00′W. A small group of hills lying at the south side of Klein Glacier where the latter enters Scott Glacier. Mapped by USGS from surveys and USN air photos, 1960-63. Named by US-AC AN for Parker Davis, photographer with USN Squadron VX-6 in Operation Deep Freeze 1966 and 1967.

=== Gardner Ridge ===
86°57′S 148°24′W. An ice-free ridge 4 nautical miles (7.4 km; 4.6 mi) southeast of Davis Hills, lying at the south side of Klein Glacier. Mapped by USGS from surveys and USN air photos, 1960-63. Named by US-ACAN for Eric T. Gardner of USN Squadron VX-6, photographer on Operation Deep Freeze 1966 and 1967.

=== Graves Nunataks ===
86°43′S 141°30′W. Small group of nunataks near the edge of the polar plateau, lying 14 nautical miles (26 km; 16 mi) east-southeast of Beard Peak. Mapped by USGS from surveys and USN air photos, 1960-63. Named by US-ACAN for Gerald V. Graves of USN Squadron VX-6, photographer on Operation Deep Freeze 1966 and 1967.

== Sources ==
- Alberts, Fred G., ed. (1995), Geographic Names of the Antarctic (PDF) (2 ed.), United States Board on Geographic Names This article incorporates public domain material from websites or documents of the United States Board on Geographic Names.
- Mount Blackburn, USGS: United States Geological Survey

This article incorporates public domain material from websites or documents of the United States Geological Survey.
