= Scott Glacier (Transantarctic Mountains) =

Glacier in Antarctica

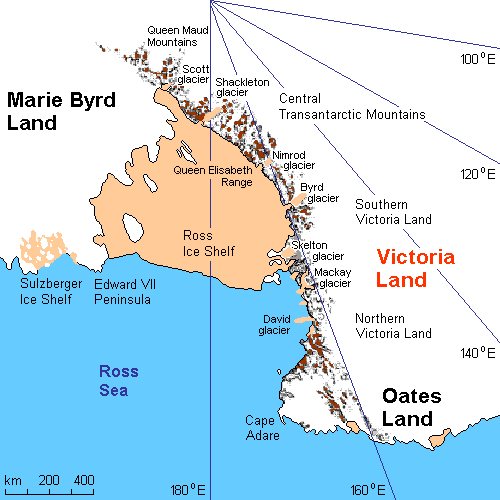
- The Scott glacier is near the top above the Ross Ice Shelf

- Location within Antarctica
- Coordinates: 85°45′S 153°0′W
- Length: 120 m (390 ft)

The Scott Glacier (85°45′S 153°0′W) is a major glacier, 120 nautical miles (220 km; 140 mi) long, that drains the East Antarctic Ice Sheet through the Queen Maud Mountains to the Ross Ice Shelf. The Scott Glacier is one of a series of major glaciers flowing across the Transantarctic Mountains, with the Amundsen Glacier to the west and the Leverett and Reedy glaciers to the east.

== Geography ==
The Scott Glacier originates on the Antarctic Plateau in the vicinity of D'Angelo Bluff and Mount Howe, and descends between the Nilsen Plateau and the mountains of the Watson Escarpment to enter Ross Ice Shelf just west of the Tapley Mountains. The Tapley Mountains, Watson Escarpment, Mount Blackburn, and the La Gorce Mountains bound the Scott Glacier on its eastern margin, while the Karo Hills, Hays Mountains, Faulkner Escarpment, and Rawson Mountains define the western edge of the Scott's drainage.

According to Sailing Directions for Antarctica (1960),"Eastward of the Amundsen Glacier the foothills are more nearly submerged beneath snow and ice, and show greater evidence of glacierization than those in the vicinity of the Axel Heiberg and Liv Glaciers. About 15 miles eastward of the Amundsen Glacier is the Robert Scott Glacier (Thorne Glacier), from 5 to 15 miles wide, trending in a north-south direction about 90 miles. Thorvald Nilsen Mountains (Mount Thorvald Nilsen) (86°W' S.,158°00' W.), a mountain massif of the Queen Maud Range, rise to elevations of about 13,000 feet and lie between the upper parts of the Scott and Amundsen Glaciers.

The Will Hays Mountains (85°57' S., 155°20' W.) also in the Queen Maud Range, surmount the divide between the lower ends of these two glaciers. Mount Thorne rises to 6,000 feet in the Will Hays Mountains. Mount Weaver (86°57' S, 152°20' W.), about 10,000 feet high, marks the southern portal of the glacier at the polar plateau. Blackburn in 1934, found at Mount Weaver extensive coal beds and fossil tree section up to 18 inches in diameter.

The eastern wall of the Robert Scott Glacier is marked by a series of isolated flat-topped mountains between which tributary glaciers drain from the polar plateau into the Thorne Valley. The eastern portal of the Robert Scott Glacier is marked by a detached land mass, about 30 miles long in a southeast-northwest direction. Southward of this massif is Albanus Glacier (Phillips Glacier), which flows westward and merges with the lower heights of Robert Scott Glacier. The Albanus Glacier and the Leverett Glacier bifurcate at the eastern extremity of the detached land mass in about 85°48' S., 146° W.

== History ==
Scott Glacier was discovered in December 1929 by the Byrd Antarctic Expedition geological party under Laurence Gould. Scott Glacier was originally called Thorne Glacier. The Scott Glacier was named by the Advisory Committee on Antarctic Names (US-ACAN) after early Antarctic explorer Robert Falcon Scott, who never saw the Scott Glacier but rather ascended the Beardmore Glacier to the west en route to the South Pole in 1911–12. It was first ski traversed in January 1990 by Martyn Williams (Canada, the leader and guide) and Jerry Corr (USA) traveling from the South Pole to the Ross Ice Shelf and then by Mike McDowell (Australia) in 1992, on a ski traverse from the South Pole to the coast. Thus Williams and Corr were the first people to traverse Antarctica under human power as described in the book The Snotsicle Traverse by Jerry Corr.

== Course ==
The Scott Glacier forms on the Polar Plateau and flows north between Mount Wilbur and the Davis Hills. The Poulter Glacier enters from the left (west) to the north of Mount Innes-Taylor. The Klein Glacier enters from the right (east) to the north of the David Hills. The Robison Glacier enters from the right to the south of Mount Bowlin and the VanReeth Glacier enters from the right to the north of Mount Bowlin. The Scott Glacier flows past the Watson Escarpment to the east, from which the Howe Glacier and Griffith Glacier join it from the right.

To the north of Mount Ruth, to the west of the Scott Glacier, the Bartlett Glacier joins from the left. Tributaries of the Bartlett Glacier include the Holdsworth Glacier and the Souchez Glacier. Further north, the Scott Glacier flows past the Tapley Mountains to the east, from which it receives the Albanus Glacier and the Roe Glacier. From the Queen Maud Mountains to the west it receives the Vaughan Glacier. The Koerwitz Glacier flows beside the Scott Glacier then pulls away at Mount Salisbury in the Karo Hills.

== Head ==
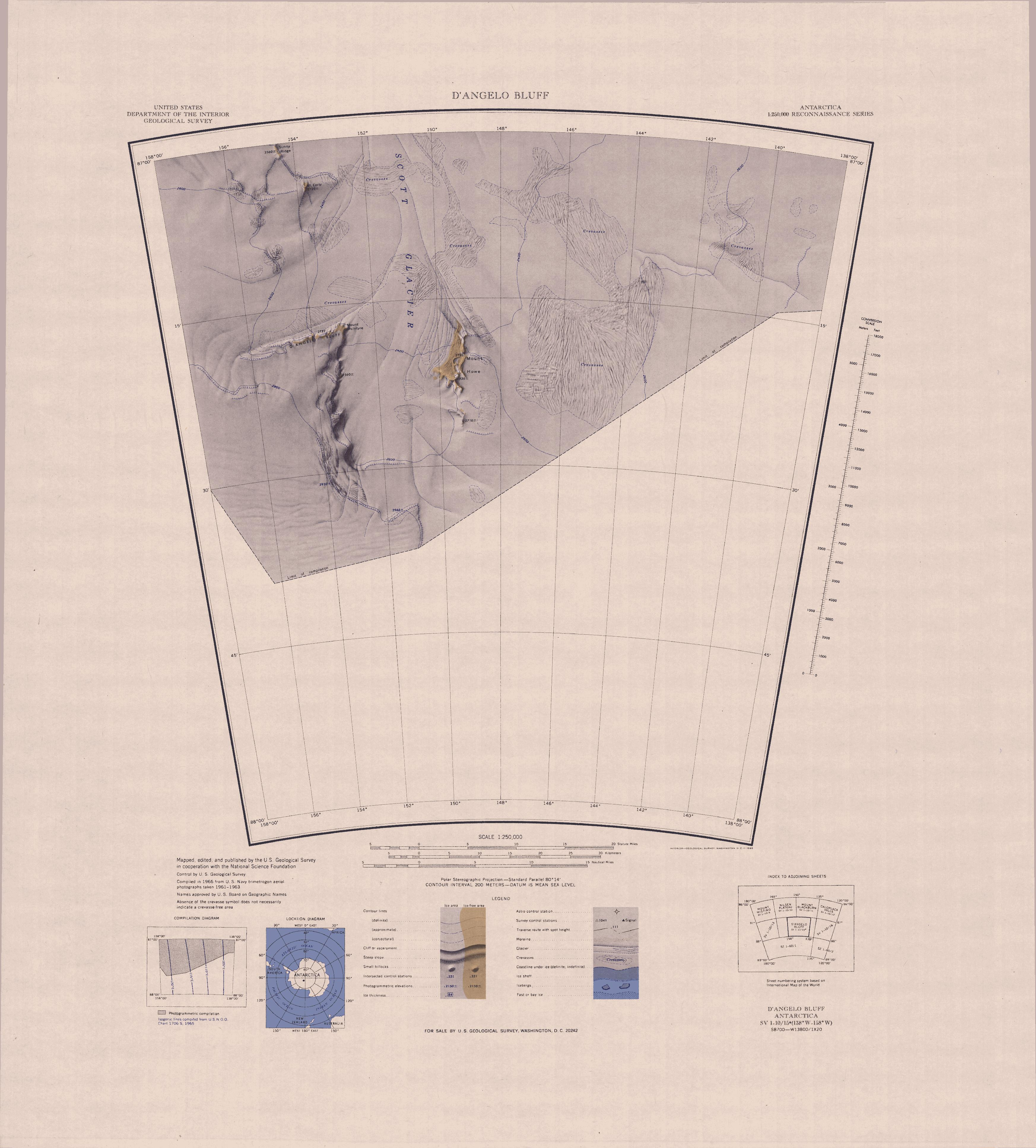
Head of Scott Glacier

The head of the Scott Glacier forms between the D'Angelo Bluff and Mount McIntyre to the west and Mount Howe to the east. The glacier flows north past Mount Early and Sunny Ridge to the west.

=== D'Angelo Bluff ===
87°18′S 154°00′W. A prominent north-facing rock bluff, 6 nautical miles (11 km; 6.9 mi) long, trending westward from Mount Mclntyre. The bluff stands at the west side of Scott Glacier, near the head, 13 nautical miles (24 km; 15 mi) south of Mount Early. Discovered by the Byrd Antarctic Expedition geological party led by Quin Blackburn, in December 1934. The bluff was visited December 5, 1962 by a geological party of the Ohio State University Institute of Polar Studies, led by George Doumani. Named by Doumani for CWO John D'Angelo, USA, helicopter pilot who landed the party on this bluff.

=== Mount McIntyre ===
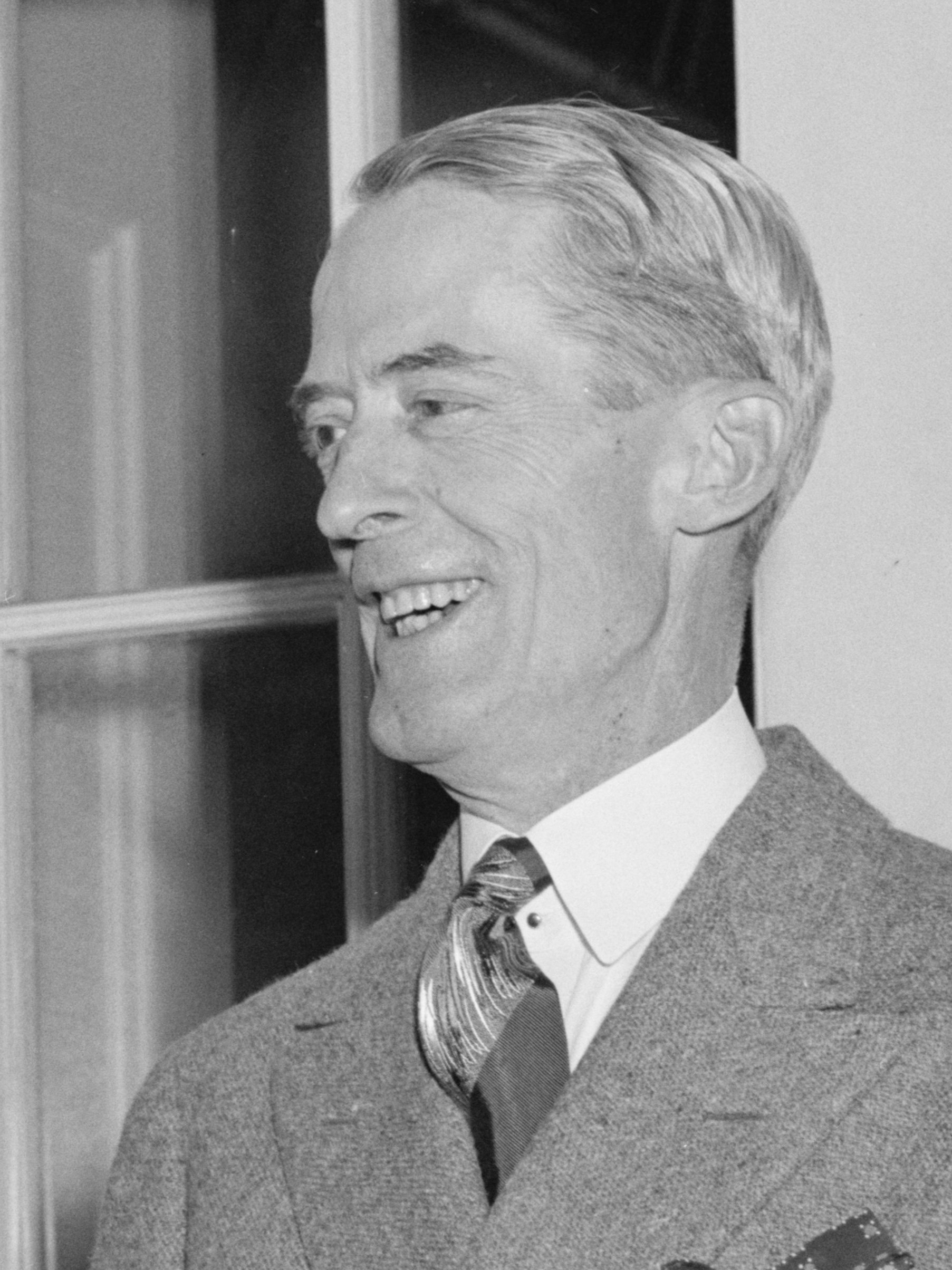
Marvin H. McIntyre

87°17′S 153°00′W. A rocky, flat, projecting-type mountain that forms the northeast extremity of D'Angelo Bluff. It rises at the west side of Scott Glacier, near the head, directly opposite Mount Howe. Discovered in December 1934 by the Byrd Antarctic Expedition geological party led by Quin Blackburn. Named by Admiral Byrd for Marvin H. McIntyre, secretary to the President of the United States at that time, Franklin D. Roosevelt.

=== Mount Howe ===
87°22′S 149°30′W. An elongated mountain, 2,930 metres (9,610 ft) high, comprising low connecting ridges and gable-shaped nunataks. It rises at the east side of Scott Glacier, near the head, directly opposite Mount Mclntyre. This mountain, including its small southern outlier, apparently is the southernmost mountain in the world. Discovered in December 1934 by the Byrd Antarctic Expedition geological party led by Quin Blackburn. Named by Admiral Byrd for Louis McHenry Howe, secretary to the President of the United States at that time, Franklin D. Roosevelt.

=== Mount Early ===
87°04′S 153°46′W. A solitary volcanic cone, 2,720 metres (8,920 ft) high, standing 13 nautical miles (24 km; 15 mi) north of D'Angelo Bluff, on the west side and near the head of Scott Glacier. Discovered in December 1934 from nearby Mount Weaver by the Byrd Antarctic Expedition geological party led by Quin Blackburn. Visited by the Ohio State University geological party led by George Doumani on November 21, 1962. Named by US-ACAN after Capt. Neal E. Early, USA, a member of the aviation unit that supported the USGS Topo East survey of this area, 1962-63.

=== Sunny Ridge ===
87°00′S 154°26′W. A partly snow-free ridge that trends southward for 1 nautical mile (1.9 km; 1.2 mi) from the western extremity of Mount Weaver. It stands at the west side of and near the head of Scott Glacier. The ridge was scaled by the Ohio State University geological party in November 1962. So named by party leader George Doumani because of very sunny conditions during the climb.

=== Mohn Basin ===
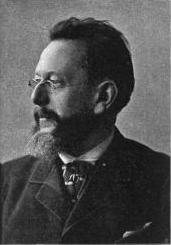
Henrik Mohn

86°30′S 168°00′W A major depression in the surface near the edge of the polar plateau. It extends southward from the western limit of Quarles Range for about 100 nautical miles (190 km; 120 mi) and includes the névé area adjacent to the heads of the Bowman, Devils, Amundsen and Scott Glaciers, in the Queen Maud Mountains. The feature was encountered in December 1911 by the South Pole Party of the Norwegian expedition under Roald Amundsen. Named by the US-ACAN for Henrik Mohn, Norwegian meteorologist and author of the meteorological report of this expedition.

== Left tributaries ==
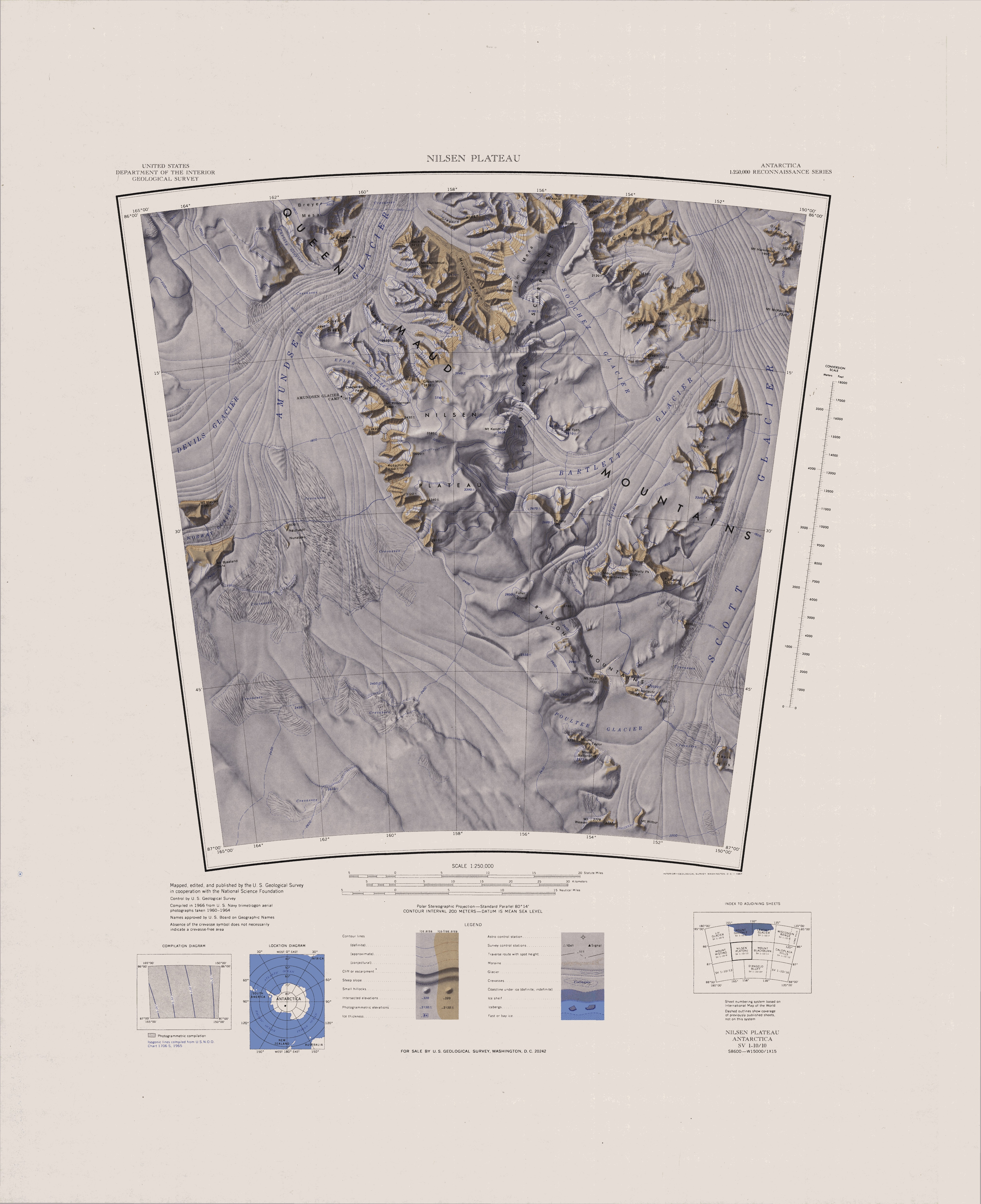
Upper Scott Glacier (east)

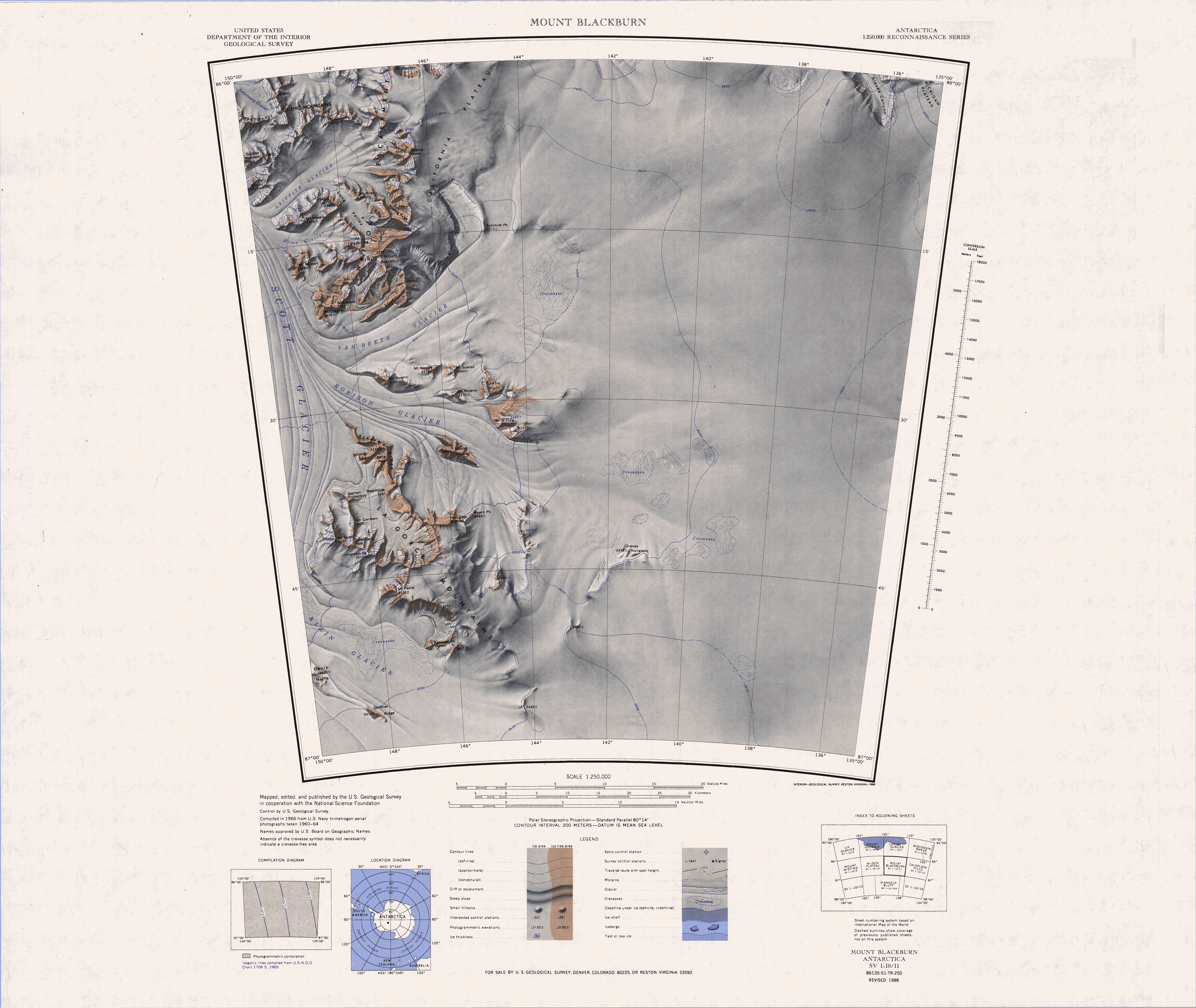
Upper Scott Glacier (west)

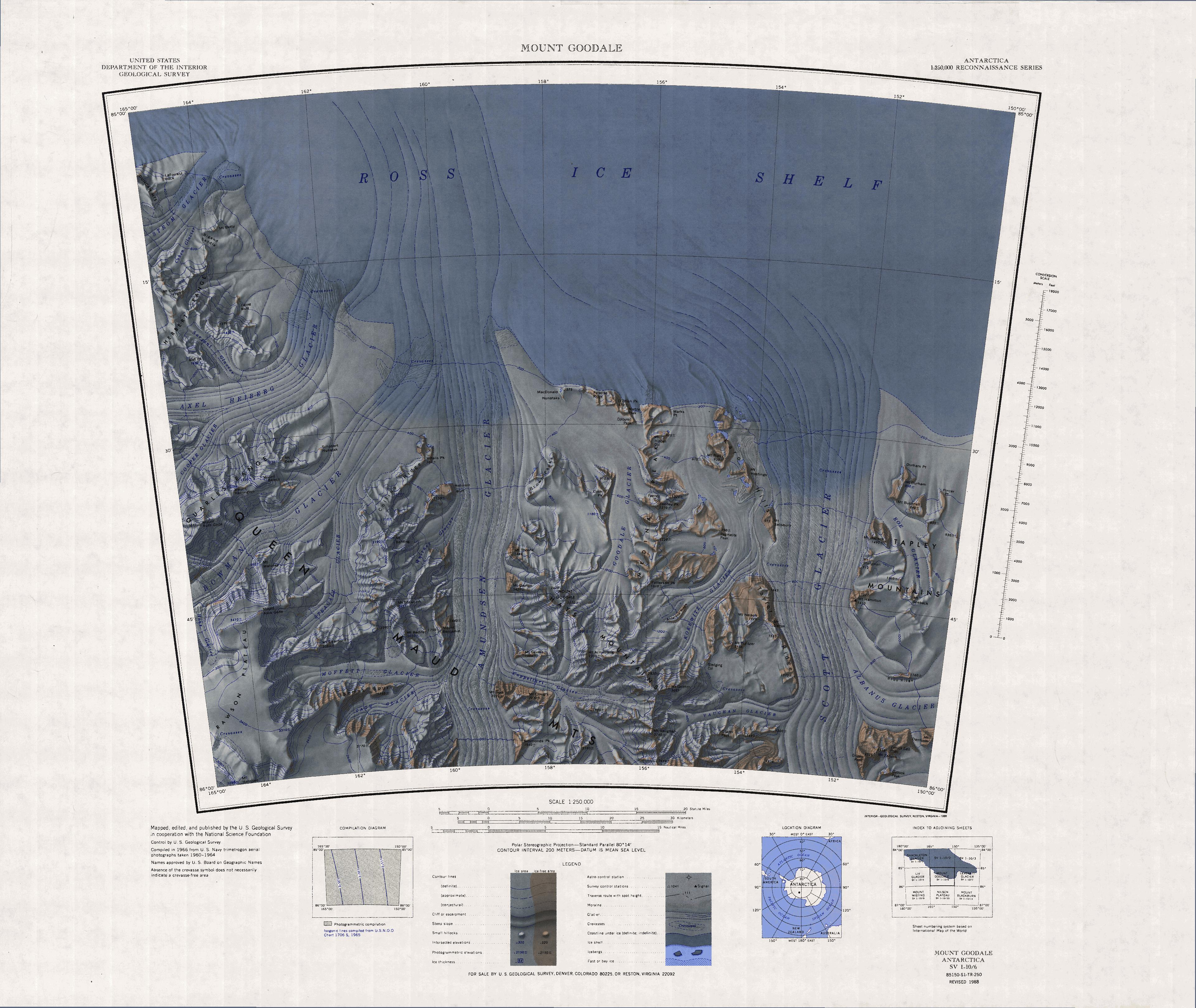
Lower Scott Glacier (east)

Tributaries from the left (west) include from south to north:

=== Poulter Glacier ===
86°50′S 153°30′W. A tributary glacier draining east along the south flank of the Rawson Mountains to enter Scott Glacier. Discovered by the geological party of the ByrdAE, 1933–35, and named by Byrd for Thomas C. Poulter, second in command of the expedition.

=== Bartlett Glacier ===
86°15′S 152°00′W. A tributary glacier, about 30 nautical miles (56 km; 35 mi) long and 5 nautical miles (9.3 km; 5.8 mi) wide at its terminus. It flows northeast from Nilsen Plateau and joins Scott Glacier close north of Mount Gardiner. Discovered in December 1934 by the ByrdAE geological party under Quin Blackburn, and named by Byrd for Capt. Robert A. Bartlett of Brigus, Newfoundland, noted Arctic navigator and explorer who recommended that the expedition acquire the Bear, an ice-ship which was purchased and rechristened by Byrd as the Bear of Oakland. Not: Bob Bartlett Glacier.

=== Holdsworth Glacier ===
86°30′S 154°00′W. A tributary glacier about 8 nautical miles (15 km; 9.2 mi) long, flowing northeast from Fuller Dome to enter the southeast side of Bartlett Glacier. Named by US-ACAN for Gerald Holdsworth, involved in geological studies at McMurdo Station, summer of 1965-66.

=== Souchez Glacier ===
86°17′S 154°00′W. A tributary glacier about 17 nautical miles (31 km; 20 mi) long, flowing from Mount Crockett south along the east side of Faulkner Escarpment and then turning southeast to parallel the southwest side of Hays Mountains. It joins Bartlett Glacier just south of Mount Dietz. Named by US-ACAN for Roland A. Souchez, involved in geological studies at McMurdo Station during the season of 1965-66.

=== Vaughan Glacier ===
85°55′S 153°12′W. A tributary glacier, 10 nautical miles (19 km; 12 mi) long, draining eastward from Mount Vaughan to enter Scott Glacier just south of Taylor Ridge, in the Hays Mountains. Mapped by USGS from surveys and USN air photos, 1960-64. Named by US-ACAN in association with Mount Vaughan.

=== Koerwitz Glacier ===
85°42′S 154°24′W. A low gradient glacier flowing northeast from Mount Griffith in the Hays Mountains to the Karo Hills. First seen and roughly mapped by the ByrdAE, 1928-30. Named by US-ACAN for Peter H. Koerwitz, biolab manager at McMurdo Station in 1965.

== Right tributaries ==
Tributaries from the right (east) are from south to north:

=== Klein Glacier ===
86°48′S 150°00′W. A broad glacier near the edge of the polar plateau, flowing northwest into Scott Glacier immediately south of La Gorce Mountains. Mapped by USGS from surveys and USN air photos, 1960-63. Named by US-ACAN for Lt. Cdr. Verle W. Klein, pilot with USN Squadron VX-6 on Operation Deep Freeze, 1966 and 1967.

=== Robison Glacier ===
86°29′S 148°12′W. A broad tributary glacier flowing northwest along the north side of La Gorce Mountains to enter Scott Glacier. Discovered in December 1934 by the ByrdAE geological party under Quin Blackburn. Named by US-ACAN for Lt. Cdr. Layton E. Robison, pilot with USN Squadron VX-6 during Operation Deep Freeze 1964, 1965 and 1966.

=== Van Reeth Glacier ===
86°25′S 148°00′W. A tributary glacier about 20 nautical miles (37 km; 23 mi) long, draining westward to Scott Glacier between Mount Blackburn and Mount Bowlin. Discovered in December 1934 by the ByrdAE geological party under Quin Blackburn. Named by US-ACAN for Cdr. Eugene W. Van Reeth, pilot with USN Squadron VX-6 in Antarctica during Operation Deep Freeze 1966, 1967 and 1968, and Squadron Commander in 1969.

=== Howe Glacier ===
86°14′S 149°12′W. A short tributary glacier draining west into Scott Glacier immediately north of Mount Russell, in the Queen Maud Mountains. Mapped by USGS from surveys and USN air photos, 1960-63. Named by US-ACAN for Robert C. Howe of USN Squadron VX-6, photographer on Operation Deep Freeze 1966 and 1967.

=== Griffith Glacier ===
86°11′S 149°24′W. A tributary glacier draining westward from the California Plateau and Watson Escarpment to enter Scott Glacier between Mount McKercher and Mount Meeks. Mapped by USGS from surveys and USN air photos, 1960-63. Named by US-ACAN for Lt. Cdr. Philip G. Griffith, aircraft commander on photographic flights during Operation Deep Freeze 1966 and 1967.

=== Sanctuary Glacier ===
86°00′S 150°25′W. A glacier almost completely encircled by the Gothic Mountains. It drains west between Outlook Peak and Organ Pipe Peaks into Scott Glacier. Mapped by USGS from surveys and USN aerial photographs, 1960-64. The descriptive name was proposed by Edmund Stump, leader of a USARP-Arizona State University geological party which established a base camp on the glacier in January 1981.

=== Albanus Glacier ===
85°52′S 151°00′W. A glacier, 25 nautical miles (46 km; 29 mi) long, flowing west along the south side of Tapley Mountains to enter Scott Glacier just north of Mount Zanuck. Discovered in December 1934 by the ByrdAE geological party under Quin Blackburn, and named by Byrd for Albanus Phillips, Jr., manufacturer of Cambridge, MD, a patron of the ByrdAE of 1928-30 and 1933-35. Not: Phillips Glacier.

=== Roe Glacier ===
85°36′S 151°26′W. A tributary glacier, 10 miles (16 km) long, flowing northwest through the Tapley Mountains to enter Scott Glacier just south of Mount Durham. Mapped by USGS from surveys and USN air photos, 1960-64. Named by US-ACAN for Derrell M. Roe, a member of summer parties at McMurdo Station in 1963-64 and 1964–65 and station engineer with the McMurdo winter party in 1966.

== Sources ==
- Alberts, Fred G., ed. (1995), Geographic Names of the Antarctic (PDF) (2 ed.), United States Board on Geographic Names This article incorporates public domain material from websites or documents of the United States Board on Geographic Names.
- D'Angelo Bluff, USGS: United States Geological Survey
- Katz, H. R.; Waterhouse, B. C. (1970), "Geological reconnaissance of the Scott Glacier area, south-eastern Queen Maud Range, Antarctica", New Zealand Journal of Geology and Geophysics, 13 (4), doi:10.1080/00288306.1970.10418218
- Mount Blackburn, USGS: United States Geological Survey
- Mount Goodale, USGS: United States Geological Survey
- Nilsen Plateau, USGS: United States Geological Survey
- Sailing Directions for Antarctica: Including the Off-Lying Islands South of Latitude 60 Degrees S. (2 ed.), United States. Hydrographic Office, 1960 This article incorporates public domain material from websites or documents of the United States Hydrographic Office.

This article incorporates public domain material from websites or documents of the United States Geological Survey.
