= Hanson Formation =

Geological formation in Ross Dependency, Antarctica

- Stratigraphic range: Sinemurian-Pliensbachian; ~194.6–188.5 Ma
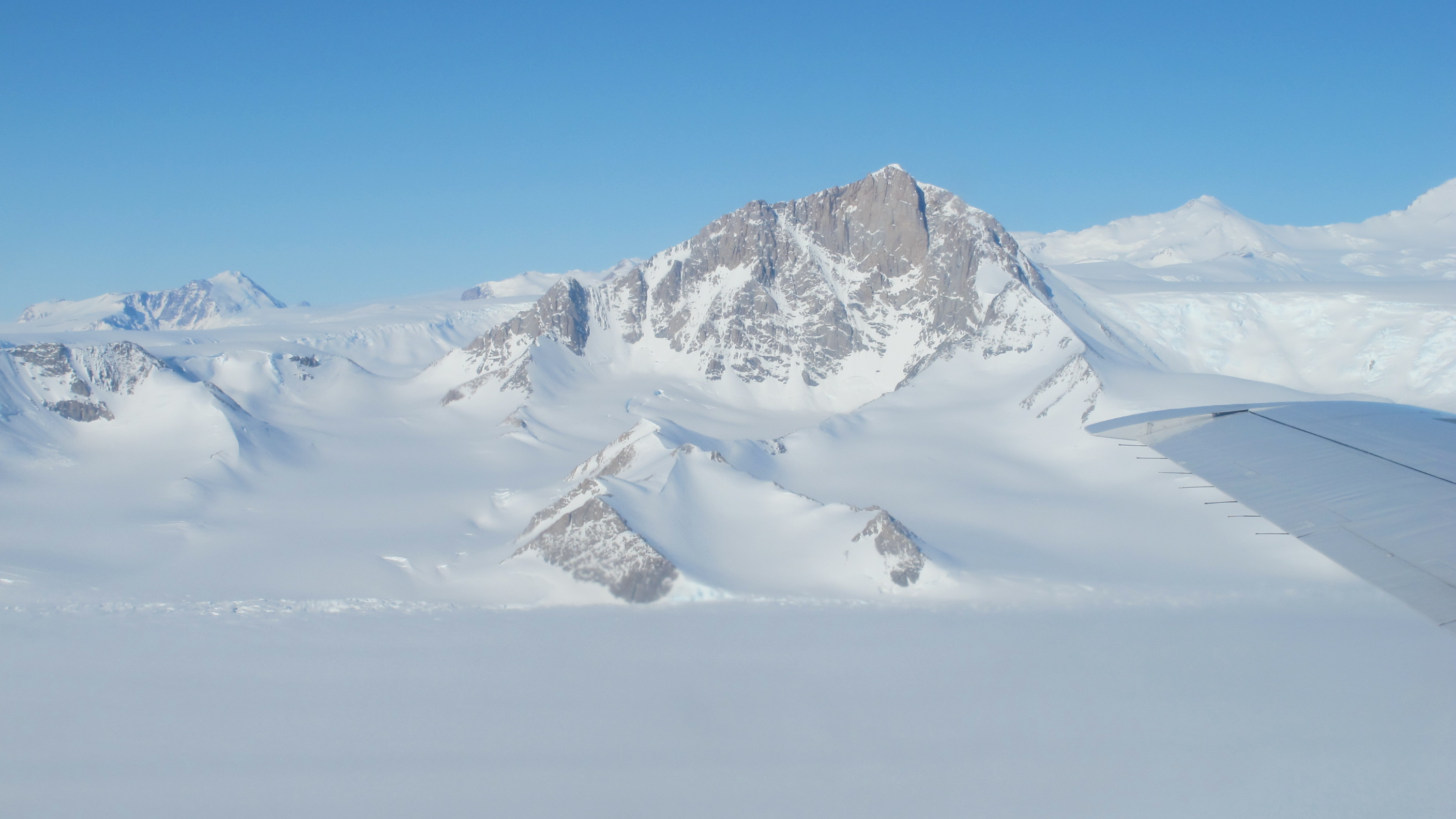
- Exposed strata near Beardmore Glacier
- Type: Geological formation
- Unit of: Victoria Group
- Sub-units: Three informal members
- Underlies: Prebble Formation
- Overlies: Falla Formation
- Thickness: 237.5 m (779 ft)

Lithology
- Primary: Sandstone, tuffite
- Other: Climbing-ripple lamination, horizontal lamination, and accumulations of clay-gall rip-up clasts

Location
- Coordinates: 84.3°S 166.5°E
- Approximate paleocoordinates: 57.5°S 35.5°E
- Region: Mount Kirkpatrick, Beardmore Glacier
- Country: Ross Dependency

Type section
- Named for: The Hanson Spur
- Named by: David Elliot
- Hanson Formation (Antarctica)

The Hanson Formation (also known as the Shafer Peak Formation) is a geologic formation on Mount Kirkpatrick and north Victoria Land, Ross Dependency, Antarctica. It is one of the two major dinosaur-bearing rock groups found on Antarctica to date; the other is the Snow Hill Island Formation and related formations from the Late Cretaceous of the Antarctic Peninsula. The formation has yielded some Mesozoic specimens, but most of it is as yet unexcavated. Part of the Victoria Group of the Transantarctic Mountains, it lies below the Prebble Formation and above the Falla Formation. The formation includes material from volcanic activity linked to the Karoo-Ferar eruptions of the Lower Jurassic. The climate of the zone was similar to that of modern southern Chile, humid, with a temperature interval of 17–18 degrees Celsius (62.6-64.4 degrees Fahrenheit). The Hanson Formation is correlated with the Section Peak Formation of the Eisenhower Range and Deep Freeze Range, as well as volcanic deposits on the Convoy Range and Ricker Hills of southern Victoria Land. Recent work has successfully correlated the Upper Section Peak Formation, as well unnamed deposits in Convoy Range and Ricker Hills with the Lower Hanson, all likely of Sinemurian age and connected by layers of silicic ash, while the upper section has been found to be Pliensbachian, and correlated with a greater volcanic pulse, marked by massive ash inputs.

== History ==
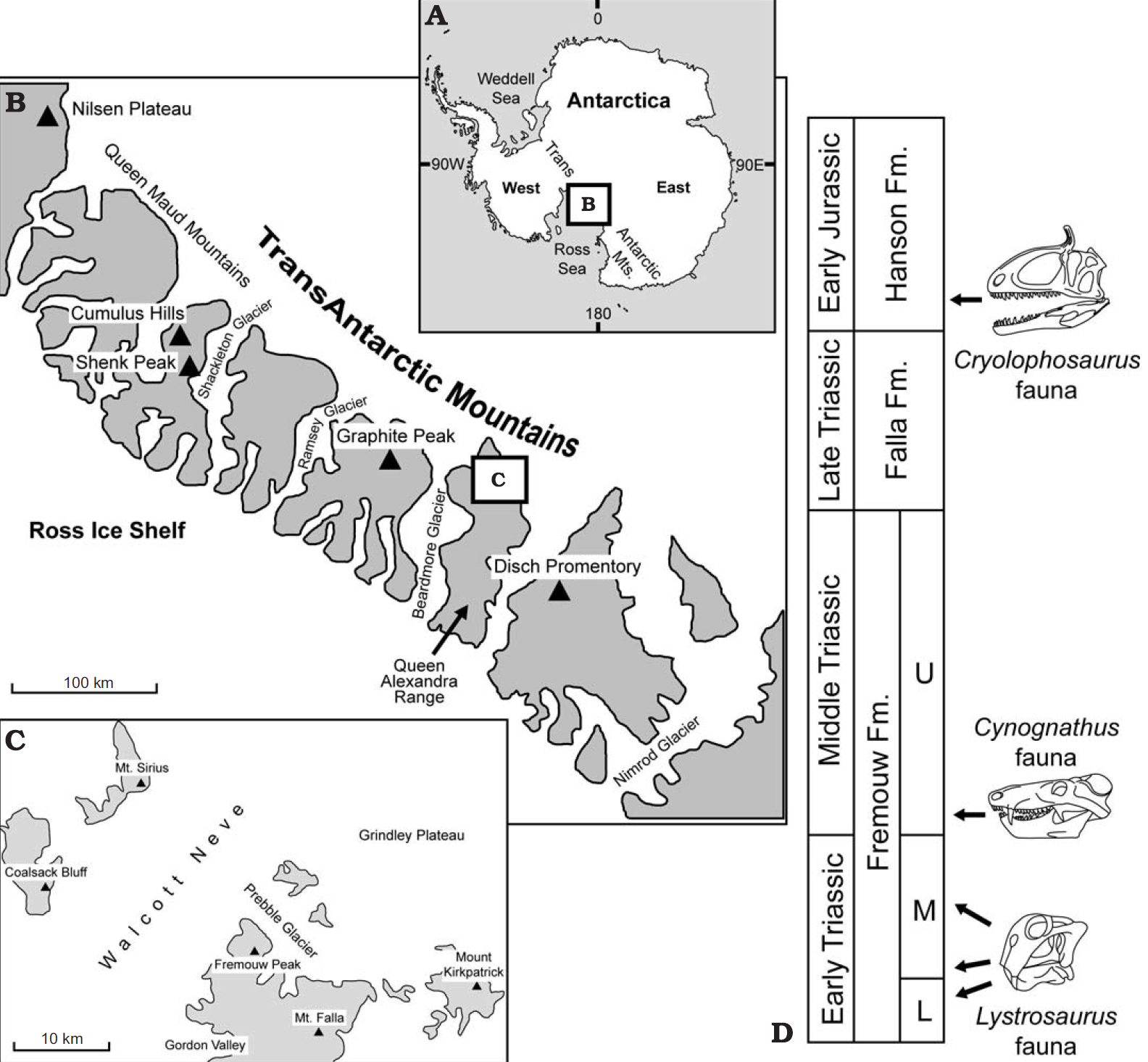
Map showing location of the Mount Kirkpatrick dinosaur site, with stratigraphic context of the Hanson Formation

The Victoria Group (also called Beacon Supergroup) from the Central Transantarctic Mountains was defined by Ferrar in 1907, when he described the "Beacon Sandstone" of the sedimentary rocks in the valleys of the Victoria Land. Following this initial work, the term "Beacon System" was introduced for a series of similar sandstones and associated deposits that were recovered locally. Later the "Beacon Sandstone Group" was assigned to those units in Victoria Land, with Harrington in 1965 proposing the name for different units that appear in the Beacon rocks of south Victoria Land, the beds below the Maya erosion surface, the Taylor Group and the Gondwana sequence, including the Victoria Group. This work left out several older units, such as the Permian coal measures and glacial deposits. It was not until 1963 that there was an establishment of the Gondwana sequence: the term Falla Formation was chosen to delimit a 2300 ft (700 m) series of lower quartz sandstone, a middle mica-carbon sandstone and an upper sandstone-shale unit. The formation lying above the Falla Formation and below the Prebble Formation was then termed the Upper Falla Formation, with considerable uncertainty about its age (it was calculated from the presence of Glossopteris-bearing beds (Early Permian) and the assumed possibility that the rocks were older than Dicroidium-bearing beds, thought to be Late Triassic, in the Dominion Range). Later works tried to set it between the Late Triassic (Carnian) and the Lower-Middle Jurassic (Toarcian–Aalenian). The local Jurassic sandstones were included in the Victoria Group, with the Beacon unit defined as a supergroup in 1972, comprising beds overlying the pre-Devonian Kukri erosion surface to the Prebble Formation in the central Transantarctic Mountains and the Mawson Formation (and its unit, then separated, the Carapace Sandstone) in southern Victoria Land. The Mawson Formation, identified at the beginning as indeterminate tillite, was later placed in the Ferrar Group.

Extensive fieldwork later demonstrated the need for revisions to the post-Permian stratigraphy. It was found that only 282 m of the upper 500 m of the Falla Formation as delimited in 1963 correspond to the sandstone/shale sequence, with the other 200 m comprising a volcaniclastic sequence. New units were then described from this location: the Fremouw Formation and Prebble Formation, the latter term being introduced for a laharic unit, not seen in 1963, that occurs between the Falla Formation and the Kirkpatrick Basalt. A complete record was recovered at Mount Falla, revealing the sequence of events in the Transantarctic Mountains spanning the interval between the Upper Triassic Dicroidium-bearing beds and the Middle Jurassic tholeiitic lavas. The upper part of the Falla Formation contains recognizable primary pyroclastic deposits, exemplified by resistant, laterally continuous silicic tuff beds, that led this to be considered a different formation, especially as it shows erosion associated with tectonic activity that preceded or accompanied the silicic volcanism and marked the onset of the development of a volcano-tectonic rift system.

The Shafer Peak Formation was named from genetically identical deposits from north Victoria Land (exposed on Mt. Carson) in 2007 and correlated with the Hanson Formation, defined as tuffaceous deposits with silicic glass shards along with quartz and feldspar. Later works, however, have equated it to a continuation of the Hanson Formation, as part of the upper member.

The name "Hanson Formation" was proposed for the volcaniclastic sequence that was described in Barrett's 1969 Falla Formation essay. The name was taken from the Hanson Spur, which lies immediately to the west of Mount Falla and is developed on the resistant tuff unit described below.

== Paleogeography ==
At the point of deposition of the main Hanson and Shafer Peak outcrops and overall inner lands in the Latest Triassic-Lower Jurassic, the back then "Transantarctic Basin" was surrounded by contrasting continental hinterlands and active volcanic regions all along the Gondwanan margin, in a connected sequence including Australia, Zealandia and parts of West Antarctica. Towards the continental interior it was bordered by the East Antarctic craton, while the former "Ross High" (in the modern Ross Sea) that acted as a major topographic barrier, while still elevated, had been progressively reduced due to active erosion. In the Gondwanan continental margin, remnants of the Early Palaeozoic Ross orogen (seen today in isolated patches across Victoria Land as the Wilson, Bowers and Robertson Bay terranes) was a source for crystalline and metamorphic sediments. Towards the Panthalassan margin a series of major extensive volcanic highlands associated with the Gondwanide magmatic arc occupied crustal blocks, now preserved in New Zealand, Challenger Plateau and West Antarctica, this last mostly in Marie Byrd Land and Thurston Island. This volcanic belt was mostly centered around Zealandia´s "Median Batholith" and associated volcanic compexes, that alltogether supplied felsic and intermediate volcanic detritus to the basin. This region wasn´t the only source, as additional quartz-rich and garnet-bearing sediments probably originated from high-grade metamorphic terrains, potentially situated in what today is the Campbell Plateau. All this sources feeded the basin with widespread silicic ash, accumulated across continental floodplains and lakes. Early shallow intrusions of the Karoo-Ferrar also happened, latter transforming the river-dominated continental landscape into a volcanically influenced region, as seen in younger units such as the Mawson Formation.

== Paleoenvironment ==
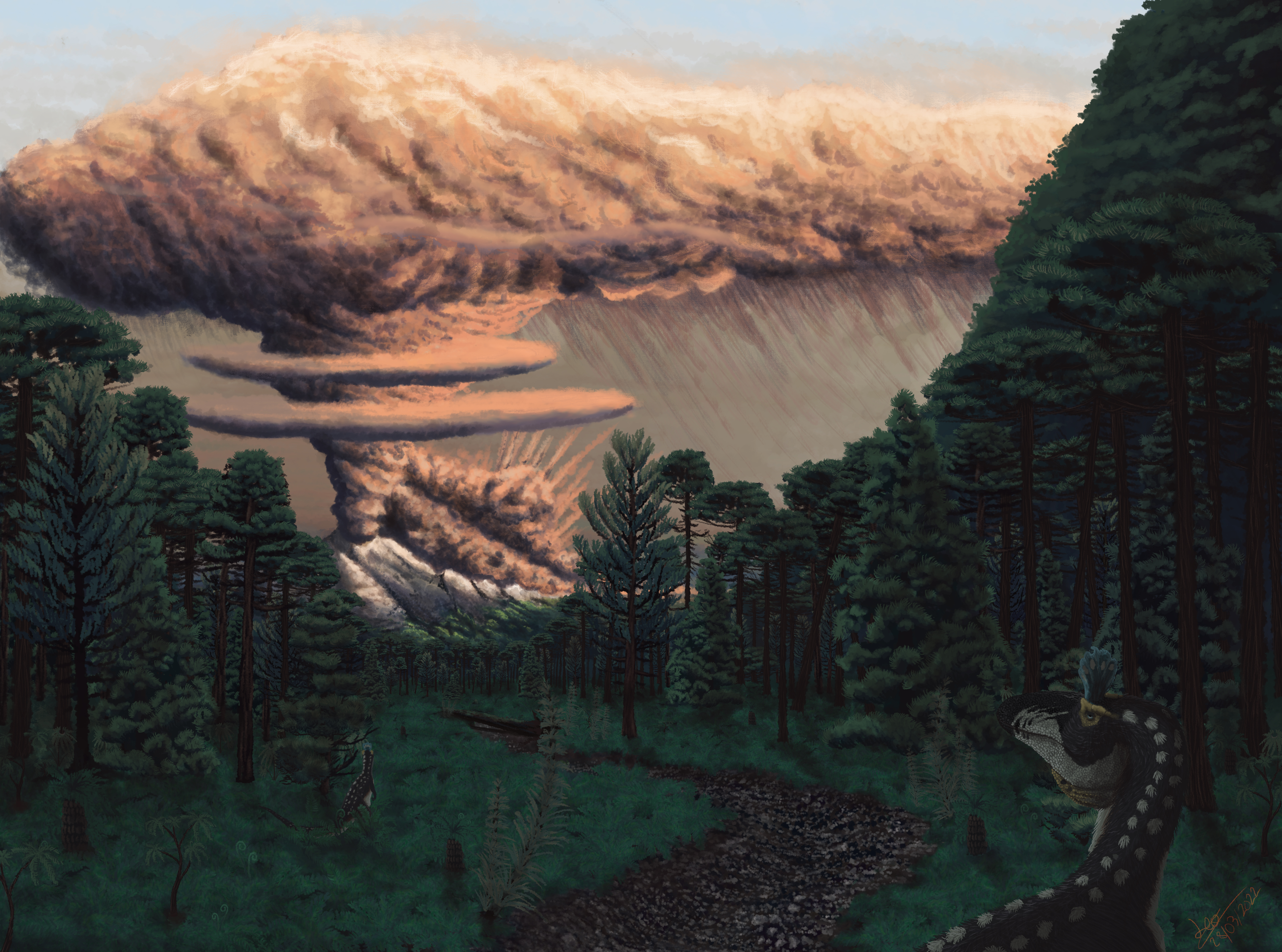
Environment reconstruction with a Plinian eruption in the background

The Hanson Formation accumulated in a rift environment located between c. 60 and 70S, fringing the East Antarctic Craton behind the active Panthalassan margin of southern Gondwana, being dominated by two types of facies: coarse- to medium-grained sandstone and tuffaceous rocks & minerals on the fluvial strata, which suggest the deposits where influenced by a large period of silicic volcanism, maybe more than 10 million years based on the thickness. When looking at the composition of this tuffs, fine grain sizes, along others aspects such as bubble-wall and tricuspate shard form or crystal-poor nature trends to suggest this volcanic events developed as distal Plinian Eruptions (extremely explosive eruptions), with some concrete layers with mineral grains of bigger size showing that some sectors where more proximal to volcanic sources. The distribution of some tuffs with accretionary lapilli, found scattered geographically and stratigraphically suggest transport by ephemeral river streams, as seen in the Oruanui Formation of New Zealand. The sandstones where likely derived of low-sinuosity sandybraided stream deposits, having interbeds with multistory cross-bedded sandstone bodies, indicators of either side channels or crude splay deposits and concrete well-stratified sections representing overbank deposits and/or ash recycled by ephemeral streams or aeolian processes. Towards the upper layers of the formation the influence of the Tuff in the sandstones get more notorious, evidenced by bigger proportions of volcanic minerals and ash-related materials embedded in between this layers. Overall, the unit deposition bear similarities to the several-hundredmetres-thick High Plains Cenozoic sequence of eastern Wyoming, Nebraska and South Dakota, with the fine-grained ash derived from distal volcanoes.

The Shafer Peak section flora is the typical reported in warm climates. Compared with the underlying Triassic layers, warm and overall humid, possibly more strongly seasonal, specially notorious by the abundance of Cheirolepidiaceae pollen, a key thermophilic element. Yet the dominance of this pollen doesn't indicate proper dry conditions, as for example mudcrack and other indicators of strong dry seasons are mostly absent, while common presence of the invertebrate ichnogenus Planolites indicates the local fluvial, alluvial or lacustrine waters where likely continuous all year, as well the presence of abundant Otozamites trends to suggest high humidity. Overall points to frost-free setting with strong seasonality in day-length given the high latitude, perhaps similar to warm-temperate, frost-free forest and open woodland as in North Island of New Zealand. Despite the proper conditions, peat accumulation was rare, mostly due to the influence of local volcanism, with common wildfire activity as show charred coalified plant remains. At Mount Carson associations of sphenophyte rhizomes and aerial stems, as well isoetalean leaves suggest the presence of overbank deposits that were developed in ephemeral pools that lasted enough to be colonized by semiaquatic plants.

Tectonically, based on the changes seen in the sandstone composition and the appearance of volcanic strata indicates the end of the so-called foreland depositional section in the Transantarctic Mountains, while appearance of arkoses with angular detritus and common Garnet points to local Palaeozoic basement uplift. The Rift Valley deposition is recovered in several coeval and underlying points, with its thickness as indicator of palaeotopographical confinement of palaeoflows coming generally to the NW quadrant, creating a setting that received both sediment derived from the surrounding rift shoulders and ash from distal eruptions. The Main fault indicator of this rift has been allocated around the Marsh Glacier, with the so-called Marsh Fault that breaks apart Precambrian rocks and the Miller Range, with other faults including a W-facing monocline that lies parallel and east of the Marsh Fault, a NW–SE-striking small graben in the southern Marshall Mountains, the fault at the Moore Mountains, the undescribed monocline facing east in the Dominion Range and an uplifted isolated fault in the west of Coalsack Bluff. Marsh Fault was likely active during the early Jurassic, leading to a development of an extensive rift valley system several thousand kilometres long along which basaltic magmatism was focused later towards the Pliensbachian, when the Hanson Formation deposited, somehow similar to East African Rift Valleys and specially Waimangu Volcanic Rift Valley, with segmentation in the rift and possible latter reverse faulting.

== Biota ==
=== Fungus ===
Color key: Taxon / Reclassified taxon / Taxon falsely reported as present / Dubious taxon or junior synonym / Ichnotaxon / Ootaxon / Morphotaxon

Notes
Uncertain or tentative taxa are in small text
~~crossed out~~ taxa are discredited.

Genus	Species	Location	Material	Notes	Images
Fungi indet.	Indeterminate	Mount Carson	Fungal remains in microbial mats	Fungal remains linked to matrix microbial maths	An equivalent modern mat from Wyoming
Aff. Verticicladiella/Ceratocystis	Aff. V./C. spp.	Suture Bench	Tylosis formation and fungi in axes	Tylosis-inducing fungi.	Modern Verticicladiella

=== Arthropods ===
At southwest Gair Mesa the basal layers that represent a lake shore are characterised by the noteworthy preservation of some arthropod remains.

Taxon	Species	Location	Material	Notes	Images
Blattodea indet.	Indeterminate	SW Gair Mesa	Specimen		
Coleoptera indet.	Indeterminate (various)	Mount Carson; Shafer Peak	Elytron		
Conchostraca indet.	Indeterminate (various)	Agate Peak; Mount Carson; Shafer Peak; Suture Bench; SW Gair Mesa	Shells		
Diplichnites	D. isp.	Mount Carson; Shafer Peak	Trace fossils	Probably made by arachnids or myriapods.	Diplichnites
Lioestheria	L. disgregaris	Agate Peak; Gair Mesa	Shells	A clam shrimp of the family Lioestheriinae.	
Ostracoda indet.	Indeterminate (various)	Agate Peak; SW Gair Mesa	Shells		
Planolites	P. isp.	Mount Carson; Shafer Peak; Suture Bench	Burrows	Made by freshwater arthropods(?) and document high water and himidity locally.	Planolites
Scoyenia	S. isp.	Mount Carson; Shafer Peak; Suture Bench	Burrows	In terrestrial settings usually referred to beetle and cranefly larvae.	

=== Fishes ===
Taxon	Species	Location	Material	Notes	Images
Actinopterygii indet.	Indeterminate	Agate Peak	Isolated scales	Maybe related or the same as Oreochima.	

=== Synapsids ===
Taxon	Species	Location	Material	Notes	Images
Tritylodontidae indet.	Indeterminate	Mt. Kirkpatrick	An isolated upper postcanine tooth, FMNH PR1824	Beaver-sized and believed to be related to the Asian genus Bienotheroides.	Tritylodon

=== Pterosaurs ===
Taxon	Species	Location	Material	Notes	Images
Dimorphodontidae? indet.	Indeterminate	Mt. Kirkpatrick	Humerus	Nearly the same size as YPM Dimorphodon. Its morphotype is common for basal pterosaurs, such as those in Preondactylus or Arcticodactylus.	Dimorphodon

=== Dinosaurs ===
Taxon	Species	Location	Material	Notes	Images
Cryolophosaurus	C. ellioti	Mt. Kirkpatrick	FMNH PR1821: nearly complete skull and associated partial skeleton; Remains of a second specimen collected in 2010; Juvenile teeth	Incertae sedis within Neotheropoda, probably related to the Averostra. It is the best characterized dinosaur found in the formation, and was probably the largest predator on the ecosystem.	Skeleton of Cryolophosaurus
Glacialisaurus	G. hammeri	Mt. Kirkpatrick	FMNH PR1823, a partial right astragalus, medial and lateraldistal tarsals, and partial right metatarsus preserved in articulation with each other. A Distal left femur, FMNH PR1822, was referred	A Sauropodomorph, member of the family Massospondylidae. Related to Lufengosaurus of China. Was recently compared with Lamplughsaura.	Glacialisaurus holotype
Massopoda indet.	Indeterminate	Mt. Kirkpatrick	Several vertebrae and Pelvic material	Was first exhibited at the Natural History Museum of Los Angeles County, where it was compared to Leonerasaurus.	Material of the unnamed Massopodan
Massospondylidae indet.	Gen et sp. nov.	Mt. Kirkpatrick	FMNH PR 3051, nearly complete juvenile skeleton including partial skull	Represents the only current Sauropodomorph with cranial material from the continent. Was originally compared to Leonerasaurus, yet latter was found to be related with Ignavusaurus and Sarahsaurus.	Skull of the unnamed Sauropodomorph
Ornithischia? indet.	Indeterminate	Mt. Kirkpatrick	Dorsal vertebrae, femur and possible caudal vertebrae	Not mentioned in any peer-reviewed study yet. Informally described as a "four or five-foot ornithischian or bird-hipped dinosaur", possibly "related to the fabrosaur or heterodontosaur."	Eocursor, close in paleogeographical range
Sauropoda indet.	Indeterminate	Mt. Kirkpatrick	3 m (9.8 ft) wide pelvis and ilium, isolated vertebrae and limb elements	Collected during the 2003-2004 field season; first informally announced in 2004 news articles, and first formally mentioned by Smith et al. (2007) and Hammer & Smith (2008). The presence of Glacialisaurus in the Hanson Formation with advanced true sauropods shows that both basal and derived members of this lineage existed side by side in the Early Jurassic.	Ledumahadi close in paleogeographical range
Theropoda indet.	Indeterminate	Mt. Kirkpatrick	Maxilla fragment with 3 teeth; 6 isolated teeth	Described as two types of indeterminate "scavenging theropod".	

=== Flora ===
Likely that (at least parts of) the palynomorph contents of these samples may derive from accessory clasts of underlying host strata that were incorporated and reworked during hydrovolcanic activity. Fossilized wood is also present in the Hanson Formation, near the stratigraphic level of the tritylodont locality. It has affinities with the Araucariaceae and similar kinds of conifers. In the north Victoria Land region, plant remains occur at the base of the lacustrine beds directly underlying the initial pillow lavas at the top of the sedimentary profile. Some of the layers of Shafer Peak include remains of an in situ stand gymnosperm trees:

- At Mount Carson, at least four large tree trunks were found on an exposed bedding plane. The wood is coalified and only partially silicified, with the largest stem reaching a diameter of nearly 50 cm.
- In Suture Bench, silicified tree trunks are found buried in situ along lava flows. Some specimens have several holes or tunnels less than 1 cm wide that may represent arthropod borings.

Genus	Species	Location	Material	Notes	Images
Alisporites	A. grandis; A. lowoodensis; A. similis	Shafer Peak	Pollen	Affinities with Corystospermaceae & Peltaspermaceae.	
Allocladus	A. sp.	Mount Carson	Cuticles	Affinities with Cheirolepidiaceae or Araucariaceae.	
Aratrisporites	A. sp.	Shafer Peak	Spores	Affinities with Pleuromeiales.	
Araucariacites	A. australis	Shafer Peak	Pollen	Affinities with the family Araucariaceae.	
Baculatisporites	B. comaumensis	Shafer Peak	Spores	Affinities with the family Osmundaceae.	
Calamospora	C. tener	Shafer Peak	Spores	Affinities with the Calamitaceae.	
Cladophlebis	C. oblonga	Carapace Nunantak (reworked); Shafer Peak	Leaves and stems	Affinities with the family Osmundaceae.	Cladophlebis
Classopollis	C. cf. chateaunovi; C. meyerianus	McLea Nunatak, Prince Albert Mountains	Pollen	Affinities with the family Cheirolepidiaceae. Assemblages strongly dominated (82% and 85%, respectively, for the two species) by Classopollis grains.	
Clathropteris	C. meniscoides	Shafer Peak; Mount Carson	Leaf segments	Affinities with the family Dipteridaceae. Specimens from Shafer Peak occur in a tuffitic mass-flow deposit and are associated with abundant charred wood indicating wildfires.	Clathropteris meniscoides
Coniopteris	C. murrayana; C. hymenophylloides	Mount Carson	Pinna fragments	Affinities with Polypodiales.	
Corollina	C. torosa; C. simplex	Shafer Peak	Pollen	Affinities with the family Cheirolepidiaceae.	
Cyathidites	C. australis	Shafer Peak	Spores	Affinities with the family Cyatheaceae or Adiantaceae.	
Cybotiumspora	C. junta; C. jurienensis	Shafer Peak	Spores	Affinities with the family Cibotiaceae.	
Cycadolepis	C. spp.	Mount Carson	Fragment of a scale leaf	Affinities with Bennettitales.	
Dejerseysporites	D. verrucosus	Shafer Peak	Spores	Affinities with the Sphagnaceae.	
Densoisporites	D. psilatus	Shafer Peak	Spores	Affinities with the Selaginellaceae.	
Dicroidium	D. sp.	Shafer Peak	One cuticle fragment on slide	Affinities with the family Corystospermaceae. The youngest record of the genus.	Dicroidium
Dictyophyllitides	D. bassis	Shafer Peak	Spores	Affinities with the family Schizaeaceae, Dicksoniaceae or Matoniaceae.	
Equisetites	E. spp.	Mount Carson	Fragments of rhizomes, unbranched aerial shoots, isolated leaf sheaths and nodal diaphragms	Affinities with Equisetaceae.	
Elatocladus	E. sp.	Mount Carson	Cuticles	Affinities with Cupressaceae.	
Isoetites	I. abundans	Mount Carson	Stems	Affinities with the family Isoetaceae.	
Marchantites	M. mawsonii	Carapace Nunantak (reworked)	Thalli	Affinities with the family Marchantiales.	Marchantia
Matonidium	cf. M. goeppertii	Mount Carson	Pinna portions	Affinities with the family Matoniaceae.	
Neoraistrickia	N. tavlorii; N. truncaia; N. suratensis	Shafer Peak	Spores	Affinities with the Selaginellaceae.	
Nevesisporites	N. vallatus	McLea Nunatak, Prince Albert Mountains; Shafer Peak	Spores	Affinities with Bryophyta.	
Nothodacrium	N. warrenii	Carapace Nunantak (reworked)	Branched shoots	Affinities with Voltziales. Previously suggested to be a Podocarpaceae, yet a more recent work found it to be just a convergently evolved relative of Telemachus.	
Otozamites	O. linearis; O. sanctae-crucis	SW Gair Mesa; Mount Carson; Shafer Peak	Pinnately compound leaves	Affinities with Bennettitales.	
Pagiophyllum	P. spp.	Carapace Nunantak (reworked); Mount Carson	Leaves; Cuticles	Affinities with the family Araucariaceae.	
Perinopollenites	P. elatoides	Shafer Peak	Pollen	Affinities with the family Cupressaceae.	
Platysaccus	P. queenslandii	Shafer Peak	Pollen	Affinities with the families Caytoniaceae, Corystospermaceae, Podocarpaceae and Voltziaceae.	
Podosporites	P. variabilis	McLea Nunatak, Prince Albert Mountains; Shafer Peak	Pollen	Affinities with the family Podocarpaceae.	
Polycingulatisporites	P. mooniensis; P. triangularis	Shafer Peak	Spores	Affinities with the family Notothyladaceae.	
Polyphacelus	P. stormensis	Mount Carson	Leaf segments	Affinities with the family Dipteridaceae.	
Puntactosporites	P. walkomi; P. scabratus	Shafer Peak	Spores	Incertade Sedis pteridophyte.	
Retitriletes	R. semimuris; R. austroclavatidites; R. rosewoodensis; R. clavatoides	McLea Nunatak, Prince Albert Mountains	Spores	Affinities with the family Lycopodiaceae.	
Rogalskaisporites	R. cicatricosus	Shafer Peak	Spores	Incertade Sedis pteridophyte.	
Rugulatisporites	R. nelsonensis	Shafer Peak	Spores	Affinities with the family Osmundaceae.	
Schizolepidopsis	S. sp.	Mount Carson	Cone scales	Affinities with the family Pinaceae.	
Sculptisporis	S. moretonensis	Shafer Peak	Spores	Affinities with the Sphagnaceae.	
Spiropteris	S. sp.	Mount Carson	Coiled fern crozier	Incertade Sedis pteridophyte.	
Stereisporites	S. antiquasporites	Shafer Peak	Spores	Affinities with the Sphagnaceae.	
Trachysporites	T. fuscus	Shafer Peak	Spores	Incertade Sedis pteridophyte.	
Thymosphora	T. ipsviciensis	Shafer Peak	Spores	Incertade Sedis pteridophyte.	
Verrucosisporites	V. varians	Shafer Peak	Spores	Incertade Sedis pteridophyte.	
Vitreisporites	V. signatus	Shafer Peak	Pollen	Affinities with the family Caytoniaceae.	
Zamites	Z. sp.	Mount Carson	Fragment of a large, pinnately compound leaf	Affinities with Bennettitales.	

== See also ==
- List of dinosaur-bearing rock formations
- List of fossiliferous stratigraphic units in Antarctica
- Mawson Formation
- Lashly Formation
