= Beaver Glacier =

Beaver Glacier may refer to:

- Beaver Glacier (Enderby Land)
- Beaver Glacier (Ross Ice Shelf)
