= Transantarctic Mountains =

Mountain range in Antarctica

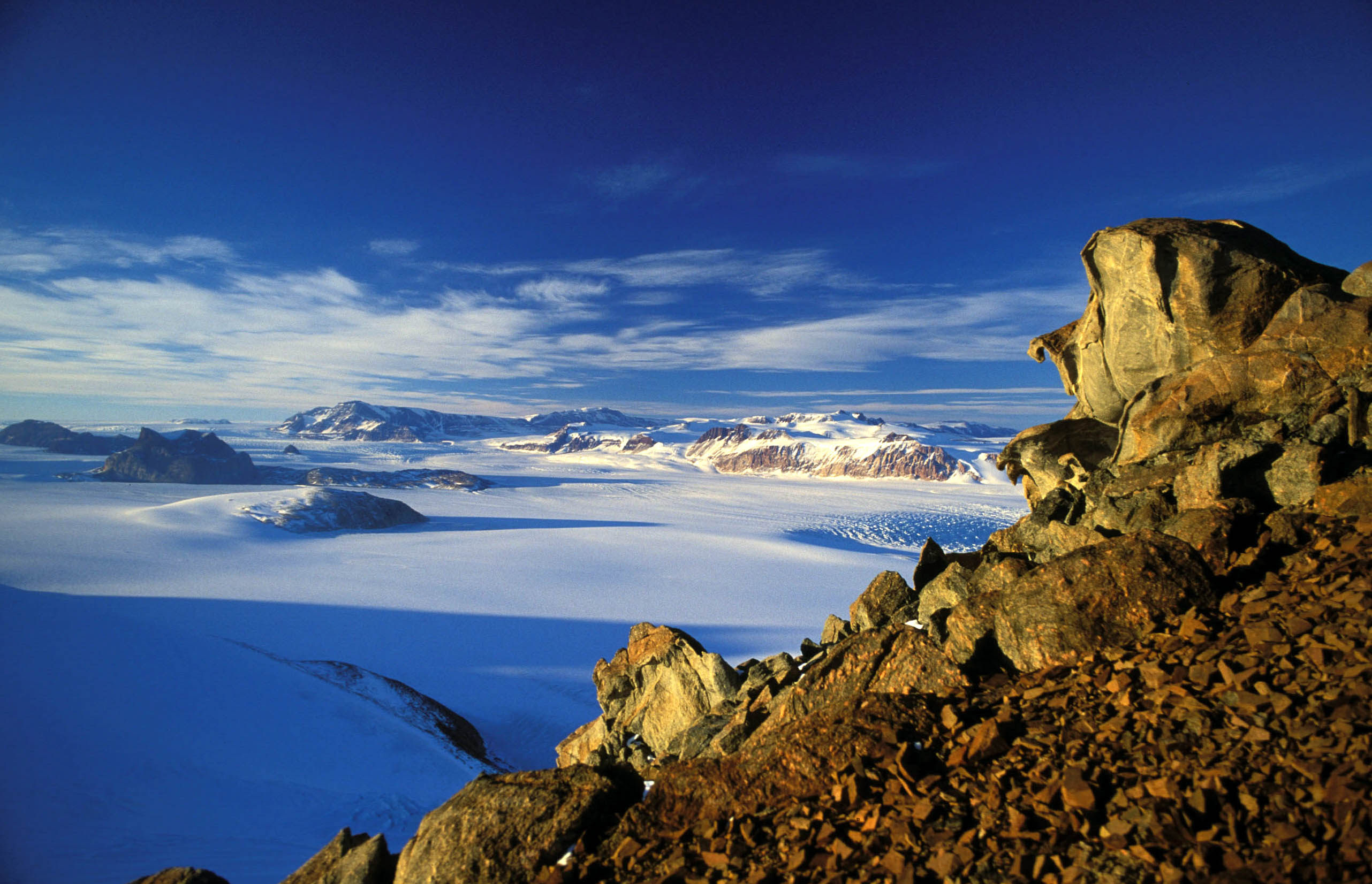
- The Transantarctic Mountains in northern Victoria Land near Cape Roberts

Highest point
- Peak: Mount Kirkpatrick
- Elevation: 4,528 m (14,856 ft)
- Coordinates: 84°20′S 166°25′E

Dimensions
- Length: 3,500 km (2,200 mi)

Geography
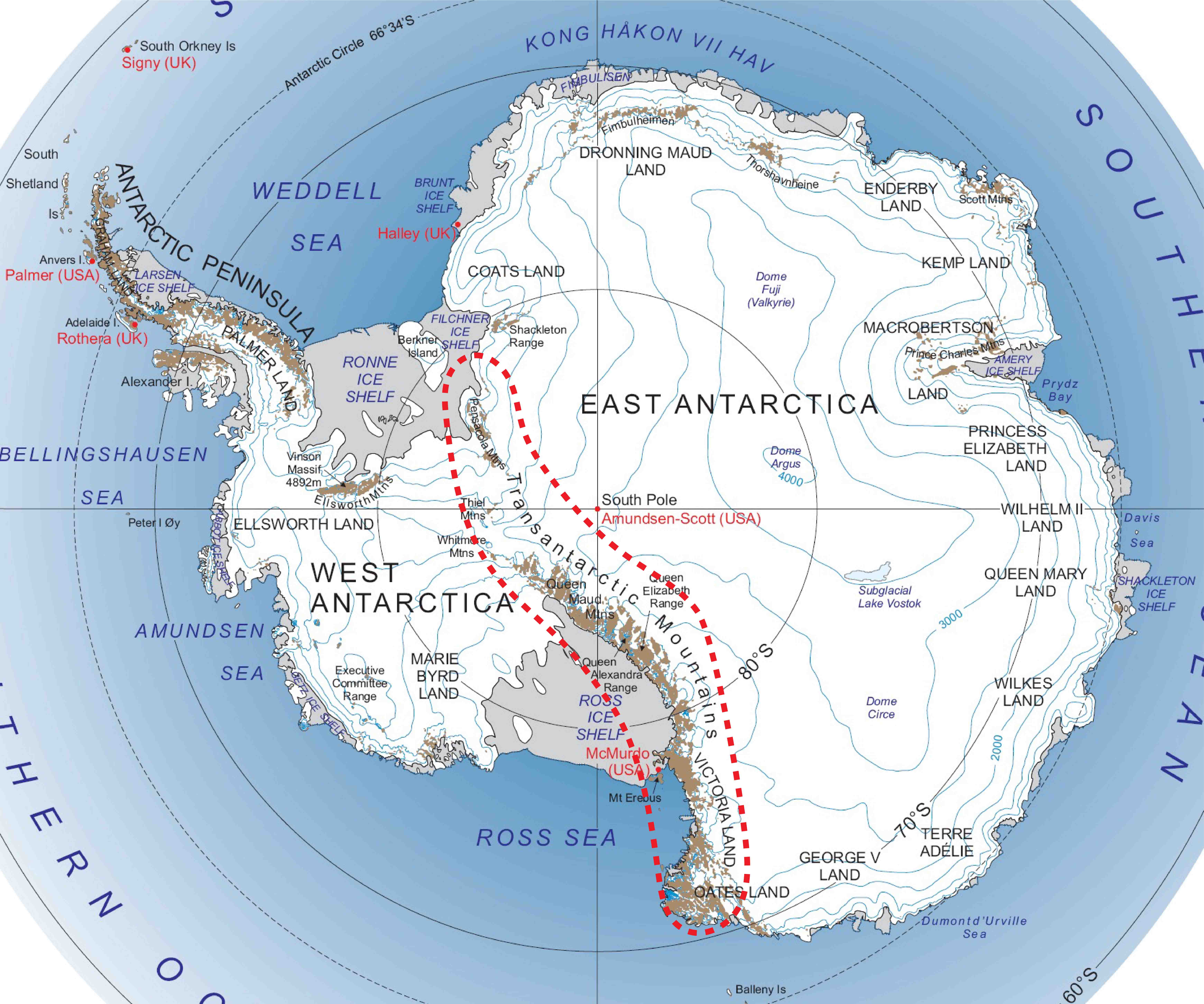
- Continent: Antarctica
- Range coordinates: 85°S 175°W

Geology
- Rock age: Cenozoic

The Transantarctic Mountains (abbreviated TAM) comprise a mountain range of uplifted rock (primarily sedimentary) in Antarctica which extends, with some interruptions, across the continent from Cape Adare in northern Victoria Land to Coats Land. These mountains divide East and West Antarctica. They include a number of separately named mountain groups, which are often again subdivided into smaller ranges.

The range was first sighted by the sailors of the British Ross expedition in 1841 at what was later named the Ross Ice Shelf after expedition commander James Clark Ross. It was first crossed during the British National Antarctic Expedition of 1901–1904.

== Geography ==
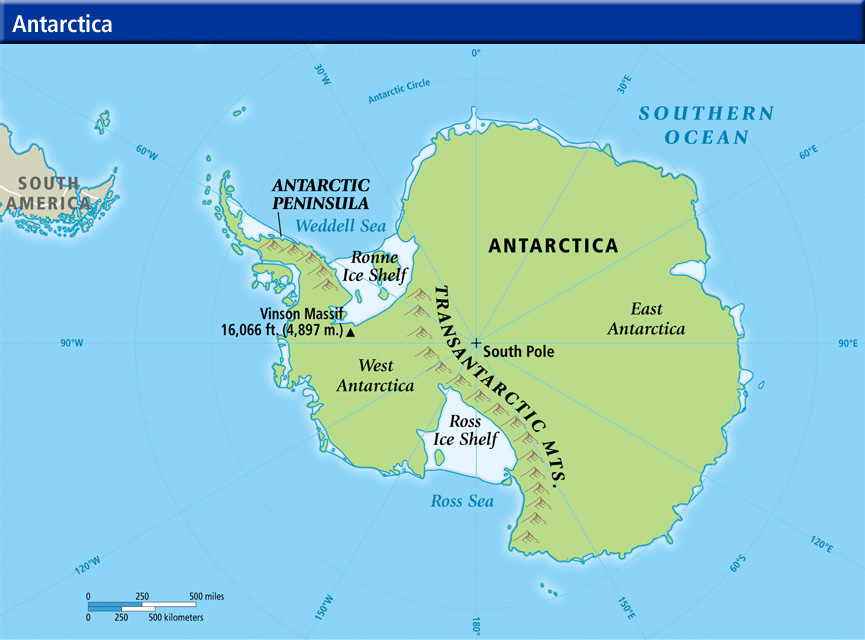
Map of the Transantarctic Mountains

The mountain range stretches between the Oates Coast and the Weddell Sea, the entire width of Antarctica, hence the name. With a total length of about 3,500 km (2,000 mi), the Transantarctic Mountains are one of the longest mountain ranges on Earth. The 100–300 km (60–200 mi) wide range forms the boundary between East and West Antarctica.

The large summits and dry valleys of the TAM are some of the few places in Antarctica not covered by ice, the highest of which rise more than 4,500 metres (14,800 ft) above sea level. The TAM are home to the McMurdo Dry Valleys, the largest stretch of Antarctic snow and ice-free terrain, which occurs due to the extremely limited precipitation and ablation of ice in the valleys. The highest mountain of the TAM is the 4,528 m (14,856 ft) high Mount Kirkpatrick in the Queen Alexandra Range.

== Geology ==
Stratigraphy of southern Victoria Land

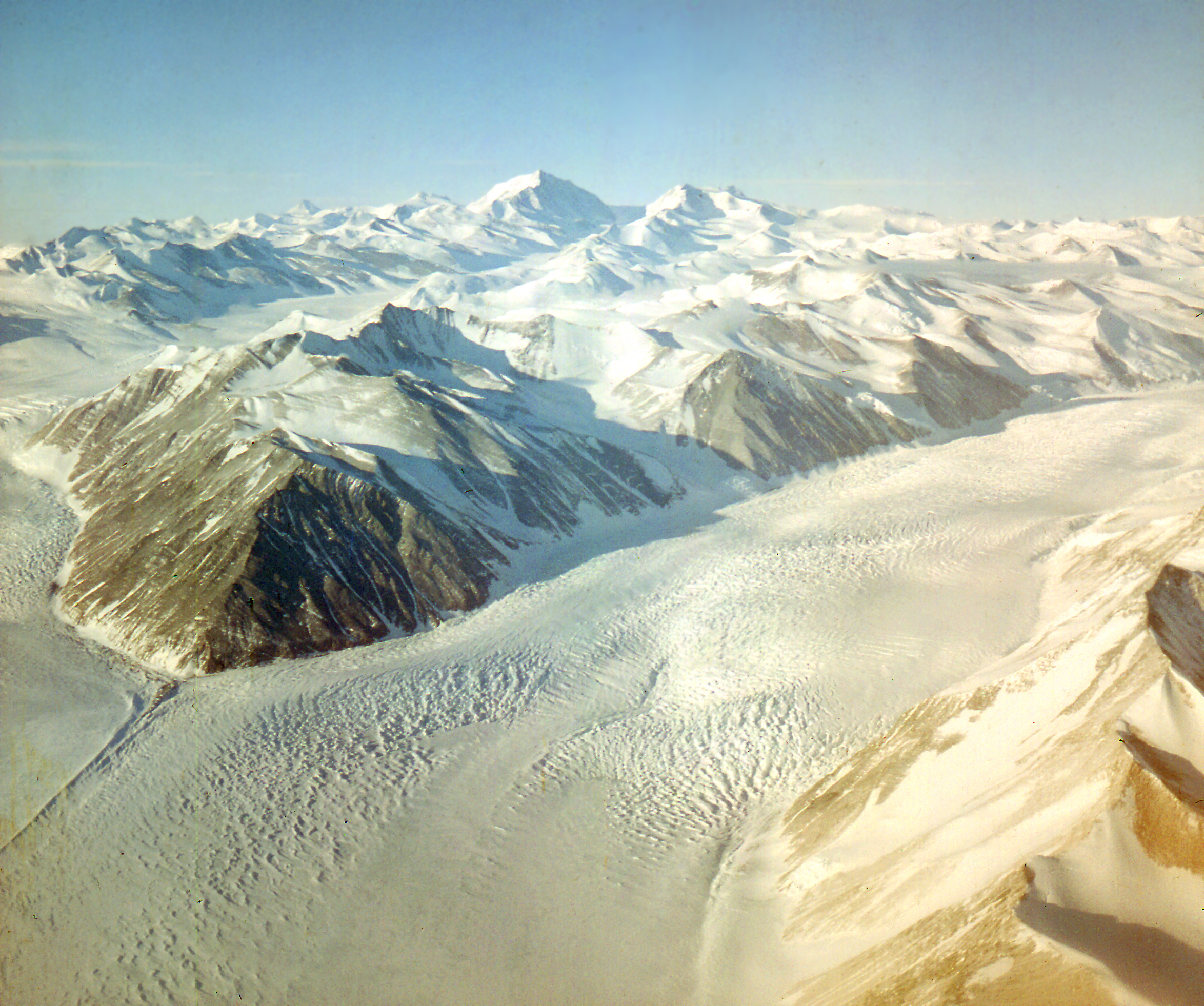
Aerial view of the Dugdale Glacier in 1957

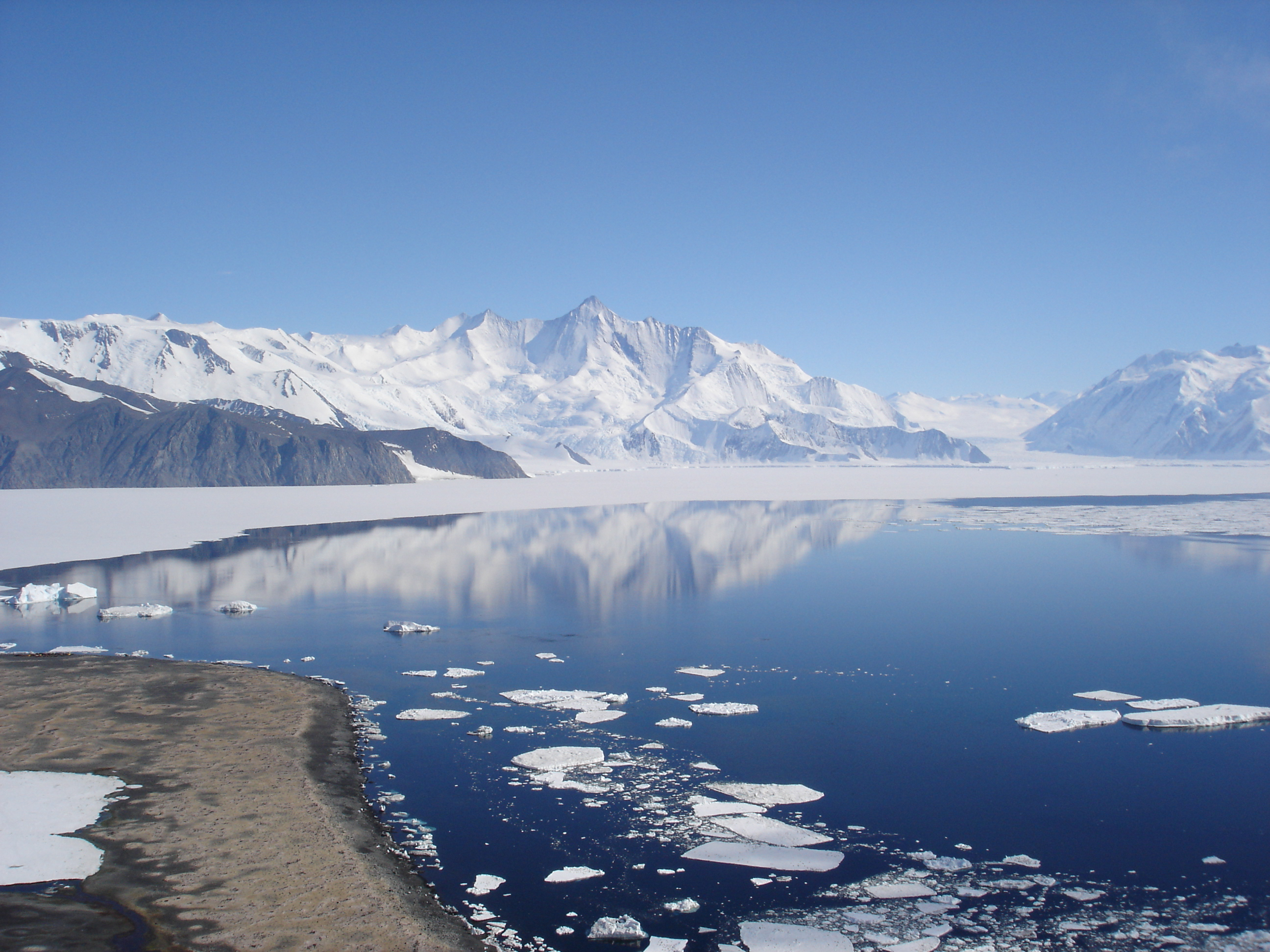
Mount Herschel (3,335 m (10,942 ft)) in the Admiralty Mountains subrange, as seen from Cape Hallett

The Transantarctic Mountains are considerably older than other mountain ranges of the continent, which are mainly volcanic in origin. The range was uplifted during the opening of the West Antarctic Rift System to the east, beginning about 65 million years ago in the early Cenozoic, and soon after became occupied by glaciers.

The mountains consist of sedimentary layers lying upon a basement of granites and gneisses. The sedimentary layers include the Beacon Supergroup sandstones, siltstones, and coal deposited beginning in the Silurian period and continuing into the Jurassic. In many places, the Beacon Supergroup has been intruded by dikes and sills of Jurassic age Ferrar Dolerite. Many of the fossils found in Antarctica are from locations within these sedimentary formations.

Ice from the East Antarctic Ice Sheet flows through the Transantarctic Mountains via a series of outlet glaciers into the Ross Sea, Ross Ice Shelf, and West Antarctic Ice Sheet. These glaciers generally flow perpendicular to the orientation of the range and define subranges and peak groups. It has been thought that many of these outlet glaciers follow the traces of large-scale geologic faults. However, the ice flow theories will be re-evaluated in light of new data from recent ice-penetrating radar surveys which revealed the presence of three previously unknown deep subglacial valleys affecting the "mountainous subglacial topography beneath the ice divide". These geographic features are likely to have a significant impact on models and calculations related to ice flow through the Transantarctic Mountain region.

=== Soils ===
The Transantarctic Mountains have sufficient ice-free terrain for their soil composition to be analysed. The soils of the TAM are largely arid cryosols, as a result of the region's dry and cold polar desert climate. These soils are very salty and have a low water content; the TAM being so dry that permafrost is usually dry-frozen before it can release any moisture.

== Ecology ==
The high elevation and extreme cold of the TAM make them extremely difficult for life to survive in. Penguins, seals, and sea birds live along the Ross Sea coastline in Victoria Land. Forests once covered Antarctica, including plentiful Wollemi pines and southern beeches. However, with the gradual cooling associated with the break-up of Gondwana, these forests gradually disappeared. It is believed that the last trees on the Antarctic continent were on the TAM.

In many regions throughout the range the ecological role of main phototroph is occupied by cyanobacteria, which are distributed throughout the soil. Algae is also an important photosynthesizer, being able to grow in soil and rock crevices, but is limited to the milder areas of the mountain range. Land plants are rare, with scattered populations of moss appearing in summer around meltwater streams. Lichens are more common than moss and have been discovered much further inland, being found on exposed rock faces rather than in soil.

These phototrophs support a small community of microfauna. The most common animals in the TAM are nematode worms, which feed on plant matter alongside smaller populations of tardigrades and rotifers. These animals are in turn preyed upon by mites and springtails, which are the apex predators of the Transantarctic ecosystem.

== History of exploration ==
The Transantarctic Mountains were first seen from the Ross Ice Shelf on the 10th of January 1841 by British Naval officer James Clark Ross and the sailors of the Ross expedition as they attempted to sail to the south magnetic pole. The range is a natural barrier that must be crossed to reach the South Pole from the Ross Ice Shelf.

The first crossing of the Transantarctic Mountains took place during the 1902–1904 British National Antarctic Expedition at the Ross Ice Shelf. A reconnaissance party under the command of Albert Armitage reached 2,700 m (8,900 ft) altitude in 1902. The following year, a party under expedition leader Robert Falcon Scott crossed into East Antarctica at a location now known as Ferrar Glacier, named after the geologist of the expedition. They explored part of Victoria Land on the Antarctic Plateau before returning via the same glacier. In 1908, Ernest Shackleton's party crossed the mountains through the Beardmore Glacier. Scott returned to that same glacier in 1911, while Roald Amundsen crossed the range via the Axel Heiberg Glacier.

Much of the range remained unexplored until the late 1940s and 1950s, when missions such as Operation Highjump and the International Geophysical Year (IGY) made extensive use of aerial photography and concentrated on a thorough investigation of the entire continent. The name "Transantarctic Mountains" was first applied to this range in a 1960 paper by geologist Warren B. Hamilton, following his IGY fieldwork. It was subsequently recommended by the Advisory Committee on Antarctic Names, a US authority on geographic names, in 1962. This purely descriptive label (in contrast to many other geographic names on Antarctica) is internationally accepted at present. The South Pole Traverse currently runs through the TAM.

== See also ==
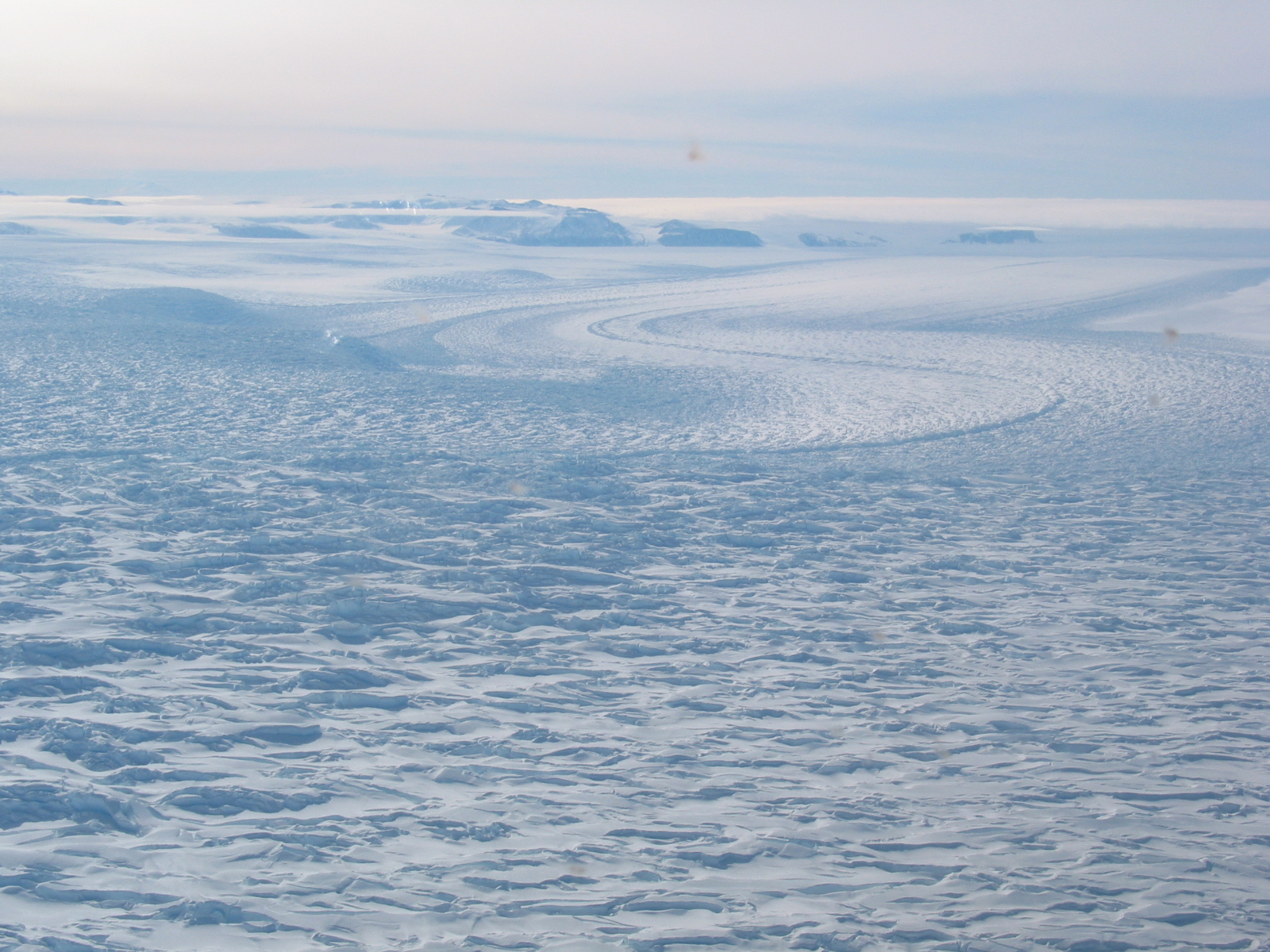
David Glacier with the Drygalski Ice Tongue in the far distance

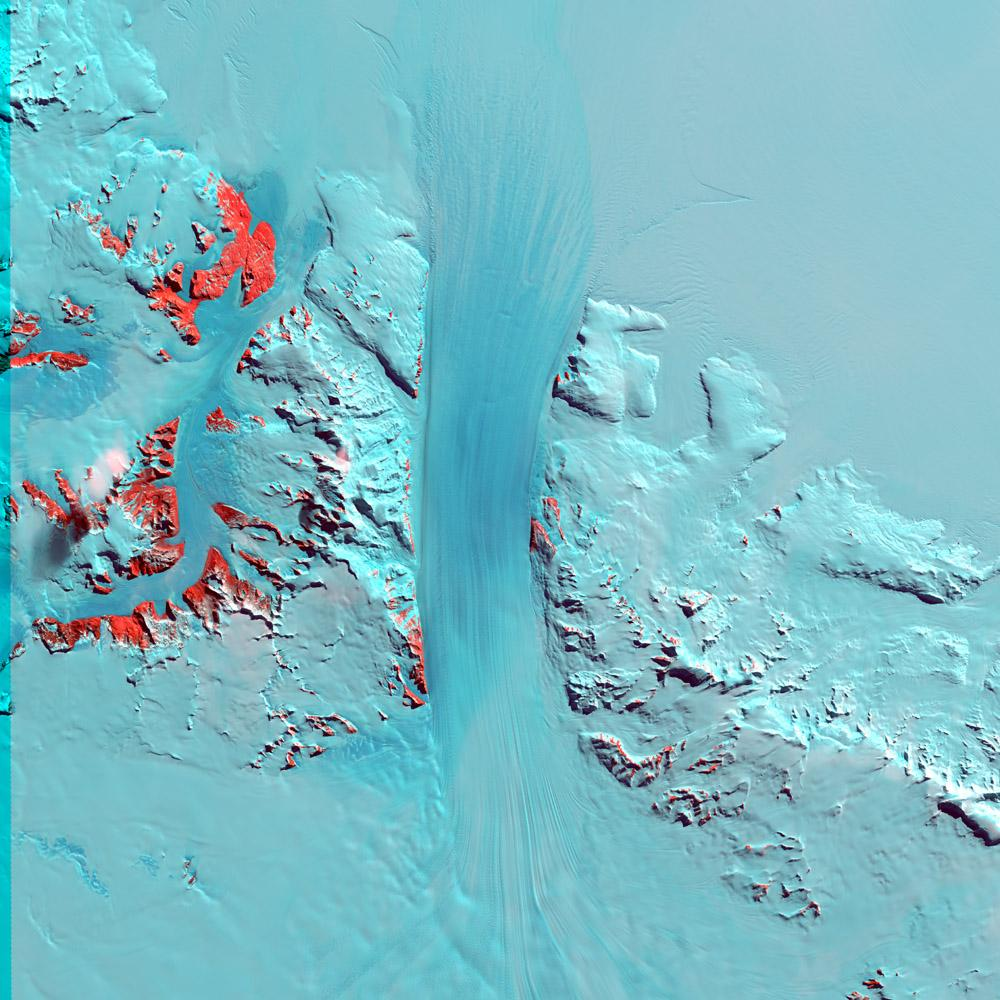
Byrd Glacier from Landsat

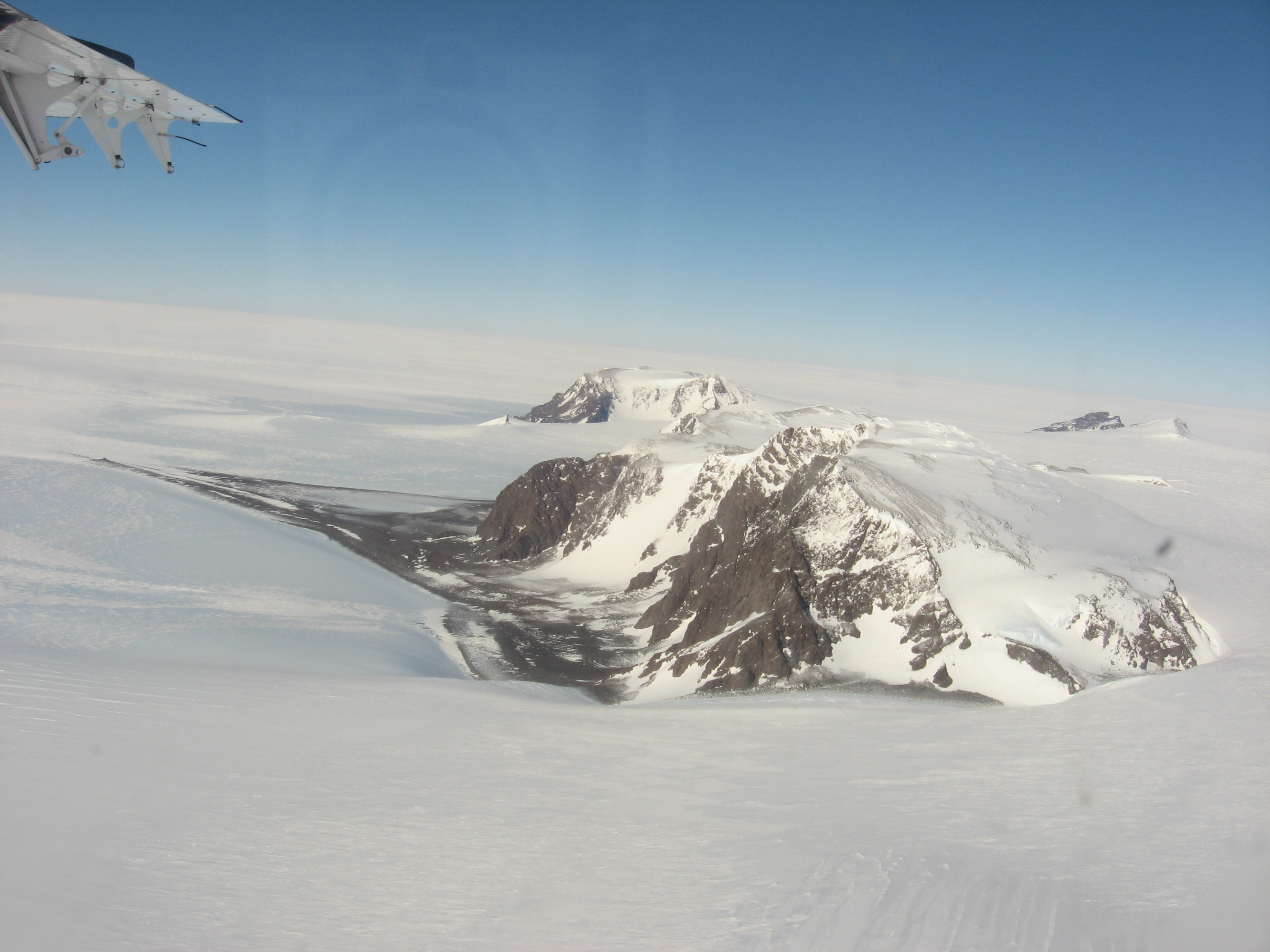
The Thiel Mountains

In geographic order, from the Ross Sea towards the Weddell Sea:

=== Victoria Land ===
- Lillie Glacier
- Concord Mountains
- Cape Adare
- Admiralty Mountains
- Cape Hallett
- Tucker Glacier
- Victory Mountains
- Mariner Glacier
- Aviator Glacier
- Terra Nova Bay
- Priestley Glacier
- Prince Albert Mountains
  - David Glacier and Drygalski Ice Tongue
  - Mackay Glacier
  - McMurdo Dry Valleys
- Ferrar Glacier
- McMurdo Sound

=== Central TAM ===
- Mulock Glacier
- Byrd Glacier
- Nimrod Glacier
- Queen Alexandra Range
- Beardmore Glacier
- Taz Glacier

=== Queen Maud Mountains ===
- Shackleton Glacier
- Liv Glacier
- Amundsen Glacier
- Scott Glacier
- Bush Mountains
- Commonwealth Range
- Dominion Range
- Herbert Range
- Prince Olav Mountains
- Hughes Range
- Supporters Range
- Zorawar Range

=== "Southern" TAM ===
- Reedy Glacier
- Horlick Mountains
- Thiel Mountains
- Pensacola Mountains
  - Support Force Glacier
  - Foundation Ice Stream
- Shackleton Range
- Theron Mountains
  - Bailey Ice Stream

== Bibliography ==
- Barr, Iestyn D.; Spagnolo, Matteo; Rea, Brice R.; Bingham, Robert G.; et al. (21 September 2022). "60 million years of glaciation in the Transantarctic Mountains". Nature Communications. 13 (1): 5526. doi:10.1038/s41467-022-33310-z. ISSN 2041-1723. PMC 9492669. PMID 36130952.
- Campbell, Iain B.; Claridge, Graeme C.C. (2004). "Cryosols of the Arid Antarctic". In John M. Kimble (ed.). Cryosols. Heidelberg: Springer Berlin. p. 291-302. doi:10.1007/978-3-662-06429-0_15. ISBN 978-3-662-06429-0.
- Claridge, Graeme C.C.; Campbell, Iain B. (2004). "The Biology of Arid Cryosols". In John M. Kimble (ed.). Cryosols. Heidelberg: Springer Berlin. p. 573-580. doi:10.1007/978-3-662-06429-0_28. ISBN 978-3-662-06429-0.
- Faure, Gunter; Mensing, Teresa M. (2010). The Transantarctic Mountains: Rocks, Ice, Meteorites and Water (Illustrated ed.). Springer Science & Business Media. ISBN 9789048193905.
- Fernandez-Carazo, Rafael; Hodgson, Dominic A.; Convey, Peter; Wilmotte, Annick (1 September 2011). "Low cyanobacterial diversity in biotopes of the Transantarctic Mountains and Shackleton Range (80–82°S), Antarctica". FEMS Microbiology Ecology. 77 (3): 503–517. doi:10.1111/j.1574-6941.2011.01132.x.
- Fitzgerald, Paul G. (August 1994). "Thermochronologic constraints on post-Paleozoic tectonic evolution of the central Transantarctic Mountains, Antarctica". Tectonics. 13 (4). American Geophysical Union: 818–836. doi:10.1029/94TC00595.
- Goodge, John W. (April 2020). "Geological and tectonic evolution of the Transantarctic Mountains, from ancient craton to recent enigma". Gondwana Research. 80. Elsevier: 50–122. doi:10.1016/j.gr.2019.11.001.
- Hamilton, Warren B. (1960). "New Interpretation of Antarctic Tectonics". U.S. Geological Survey Professional Paper. Denver, Colorado: U.S. Government Printing Office.
- Paerl, Hans W.; Priscu, John Charles (November 1994). "Microbial Phototrophic, Heterotrophic, and Diazotrophic Activities Associated with Aggregates in the Permanent Ice Cover of Lake Bonney, Antarctica". Microbial Ecology. 36 (3). Springer Nature: 221–230. doi:10.1007/s002489900109. ISSN 1432-184X.
- Studinger, Michael; Bell, Robin E.; Buck, W. Roger; Karner, Garry D. (15 April 2004). "Sub-ice geology inland of the Transantarctic Mountains in light of new aerogeophysical data". Earth and Planetary Science Letters. 220 (3–4). Elsevier: 391–408. doi:10.1016/S0012-821X(04)00066-4.
- Stump, Edmund (1995). The Ross Orogen of the Transantarctic Mountains (Illustrated Reprint ed.). Cambridge University Press. ISBN 9780521433143.
- Woodford, James (2000) [1966]. The Wollemi Pine (Illustrated, Reprint, Revised ed.). Melbourne: Text Publishing. pp. 85–104. ISBN 9781876485481.
- Winter, Kate; Ross, Neil; Ferraccioli, Fausto; Jordan, Tom A.; et al. (2018). "Topographic Steering of Enhanced Ice Flow at the Bottleneck Between East and West Antarctica". Geophysical Research Letters. 45 (10): 4899–4907. Bibcode:2018GeoRL..45.4899W. doi:10.1029/2018GL077504.
