= Robert Bingham =

Robert Bingham may refer to:

- Robert Bingham (writer) (1966–1999), American writer and a founding editor of Open City Magazine
- Robert Bingham (American football) (1888–1929), head coach of the Rhode Island Rams football team in 1912
- Robert Worth Bingham (1871–1937), American politician, judge, newspaper publisher and diplomat
- Robert Jefferson Bingham (1824–1870), English photography pioneer
- Robert de Bingham (1180–1246), bishop of Salisbury, 1229–1246
- Bob Bingham (1946–2025), American actor and singer
- Robert Bingham (glaciologist), British reader in glaciology and geophysics at the University of Edinburgh
- Robert Porter Bingham (1903–1982), colonial administrator in British Malaya
