= Mount Wild =

Mount Wild may refer to a mountain in Antarctica:

- Mount Wild (Graham Land)
- Mount Wild (Queen Alexandra Range)
