= Mount Elizabeth (Antarctica) =

Mountain in Ross Dependency, Antarctica

- Location within Antarctica

Highest point
- Elevation: 4,480 m (14,700 ft)
- Prominence: 1,733 m (5,686 ft)
- Listing: Ultra, Ribu
- Coordinates: 83°54′S 168°23′E

Geography
- Location: Antarctica

Mount Elizabeth (83°54′S 168°23′E) is a massive ice-free mountain, 4,480 metres (14,700 ft) high, standing 6 nautical miles (11 km; 6.9 mi) south of Mount Anne in the Queen Alexandra Range, Antarctica.

== Exploration and name ==
Mount Elizabeth was discovered by the British Antarctic Expedition, 1907–09 (BrAE), and named for Elizabeth Dawson-Lambton, a supporter of the expedition.

== Location ==
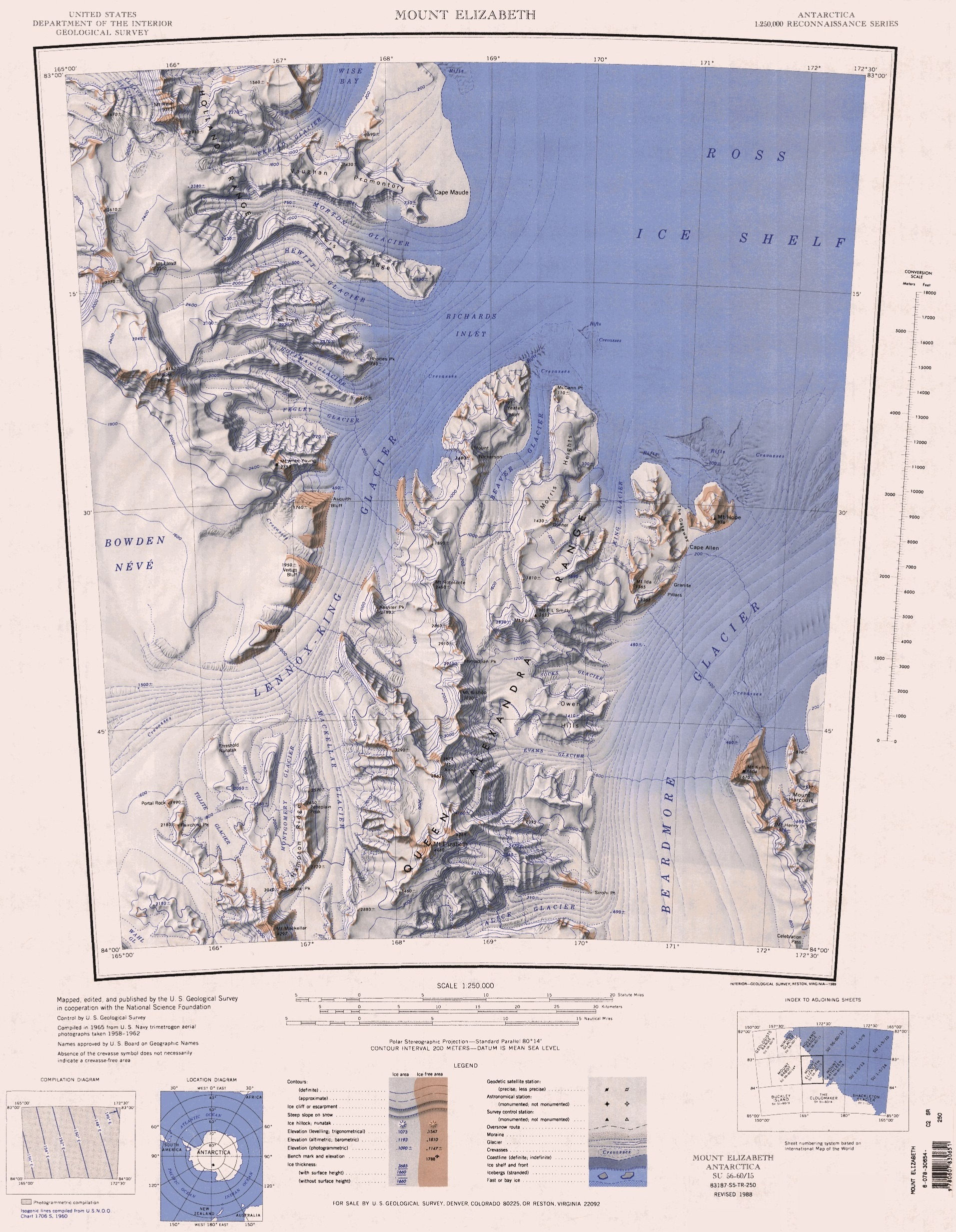
Mount Elizabeth in south center of map

Mount Elizabeth is in the northern part of the Queen Elizabeth Range, to the east of Mackellar Glacier, north of Alice Glacier and west of Beardmore Glacier. Sirohi Point is to the east and the Owen Hills are to the northeast. A line of peaks extends north from Mount Elizabeth including, from south to north, Mount Anne, Mount Bishop, Ahmadjian Peak, Mount Rotolante and Kessler Peak.

== Events ==
On 23 January 2013, C-GKBC (c/n:650), a Kenn Borek Air DHC-6 Twin Otter skiplane, with three Canadians on board, crashed onto Mount Elizabeth. The Emergency Locator Transmitter (ELT) was detected on the same day. The plane had been en route from the South Pole's Amundsen–Scott US station to Terra Nova Bay's Zucchelli Italian station, operating under the auspices of the Italian National Agency for New Technologies, Energy and Sustainable Economic Development (ENEA).

The aircraft was found on 25 January 2013. It had impacted at the 4,000 metres (13,000 ft) level. The New Zealand helicopter rescue team which spotted the wreckage reported that the accident was not survivable. Canada had jurisdiction in investigating the crash. Recovery efforts were ended on 27 January, after having recovered the cockpit voice recorder (CVR), due to unsafe conditions.

== Nearby features ==
=== Sirohi Point ===
83°57′S 170°06′E. A rock point at the north side of the terminus of Alice Glacier, where the latter enters Beardmore Glacier. Named by the United States Advisory Committee on Antarctic Names (US-ACAN) for Girraj S. Sirohi, United States Antarctic Research Program (USARP) biologist at McMurdo Station, 1960-61.

=== Owen Hills ===
83°44′S 169°50′E. An area of rugged ice-covered hills on the west side of Beardmore Glacier, between Socks Glacier and Evans Glacier. Named by US-ACAN for George Owen, Special Assistant for Antarctica in the Department of State, 1959-62.

=== Mount Anne ===
83°48′S 168°30′E. A mountain, 3,870 metres (12,700 ft) high, standing 6 nautical miles (11 km; 6.9 mi) north of Mount Elizabeth. Discovered by the BrAE (1907-09) and named for Anne Dawson-Lambton, a supporter of the expedition.

=== Mount Bishop ===
83°43′S 168°42′E. A prominent mountain, 3,020 metres (9,910 ft) high, standing 2 nautical miles (3.7 km; 2.3 mi) south of Ahmadjian Peak. Named by US-ACAN after Lieutenant Barry Chapman Bishop (1932-94), United States Air Force, an observer with the Argentine Antarctic Expedition (1956-57); member of the Staff of the United States Antarctic Projects Officer, 1958 and 1959; member of the American party which on May 22, 1962, succeeded in climbing Mount Everest.

=== Ahmadjian Peak ===
83°41′S 168°42′E. A prominent ice-covered peak, 2,910 metres (9,550 ft) high, standing 4.5 nautical miles (8.3 km; 5.2 mi) southwest of Mount Fox. Named by US-ACAN for Vernon Ahmadjian, United States ArmyRP biologist at McMurdo Station, 1963-64.

=== Mount Rotolante ===
83°36′S 168°25′E. A mountain, 2,460 metres (8,070 ft) high, standing 6 nautical miles (11 km; 6.9 mi) northwest of Mount Fox. Named by US-ACAN for Ralph A. Rotolante, United States ArmyRP meteorologist at McMurdo Station, 1962.

=== Kessler Peak ===
83°37′S 167°50′E. A conspicuous cone-shaped peak 2,180 metres (7,150 ft) high standing at the east side of Lennox-King Glacier, 4 nautical miles (7.4 km; 4.6 mi) west-southwest of Mount Rotolante. Named by US-ACAN for Captain Charles L. Kessler, United States Navy, Director of Selective Service System for Virginia. Kessler was a member of the ship's party on the Byrd Antarctic Expedition (1928-30) and revisited Antarctica in 1962 and 1965.

== Sources ==
- Alberts, Fred G., ed. (1995), Geographic Names of the Antarctic (PDF) (2 ed.), United States Board on Geographic Names This article incorporates public domain material from websites or documents of the United States Board on Geographic Names.
- "Antarctica Ultra-Prominences", Peaklist.org
- ASN Aircraft accident de Havilland Canada DHC-6 Twin Otter 300 C-GKBC Queen Alexandra Range, Aviation Safety Network, 24 January 2013
- "Flight carrying 3 Canadians missing in Antarctica", New Straits Times, Kuala Lumpur, Associated Press, 23 January 2013, archived from the original on 24 January 2013
- Mount Elizabeth, USGS: United States Geological Survey
- "Officials halt efforts to recover bodies of Canadians in Antarctica crash". Global News. The Canadian Press. 27 January 2013.
- "Plane crash deaths in Antarctica confirmed", The Australian, Surry Hills, New South Wales, AAP, 27 January 2013
- Un avion transportant trois Canadiens est disparu en Antarctique (in French), Société Radio-Canada, 23 January 2013
- Wreckage of missing plane found, crash deemed 'not survivable', CTV News, 26 January 2013
- This article incorporates public domain material from websites or documents of the United States Geological Survey.
