= Mount Falla =

Mountain in Ross Dependency, Antarctica

- Location within Antarctica

Highest point
- Elevation: 4,528 m (14,856 ft)
- Coordinates: 84°22′S 164°55′E

Geography
- Location: Antarctica
- Parent range: Queen Alexandra Range

Mount Falla 84°22′S 164°55′E is a prominent conical mountain, 3,825 metres (12,549 ft) high, standing 3.5 nautical miles (6.5 km; 4.0 mi) northeast of Mount Stonehouse, between Berwick and Prebble Glaciers.

== Exploration and name ==
Mount Falla was sighted in January 1958 by the New Zealand party of the Commonwealth Trans-Antarctic Expedition (CTAE) (1956–58), and named for R.A. Falla, a member of the Ross Sea Committee.

== Location ==
Mount Falla is in the southwest of the Queen Alexandra Range, to the west of Mount Kirkpatrick and north of the Marshall Mountains. Nearby features include Lamping Peak to the north of Prebble Glacier, Fremouw Peak and Golden Cap to the south of Prebble Glacier, and Gordon Valley, Mount Stonehouse and Buttress Peak to the southwest.

== Features ==
Nearby features include:

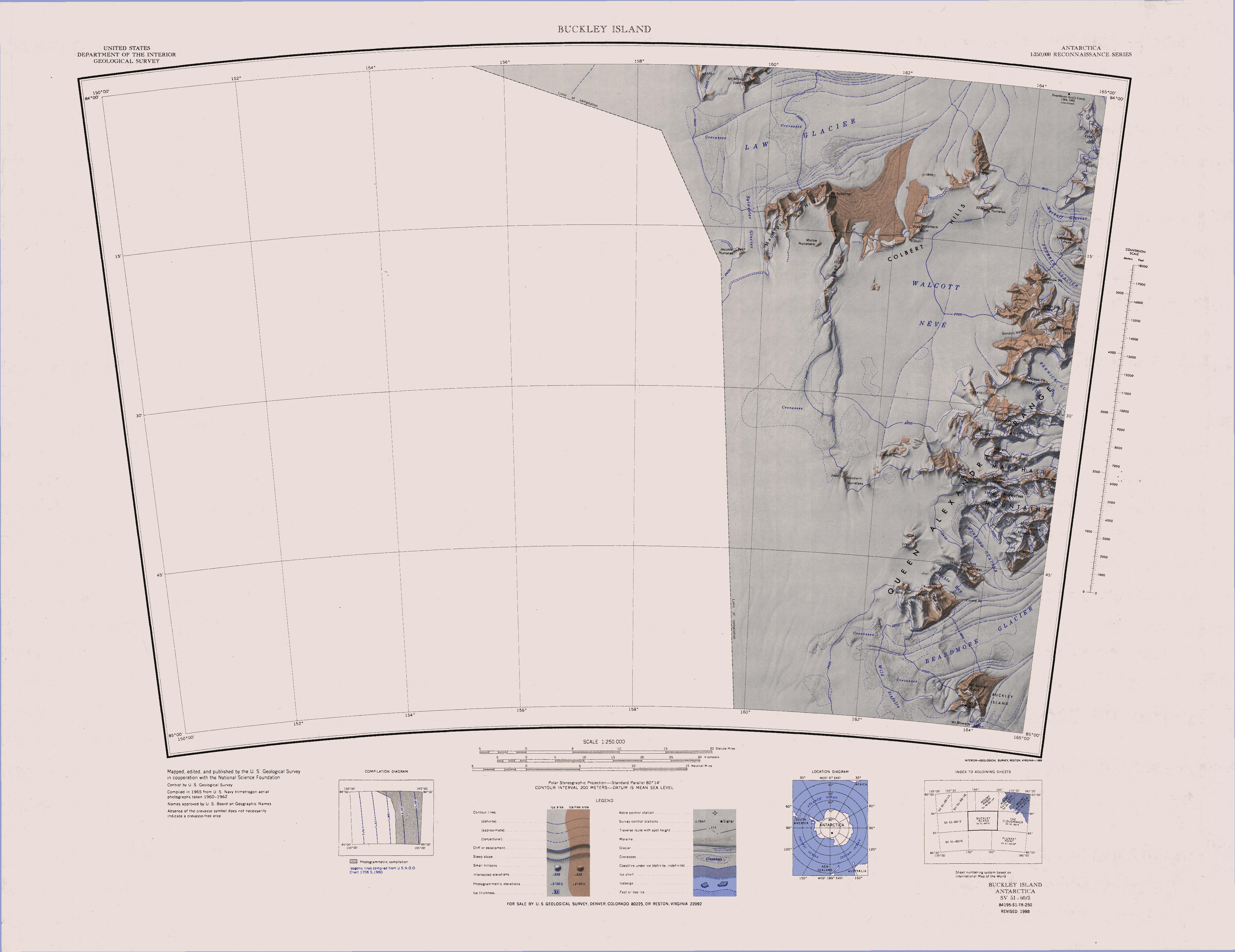
Mount Falla towards the northeast

=== Hanson Spur ===
84.3666667°S 164.7333333°E. A flat-topped ridge, 2 kilometres (1.2 mi) long, trending northwest from Mount Falla. Named by the United States Advisory Committee on Antarctic Names (US-ACAN) in 1995 after Richard E. Hanson, geologist, Ohio State University, who conducted field research in this area, 1990-91.

=== Lamping Peak ===
84°14′S 164°49′E. A rock peak standing between Prebble and Wyckoff Glaciers, on the western slopes of the Queen Alexandra Range. Named by US-ACAN for John T. Lamping, USARP geomagnetist at South Pole Station, 1961.

=== Fremouw Peak ===
84°17′S 164°20′E. A prominent peak, 2,550 metres (8,370 ft) high, forming the south side of the mouth of Prebble Glacier. Named by US-ACAN for Edward J. Fremouw, USARP aurora scientist at South Pole Station, 1959.

=== Golden Cap ===
84°20′S 164°26′E. The highest peak, 2,870 metres (9,420 ft) high, on the ridge running northwest from Mount Falla, about midway between the latter mountain and Fremouw Peak in Queen Alexandra Range. So named by the Ohio State University party to the Queen Alexandra Range (1966–67) because the peak consists mainly of a buff-weathering massive sandstone.

=== Gordon Valley ===
84°23′S 164°00′E. A small valley, the western half of which is occupied by a lobe of ice from Walcott Névé, lying west of Mount Falla. Named by US-ACAN after Mark A. Gordon, USARP aurora scientist at Hallett Station, 1959.

=== Mount Stonehouse ===
84°24′S 164°24′E. A peak, 2,900 metres (9,500 ft) high, standing 3.5 nautical miles (6.5 km; 4.0 mi) southwest of Mount Falla. Named by the New Zealand Geological Survey Antarctic Expedition (NZGSAE) (1961–62) for Bernard Stonehouse who has made studies of Antarctic penguins and seals.

=== Buttress Peak ===
84°27′S 164°16′E. A conical rock peak, 2,950 metres (9,680 ft) high, the eastern part of which projects as a rock buttress into the head of Berwick Glacier, standing 3 nautical miles (5.6 km; 3.5 mi) south of Mount Stonehouse. The descriptive name was given by NZGSAE, 1961-62.

== Sources ==
- Alberts, Fred G., ed. (1995), Geographic Names of the Antarctic (PDF) (2 ed.), United States Board on Geographic Names This article incorporates public domain material from websites or documents of the United States Board on Geographic Names.
- Buckley Island, USGS: United States Geological Survey
- "Hanson Spur", Geographic Names Information System, United States Geological Survey, United States Department of the Interior
- This article incorporates public domain material from websites or documents of the United States Geological Survey.
