= Marshall Mountains =

Antarctic group of mountains

- Location within Antarctica

Highest point
- Elevation: 4,528 m (14,856 ft)

Geography
- Location: Antarctica
- Range coordinates: 84°37′S 164°30′E
- Parent range: Queen Alexandra Range

The Marshall Mountains (84°37′S 164°30′E) are a group of mountains overlooking Beardmore Glacier in the Queen Alexandra Range, Antarctica. They are bounded on the north by Berwick Glacier, and on the south by Swinford Glacier.

== Exploration and name ==
The Marshall Mountains were discovered by the South Polar Party of the British Antarctic Expedition, in 1907–09, and named for Dr. Eric Marshall, surgeon and cartographer to the expedition, who was a member of the Polar Party.

== Location ==
The Marshall Mountains are in the southwest of the Queen Alexandra Range, to the south of Mount Falla, southwest of Mount Kirkpatrick and west of the Adams Mountains. They are bounded by the Beardmore Glacier to the south, the Antarctic Plateau to the west and the Walcott Névé to the northwest. Mount Marshall gives its name to the range. Features to its southeast include Swinford Glacier, Mount Holloway, Table Bay, Mount Augusta, Skaar Ridge and Mount Wild. Features to the north include Blizzard Peak, Blizzard Heights, Lindsay Peak, Mayeda Peak, Storm Peak, Peterson Ridge, Kenyon Peaks, Tempest Peak and Elliot Peak. The Goodwin Nunataks lie to the west.

== Southern features ==
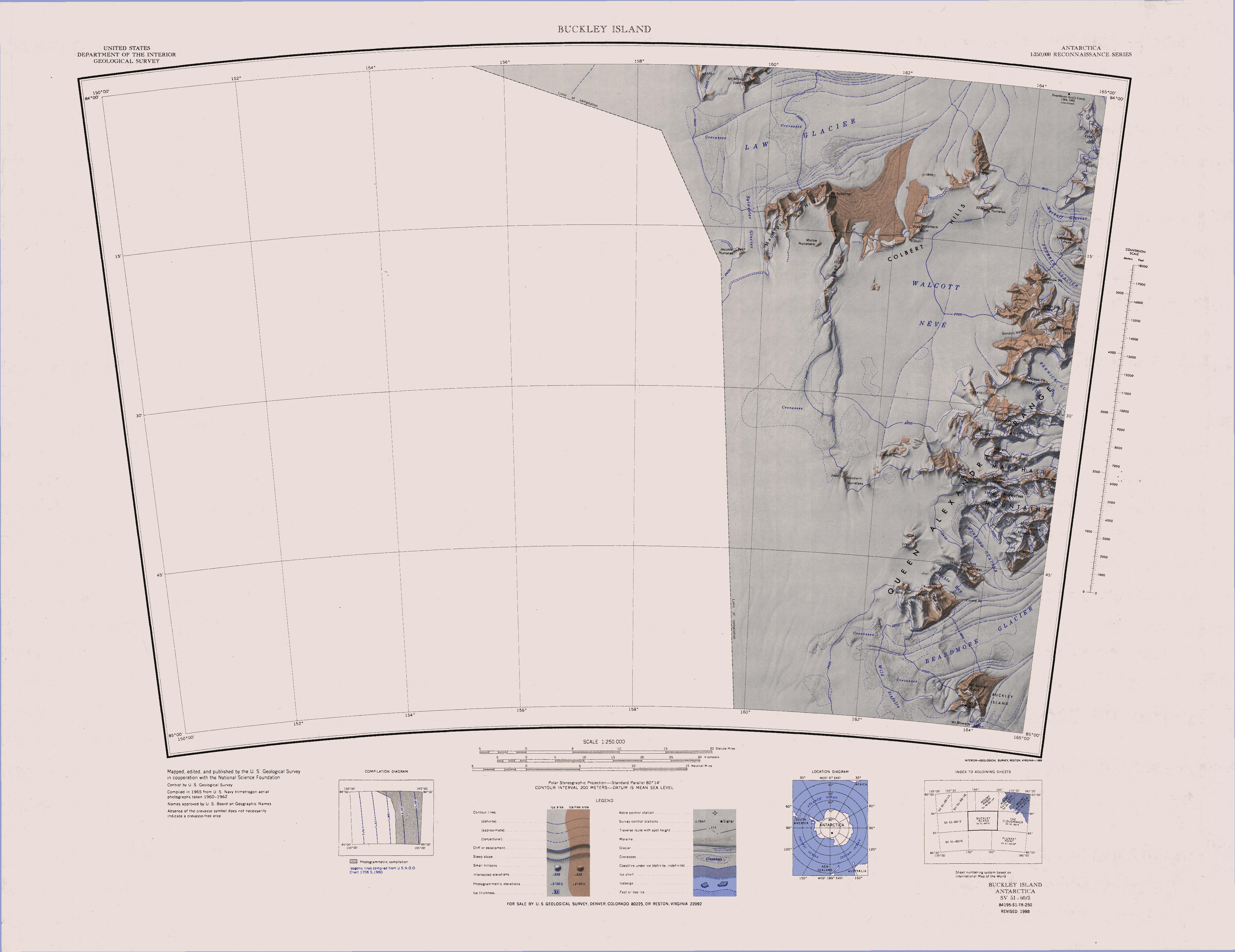
Marshall Mountains towards the southeast

Features to the south include, from east to west:

=== Mount Marshall ===
84°41′S 164°39′E. A prominent peak, 3,160 metres (10,370 ft) high, standing 4 nautical miles (7.4 km; 4.6 mi) southeast of Blizzard Peak. The peak is named in association with the Marshall Mountains, the latter honoring Doctor Eric S. Marshall of the BrAE, 1907-09.

=== Mount Holloway ===
84°45′S 163°36′E. A mountain, 2,650 metres (8,690 ft) high, standing between Swinford Glacier and Table Bay, in Queen Alexandra Range. Named by the United States Advisory Committee on Antarctic Names (US-ACAN) for Harry L. Holloway, United States Antarctic Research Program (USARP) biologist at McMurdo Station, 1964-65.

=== Mount Augusta ===
84°48′S 163°06′E. A peak 2.5 nautical miles (4.6 km; 2.9 mi) east of Mount Wild, at the south end of the Queen Alexandra Range. Discovered by the BrAE (1907-09) and named for Mrs. Swinford Edwards, a relative of Ernest Shackleton.

=== Skaar Ridge ===
84°49′S 163°15′E. A ridge on the southeast side of Mount Augusta. It trends southeast for 2 nautical miles (3.7 km; 2.3 mi) to Beardmore Glacier. This area was first sighted by Shackleton's Southern Journey Party in 1908. The ridge is the site of the only known (1971) Permian peat deposit of Gondwanaland, discovered here by James M. Schopf of the Ohio State University Geological Expedition, 1969-70. Named for Lieutenant Gerhard E. Skaar, United States Navy, who piloted the helicopter that took Schopf to the locality and subsequent discovery.

=== Mount Wild ===
84°48′S 162°40′E. A peak 2.5 nautical miles (4.6 km; 2.9 mi) west of Mount Augusta at the southwest extremity of the Queen Alexandra Range. Discovered by the BrAE (1907-09) and named for Frank Wild, a member of the Southern Polar Party of that expedition.

=== Goodwin Nunataks ===
84°38′S 161°31′E. A small group of isolated nunataks lying about 10 nautical miles (19 km; 12 mi) west of Marshall Mountains, at the south side of Walcott Névé. Named by US-ACAN after Michael L. Goodwin, USARP geomagmetist and seismologist at South Pole Station, 1960.

== Northern features ==
Northern features include, from south to north

=== Blizzard Peak ===
84°38′S 164°08′E. The highest peak 3,375 metres (11,073 ft) high in the Marshall Mountains, standing 4 nautical miles (7.4 km; 4.6 mi) northwest of Mount Marshall. So named by the Northern Party of the New Zealand Geological Survey Antarctic Expedition (NZGSAE) (1961-62) because a blizzard prevented them from reaching it for several days.

=== Blizzard Heights ===
84°37′S 163°53′E. A high, elongate, flattish area in the Marshall Mountains, standing 2 nautical miles (3.7 km; 2.3 mi) northwest of Blizzard Peak, from which it is separated by a broad snow col. The heights are about 2 nautical miles (3.7 km; 2.3 mi) long and rise 550 metres (1,800 ft) high above the surrounding snow surface. So named by the Ohio State University party to the Queen Alexandra Range (1966-67) because of proximity to Blizzard Peak.

=== Lindsay Peak ===
84°37′S 163°32′E. A basalt peak, 3,210 metres (10,530 ft) high, standing 4 nautical miles (7.4 km; 4.6 mi) west-northwest of Blizzard Peak. Named by the Ohio State University party to Queen Alexandra Range (1966-67) for John Lindsay, geologist with the party.

=== Mayeda Peak ===
84°36′S 164°41′E. A peak, 2,890 metres (9,480 ft) high, standing 4.5 nautical miles (8.3 km; 5.2 mi) north of Mount Marshall. Named by US-ACAN for Fred H. Mayeda, United States ArmyRP meteorologist at South Pole Station, 1959.

=== Storm Peak ===
84°35′S 164°00′E. A flat-topped peak, 3,280 metres (10,760 ft) high, standing 3.5 nautical miles (6.5 km; 4.0 mi) north of Blizzard Peak. So named by the NZGSAE (1961-62) because of the stormy conditions experienced in the area.

=== Peterson Ridge ===
84°34′S 163°56′E. High rock ridge that extends north from the west part of Storm Peak massif. Named by the Ohio State University Geological Expedition, 1969-70, for Donald N. Peterson, party member who collected basalt lavas from the ridge forpetrologic and paleomagnetic studies.

=== Kenyon Peaks ===
84°33′S 163°36′E. A small group of basalt peaks 3 nautical miles (5.6 km; 3.5 mi) northwest of Storm Peak. Named by the Ohio State University party to the Queen Alexandra Range (1966-67) for D. Kenyon King, field assistant with the party.

=== Tempest Peak ===
84°31′S 164°11′E. A sharp ice-covered peak 3,410 metres (11,190 ft) high with a subordinate summit 3,345 nautical miles (6,195 km; 3,849 mi) just southward, standing 3 nautical miles (5.6 km; 3.5 mi) north-northeast of Storm Peak. So named by the NZGSAE (1961-62) because of the stormy conditions experienced in the area.

=== Elliot Peak ===
84°31′S 164°04′E. The summit peak of a conspicuous northeast trending basalt ridge, rising 1 nautical mile (1.9 km; 1.2 mi) northwest of Tempest Peak. Named by the Ohio State University party to the Queen Alexandra Range (1966-67) for David H. Elliot, geologist with the party.

=== Kip Peak ===
84.5166667°S 164.4666667°E. A summit rising to over 3,000 metres (9,800 ft), located 3 kilometres (1.9 mi) northeast of Tempest Peak on a northeast trending ridge. Named by US-ACAN in 1995 after Christopher A. (Kip) Miller, geologist, Ohio State University, who conducted field research in this area, 1990-91.

== Sources ==
- Alberts, Fred G., ed. (1995), Geographic Names of the Antarctic (PDF) (2 ed.), United States Board on Geographic Names This article incorporates public domain material from websites or documents of the United States Board on Geographic Names.
- Buckley Island, USGS: United States Geological Survey
- "Kip Peak", Geographic Names Information System, United States Geological Survey, United States Department of the Interior
- This article incorporates public domain material from websites or documents of the United States Geological Survey.
