= Adams Mountains =

Mountain range in Antarctica

- Location within Antarctica

Highest point
- Coordinates: 84°30′S 166°20′E

Geography
- Location: Antarctica
- Parent range: Queen Alexandra Range

The Adams Mountains (84°30′S 166°20′E) are a small but well defined group of mountains in the Queen Alexandra Range, Antarctica. They are bounded by the Beardmore Glacier, Berwick Glacier, Moody Glacier and Bingley Glacier.

== Exploration and name ==
The Adams Mountains were discovered by the British Antarctic Expedition, 1907–09 and named Adams Mountains for Lieutenant Jameson B. Adams, second in command of the expedition. The British Antarctic Expedition, 1910–13 restricted the name to "Mount Adams" for a high peak in the group, but the original name and application are considered more apt and have been approved.

== Location ==
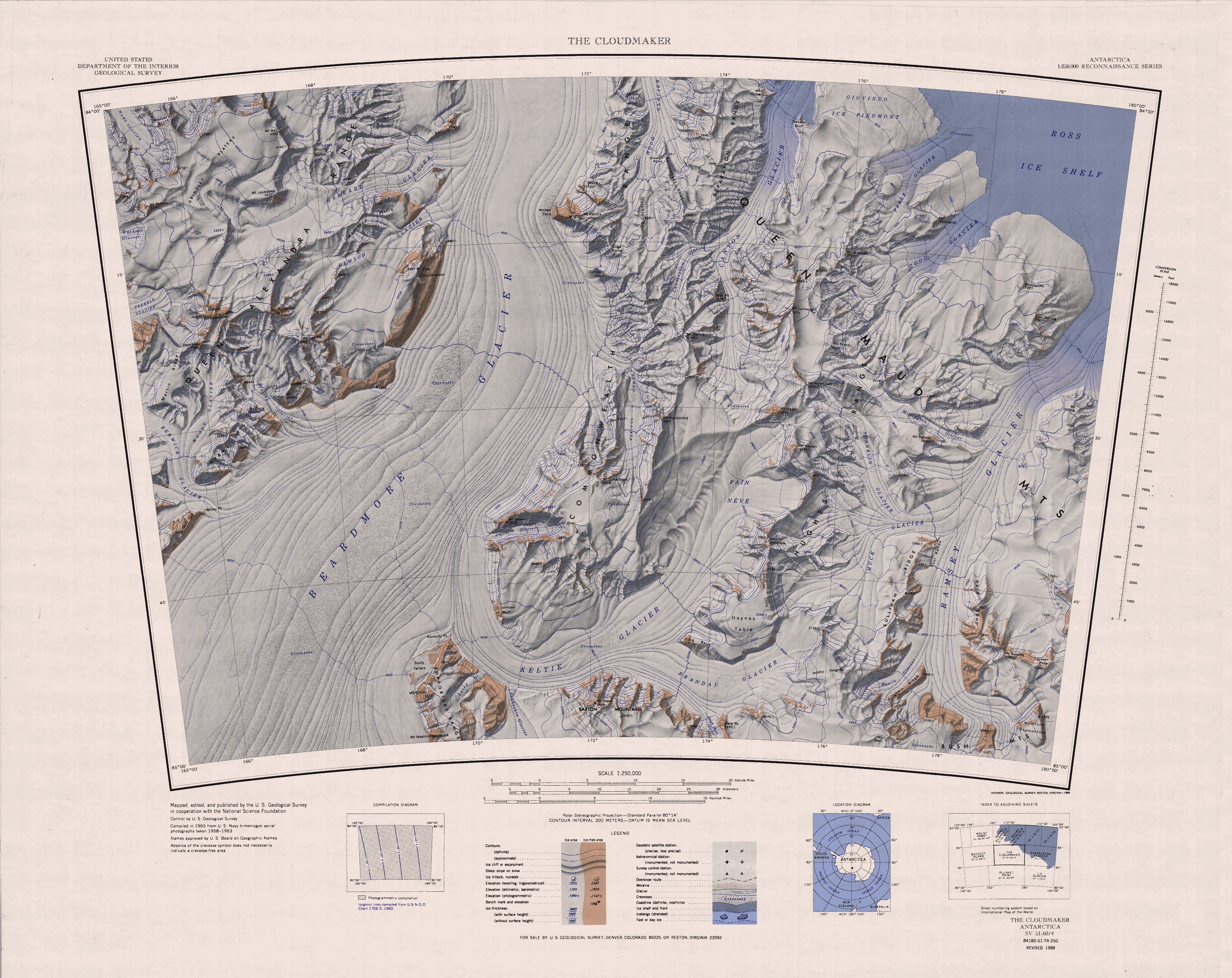
Adams Mountains in west center of map

The Adams Mountains are bounded by the Beardmore Glacier to the southeast. The Berwick Glacier flows past its southwest point, and Moody Glacier, a tributary of the Berwick Glacier, defines its northwest boundary. The Bingley Glacier, a tributary of the Beardmore Glacier, defines the northeast boundary. Peaks include Mount Price and the Thompson Peaks. Mount Drewry and Barnes Peak are to the east.

== Features ==
Features and nearby features include:

=== Mount Price ===
84°29′S 166°38′E. The eastern of two peaks, rising to 3,030 metres (9,940 ft) high at the north end of the Adams Mountains. Named by the United States Advisory Committee on Antarctic Names (US-ACAN) for Rayburn Price, United States Antarctic Research Program (USARP) meteorologist at Hallett Station, 1963.

=== Thompson Peaks ===
84°26′S 166°30′E. Two peaks on the divide between upper Moody Glacier and Bingley Glacier. Named by US-ACAN for Douglas C. Thompson, USARP cosmic rays scientist at McMurdo Station, 1963; South Pole Station, 1965.

=== Mount Drewry ===
84°27′S 167°21′E. A prominent blocklike mountain on the west side of Beardmore Glacier, rising to 2,910 metres (9,550 ft) high between Bingley Glacier and Cherry Icefall. Discovered and roughly mapped by the Southern Journey Party of the BrAE, led by Ernest Shackleton, which was abreast of this mountain on December 13, 1908. Named by US-ACAN in 1986 after David J. Drewry, British glaciologist; a leader of the SPRI-NSF-TUD airborne radio echo sounding program, 1967–79; Director, Scott Polar Research Institute, 1984–87; Director, British Antarctic Survey, from 1987.

=== Barnes Peak ===
84°23′S 167°34′E. A peak, 3,360 metres (11,020 ft) high, standing 4 nautical miles (7.4 km; 4.6 mi) southeast of Mount Dickerson. Named by US-ACAN for Elwood E. Barnes, USARP cosmic rays scientist at Hallett Station, 1963.

== Sources ==
- Alberts, Fred G., ed. (1995), Geographic Names of the Antarctic (PDF) (2 ed.), United States Board on Geographic Names This article incorporates public domain material from websites or documents of the United States Board on Geographic Names.
- The Cloudmaker, USGS: United States Geological Survey
- This article incorporates public domain material from websites or documents of the United States Geological Survey.
