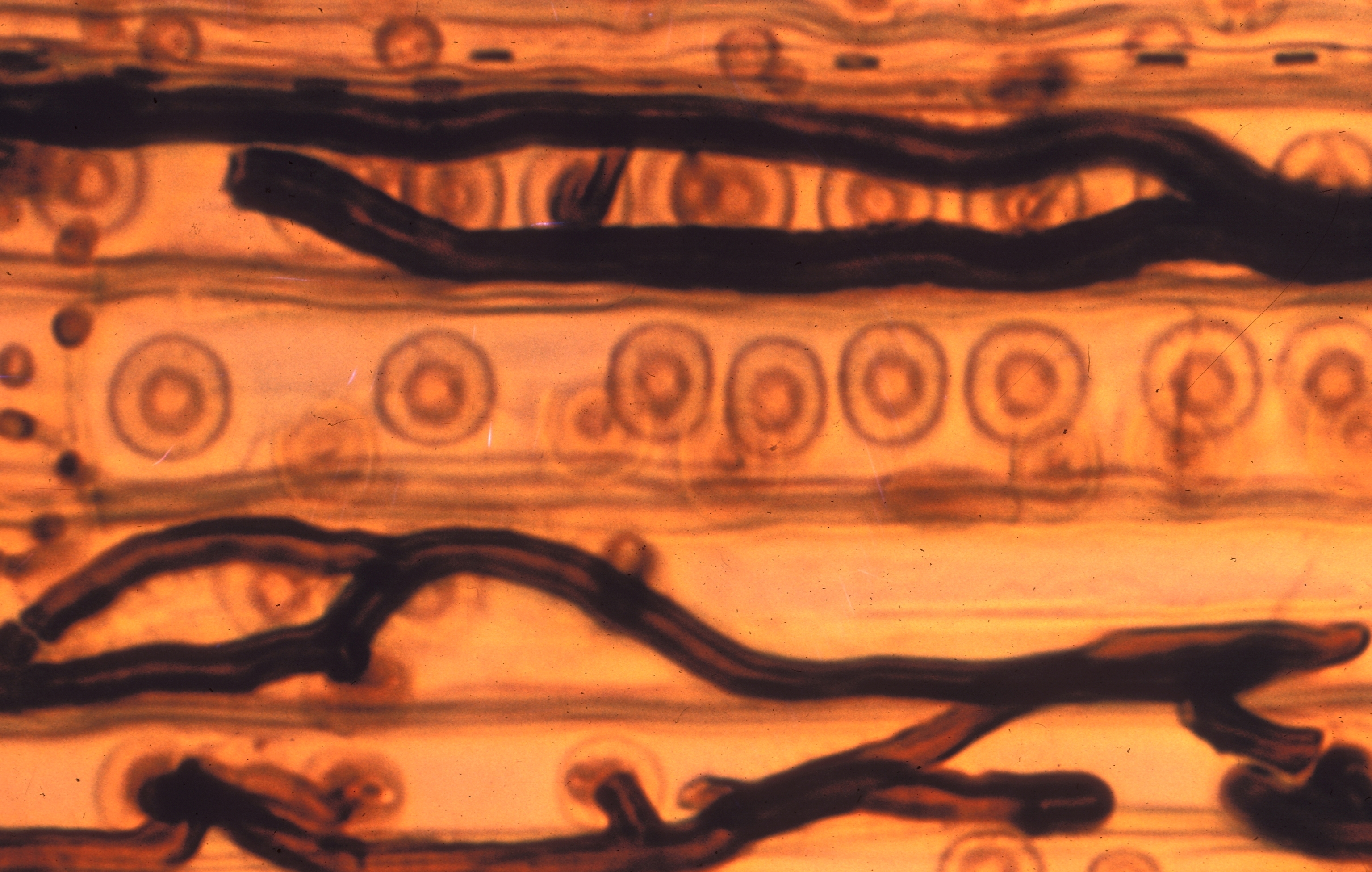
- Ophiostoma wageneri hyphae.

Scientific classification
- Kingdom: Fungi
- Division: Ascomycota
- Class: Sordariomycetes
- Order: Ophiostomatales
- Family: Ophiostomataceae
- Genus: Ophiostoma
- Species: O. wageneri

Binomial name
- Ophiostoma wageneri (Goheen & F.W. Cobb) T.C. Harr., (1987)

Synonyms
- Ceratocystis wageneri Goheen & F.W. Cobb, (1978); Grosmannia wageneri (Goheen & F.W. Cobb) Zipfel, (2006); Leptographium wageneri (W.B. Kendr.) M.J. Wingf., (1985); Leptographium wageneri var. ponderosum (T.C. Harr. & F.W. Cobb) T.C. Harr. & F.W. Cobb, (1987); Leptographium wageneri var. pseudotsugae T.C. Harr. & F.W. Cobb, (1987); Leptographium wageneri var. wageneri (W.B. Kendr.) M.J. Wingf., (1985); Verticicladiella wageneri W.B. Kendr. [as 'wagenerii'], (1962); Verticicladiella wageneri var. ponderosa T.C. Harr. & F.W. Cobb, (1986)

= Ophiostoma wageneri =

Species of fungus

Ophiostoma wageneri is a plant pathogen. Leptographium wageneri var. pseudotsugae develops on Douglas-fir.

== See also ==
- List of Douglas-fir diseases
