= Mount Kirkpatrick =

Highest mountain in the Queen Alexandra Range

- Location within Antarctica

Highest point
- Elevation: 4,528 m (14,856 ft)
- Coordinates: 84°20′S 166°25′E

Geography
- Location: Antarctica
- Parent range: Queen Alexandra Range

Mount Kirkpatrick (84°20′S 166°25′E) is a lofty, generally ice-free mountain in Queen Alexandra Range 5 nautical miles (9.3 km; 5.8 mi) west of Mount Dickerson . At 4,528 metres (14,856 ft) it is the highest point in the Queen Alexandra Range, Antarctica.

== Exploration and name ==
Mount Kirkpatrick was discovered and named by the British Antarctic Expedition, 1907–1909. It was named for a Glasgow businessman, who was one of the original supporters of the expedition.

== Location ==
Mount Kirkpatrick is in the central Queen Alexandra Range to the south of Grindley Plateau, north of the Adams Mountains and northeast of the Marshall Mountains. Prebble Glacier forms on its west slopes and flows west to Lennox-King Glacier. Mount Dickerson is to its east and Decennial Peak to its south. Martin Ridge extends southwest from Decennial Peak to the head of Berwick Glacier.

== Fossil site ==
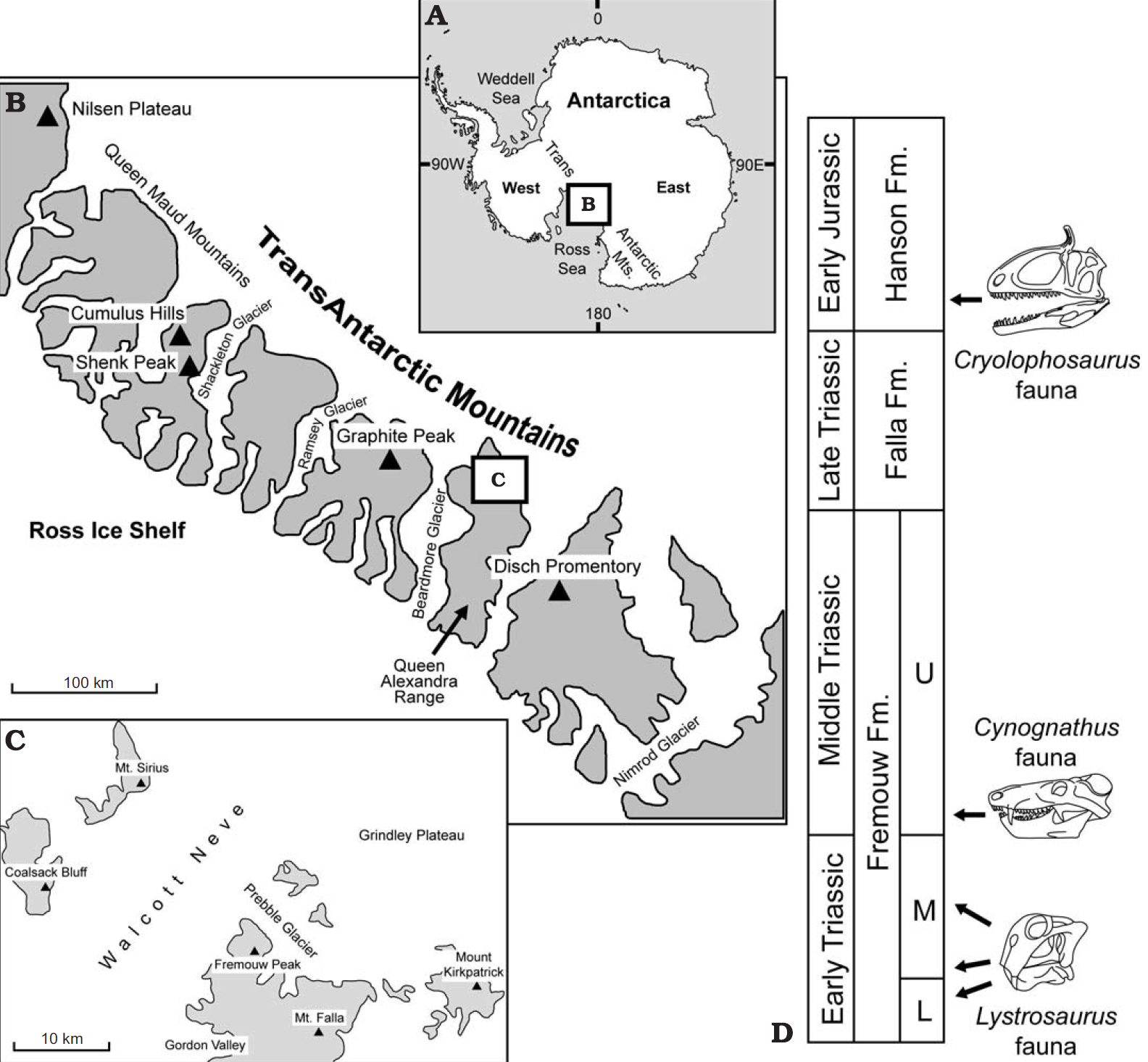
Map showing location of the Mount Kirkpatrick dinosaur site, with stratigraphic context on the right

Mount Kirkpatrick holds one of the most important fossil sites in Antarctica, the Hanson Formation. Because Antarctica used to be warmer and supported dense conifer and cycad forest, and because all the continents were fused into a giant supercontinent called Pangaea, many ancient Antarctic wildlife share relatives elsewhere in the world. Mount Kirkpatrick holds the first non-avian dinosaur scientifically named on the continent, the large theropod Cryolophosaurus named by paleontologists William R. Hammer and William J. Hickerson in 1994. The other genus of non-avian dinosaur from this locality is the early sauropodomorph Glacialisaurus named by Nathan Smith and Diego Pol in 2007. Indeterminate fossils of the herbivorous tritylodont synapsid and dimorphodontid pterosaur have also been identified.

== Features ==
Nearby features include:

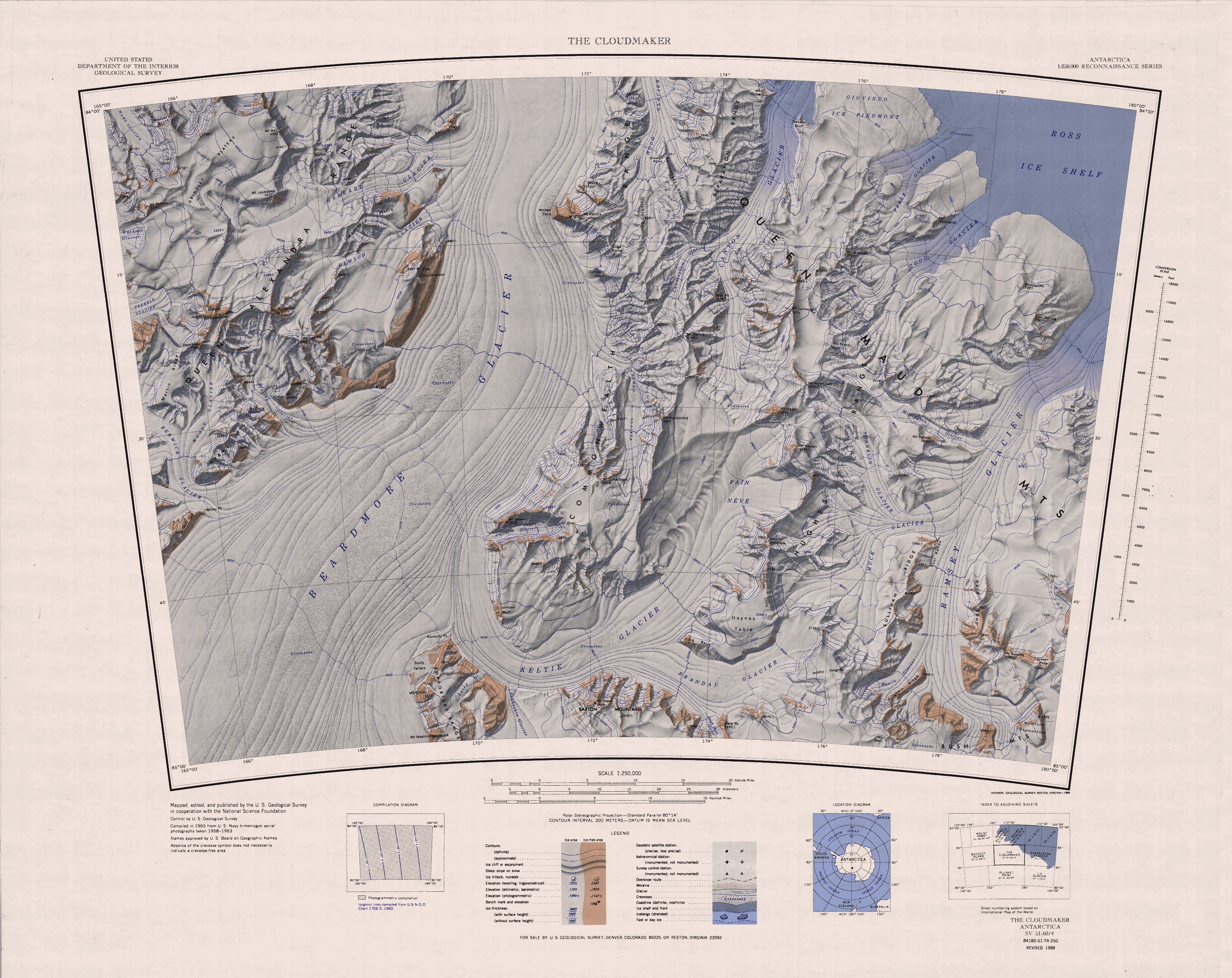
Mount Kirkpatrick in northwest of map

=== Fleming Summit ===
84°20′S 166°18′E. A peak rising to over 4,200 metres (13,800 ft) high, 1.5 kilometres (0.93 mi) west of Mount Kirkpatrick. Named by the United States Advisory Committee on Antarctic Names (US-ACAN) in 1995 after Thomas H. Fleming, geologist, Ohio State University, who conducted field research in this area, 1985-86 and 1990-91.

=== Mount Dickerson ===
84°20′S 167°08′E. A prominent mountain, 4,120 metres (13,520 ft) high, standing 4 nautical miles (7.4 km; 4.6 mi) east of Mount Kirkpatrick. Named by the US-ACAN for Lieutenant Commander Richard G. Dickerson, United States Navy, VX-6 aircraft commander during United States Navy Operation Deep Freeze, 1964.

=== Decennial Peak ===
84°22′S 166°02′E. A peak 4,020 metres (13,190 ft) high situated 3 nautical miles (5.6 km; 3.5 mi) southwest of Mount Kirkpatrick. Mapped by the United States Geological Survey (USGS) from surveys and United States Navy air photos, 1958-65. Named by US-ACAN in recognition of the Decennial of the Institute of Polar Studies, Ohio State University, in 1970, the same year the University celebrated its Centennial. The University and the Institute have been very active in Antarctic investigations since 1960.

=== Martin Ridge ===
84°25′S 165°30′E. A broad ice-covered ridge bordering the west side of upper Moody Glacier. Named by US-ACAN for Major Wilbur E. Martin, United States Army, in charge of trail operations during United States Navy Operation Deep Freeze, 1963.

== Sources ==
- Alberts, Fred G., ed. (1995), Geographic Names of the Antarctic (PDF) (2 ed.), United States Board on Geographic Names This article incorporates public domain material from websites or documents of the United States Board on Geographic Names.
- "Fleming Summit", Geographic Names Information System, United States Geological Survey, United States Department of the Interior
- The Cloudmaker, USGS: United States Geological Survey
- This article incorporates public domain material from websites or documents of the United States Geological Survey.
