= Robert Bingham (glaciologist) =

British glaciologist and geophysicist

Robert George Bingham is a Professor in glaciology and geophysics at the University of Edinburgh. His research focuses on using geophysical, remote sensing, and modelling techniques to understand modern glacial change and processes, and on understanding the landforms left behind by retreating Northern Hemisphere glaciers at the end of the Last Glacial Maximum.

In 2013 he was awarded the Polar Medal, an award given to British citizens in recognition of acquisition of knowledge about polar regions, and who have undertaken polar expeditions in extreme hardship.
