= Morris Heights (East Antarctica) =

Mountain in Ross Dependency, Antarctica

- Location within Antarctica

Highest point
- Coordinates: 83°28′S 169°42′E

Geography
- Continent: Antarctica

Morris Heights (83°28′S 169°42′E) are a relatively smooth ice-covered heights, forming a peninsula-like divide between Beaver Glacier and King Glacier at the north end of the Queen Alexandra Range.

== Name ==
Morris Heights were named by the United States Advisory Committee on Antarctic Names (US-ACAN) for Lieutenant Clarence T. Morris, United States Navy, aerology officer on the staff of the Commander, U.S. Naval Support Force, Antarctica, 1962 and 1963.

== Location ==
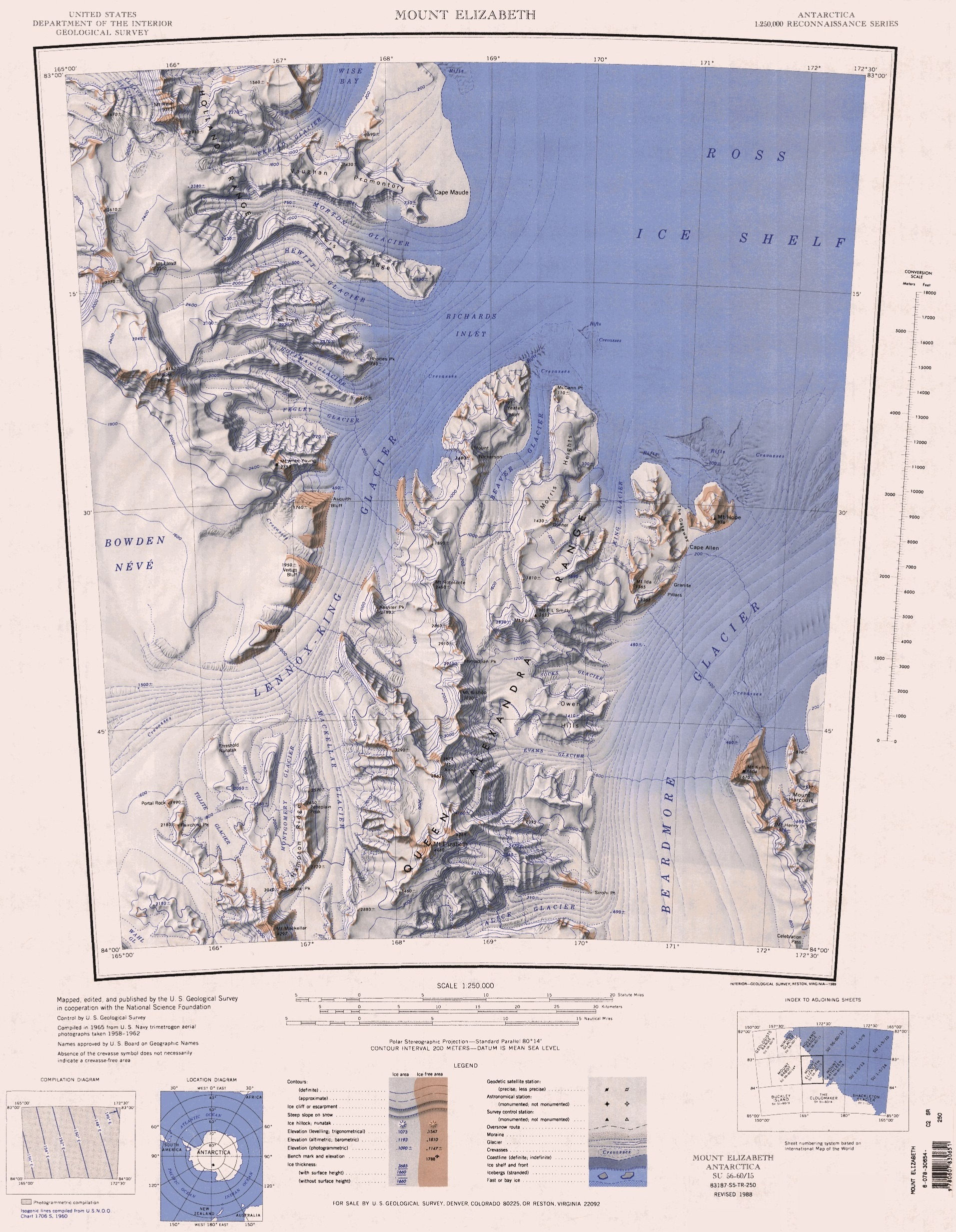
Morris Heights in center of map

Morris Heights are in the northeast of the Queen Alexandra Range between Beaver Glacier and King Glacier. Mount Gunner rises from the south of the heights. McCann Point is at the north end. Nearby features include Mount Nickerson and Yeates Bluff on the peninsula to the northwest at the mouth of Lennox-King Glacier, Mount Ida, Granite Pillars, Cape Allen, The Gateway and Mount Hope on the peninsula to the southeast at the mouth of Beardmore Glacier, and Mount Fox and Mount F. L. Smith to the south.

== Features ==
Features include:

=== Mount Gunner ===
83°32′S 169°38′E. A partially snow-covered peak 1,430 metres (4,690 ft) high that rises from the southern part of Morris Heights. The peak was examined by the Ohio State University Geological Party, 1967-68. Named by US-ACAN for John D. Gunner, Ohio State University geologist and a member of the party to this and other Antarctic localities in three summer seasons, 1967-70.

=== Beaver Glacier ===
83°24′S 169°30′E. A glacier, 15 nautical miles (28 km; 17 mi) long, draining the coastal mountains just northwest of Mount Fox and entering Ross Ice Shelf at McCann Point. Named by the New Zealand Geological Survey Antarctic Expedition (NZGSAE) (1959-60) after the Beaver aircraft City of Auckland, which crashed in this area in January 1960.

=== McCann Point ===
83°22′S 169°38′E. A point marking the east side of the mouth of Beaver Glacier, where the latter enters Ross Ice Shelf. Named by US-ACAN for K.A. McCann, Master of the USNS Pvt. Joseph F. Menell during United States Navy Operation Deep Freeze 1965.

=== King Glacier ===
83°29′S 170°18′E. A glacier close northwest of Mount Ida, flowing north into the Ross Ice Shelf. Named by US-ACAN for Lieutenant Hugh A. King, MC, United States Navy, officer in charge at Hallett Station, 1964.

== Nearby features ==
=== Mount Nickerson ===
83°27′S 168°48′E. A broad mountain, 1,480 metres (4,860 ft) high, standing between Lennox-King and Beaver Glaciers, 4 nautical miles (7.4 km; 4.6 mi) southwest of Yeates Bluff. Named by US-ACAN for Commander N.E. Nickerson, United States Navy, commanding officer of USS Edisto during United States Navy OpDFrz 1965.

=== Yeates Bluff ===
83°23′S 169°10′E. A steep, mainly ice-covered bluff surmounted by a 1,190 metres (3,900 ft) high peak at its north end, standing between Lennox-King and Beaver Glaciers, 4 nautical miles (7.4 km; 4.6 mi) northeast of Mount Nickerson. Named by NZGSAE (1959-60) for Peter A. Yeates, for two seasons radio operator at Scott Base.

=== Mount Ida ===
83°35′S 170°29′E. A conspicuous bare rock mountain, 1,565 metres (5,135 ft) high, standing 2 nautical miles (3.7 km; 2.3 mi) west of Granite Pillars, just southeast of the head of King Glacier. Discovered by the British Antarctic Expedition, 1907–09 (BrAE), and named for Ida Jane Rule of Christchurch, New Zealand, who later married Edward Saunders, Secretary to Ernest Shackleton, who assisted in preparing the narrative of the expedition.

=== Granite Pillars ===
83°36′S 170°45′E. Conspicuous ice-free rock pillars at the west side of lower Beardmore Glacier, 2 nautical miles (3.7 km; 2.3 mi) east of Mount Ida. Discovered by BrAE (1907-09), and first named the "Cathedral Rocks," but changed later to avoid confusion with a feature of that name in the Royal Society Range.

=== Mount Hope ===
83°31′S 171°16′E. A low but conspicuous mountain, 835 metres (2,740 ft) high, marking the west side of the terminus of Beardmore Glacier, at its confluence with the Ross Ice Shelf. Discovered by the BrAE (1907-09) and so named because the Polar Party, after ascending this mountain in the hope of finding a route to the South Pole, saw the great Beardmore Glacier stretching to the south as far as they could see.

=== Mount Fox ===
83°38′S 169°15′E. A mountain, 2,820 metres (9,250 ft) high, standing 1 nautical mile (1.9 km; 1.2 mi) southwest of Mount F. L. Smith. Discovered and named by the BrAE (1907-09).

=== Mount F. L. Smith ===
83°38′S 169°29′E. A mountain, 2,635 metres (8,645 ft) high, standing 1 nautical mile (1.9 km; 1.2 mi) northeast of Mount Fox. Discovered by the BrAE (1907-09) and named for F.L. Smith, London tobacconist, who was a supporter of the expedition.

== Sources ==
- Alberts, Fred G., ed. (1995), Geographic Names of the Antarctic (PDF) (2 ed.), United States Board on Geographic Names This article incorporates public domain material from websites or documents of the United States Board on Geographic Names.
- Mount Elizabeth, USGS: United States Geological Survey
- This article incorporates public domain material from websites or documents of the United States Geological Survey.
