= Mount Young =

Mount Young may refer to:

- Mount Young (Alaska)
- Mount Young (Antarctica)
- Mount Allen Young
- Mount Young (California)
- Mount Young (Falklands)
