= Peletier Plateau =

Plateau in Antarctica

- Location within Antarctica

Highest point
- Coordinates: 83°55′S 159°40′E

Geography
- Continent: Antarctica
- Parent range: Queen Elizabeth Range

The Peletier Plateau (83°55′S 159°40′E) is an ice-covered plateau, about 20 nautical miles (37 km; 23 mi) long and 5 nautical miles (9.3 km; 5.8 mi) wide, forming the southern part of Queen Elizabeth Range.

== Exploration and name ==
The Peletier Plateau was named by the United States Advisory Committee on Antarctic Names (US-ACAN) for Rear Admiral Eugene Peletier, CEC, United States Navy, Bureau of Yards and Docks, who was of assistance to Rear Admiral George J. Dufek in the preparation of United States Navy Operation Deep Freeze II, 1956–57.

== Location ==
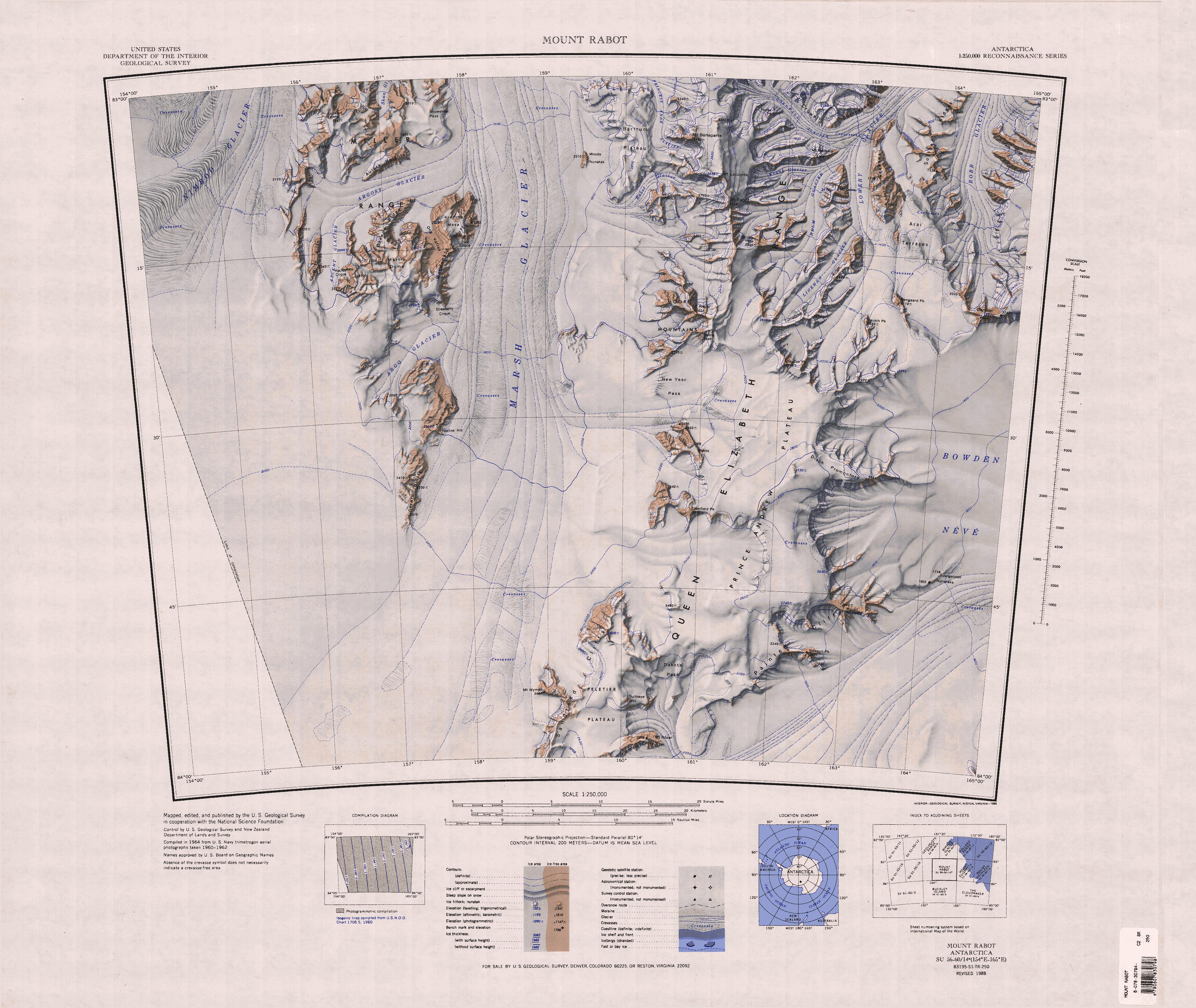
Peletier Plateau in southwest of map

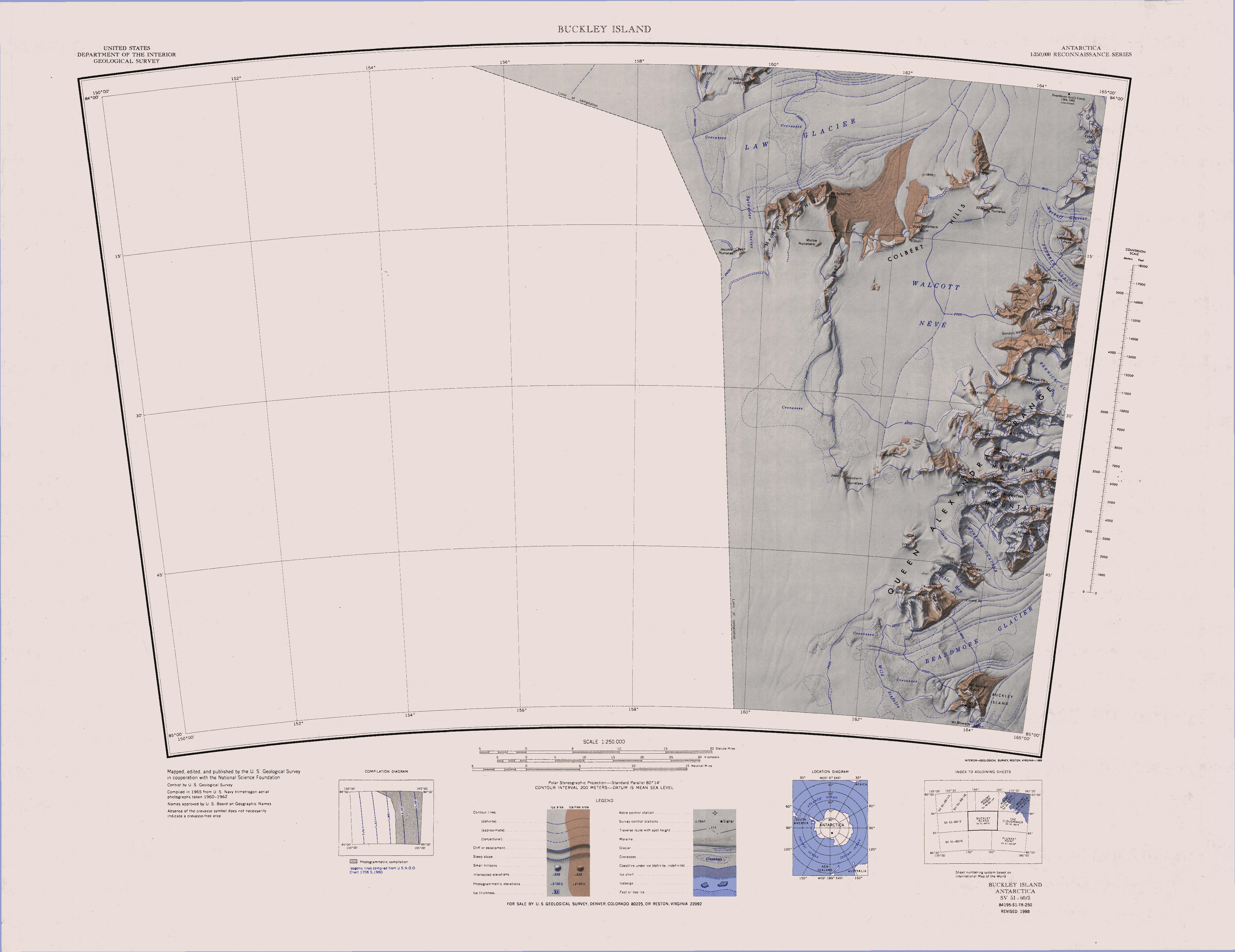
Southern tip of Peletier Plateau in northwest of map

The Peletier Plateau is in the southwest of the Queen Elizabeth Range between the head of Marsh Glacier to the west and Law Glacier to the southeast. Mount Allsup is at its southern tip, at the southwest end of the Canopy Cliffs, which face the Law Glacier. Mount Ropar is at the northeast end of the Canopy Cliffs. The Sandford Cliffs extend along the west side of the plateau, facing the Marsh Glacier. Mount Wyman stands west of them, extending into the glacier. Bullseye Mountain and Dakota Pass are to the northeast of the plateau, leading to Prince Andrew Plateau.

== Features ==
=== Mount Allsup ===
84°01′S 159°36′E. A rock peak, 2,580 metres (8,460 ft) high, marking the southwest limits of the Canopy Cliffs. Named by US-ACAN for Clifford C. Allsup, Aviation Machinist's Mate, United States Navy, who was injured during Operation Deep Freeze II, 1956-57.

=== Canopy Cliffs ===
84°00′S 160°00′E. Steep cliffs extending from Mount Allsup to Mount Ropar on the southeast side of the Peletier Plateau. A descriptive name applied by the Northern Party of the New Zealand Geological Survey Antarctic Expedition (NZGSAE) (1961-62), suggesting the precipitous nature of the cliffs.

=== Mount Ropar ===
83°58′S 160°29′E. A mountain, 2,420 metres (7,940 ft) high, at the east extremity of the Canopy Cliffs. Named by US-ACAN for Nicholas J. Ropar, Jr., Weather Central meteorologist at Little America V, 1958.

=== Sandford Cliffs ===
83°54′S 159°17′E. Distinctive, mainly ice-free cliffs constituting the western limits of the Peletier Plateau. Named by the N.Z. Southern Party of the CTAE (1956-58) for N. Sandford, IGY scientist at Scott Base in 1957.

=== Mount Wyman ===
83°54′S 158°56′E. A mountain, 2,665 metres (8,743 ft) high, at the end of the rock spur running west from the Sandford Cliffs. Named by US-ACAN for Carl O. Wyman, ionospheric scientist at Little America V, 1957.

=== Bullseye Mountain ===
83°55′S 160°05′E. A rounded, mainly ice-covered mountain rising above the Peletier Plateau 4 nautical miles (7.4 km; 4.6 mi) northwest of Mount Ropar. The name given by US-ACAN is descriptive of the semicircular bands of snow on the south side of the mountain.

=== Dakota Pass ===
83°50′S 160°35′E. A low pass in the Queen Elizabeth Range, to the east of the Peletier Plateau. Named by NZGSAE (1961-62) because the pass was used by a Dakota R4D (new designation Skytrain C-47) plane on a reconnaissance flight into the area.

== Sources ==
- Alberts, Fred G., ed. (1995), Geographic Names of the Antarctic (PDF) (2 ed.), United States Board on Geographic Names This article incorporates public domain material from websites or documents of the United States Board on Geographic Names.
- Buckley Island, USGS: United States Geological Survey
- Mount Rabot, USGS: United States Geological Survey
- This article incorporates public domain material from websites or documents of the United States Geological Survey.
