= Prince Andrew Plateau =

Plateau in Antarctica

- Location within Antarctica

Highest point
- Coordinates: 83°38′S 162°00′E

Geography
- Continent: Antarctica
- Parent range: Queen Elizabeth Range

Prince Andrew Plateau (83°38′S 162°00′E) is an ice-covered plateau, about 40 nautical miles (74 km; 46 mi) long and 15 nautical miles (28 km; 17 mi) wide, lying south of Mount Rabot in the Queen Elizabeth Range of Antarctica.

== Exploration and name ==
The Prince Andrew Plateau was named by the New Zealand Geological Survey Antarctic Expedition (NZGSAE) (1961-62) for Andrew Mountbatten-Windsor (then Prince Andrew), son of Queen Elizabeth II of the United Kingdom.

== Location ==
The Prince Andrew Plateau is in the southern Queen Elizabeth Range between the Moore Mountains and Ārai Terraces to the north and the Peletier Plateau to the south. The Marsh Glacier is to the west and the Bowden Névé to the east. Features to the east include Painted Cliffs in the southeast, with Dawson Peak and Mount Picciotto and the Disch Promontary further north. Features to the west include Dakota Pass in the south, Cranfield Peak, Mount Weeks and New Year Pass to the south of the Moore Mountains. Features to the north include Helm Glacier, Linehan Glacier, Turnabout Ridge, January Col, Claydon Peak and Baulch Peak.

== Eastern features ==
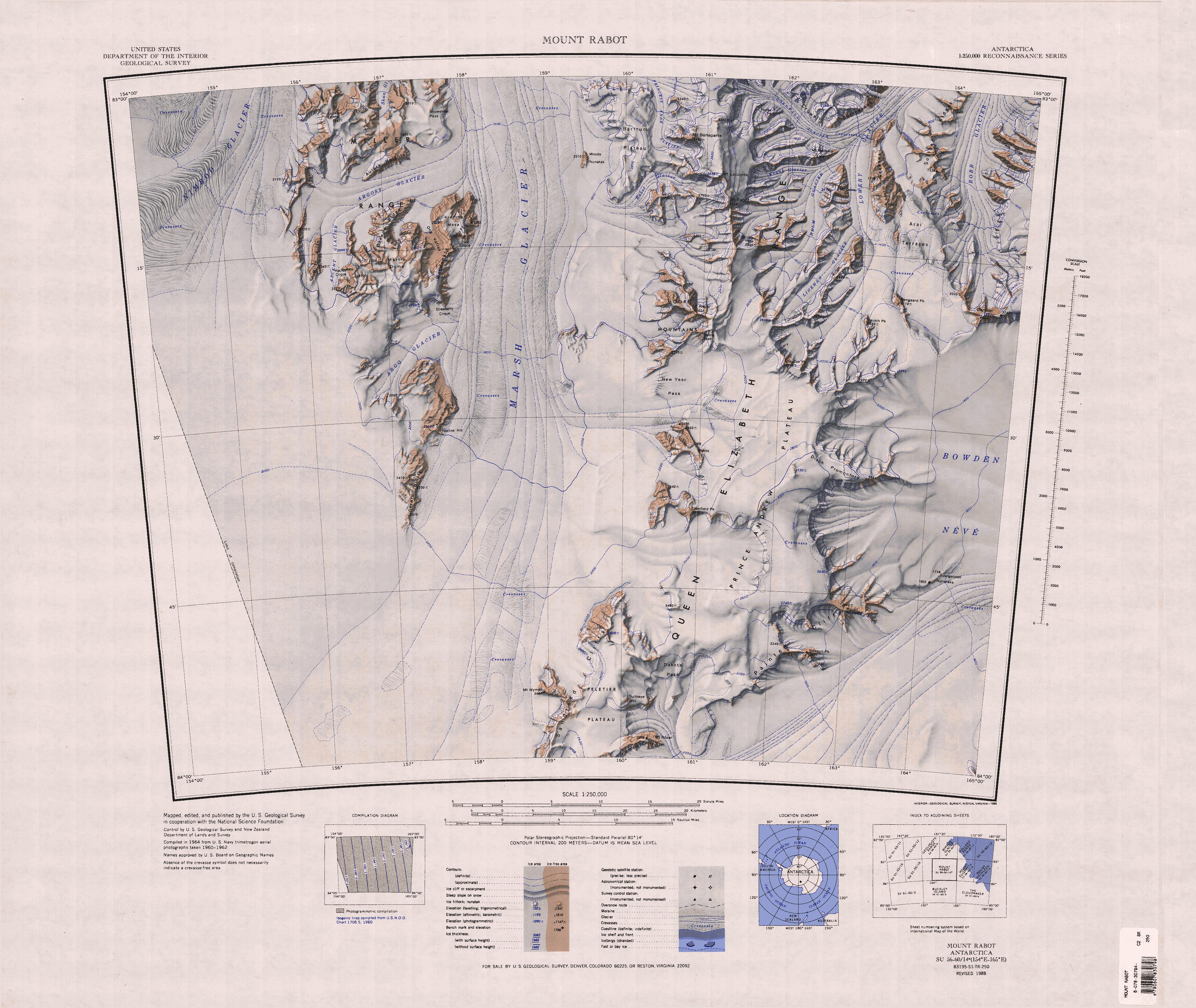
Peletier Plateau in southwest of map

=== Painted Cliffs ===
83°50′S 162°20′E. An irregular line of cliffs which extend southwest from Mount Picciotto and mark the southeast edge of Prince Andrew Plateau. Named by the NZGSAE (1961-62) because of the coloured sedimentary and igneous rock layers exposed on the face of the cliffs.

=== Dawson Peak ===
83°50′S 162°33′E. A prominent ice-free peak, 2,070 metres (6,790 ft) high, 5 nautical miles (9.3 km; 5.8 mi) southwest of Mount Picciotto. Named by the United States Advisory Committee on Antarctic Names (US-ACAN) after John A. Dawson, United States Antarctic Research Program (USARP) aurora scientist at South Pole Station, 1958.

=== Mount Picciotto ===
83°46′S 163°00′E. A prominent, mainly ice-free mountain, 2,560 metres (8,400 ft) high, surmounting the northeast end of Painted Cliffs. Named by US-ACAN for Edgard E. Picciotto, glaciologist at South Pole Station, 1962-63; South Pole-Queen Maud Land Traverse, 1964-65 and 1965-66.

=== Jorgensen Nunataks ===
83°43′S 164°12′E. Two rock nunataks, rising above the ice-covered ridge which descends eastward from Mount Picciotto. Named by US-ACAN for Arthur E. Jorgensen, USARP meteorologist at South Pole Station, winter 1958.

=== Disch Promontary ===
83°34′S 162°52′E. A high, ice-covered promontory, 6 nautical miles (11 km; 6.9 mi) long, extending from the east side of Prince Andrew Plateau. Named by US-ACAN for Carl R. Disch, United States Army ionospheric physicist, who was lost at Byrd Station, May 8, 1965.

== Western features ==
=== Cranfield Peak ===
83°38′S 160°54′E. A peak, 2,850 metres (9,350 ft) high, standing 6 nautical miles (11 km; 6.9 mi) south of Mount Weeks. Tentatively named Sentinel Peak by the N.Z. Southern Survey Party of the Commonwealth Trans-Antarctic Expedition (CTAE) (1956-58), who visited it in 1958. Renamed for Flying Officer W.J. Cranfield who, as one of the pilots operating with the CTAE, gave considerable assistance to the surveying party in this area.

=== Mount Weeks ===
83°33′S 160°54′E. A tabular mountain 6 nautical miles (11 km; 6.9 mi) north of Cranfield Peak, on the western edge of Prince Andrew Plateau. Named by NZGSAE (1961-62) for Lieutenant James W. Weeks, United States Navy, pilot of the reconnaissance and supply flights in the area.

== Northern features ==
=== Turnabout Ridge ===
83°18′S 162°35′E. A high, rugged ridge, 10 nautical miles (19 km; 12 mi) long, lying between Linehan Glacier and Lowery Glacier. Named by the Ohio State University party to the Queen Alexandra Range (1966-67) because the ridge was the furthest point from Base Camp reached by the party.

=== January Col ===
83°24′S 162°00′E. A high col on the north side of Claydon Peak. Approached from New Years Pass by the New Zealand southern party of the CTAE (1956-58), the party was able to gain a view of the mountains to the north and east. Named by the party because they climbed it in January 1958.

=== Claydon Peak ===
83°25′S 162°03′E. A peak, 3,040 metres (9,970 ft) high, which presents a rocky face to the northeast standing just south of January Col. Visited by the New Zealand Southern Survey Party of the CTAE (1956-58) in early 1958. Named by them for Squadron-Leader J.R. Claydon, commanding officer of the Antarctic Flight of the RNZAF, who assisted the survey team operating in this vicinity.

=== Baulch Peak ===
83°21′S 163°05′E. A peak 8 nautical miles (15 km; 9.2 mi) northeast of Claydon Peak, marking the extremity of a spur descending north from Prince Andrew Plateau. Named by US-ACAN for DeeWitt M. Baulch, USARP meteorologist at South Pole Station, 1958.

== Sources ==
- Alberts, Fred G., ed. (1995), Geographic Names of the Antarctic (PDF) (2 ed.), United States Board on Geographic Names This article incorporates public domain material from websites or documents of the United States Board on Geographic Names.
- Mount Rabot, USGS: United States Geological Survey
- This article incorporates public domain material from websites or documents of the United States Geological Survey.
