= Beardmore Glacier =

Glacier in Antarctica

- Location within Antarctica
- Type: Valley glacier
- Location: Queen Maud Mountains
- Coordinates: 83°45′S 171°0′E
- Length: 200 km (125 mi)
- Width: 40 km (25 mi)
- Thickness: unknown
- Terminus: Ross Ice Shelf
- Status: unknown

The Beardmore Glacier in Antarctica is one of the largest valley glaciers in the world, being 200 km (125 mi) long and having a width of 40 km (25 mi). It descends about 2,200 m (7,200 ft) from the Antarctic Plateau to the Ross Ice Shelf and is bordered by the Commonwealth Range of the Queen Maud Mountains on the eastern side and the Queen Alexandra Range of the Central Transantarctic Mountains on the western. Its mouth is east of the Lennox-King Glacier. It is northwest of the Ramsey Glacier.

== Early exploration ==
The glacier is one of the main passages through the Transantarctic Mountains to the great polar plateau beyond, and was one of the early routes to the South Pole despite its steep upward incline.

The glacier was discovered and climbed by Ernest Shackleton during his Nimrod Expedition of 1908. Although Shackleton turned back at latitude 88° 23' S, just 97.5 nautical miles (180.6 km; 112.2 mi) from the South Pole, he established the first proven route towards the pole and, in doing so, became the first person to set foot upon the polar plateau. In 1911–1912, Captain Scott and his Terra Nova Expedition team reached the South Pole by similarly climbing the Beardmore. However, they reached the pole a month after Roald Amundsen and his team, who had chosen a route up the previously unknown Axel Heiberg Glacier. It was on the way back to the Terra Nova expedition's base camp after they left the South Pole that Edgar Evans, one of the members of Scott's chosen team to go on to the final trek to the South Pole, died around the foot of the Beardmore Glacier on February 17, 1912.

== Name ==
Beardmore Glacier was named by Shackleton after Sir William Beardmore, a Scottish industrialist and expedition sponsor. However, Ranulph Fiennes writes that Shackleton had previously told Beardmore's wife, Elspeth, that he would name a glacier after her and it is possible that is what Shackleton actually did.

== Fossils ==
In 2016, the first beetle fossils, in the form of wing-cases (elytra) of the ground beetle Antarctotrechus, around 14 to 20 million years old, were found in sediments adjacent to the glacier.

== Head ==
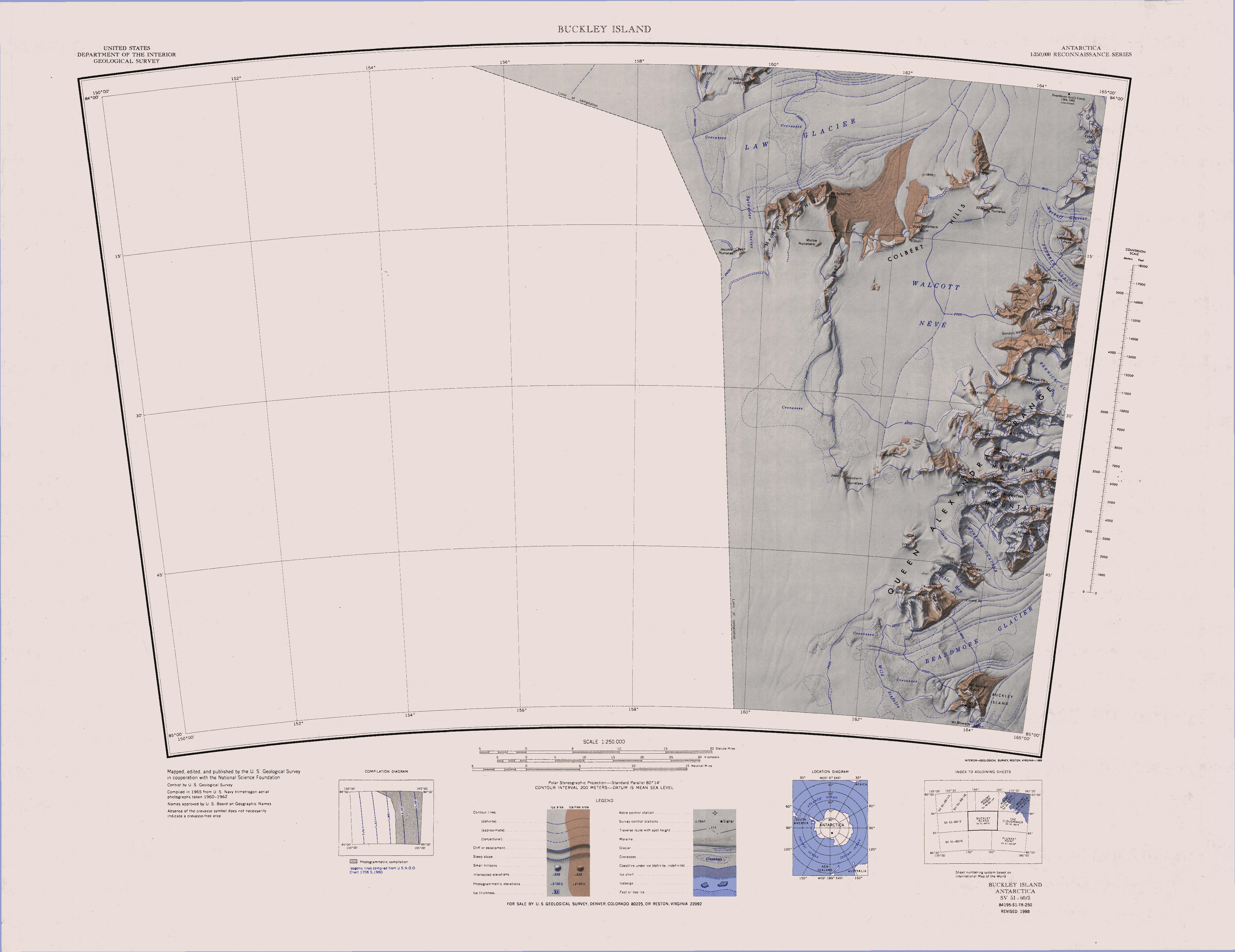
Northern head of the glacier (southeast corner of map)

Southern head of the glacier (northwest corner of map)

Buckley Island separates northern and southern streams at the head of Beardmore Glacier. The Wild Icefalls cross the northern stream, to the west of Skaar Ridge and Buckley Island. The Shackleton Icefalls extend across the southern stream, to the south of Mount Darwin and Buckley Island.

=== Shackleton Icefalls ===
85°08′S 164°00′E. Extensive icefalls of the upper Beardmore Glacier, southward of Mount Darwin and Mount Mills. Named by the British Antarctic Expedition, 1910–13 (BrAE) for Sir Ernest Shackleton, leader of the British Antarctic Expedition, 1907–09, who first penetrated this region.

=== Wild Icefalls ===
84°55′S 162°25′E. The extensive icefalls at the head of Beardmore Glacier, between Mount Wild and Mount Buckley. Named after Frank Wild by the New Zealand Geological Survey Antarctic Expedition (NZGSAE) (1961–62) in association with nearby Mount Wild.

== Left tributaries ==
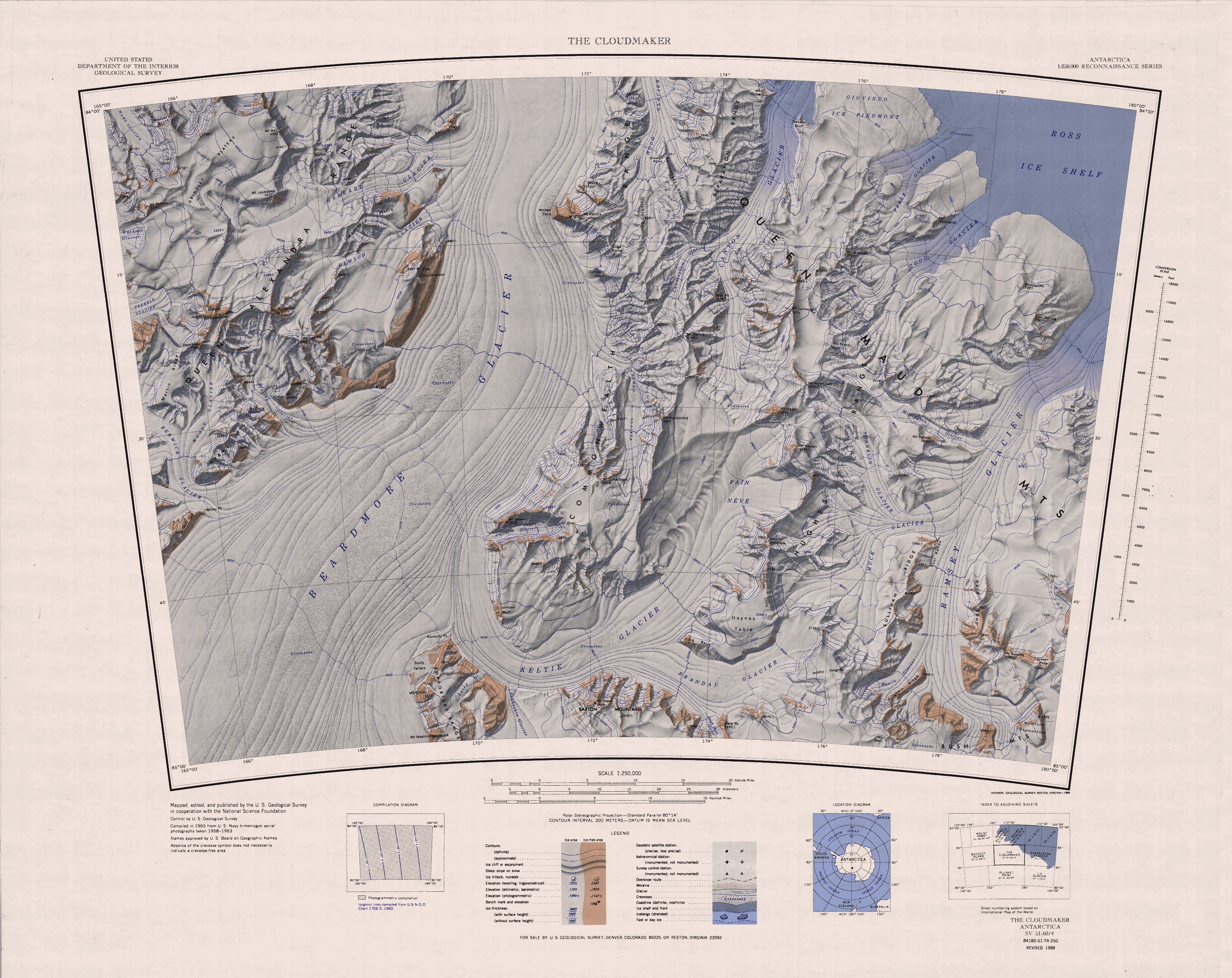
Central section

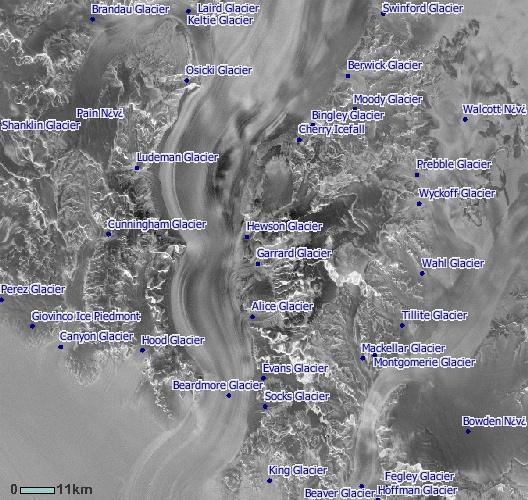
NASA Radarsat Image of the Beardmore Glacier showing glacier names

Tributaries from the left (northwest, Queen Alexandra Range) from west to east include Table Bay and Swinford Glacier near the head. In the central section left tributaries are Berwick Glacier, fed from the left by Moody Glacier, Bingley Glacier, Cherry Icefall, Hewson Glacier and Garrard Glacier. In the lower section the left tributaries include Alice Glacier, Evans Glacier and Socks Glacier.

=== Table Bay ===
84°47′S 163°30′E. A small glacier between Mount Augusta and Mount Holloway in the south part of Queen Alexandra Range draining eastward into Beardmore Glacier at Lizard Point. Evidently named by the Southern Polar Party of the BrAE (1910–13) because of its appearance. The term "Bay" is obviously a misnomer, but it has been retained because of uniform usage for over fifty years.

=== Lizard Point ===
84°48′S 163°40′E. A low morainic point along the west side of upper Beardmore Glacier, marking the south side of the entrance to glacier-filled Table Bay. Named by the BrAE, 1910-13.

=== Swinford Glacier ===
84°45′S 164°10′E. A tributary glacier, 6 nautical miles (11 km; 6.9 mi) long, flowing southeast between Mount Holloway and Marshall Mountains to enter Beardmore Glacier. Discovered by the BrAE (1907–09) and named by Shackleton for his eldest son, Raymond Swinford. The map of the BrAE (1910–13) and some subsequent maps transpose the positions of Swinford Glacier and Berwick Glacier. The latter lies 12 nautical miles (22 km; 14 mi) northeastward. The original appellation (BrAE, 1907–09) of Swinford Glacier is the one recommended. Not: Berwick Glacier.

=== Berwick Glacier ===
84°36′S 165°45′E. A tributary glacier, 14 nautical miles (26 km; 16 mi) long, flowing southeast between Marshall Mountains and Adams Mountains to enter Beardmore Glacier at Willey Point. Named by BrAE (1907–09) after HMS Berwick, a vessel on which Lt. Jameson B. Adams of BrAE had served. The map of the BrAE (1910–13) and some subsequent maps transpose the positions of Berwick Glacier and Swinford Glacier. The latter lies 12 nautical miles (22 km; 14 mi) south westward. The original appellation (BrAE, 1907–09) of Berwick Glacier is the one recommended. Not: Swinford Glacier.

=== Moody Glacier ===
84°30′S 165°48′E. A glacier between Martin Ridge and Adams Mountains in the Queen Alexandra Range, draining south into Berwick Glacier. Named by the Advisory Committee on Antarctic Names (US-ACAN) for Construction Electrician P.R. Moody, United States Navy, at McMurdo Station, winter 1963.

=== Bingley Glacier ===
84°29′S 167°10′E. A glacier 8 nautical miles (15 km; 9.2 mi) long in Queen Alexandra Range, draining south from the slopes of Mount Kirkpatrick, Mount Dickerson and Barnes Peak and entering Beardmore Glacier just north of Adams Mountains. Named by E.H. Shackleton (BrAE, 1907–09) after Bingley, England, the ancestral home of the Shackleton family.

=== Cherry Icefall ===
84°27′S 167°40′E. A small, steep icefall on the south side, of Barnes Peak in Queen Alexandra Range, descending toward Beardmore Glacier. Originally named "Cherry Glacier" by the BrAE (1910–13), for Apsley Cherry-Garrard, zoologist with the expedition. The name has been amended on the recommendation of the NZGSAE (1961–62) to be more descriptive of the feature. Not: Cherry Glacier.

=== Hewson Glacier ===
84°12′S 169°45′E. A glacier in the Queen Alexandra Range, 15 nautical miles (28 km; 17 mi) long, flowing northeast to enter Beardmore Glacier just north of The Cloudmaker. Named by the NZGSAE (1961–62) for Ronald Hewson, surveyor with the expedition.

=== Garrard Glacier ===
84°07′S 169°35′E A glacier in Queen Alexandra Range, draining eastward from the névé between Mount Lockwood and Mount Kirkpatrick and entering Beardmore Glacier south of Bell Bluff. It appears that BrAE (1910–13) applied the name "Garrard Glacier" to the feature which had been named Bingley Glacier by Shackleton in 1908. The area was surveyed by NZGSAE (1961–62), who retained Bingley Glacier on the basis of priority and reapplied the name Garrard Glacier to this previously unnamed feature. Named for Apsley Cherry-Garrard, zoologist with BrAE (1910-13).

=== Alice Glacier ===
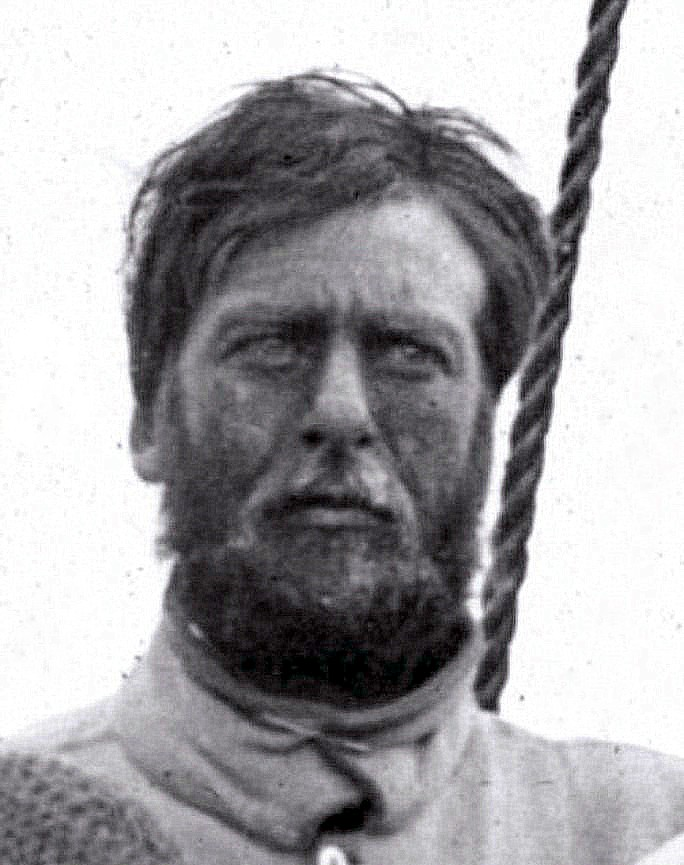
Eric Marshall

83°58′S 170°00′E. A tributary glacier, 13 nautical miles (24 km; 15 mi) long, flowing east from the Queen Alexandra Range to enter Beardmore Glacier at Sirohi Point. Discovered by BrAE (1907–09) and named for the mother of Dr. Eric Marshall, a member of Shackleton's South Polar Party.

=== Evans Glacier ===
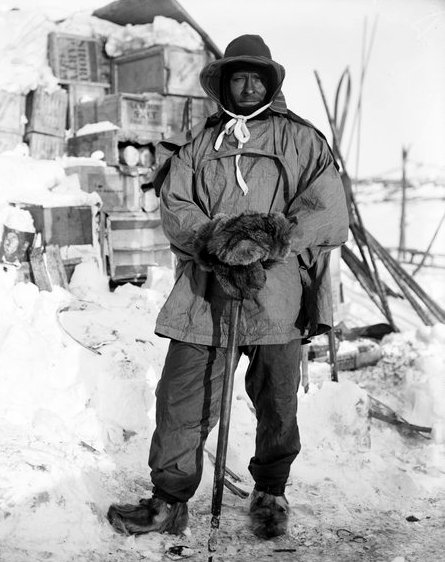
Edgar Evans

83°47′S 170°00′E. A tributary glacier just south of Owen Hills, flowing east from the Queen Alexandra Range into Beardmore Glacier. Named by the NZGSAE (1961–62) for Petty Officer Edgar Evans, a member of Scott's South Pole Party of the BrAE (1910-13), who died near here.

=== Socks Glacier ===
83°42′S 170°05′E. A small glacier descending the east slopes of Queen Alexandra Range just north of Owen Hills to enter the west side of Beardmore Glacier. Discovered by the BrAE (1907–09) and named for one of the ponies taken with the South Pole Party. Socks, the last pony to survive the journey, fell into a crevasse on Dec. 7, 1908, on Beardmore Glacier near Socks Glacier.

== Right tributaries ==
Tributaries from the right (southeast, Queen Maud Mountains), just below the head of the Beardmore Glacier, are the large Mill Glacier and the large Keltie Glacier, then the smaller Osicki Glacier and Ludeman Glacier.

=== Mill Glacier ===
85°10′S 168°30′E. A tributary glacier, 10 nautical miles (19 km; 12 mi) wide, flowing northwest between the Dominion Range and the Supporters Range into Beardmore Glacier. Discovered by the BrAE (1907–09) and named for Hugh Robert Mill, British geographer and Antarctic historian. The Mill Glacier flowing from the southeast converges with the Beardmore Glacier flowing from the southwest below Plunket Point, the northernmost extreme of the Meyer Desert. The Mill Glacier is fed from the right by the Mill Stream Glacier, which in turn is fed by the Burgess Glacier. Above this point on the Mill Glacier are the Scott Icefalls.

=== Keltie Glacier ===
84°53′S 170°20′E. A large glacier, 30 nautical miles (56 km; 35 mi) long, draining from Pain Névé southwest around the southern extremity of Commonwealth Range, and then northwest to enter Beardmore Glacier at Ranfurly Point. Discovered by the BrAE (1907–09) who named it for Sir John Scott Keltie, Secretary of the Royal Geographical Society, 1892-1915.

=== Osicki Glacier ===
84°41′S 170°45′E. A narrow, deeply entrenched glacier just south of Mount Deakin in the Commonwealth Range, flowing west into Beardmore Glacier. Named by US-AC AN for Kenneth J. Osicki, USARP biologist at McMurdo Station, 1963.

=== Ludeman Glacier ===
84°27′S 172°40′E. A valley glacier, 13 nautical miles (24 km; 15 mi) long, flowing north through the Commonwealth Range to enter the east side of Beardmore Glacier at a point 12 nautical miles (22 km; 14 mi) north of Mount Donaldson. Named by US-ACAN for Lt. Cdr. Emmert E. Ludeman, USN, officer in charge at the Naval Air Facility, McMurdo Sound, 1958.

== Mouth ==
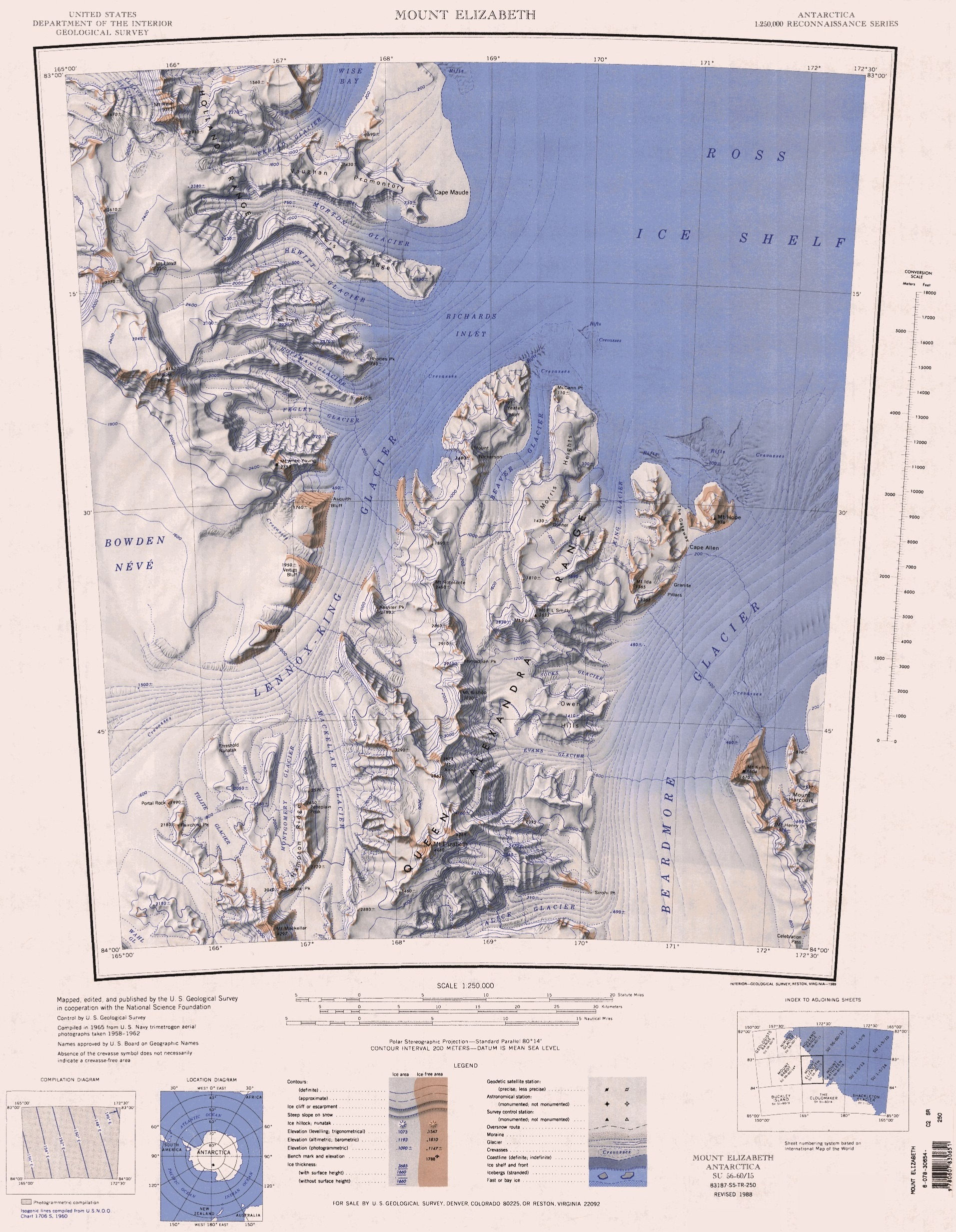
Mouth of the glacier (southeast corner)

=== The Gateway ===
83°31′S 170°58′E. A low snow-filled pass between Cape Allen and Mount Hope at the northeast extremity of Queen Alexandra Range, affording passage from Ross Ice Shelf to the mouth of Beardmore Glacier westward of Mount Hope. Discovered by the Southern Polar Party of the BrAE (1907–09) and so named because the pass was used to enter Beardmore Glacier. Not: The Gap.

=== Cape Allen ===
83°33′S 171°00′E. A bare rock point located 3 nautical miles (5.6 km; 3.5 mi) southwest of Mount Hope, near the mouth of Beardmore Glacier. The point forms the west side of the south approach to The Gateway. Discovered by the BrAE (1907–09) and named for Robert Calder Allen of the Franklin Relief Expedition to the Arctic.

=== Lands End Nunataks ===
83°43′S 172°37′E. Two rock nunataks 2 nautical miles (3.7 km; 2.3 mi) north-north-west of Airdrop Peak at the north end of Ebony Ridge. The nunataks lie at the E side of the terminus of Beardmore Glacier and mark the northern termination of the Commonwealth Range at Ross Ice Shelf. The descriptive name was recommended to US-ACAN by John Gunner of the Ohio State University Institute of Polar Studies, who, with Henry H. Brecher, measured a geological section here on Jan. 16, 1970.

== Sources ==
- Alberts, Fred G., ed. (1995), Geographic Names of the Antarctic (PDF) (2 ed.), United States Board on Geographic Names This article incorporates public domain material from websites or documents of the United States Board on Geographic Names.
- Barrat, John (1 December 2016), "One cold bug: Fossil beetle discovered in Antarctica", Smithsonian Insider, Smithsonian Institution, archived from the original on 11 June 2019
- "Beardmore Glacier", www.britannica.com, Encyclopædia Britannica, Inc.
- Buckley Island, USGS
- Fiennes, Ranulph (2021), Shackleton: a biography, Michael Joseph, p. 201, ISBN 978-0-241-35671-5
- Mount Elizabeth, USGS
- Plunket Point (PDF), USGS
- "Rare Antarctic beetle find delights", BBC News, 29 November 2016, archived from the original on 30 November 2016
- The Cloudmaker, USGS
- This article incorporates public domain material from websites or documents of the United States Geological Survey.
