= Moore Mountains =

Mountain range in Antarctica

- Location within Antarctica

Geography
- Continent: Antarctica
- Range coordinates: 83°21′S 160°45′E
- Parent range: Queen Elizabeth Range

The Moore Mountains (83°21′S 160°45′E) are a small but conspicuous group of mountains just north of New Year Pass in the Queen Elizabeth Range in Antarctica.

== Name ==
The Moore Mountains were observed in 1957 by the New Zealand southern party of the Commonwealth Trans-Antarctic Expedition (CTAE; 1956–58) and named for R.D. Moore, Treasurer of the Ross Sea Committee.

== Location ==
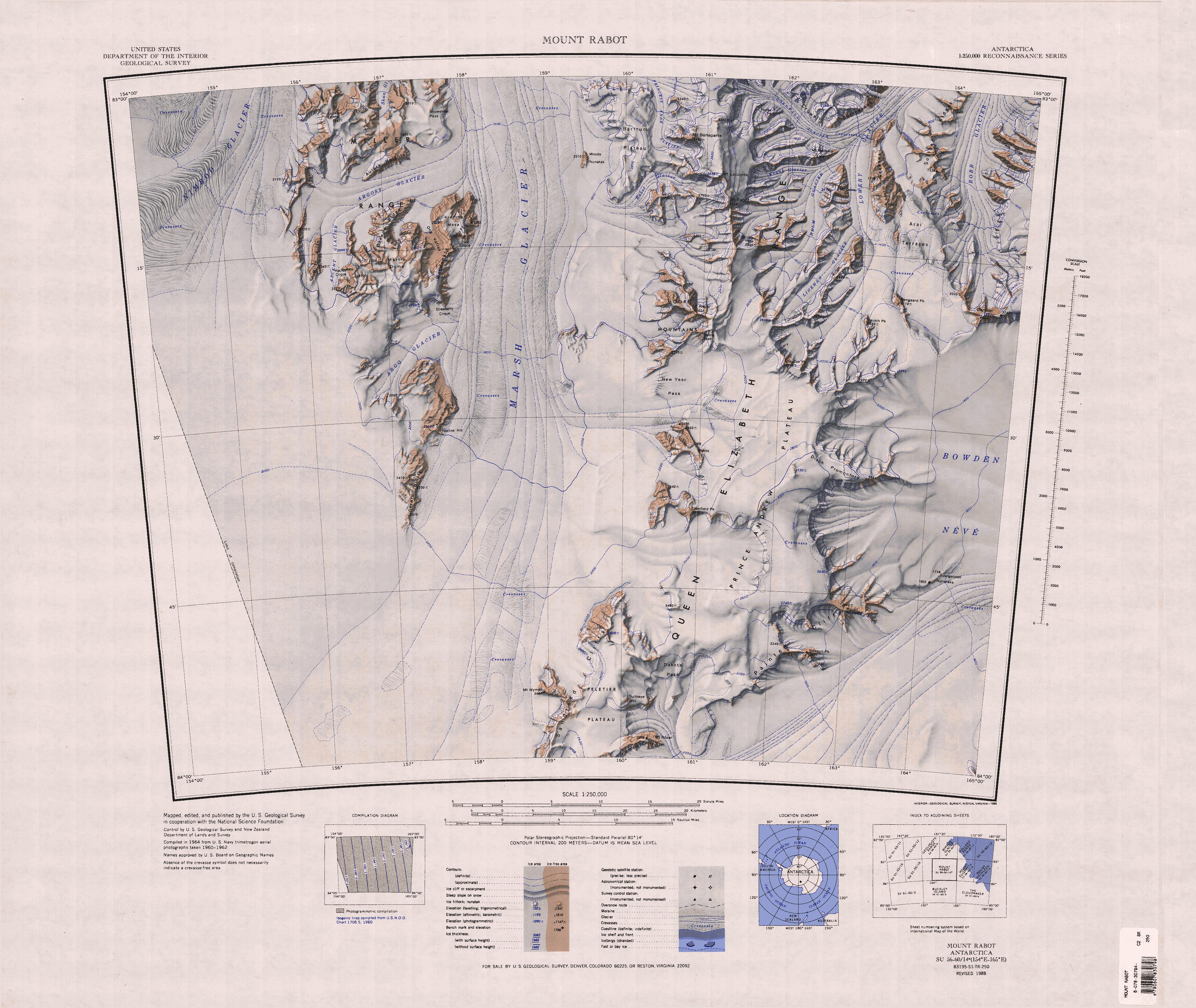
Peletier Plateau in southwest of map

The Moore Mountains are in the west of the Queen Elizabeth Range. The Prince Andrew Plateau is to the southeast, the Marsh Glacier to the west and Mount Rabot to the northeast. Features, or nearby features, include Baillie Peak, Mount Angier and New Year Pass to the south.

== Features ==
=== Baillie Peak ===
83°22′S 161°00′E. A peak over 2,800 metres (9,200 ft) high, located 2 nautical miles (3.7 km; 2.3 mi) south-southeast of Mount Angier in the Moore Mountains. The peak was observed by the Ohio State University Geological Party, 1967-68, which named it for Ralph J. Baillie, field assistant with the party.

=== Mount Angier ===
83°21′S 161°00′E. A prominent peak in the Moore Mountains. Named by the New Zealand Geological Survey Antarctic Expedition (NZGSAE) (1961-62) for Lieutenant Commander Donald L. Angier, United States Navy, pilot of the reconnaissance, landing and pick-up flights in this area.

=== New Year Pass ===
83°28′S 160°40′E. A low snow pass between the Moore Mountains and Mount Weeks. This pass was used on New Year's Day, 1958, by a New Zealand party of the CTAE (1956-58) to get from Marsh Glacier to January Col, Prince Andrew Plateau, overlooking Bowden Névé.

== Sources ==
- Alberts, Fred G., ed. (1995), Geographic Names of the Antarctic (PDF) (2 ed.), United States Board on Geographic Names This article incorporates public domain material from websites or documents of the United States Board on Geographic Names.
- Mount Rabot, USGS: United States Geological Survey
- This article incorporates public domain material from websites or documents of the United States Geological Survey.
