= O'Leary Peak =

O'Leary Peak may refer to:

- O'Leary Peak (U.S.)
- O'Leary Peak (Antarctica)
