= The Cloudmaker =

Mountain in the Queen Alexandra Range, Antarctica

- Location within Antarctica

Highest point
- Coordinates: 84°17′S 169°25′E

Geography
- Location: Antarctica
- Parent range: Queen Alexandra Range

The Cloudmaker (84°17′S 169°25′E) is a massive mountain, 2,680 metres (8,790 ft) high, standing at the west side of Beardmore Glacier, just south of Hewson Glacier in the Queen Alexandra Range, Antarctica. It is easily identifiable by its high, ice-free slope facing Beardmore Glacier.

== Exploration and name ==
The Cloudmaker was discovered by the British Antarctic Expedition, 1907–09, and so named because of a cloud which usually appeared near the summit, providing a useful landmark during their journey up the Beardmore Glacier.

== Location ==
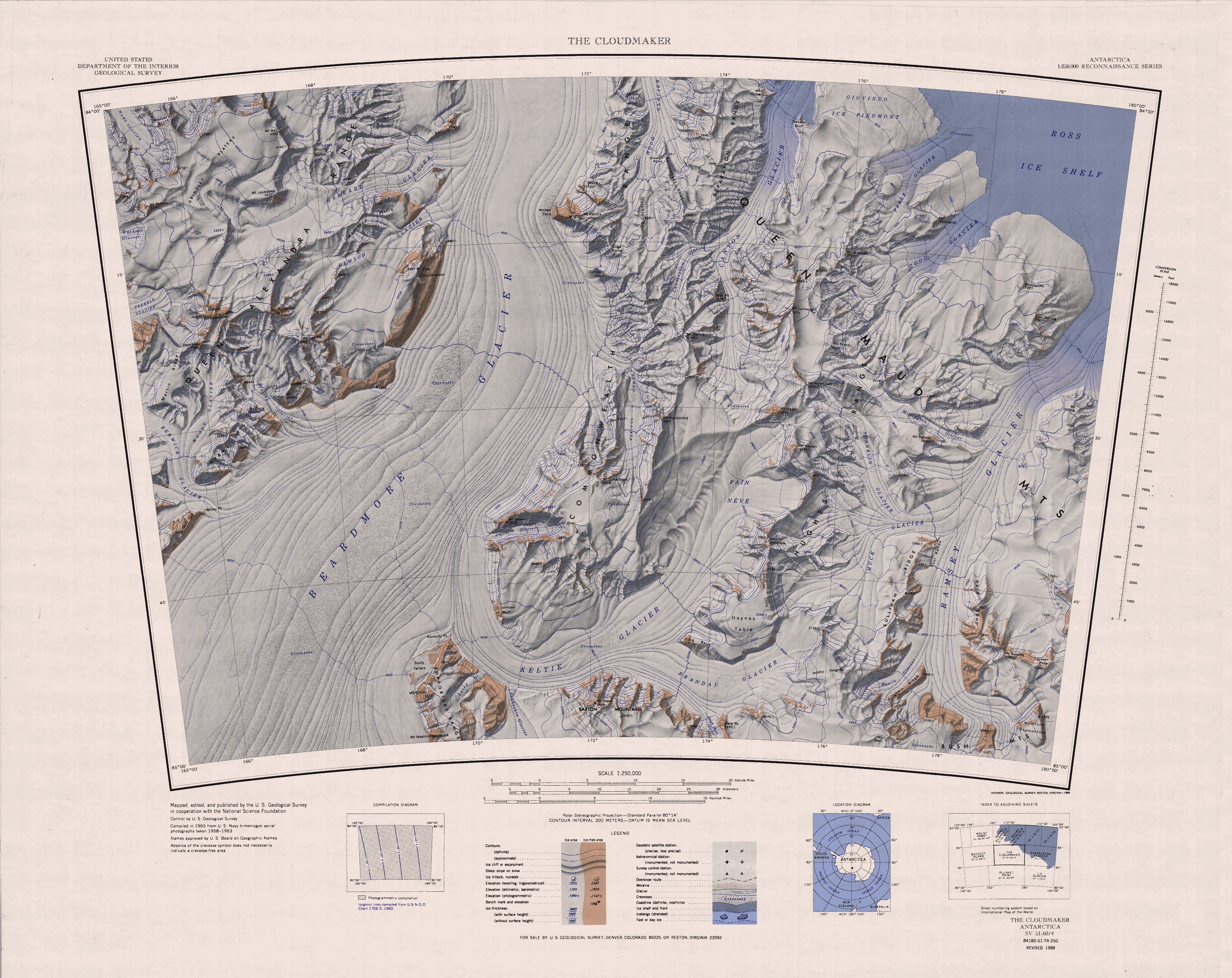
The Cloudmaker towards northwest of map

The Cloudmaker lies on the west margin of Beardmore Glacier, to the north of Cherry Icefall and south of Hewson Glacier. It is northeast of Mount Dickerson and southeast of Grindley Plateau. Morrison Hills extend along the northern side of Hewson Glacier, and Bell Bluff is further north.

== Nearby features ==
=== Morrison Hills ===
84°12′S 168°40′E. A series of rugged E-W trending hills between Garrard Glacier and Hewson Glacier. Named by the United States Advisory Committee on Antarctic Names (US-ACAN) after Lieutenant I. James Morrison, United States Navy, who did preliminary work leading to the induction of C-130 aircraft into Antarctica in February 1960, and who also participated in United States Navy Operation Deep Freeze for several seasons 1958-59.

=== Bell Bluff ===
84°04′S 170°00′E. A rock bluff on the west side of Beardmore Glacier, just north of the mouth of Garrard Glacier. Named by US-ACAN for Charles A. Bell, Utilities Man, who wintered at Hallett Station, 1964.

== Sources ==
- Alberts, Fred G., ed. (1995), Geographic Names of the Antarctic (PDF) (2 ed.), United States Board on Geographic Names This article incorporates public domain material from websites or documents of the United States Board on Geographic Names.
- The Cloudmaker, USGS: United States Geological Survey
- This article incorporates public domain material from websites or documents of the United States Geological Survey.
