= Semisopochnoi Island =

American Island

Semisopochnoi
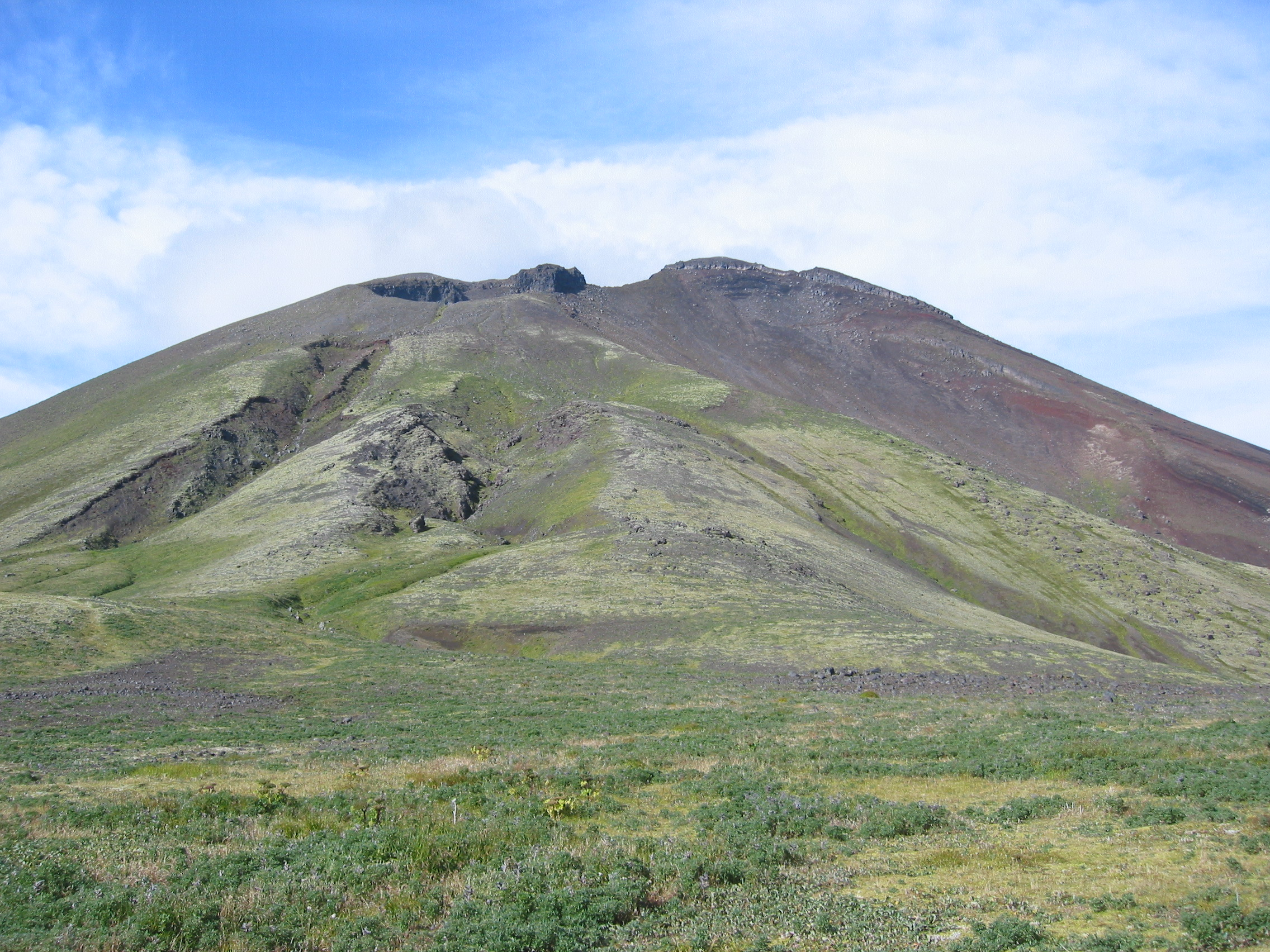
- Eastern cone of Mount Young in the Semisopochnoi Caldera.

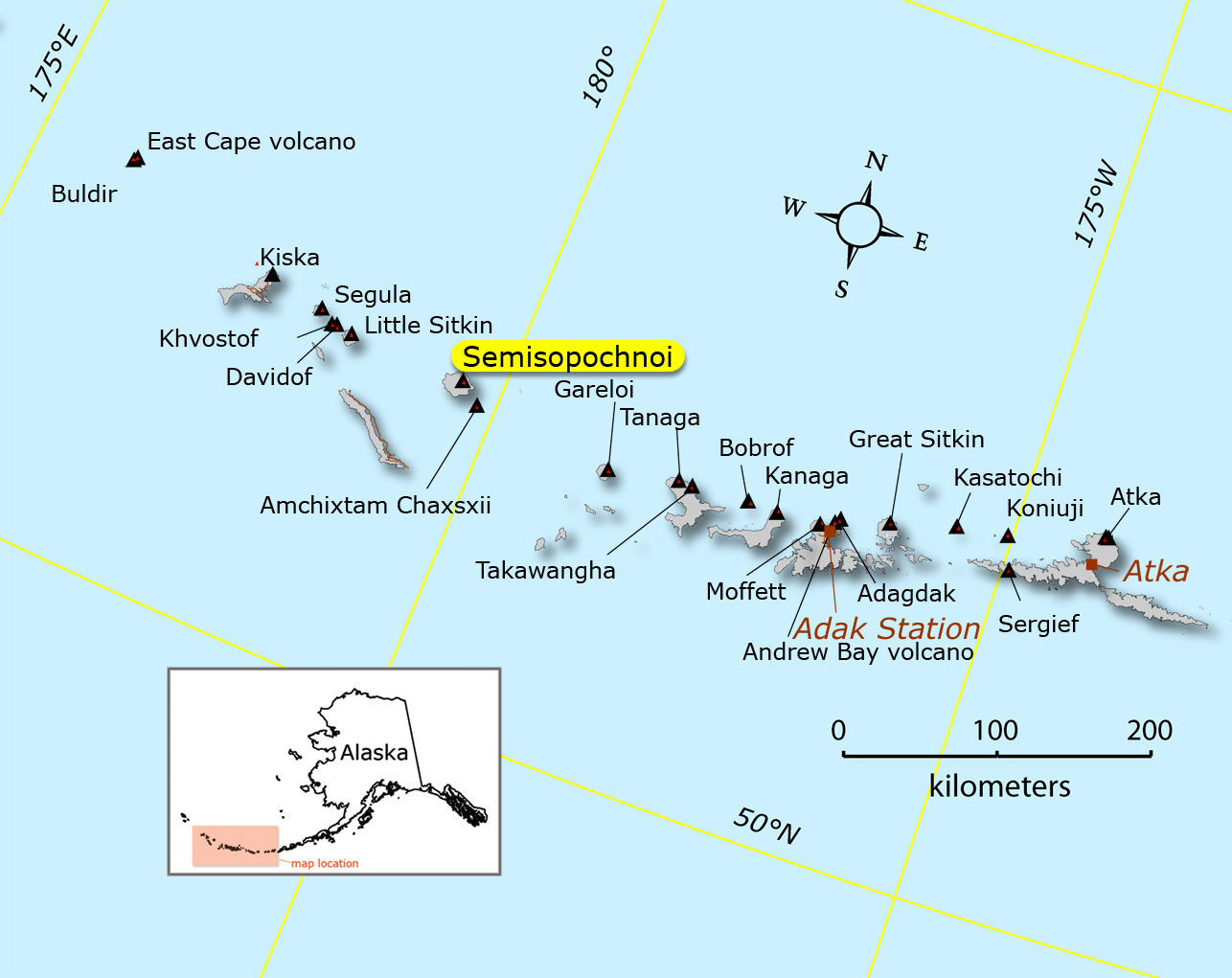
- Top: Location of Semisopochnoi in the Aleutians. Amchixtam Chaxsxii, just southeast of Semisopochnoi, is an underwater volcano. Bottom: Location of Semisopochnoi in Alaska

- Location on a map of Alaska

Geography
- Location: Bering Sea
- Coordinates: 51°57′05″N 179°36′03″E
- Archipelago: Rat Islands
- Area: 221.59 km^{2} (85.56 sq mi)
- Length: 18 km (11.2 mi)
- Width: 20 km (12 mi)
- Highest elevation: 1,221 m (4006 ft)

Administration
- United States
- State: Alaska

Semisopochnoi Island or Unyak Island (obsolete Russian: Семисопочной, modern Russian: Семисопочный Semisopochny – "having seven hills"; Aleut: Unyax̂) is part of the Rat Islands group in the western Aleutian Islands of Alaska. The island is uninhabited and provides an important nesting area for maritime birds. The island is of volcanic origin, containing several volcanoes including Mount Young. It has a land area of 85.558 square miles (221.59 square km), measuring 11 miles (18 km) in length and 12 miles (20 km) in width.

At 179°46' East (+179.7667) (in the Eastern Hemisphere), the easternmost tip of Semisopochnoi is, by longitude, the easternmost land location in the United States and North America. Semisopochnoi is located 14 minutes (0.2333 degrees) or 9.7 miles (15.6 km) west of the 180th meridian.

== Wildlife ==
Semisopochnoi has no known native land mammals. Arctic foxes were introduced to the island during the 19th century for fur farming and removed in 1997. Most ground-nesting bird species (Aleutian cackling goose, rock ptarmigan) and most burrow-nesting seabirds (storm-petrels, ancient murrelets, Cassin's auklets, tufted puffins) were extirpated by foxes; Semisopochnoi Island is currently in the early stages of recovery. The island has remained free of Norway rats.

The large least and crested auklet colony near Sugarloaf Head is one of the largest among the nine auklet colonies in the Aleutian Islands. Crested auklets and least auklets breed in one colony, located on the south facing slopes of Sugarloaf Peak volcano and its associated cinder cones near Sugarloaf Head. Semisopochnoi Island also supports a significant population of red-faced cormorants.

In total, Semisopochnoi supports well over a million seabirds, most of which are least auklets or crested auklets.

== Geology ==
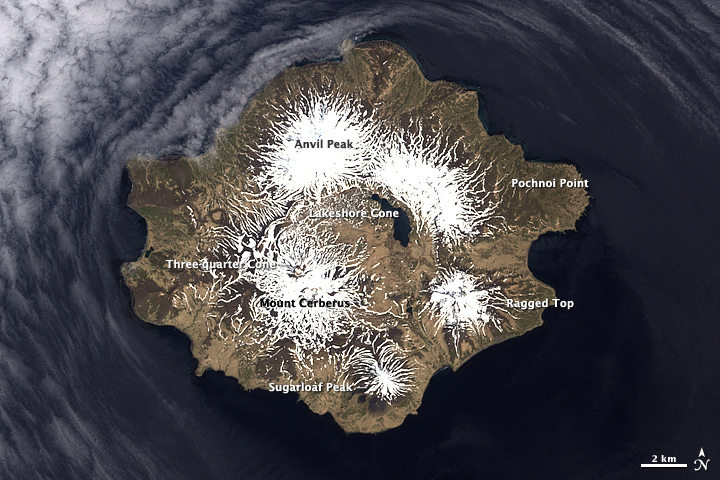
Satellite photo showing the Seven Mountains of Semisopochnoi

Semisopochnoi, the largest subaerial volcano of the western Aleutians, is 20 km wide at sea level and contains a caldera 8 km wide that formed as a result of the collapse of a low-angle, dominantly basaltic volcano following the eruption of a large volume of dacitic pumice. The high point of the island is 1,221 meter Anvil Peak, a double-peaked cone that forms much of the island's northern part. The three-peaked, 774-meter high Mount Young (formerly named Mount Cerberus) is a volcano within the caldera. Each of the peaks contains a summit crater; lava flows on the northern flank of Mt. Young appear more recent than those on the southern side. Other post-caldera volcanoes include the symmetrical 855 m high Sugarloaf Peak south-southeast of the caldera and Lakeshore Cone, a small cinder cone at the edge of Fenner Lake in the northeast part of the caldera. Most documented historical eruptions have originated from Mt. Young, although Coats (1950) considered that both Sugarloaf and Lakeshore Cone within the caldera could have been active during historical time.

Semisopochnoi's last known volcanic eruption took place from February 2021 to May 2023. A historic eruption of Semisopochnoi was reported in 1873, and at least four others may have occurred in the previous hundred years, but documentation is scant. These eruptions apparently emanated from the flanks of Mount Young; the most recent flow appears to be less than a century old.

== Easternmost North America location debate ==
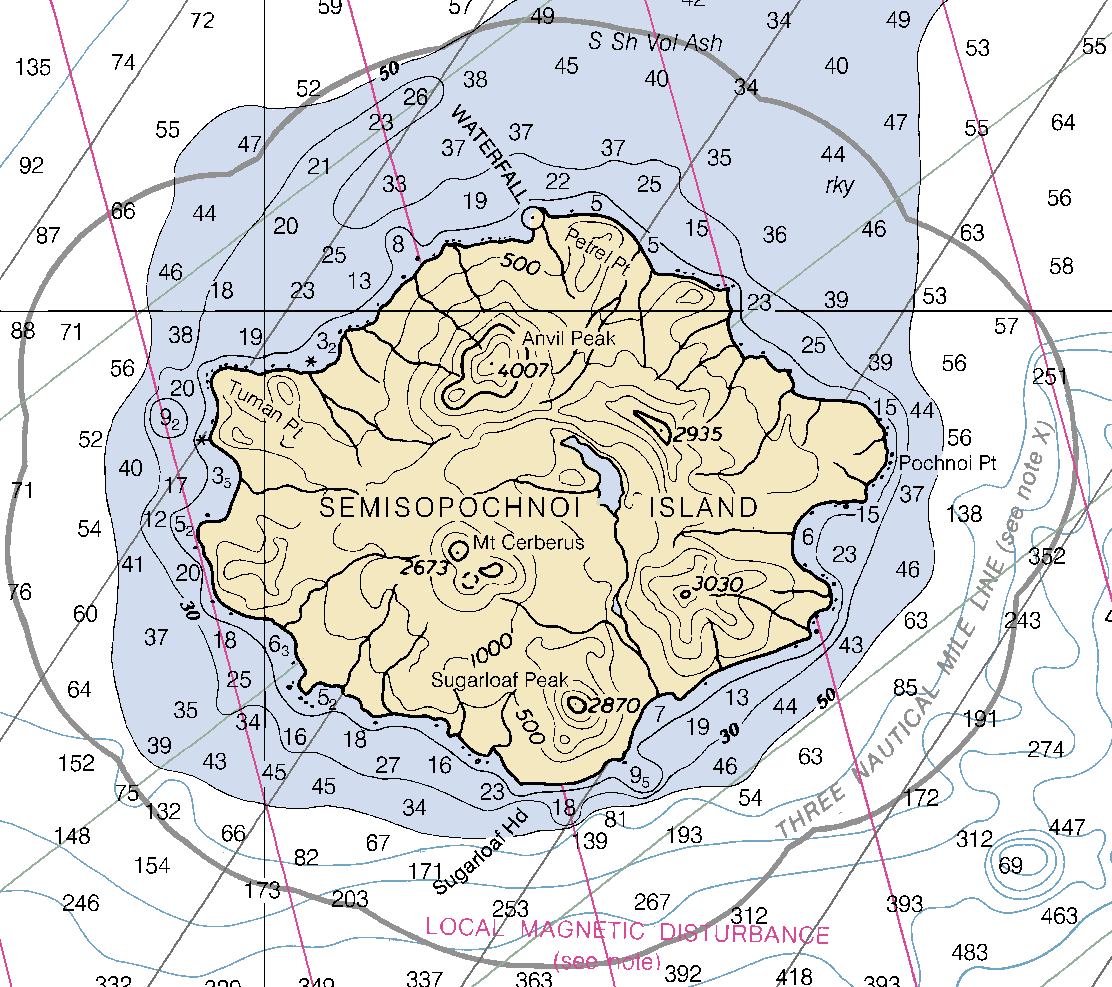
Semisopochnoi nautical chart

Semisopochnoi's position in the Aleutian Island Chain gives it the distinction of being the Aleutian island most immediately West of the 180th meridian, giving it longitudinal coordinates in the Eastern Hemisphere. Therefore, some have argued it is technically the easternmost location in North America. This is a counterintuitive argument considering its location near the extreme western boundary of the United States and depends on a series of assumptions about the definition of boundaries between hemispheres, boundaries between continents, as well as whether island locations should even be considered part of a continent.

The other contenders for the title of easternmost North American location are Nordost Rundingen, Greenland at 12°08' West (-12.1333) and Cape Spear, Newfoundland, Canada at 52°37' West (-52.6167) —which, along with Semisopochnoi, are all island locations. Cape St. Charles at 55° 37' West (-55.6167) on the Labrador Peninsula is the easternmost point of mainland North America. Cape Spear is the easternmost location relative to the geographic center of North America if Greenland is excluded because it is not politically part of North America. For this and other reasons, Cape Spear is traditionally considered to be the easternmost location in North America.

== Renaming of Mount Cerberus ==
On December 12, 2022, a Congressional bill authored by Senator Lisa Murkowski was passed by the 117th Congress renaming Mount Cerberus "Mount Young" in honor of long-serving Alaska U.S. Representative Don Young, who died on March 18, 2022.
