= Carl R. Disch =

American scientist

- Born: Carl Robert Disch; Monroe, Wisconsin, U.S.
- Disappeared: May 8, 1965 near Byrd Station, Antarctica
- Occupation: Ionospheric physicist
- Known for: Mysterious disappearance

Carl Robert Disch (presumed dead on May 14, 1965) was an ionospheric physicist for the National Bureau of Standards who went missing near Byrd Station, Antarctica, on May 8, 1965.

== Disappearance ==
Disch was stationed at the radio noise building of Byrd Station to work on his ionospheric studies. On the morning of May 8, 1965, he left the radio noise building to return to the main station complex located 2.1 km away. When Disch had not arrived at the main station within a reasonable time, a rescue party departed the station to search for him. His trail was spotted but the search party had to go back to the station for refueling. Upon their return, the trail had been covered by drifting snow and was never rediscovered. Despite exhaustive searches and measures taken to make the station more visible, including firing of flares and illuminating extra floodlights, Disch was never found.

While he was missing, temperatures dropped to −79 °F (−62 °C). The search was called off on May 14. He is presumed dead and his body has never been recovered. Memorial services were held in his hometown of Monroe, Wisconsin. He was 26 years old.

== Conspiracy ==
The disappearance of Disch has spawned many conspiracy theories. They are given legitimacy by an alleged message transmitted to McMurdo Station in 1971. The author of the message, claiming to be Disch, stated that he was alive. The message has been disregarded as a hoax.

== Legacy ==
The Disch Promontory is named in his honor.

== See also ==
- List of people who disappeared
