= Mount Mackellar =

Mountain in Ross Dependency, Antarctica

- Location within Antarctica

Highest point
- Coordinates: 83°59′S 166°39′E

Geography
- Continent: Antarctica

Mount Mackellar (83°59′S 166°39′E) is a massive mountain, 4,295 metres (14,091 ft) high, standing at the head of Mackellar Glacier, 3 nautical miles (5.6 km; 3.5 mi) south of Pagoda Peak in the Queen Alexandra Range, Antarctica.

== Discovery and name ==
Mount Mackellar was discovered by the British Antarctic Expedition, 1907–09, and named after Campbell Mackellar, a supporter of the expedition.

== Location ==
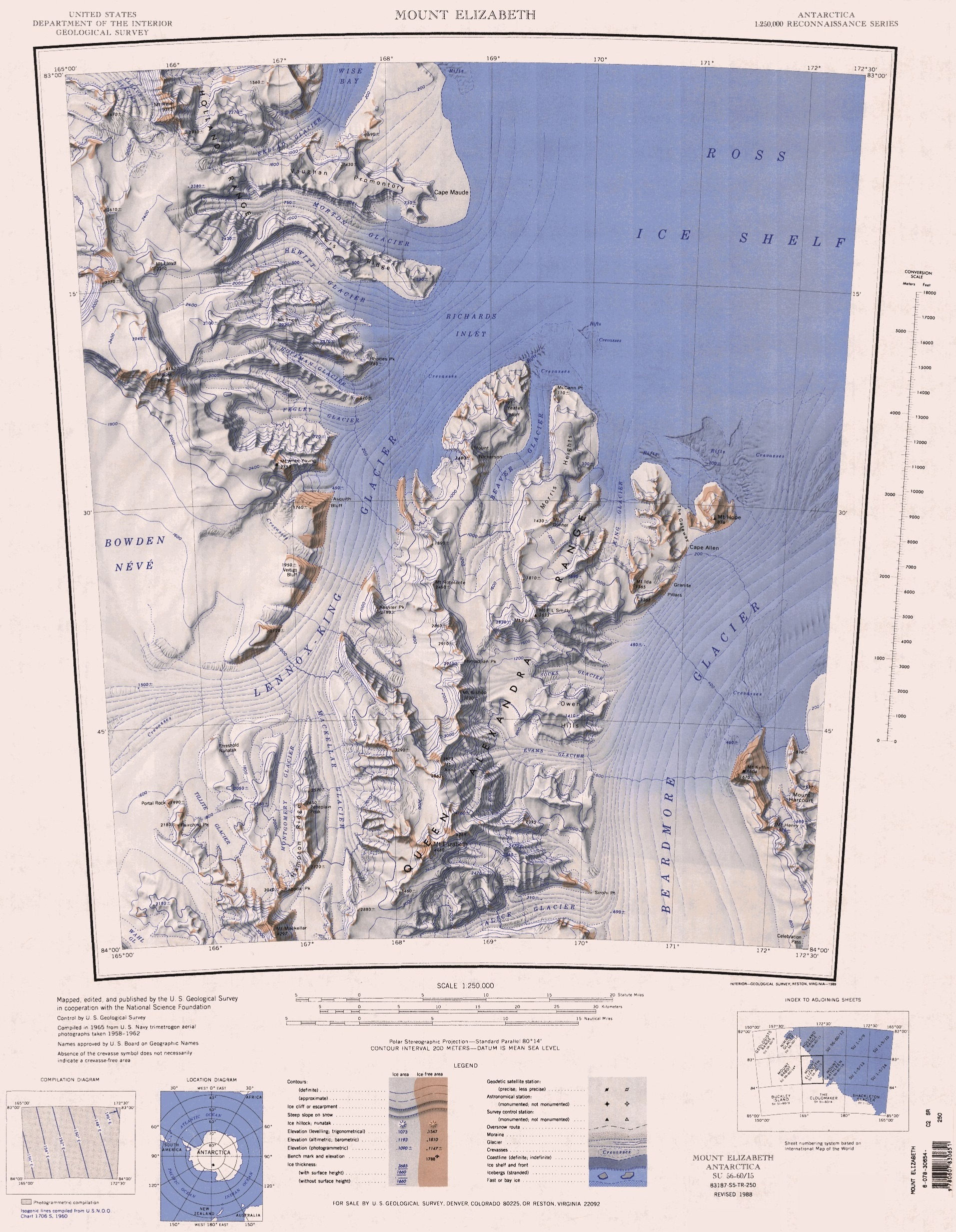
Morris Heights in center of map

Mount Mackellar rises above the north of Grindley Plateau in the central Queen Alexandra Range. Mount Elizabeth is to the east. Mount Mackellar is at the head of Mackellar Glacier to the northwest. A line of peaks extends to the northwest along the west side of Tillite Glacier, ending in Fairchild Peak and Portal Rock. A ridge connects the mountain to Pagoda Peak to the north, from which Hampton Ridge extends between Montgomerie Glacier and Mackellar Glacier to Peneplain Peak.

== Features ==
Nearby features include:

=== Fairchild Peak ===
83°52′S 165°41′E. A conspicuous rock peak, 2,180 metres (7,150 ft) high, standing 1.6 nautical miles (3.0 km; 1.8 mi) south-southeast of Portal Rock, at the south side of the mouth of Tillite Glacier. Named by the United States Advisory Committee on Antarctic Names (US-ACAN) for William W. Fairchild, United States ArmyRP cosmic rays scientist at McMurdo Sound, 1961.

=== Portal Rock ===
83°50′S 165°36′E. A turret-like rock knob 1,990 metres (6,530 ft) high standing 1.5 nautical miles (2.8 km; 1.7 mi) northwest of Fairchild Peak, just south of the mouth of Tillite Glacier. So named by the Ohio State University geology party (1966-67) because the only safe route to Tillite Glacier lies between this rock and Fairchild Peak.

=== Threshold Nunatak ===
83°46′S 166°06′E. An isolated nunatak located at the mouth of Tillite Glacier, 5 nautical miles (9.3 km; 5.8 mi) northeast of Portal Rock. The name was suggested by John Gunner of the Ohio State University Geological Expedition, 1969-70, who was landed by helicopter to collect a rock sample here. The name is in association with Portal Rock and also reflects the location at the mouth of Tillite Glacier.

=== Pagoda Peak ===
83°56′S 166°45′E. A sharp peak, 3,040 metres (9,970 ft) high, between the heads of Tillite Glacier and Montgomerie Glacier, 3 nautical miles (5.6 km; 3.5 mi) north of Mount Mackellar. So named by the New Zealand Geological Survey Antarctic Expedition (NZGSAE) (1961-62) because of its shape.

=== Hampton Ridge ===
83°52′S 167°02′E. A ridge about 10 nautical miles (19 km; 12 mi) long running north from Pagoda Peak between Montgomerie and Mackellar Glaciers. Named by US-ACAN for Major William C. Hampton, commanding officer of the United States Army Aviation Detachment which supported the Texas Tech-Shackleton Glacier Expedition, 1964-65.

=== Peneplain Peak ===
83°51′S 167°02′E. A peak 2,650 metres (8,690 ft) high located midway along Hampton Ridge, which lies between Montgomerie Glacier and Mackellar Glacier. So named by the Ohio State University Geological Party, 1967–68, because an excellent exposure of.the Kukri Peneplain, an ancient erosion surface, is present on the peak.

== Sources ==
- Alberts, Fred G., ed. (1995), Geographic Names of the Antarctic (PDF) (2 ed.), United States Board on Geographic Names This article incorporates public domain material from websites or documents of the United States Board on Geographic Names.
- Mount Elizabeth, USGS: United States Geological Survey
- This article incorporates public domain material from websites or documents of the United States Geological Survey.
