= Colbert Hills (Antarctica) =

Hills and bluffs in Antarctica

- Location within Antarctica

Geography
- Continent: Antarctica
- Range coordinates: 84°12′S 162°35′E

The Colbert Hills (84°12′S 162°35′E) are a line of hills and bluffs, including Coalsack Bluff, lying east of Lewis Cliffs, between Law Glacier and Walcott Névé in Antarctica. The hills trend southwest for 16 nautical miles (30 km; 18 mi) from Mount Sirius.

== Exploration and name ==
The Colbert Hills are named for Edwin H. Colbert, curator of vertebrate paleontology at the American Museum of Natural History, leader of the paleontology team with the Ohio State University Geological Expedition, 1969–70, which discovered Lystrosaurus fossils in these hills. The discovery is one of the truly significant fossil finds, with great implications on calculations concerning Gondwanaland.

== Location ==
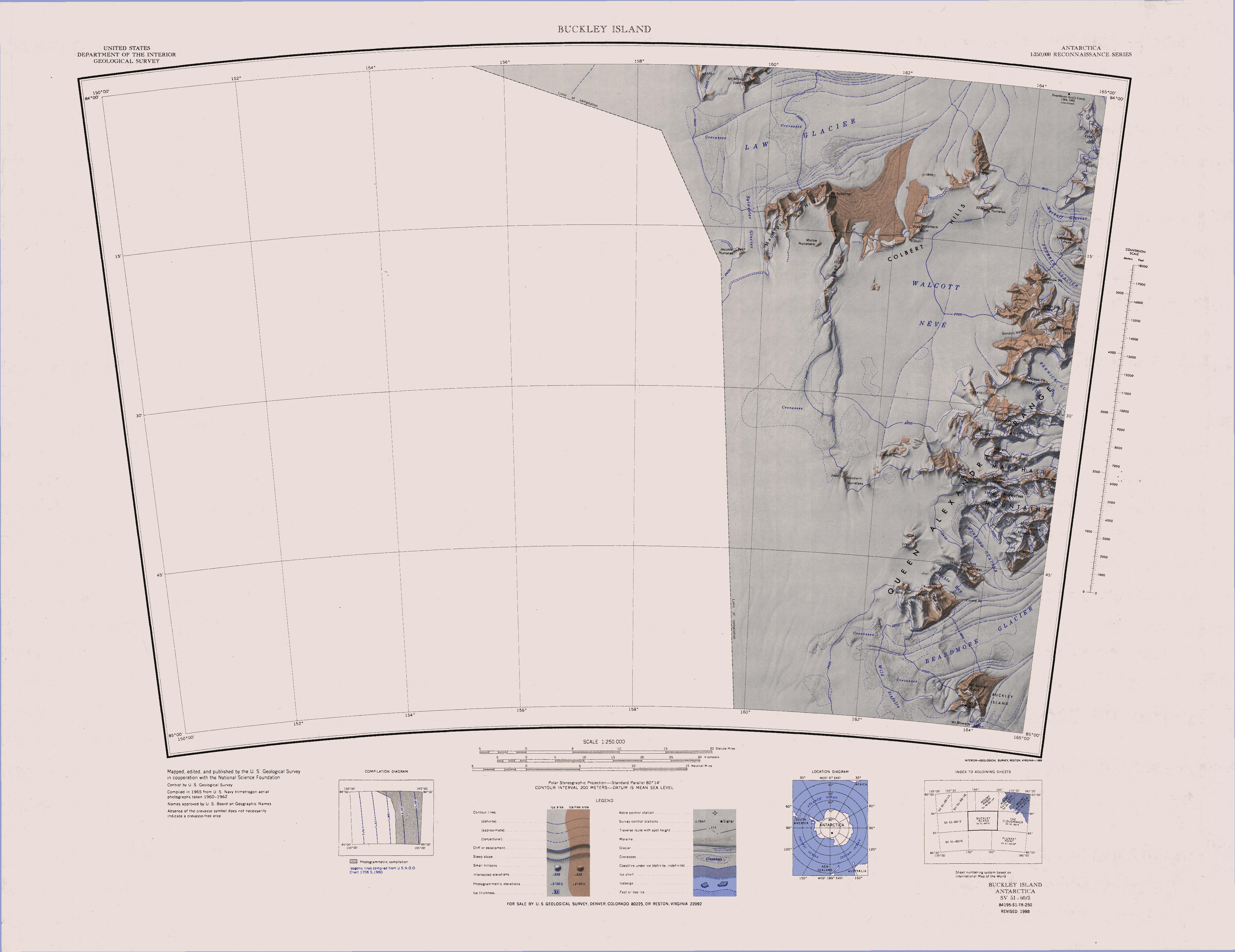
Colbert Hills in northwest of map

The Colbert Hills are to the east of the Antarctic Plateau and south of Law Glacier, which separates them from the Queen Elizabeth Range. The Walcott Névé is to the south, and the Queen Alexandra Range to the east. Features include Coalsack Bluff, Bauhs Nunatak and Mount Sirius. Nearby features to the west include Jacobs Nunatak, Morse Nunataks, MacAlpine Hills and Mount Achernar.

== Features ==
=== Coalsack Bluff ===
84°14′S 162°25′E. A small rock bluff standing at the northern limits of Walcott Neve, 6 nautical miles (11 km; 6.9 mi) west-southwest of Bauhs Nunatak. So named by the New Zealand Geological Survey Antarctic Expedition (NZGSAE) (1961–62) because of the coal seams found running through the bluff.

=== Bauhs Nunatak ===
84°12′S 163°24′E. A prominent nunatak, 2,225 metres (7,300 ft) high, at the north side of Walcott Névé, about 3.5 nautical miles (6.5 km; 4.0 mi) south-southeast of Mount Sirius. Named by the United States Advisory Committee on Antarctic Names (US-ACAN) for Luvern R. Bauhs, United States ArmyRP ionospheric scientist at South Pole Station, 1959.

=== Mount Sirius ===
84°08′S 163°15′E. A peak, 2,300 metres (7,500 ft) high, surmounting a prominent, wedge-shaped, ice-free spur between Walcott Névé and Bowden Névé, 3.5 nautical miles (6.5 km; 4.0 mi) north of Bauhs Nunatak. Named by the NZGSAE (1961–62) for the star Sirius which was used in fixing the baseline in the area.

== Nearby features ==
=== Jacobs Nunatak ===
84°17′S 159°38′E. A nunatak on the west side of Mac Alpine Hills, just west of the head of Sylwester Glacier. Named by US-ACAN for Willis S. Jacobs, USARP geomagnetist and seismologist at South Pole Station, 1959.

=== Morse Nunataks ===
84°16′S 160°50′E. Isolated rock nunataks standing 4.5 nautical miles (8.3 km; 5.2 mi) south of Mount Achernar, between Lewis Cliff and MacAlpine Hills. Named by US-ACAN for Oliver C. Morse III, USARP ionospheric scientist at South Pole Station, 1960.

=== MacAlpine Hills ===
84°13′S 160°30′E. A chain of mainly ice-free, bluff-type hills extending from Mount Achernar southwest along the south side of Law Glacier, to Sylwester Glacier. Named by US-ACAN for Ens. Kenneth D. MacAlpine, United States Navy Reserve. A member of United States Navy Squadron VX-6, MacAlpine was injured in an airplane crash at McMurdo Sound, October 1956.

=== Mount Achernar ===
84°12′S 160°56′E. A peak forming the northeast end of Mac Alpine Hills, on the south side of Law Glacier. Named by the NZGSAE (1961–62) after the star Achemar used in fixing the survey baseline.

=== Lewis Cliff ===
84°17′S 161°05′E. An irregular cliff, about 12 nautical miles (22 km; 14 mi) long, extending south from Mount Achernar along the west side of Walcott Névé. Named by US-ACAN for Richard E. Lewis, Aviation Electronics Technician, United States Navy, who was injured during United States Navy Operation Deep Freeze II, 1956–57.

== Sources ==
- Alberts, Fred G., ed. (1995), Geographic Names of the Antarctic (PDF) (2 ed.), United States Board on Geographic Names This article incorporates public domain material from websites or documents of the United States Board on Geographic Names.
- Buckley Island, USGS: United States Geological Survey
- This article incorporates public domain material from websites or documents of the United States Geological Survey.
