= George Grindley =

New Zealand geologist (1925–2019)

- Born: George William Grindley; 22 October 1925; Dunedin, New Zealand
- Died: 12 February 2019 (aged 93); Lower Hutt, New Zealand
- Education: University of Otago
- Scientific career
- Fields: Geology
- Workplaces: New Zealand Geological Survey

George William Grindley (22 October 1925 – 12 February 2019) was a New Zealand geologist. The Grindley Plateau in Antarctica is named in his honour.

== Early life and education ==
Grindley was born in Dunedin on 22 October 1925, and studied geology at the Otago School of Mines at the University of Otago. He graduated Bachelor of Science in 1947, and Master of Science in 1949. The title of his master's thesis was The reconnaissance geology of the Eglinton and East branch valleys, Western Southland. In 1973, he was awarded a DSc by the University of Otago, on the basis of published and unpublished papers submitted as a thesis.

== Career ==
Grindley worked at the New Zealand Geological Survey. He spent time on the West Coast, where he assisted Harold Wellman, and also worked on the displacement of the Alpine Fault. After working in south Wales and Canada for a year in the early 1950s, Grindley worked on the geological mapping of New Zealand, and was site geologist at Wairakei. He also worked on geothermal power projects overseas, including in Mexico and the Philippines. He was also involved in geothermal monitoring of Mount Ruapehu and the monitoring of rifting in the Taupō Volcanic Zone.

Grindley was a member of geological survey teams in Antarctica in 1961–62, 1977–78, and 1981–82, involved in paleomagnetic surveys and geological mapping. He was the senior geologist of the northern party of the New Zealand Geological Survey Antarctic Expedition in 1961–62, which named the Grindley Plateau in the Queen Alexandra Range in his honour.

Grindley retired in 1987.

== Honours ==
In 1968, Grindley was elected a Fellow of the Royal Society of New Zealand.

== Death ==
Grindley died at his home in Lower Hutt on 12 February 2019, aged 93 years.
