= Willey Point =

Willey Point (84°37′S 165°45′E) is a conspicuous rock point along the west side of Beardmore Glacier, marking the south side of the mouth of Berwick Glacier. Named by Advisory Committee on Antarctic Names (US-ACAN) for Francis J. Willey III, United States Antarctic Research Program (USARP) meteorologist at Hallett Station, 1963.
