= O'Leary Peak (Antarctica) =

Partly snow-covered peak in Antarctica

O'Leary Peak (84°27′S 179°14′W) is a partly snow-covered peak (1,040 m), the northernmost summit along the east wall of Erickson Glacier, where the latter enters the Ross Ice Shelf, Antarctica. The topographical feature was first discovered and photographed by the United States Antarctic Service (USAS), 1939–41. Named by Advisory Committee on Antarctic Names (US-ACAN) for Paul V. O'Leary, builder, U.S. Navy Reserve, a member of the U.S. Naval Support Force, Antarctica, who lost his life by accidental poisoning on November 28, 1959. The peak lies situated on the Dufek Coast, a portion of the Ross Dependency lying between the Shackleton Coast and the Amundsen Coast.
