= Mount Young (Alaska) =

Alaskan volcano

Coordinates: 51°55′47″N 179°35′53″E

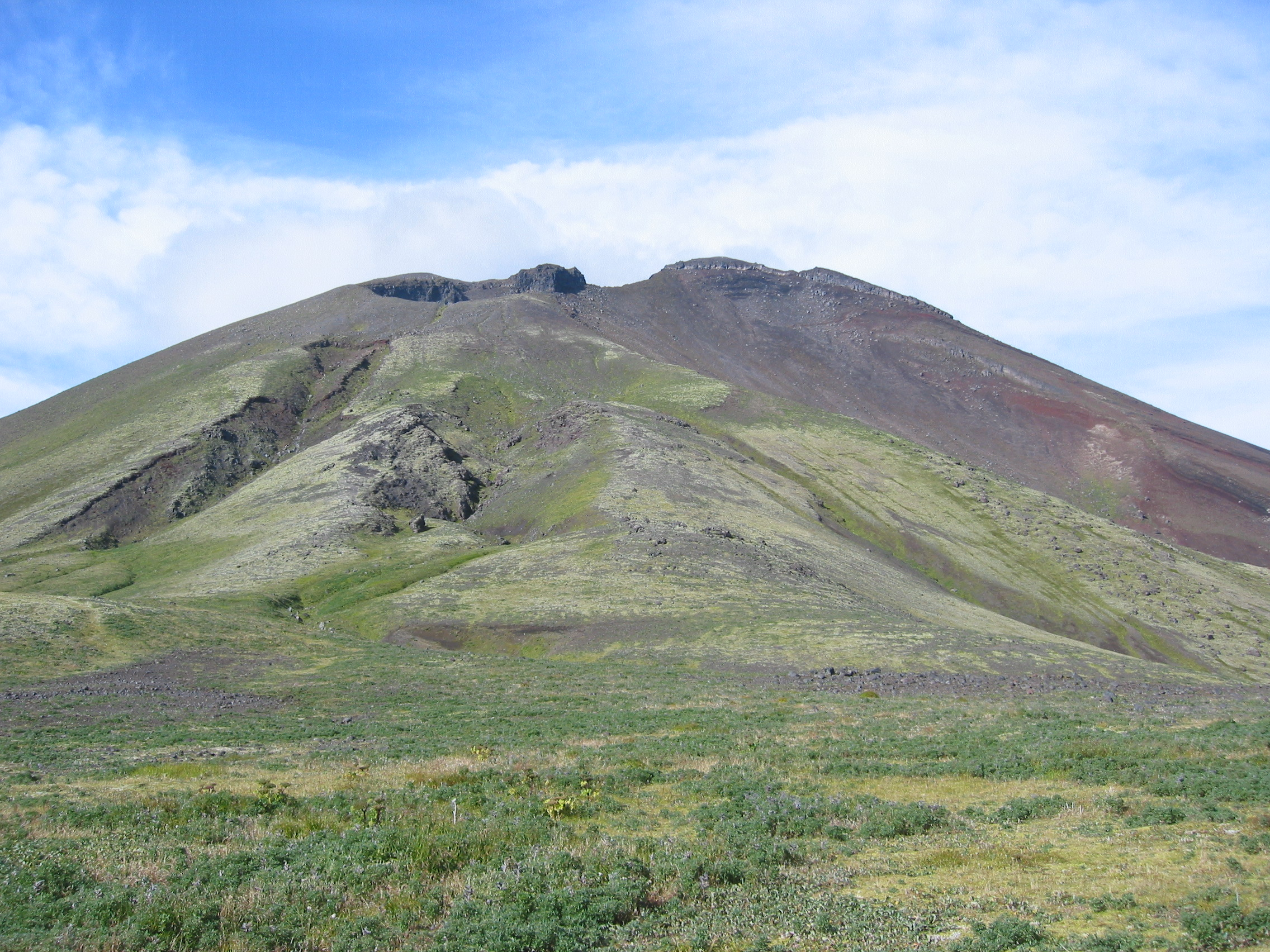
Eastern cone of Mount Young in the Semisopochnoi Caldera

Mount Young (formerly Mount Cerberus) is an Alaskan volcano on Semisopochnoi Island named after former U.S. Congressman Don Young. A bill was signed into law by U.S. President Joe Biden in December 2022 to rename the volcano and commemorate the legacy of Young.
