= Ramsey Glacier =

Glacier in Antarctica

- Location within Antarctica
- Coordinates: 84°24′S 179°20′E
- Terminus: Ross Ice Shelf

Ramsey Glacier (84°24′S 179°20′E) is a glacier about 45 nautical miles (83 km; 52 mi) long in Antarctica. It originates in the Bush Mountains near the edge of the polar plateau and flows north through the Queen Maud Mountains of Antarctica to the Ross Ice Shelf eastward of Den Hartog Peak.

== Early exploration ==
The Ramsey Glacier was discovered by the United States Antarctic Service (USAS) during Flight C of February 29 – March 1, 1940. It was named by the Advisory Committee on Antarctic Names (US-ACAN), on the recommendation of Rear Admiral Richard E. Byrd, for Admiral DeWitt Clinton Ramsey, United States Navy, Vice Chief of Naval Operations during Operation Highjump, 1946–47.

== Course ==
The Ramsey Glacier originates in the Bush Mountains below McIntyre Promontory. It flows northwest, then north past Fulgham Ridge, where it is joined from the left (west) by Bowin Glacier. It continues north between Reid Spur to the east and Sullivan Ridge to the west. Muck Glacier joins from the west after Sullivan Ridge. Muck Glacier is fed from the northwest by Shanklin Glacier. Ramsey Glacier continues north through the Queen Maud Mountains, and receives Millington Glacier from the west before entering the Ross Ice Shelf. It is joined from the right (east) by Erickson Glacier at its mouth.

== Tributaries ==
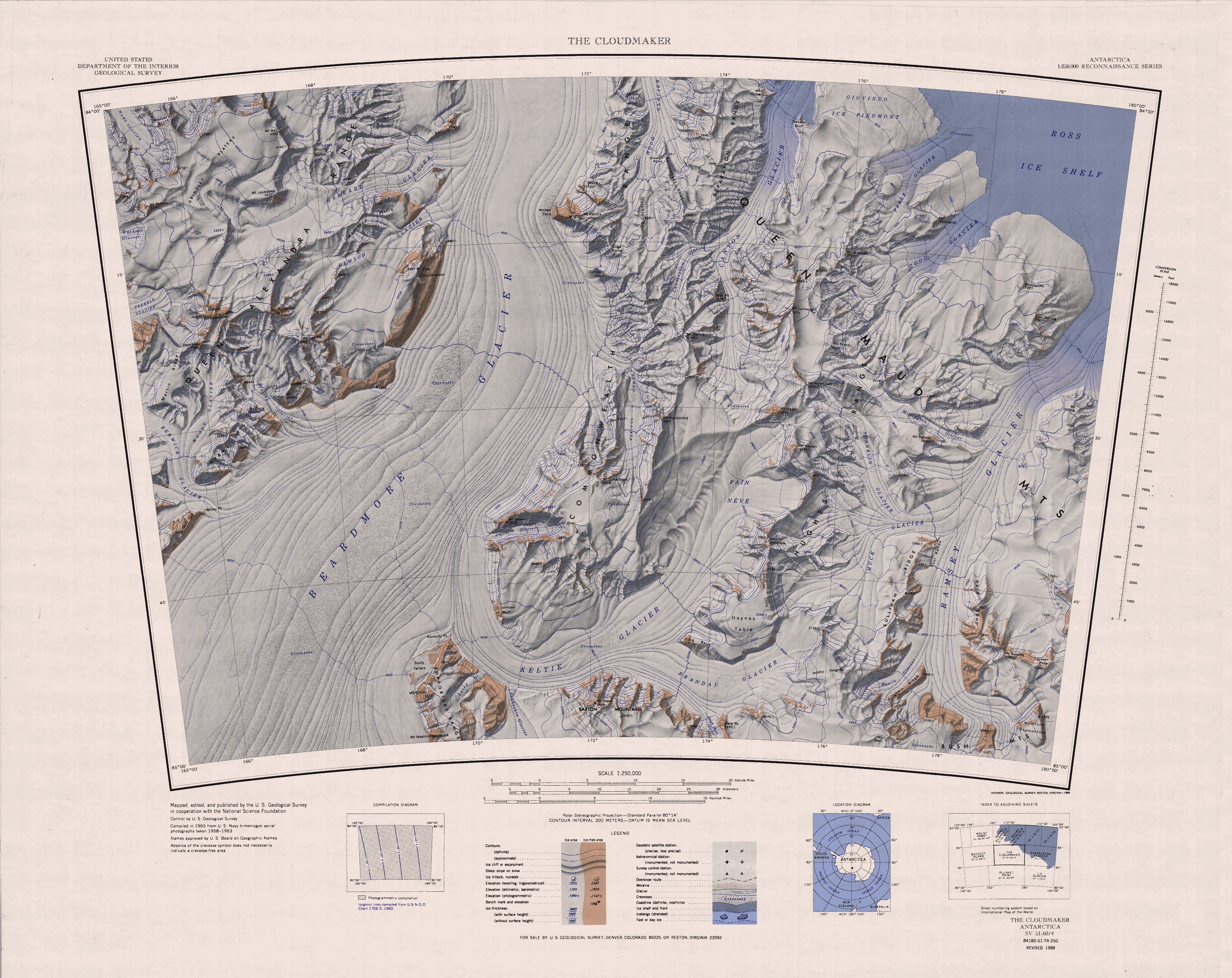
Ramsey Glacier to the east of the map

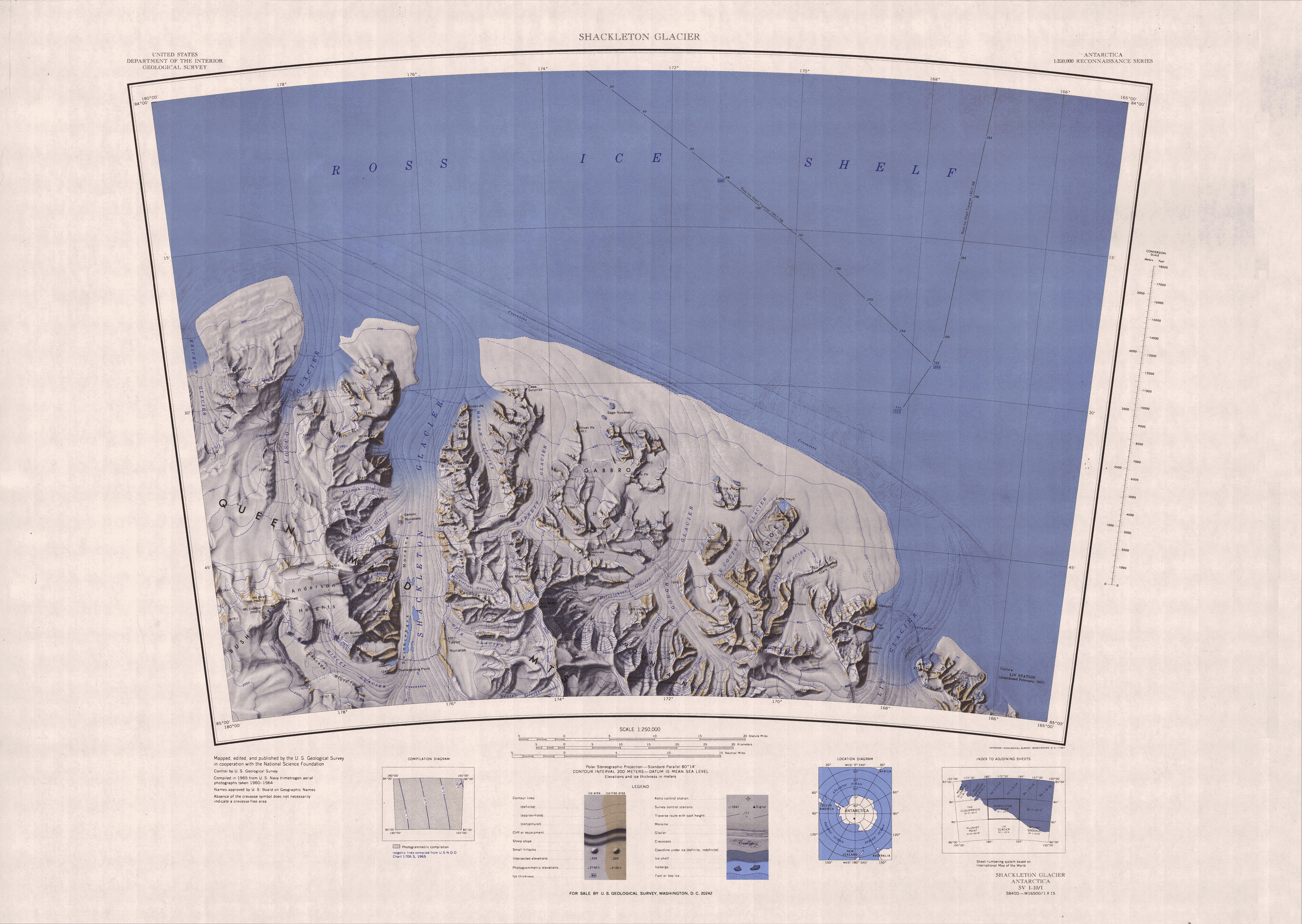
Mouth of Ramsey Glacier to the west, joined by Ericson Glacier.

=== Bowin Glacier ===
84°53′S 177°20′E. A tributary glacier, 5 nautical miles (9.3 km; 5.8 mi) long, flowing northeast between Sullivan Ridge and Fulgham Ridge to enter Ramsey Glacier. Named by US-ACAN for Commissaryman C.F. Bowin, United States Navy, Operation Deep Freeze (OpDFrz), 1965 and 1966.

=== Muck Glacier ===
84°39′S 177°30′E. A glacier between Campbell Cliffs and Sullivan Ridge in the Queen Maud Mountains. It flows generally northward from Husky Heights, and then eastward around the north end of Sullivan Ridge to enter Ramsey Glacier. Named by US-ACAN for Maj. James B. Muck, USA, of the U.S. Army Aviation Detachment which supported the Texas Tech Shackleton Glacier Expedition to this area, 1964-65.

=== Shanklin Glacier ===
84°37′S 176°40′E. A glacier in the Hughes Range, flowing southeast from Mount Waterman to enter Muck Glacier at a point 5 nautical miles (9.3 km; 5.8 mi) west of Ramsey Glacier. Named by US-ACAN for CWO David M. Shanklin, USA, of the United States Army Aviation Detachment which supported the Texas Tech Shackleton Glacier Expedition, 1964-65.

=== Millington Glacier ===
84°32′S 178°00′E. A narrow tributary glacier, 10 nautical miles (19 km; 12 mi) long, flowing from the eastern slopes of Hughes Range into Ramsey Glacier, northward of Mount Valinski. Named by US-ACAN for Lt. Cdr. Richard E. Millington, USN, medical officer with USN OpDFrz, 1963 and 1964.

=== Erickson Glacier ===
84°25′S 179°50′W. A glacier, 12 nautical miles (22 km; 14 mi) long, flowing north from the Queen Maud Mountains, between Mount Young and O'Leary Peak, to join Ramsey Glacier at the edge of the Ross Ice Shelf. Named by US-ACAN for Cdr. J.L. Erickson, USN, commanding officer of the USS Staten Island during USN OpDFrz 1965.

== Features ==
The head of the glacier in the Bush Mountains forms between the Fulgham Ridge and McIntyre Promontory. To the northeast are Layman Peak, Mount Bellows and the Reid Spur, which runs along the east side of the Ramsey Glacier. The Sullivan Ridge, terminating in the Four Ramps, runs along the west side of the Ramsey Glacier to the south of the confluence with the Muck Glacier.

=== Fulgham Ridge ===
84°54′S 177°25′E. A narrow ice-free ridge, 4 nautical miles (7.4 km; 4.6 mi) long, forming the southeast side of Bowin Glacier. Named by US-ACAN for Aviation Boatswain's Mate Donald R. Fulgham, United States Navy, Antarctic Support Activity, who participated in United States Navy OpDFrz, 1964.

=== McIntyre Promontory ===
84°57′S 179°40′E. A promontory having the ground plan of a sharp V pointed toward the north, with steep cliffs on either flank, forming a part of the Bush Mountains at the head of Ramsey Glacier. Discovered and photographed by United States Navy Operation Highjump on Flight 8A of Feb. 16, 1947, and named by US-ACAN for Capt. Eugene C. Mclntyre, USMC, copilot on this flight.

=== Layman Peak ===
84°51′S 179°35′E. A peak, 2,560 metres (8,400 ft) high, standing 3 nautical miles (5.6 km; 3.5 mi) east of Mount Bellows and 4 nautical miles (7.4 km; 4.6 mi) north of Mclntyre Promontory. Discovered and photographed by the USAS on Flight C of February 29–March 1, 1940, and surveyed by A.P. Crary in 1957-58. Named by Crary for Frank Layman, mechanic of the U.S. Ross Ice Shelf Traverse Party (1957-58) and Victoria Land Traverse Party (1958-59).

=== Mount Bellows ===
84°50′S 178°58′E. A mountain, 2,390 metres (7,840 ft) high, located 3 nautical miles (5.6 km; 3.5 mi) west of Layman Peak at the east side of Ramsey Glacier. Named by US-ACAN for Frederick A. Bellows, USN, Radioman at McMurdo Station, 1964.

=== Reid Spur ===
84°46′S 178°30′E. A spur, 5 nautical miles (9.3 km; 5.8 mi) long, descending north along the east side of Ramsey Glacier from an unnamed prominence 3 miles (4.8 km) northwest of Mount Bellows. Named by US-ACAN for CWO James S. Reid, member of the U.S. Army Aviation Detachment which participated in exploring this area with the Texas Tech Shackleton Glacier Expedition, 1964-65.

=== Sullivan Ridge ===
84°47′S 177°05′E. A massive ridge, 15 nautical miles (28 km; 17 mi) long, displaying a steep, irregular east slope overlooking Ramsey Glacier and a low gradient, ice-covered west slope overlooking Muck Glacier. The ridge extends generally north from Husky Heights and terminates at the confluence of Muck and Ramsey Glaciers. Discovered and photographed by United States Navy Operation Highjump (1946-47) and named by US-ACAN for Walter A. Sullivan of the New York Times staff, who has written extensively on Antarctic research and exploration.

=== Four Ramps ===
84°42′S 177°35′E. A group of four small rock spurs, roughly parallel and projecting through the snow surface, forming the northeast part of Sullivan Ridge on the west side of Ramsey Glacier. Discovered and photographed by United States Navy Operation Highjump (1946–47) and given this descriptive name by US-ACAN.

== Sources ==
- Alberts, Fred G., ed. (1995), Geographic Names of the Antarctic (PDF) (2 ed.), United States Board on Geographic Names This article incorporates public domain material from websites or documents of the United States Board on Geographic Names.
- The Cloudmaker, USGS
- Shackleton Glacier, USGS
- This article incorporates public domain material from websites or documents of the United States Geological Survey.
