= Gisela Winckler =

Scientist

- Alma mater: University of Heidelberg
- Scientific career
- Thesis: Radiogenes Helium im Ozean drei Fallstudien (1998)

Gisela Winckler is geoscientist at Lamont–Doherty Earth Observatory who is known for her work on climate change, carbon cycling, and role of aerosols. She was elected a fellow of the American Association for the Advancement of Sciences in 2024.

== Education and career ==
Winckler received an M.Sc. (1998) and a Ph.D. (1998) from the University of Heidelberg. Winckler joined Lamont Doherty in 2001 as a research professor and as fo 2026 she is a professor of climate there.

== Research ==
Winckler is known for her work applying chemical analyses to examine how climate has changed on different time scales. Her early work examined the chemical composition of fluids from the Mediterranean. She has examined dust found in Antarctica, and used research into dust to define changes in climate. She has also investigated hydrothermal activity in the seafloor between New Zealand and Antarctica. As part of her work, Winckler helps publications including USA Today fact check statements about Earth' climate, and she talks to people who are skeptical of climate change.

== Awards and honors ==
Winckler was elected to the American Association for the Advancement of Science in 2024. In 2026 the American Geophysical Union elected her as fellow.

== Selected publications ==
- Suess, E.; Torres, M.E.; Bohrmann, G.; Collier, R.W.; Greinert, J.; Linke, P.; Rehder, G.; Trehu, A.; Wallmann, K.; Winckler, G.; Zuleger, E. (1999). "Gas hydrate destabilization: enhanced dewatering, benthic material turnover and large methane plumes at the Cascadia convergent margin". Earth and Planetary Science Letters. 170 (1–2): 1–15. doi:10.1016/S0012-821X(99)00092-8.
- Winckler, Gisela; Anderson, Robert F.; Fleisher, Martin Q.; McGee, David; Mahowald, Natalie (2008-04-04). "Covariant Glacial-Interglacial Dust Fluxes in the Equatorial Pacific and Antarctica". Science. 320 (5872): 93–96. doi:10.1126/science.1150595. ISSN 0036-8075.
- Winckler, Gisela; Anderson, Robert F.; Jaccard, Samuel L.; Marcantonio, Franco (2016-05-31). "Ocean dynamics, not dust, have controlled equatorial Pacific productivity over the past 500,000 years". Proceedings of the National Academy of Sciences. 113 (22): 6119–6124. doi:10.1073/pnas.1600616113. ISSN 0027-8424. PMC 4896667. PMID 27185933.
