= Mount Young (Antarctica) =

Mountain in Ross Dependency, Antarctica

Mount Young (84°27′S 179°48′E) is a small peak, 770 metres (2,530 ft), at the north end of a spur on the east side of Ramsey Glacier, just south of the Ross Ice Shelf. Discovered and photographed by U.S. Navy Operation Highjump on the flights of February 16, 1947, and named by Advisory Committee on Antarctic Names (US-ACAN) after Harry Richard Young of New Zealand, who was a mechanic on the Byrd Antarctic Expedition, 1928–30 and 1933–35.
