= Grindley Plateau =

Plateau in Antarctica

- Location within Antarctica

Highest point
- Coordinates: 84°9′S 166°5′E

Geography
- Location: Antarctica
- Parent range: Queen Alexandra Range

Grindley Plateau (84°9′S 166°5′E) is a high icecapped plateau in the central Queen Alexandra Range of Antarctica, bordered by the peaks of Mount Mackellar, Mount Bell and Mount Kirkpatrick.

== Name ==
Grindley Plateau was named by the Northern Party of the New Zealand Geological Survey Antarctic Expedition (NZGSAE; 1961–62) for George Grindley, senior geologist of the party.

== Location ==
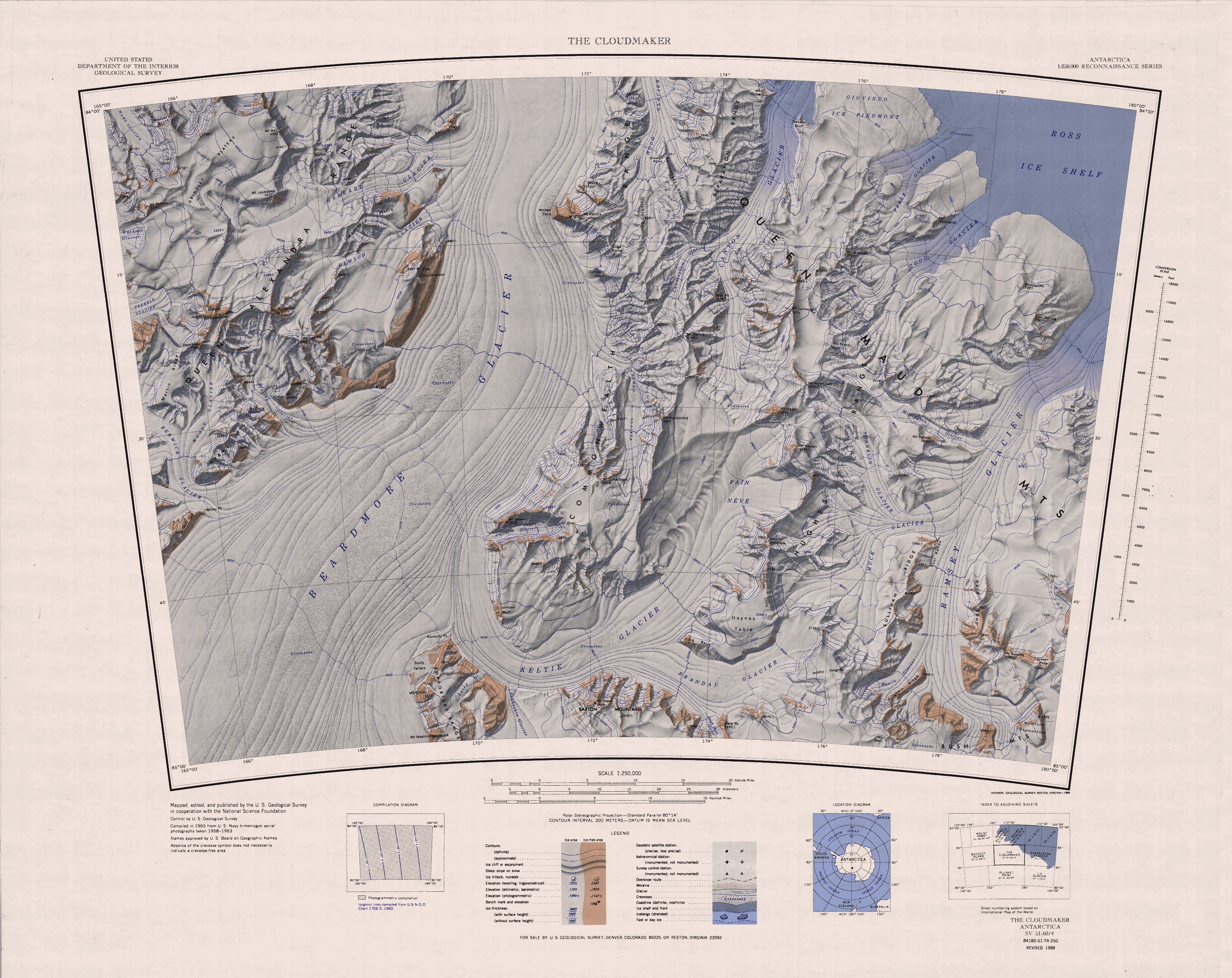
Grindley Plateau in northwest of map

Grindley Plateau is in the central Queen Alexandra Range, north of Mount Kirkpatrick. The Garrard Glacier forms to its south and flows east into the Beardmore Glacier. The Wyckoff Glacier forms to its southeast and flows west to Lennox-King Glacier. The Wahl Glacier forms to its west and flows northwest to Lennox-King Glacier. Features surrounding the plateau include Mallory Bluff, Mount Mackellar, Mount Bell, Mount Kurlak, Mount Lockwood, Mount Stanley and Levi Peak.

== Features ==
=== Mallory Bluff ===
84°02′S 165°50′E. A prominent bluff on the northwest slope of Grindley Plateau, just northeast of the head of Wahl Glacier. Named by the United States Advisory Committee on Antarctic Names (US-ACAN) for Roger P. Mallory, Jr., USARP meteorologist at South Pole Station, 1962, and at Wilkes Station, 1963.

=== Mount Bell ===
84°04′S 167°30′E. A bluff-type mountain, 4,305 metres (14,124 ft) high, forming a part of the northeast edge of Grindley Plateau, 6 nautical miles (11 km; 6.9 mi) southeast of Mount Mackellar. Named by the British Antarctic Expedition, 1907–09 (BrAE) for William Bell, a relative of Ernest Shackleton and supporter of the expedition.

=== Mount Kurlak ===
84°05′S 168°00′E. An ice-covered mountain 3 nautical miles (5.6 km; 3.5 mi) southeast of Mount Bell. Named by US-ACAN for Lieutenant Commander William B. Kurlak, United States Navy, aircraft commander during United States Navy OpDFrz, 1964.

=== Mount Lockwood ===
84°09′S 167°24′E. A projecting-type mountain 5 nautical miles (9.3 km; 5.8 mi) south of Mount Bell, forming a part of the east face of Grindley Plateau. The above is the interpretation of Shackleton's intended position for this mountain made by the Southern Party of NZGSAE (1961-62), which explored this region. Named by BrAE (1907–09) for Doctor C.B. Lockwood of St. Bartholomew Hospital, where Doctor E.S. Marshall of BrAE had previously been employed.

=== Mount Stanley ===
84°09′S 165°29′E. A peak, 3,220 metres (10,560 ft) high, standing northeast of the head of Wyckoff Glacier near the western limits of Grindley Plateau. Named by the BrAE (1907–09) for the eldest brother of Doctor E.S. Marshall, a member of the expedition. This identification is the NZGSAE (1961-62) interpretation of the original positioning by the BrAE (1907-09).

=== Levi Peak ===
84°08′S 165°06′E. A rock peak 2 nautical miles (3.7 km; 2.3 mi) northwest of Mount Stanley, at the western edge of Grindley Plateau. Named by US-ACAN for Gene S. Levi, meteorologist at Hallett Station, winter 1963, and 1964-65 summer season.

== Sources ==
- Alberts, Fred G., ed. (1995), Geographic Names of the Antarctic (PDF) (2 ed.), United States Board on Geographic Names This article incorporates public domain material from websites or documents of the United States Board on Geographic Names.
- The Cloudmaker, USGS: United States Geological Survey
- This article incorporates public domain material from websites or documents of the United States Geological Survey.
