= Lennox-King Glacier =

Glacier in Antarctica

- Location within Antarctica
- Coordinates: 83°25′S 168°0′E
- Length: 70 kilometres (43 mi)
- Terminus: Richards Inlet, Ross Ice Shelf

Lennox-King Glacier is a large valley glacier, about 40 nautical miles (70 km) long that flows east into the Ross Ice Shelf.

== Location ==
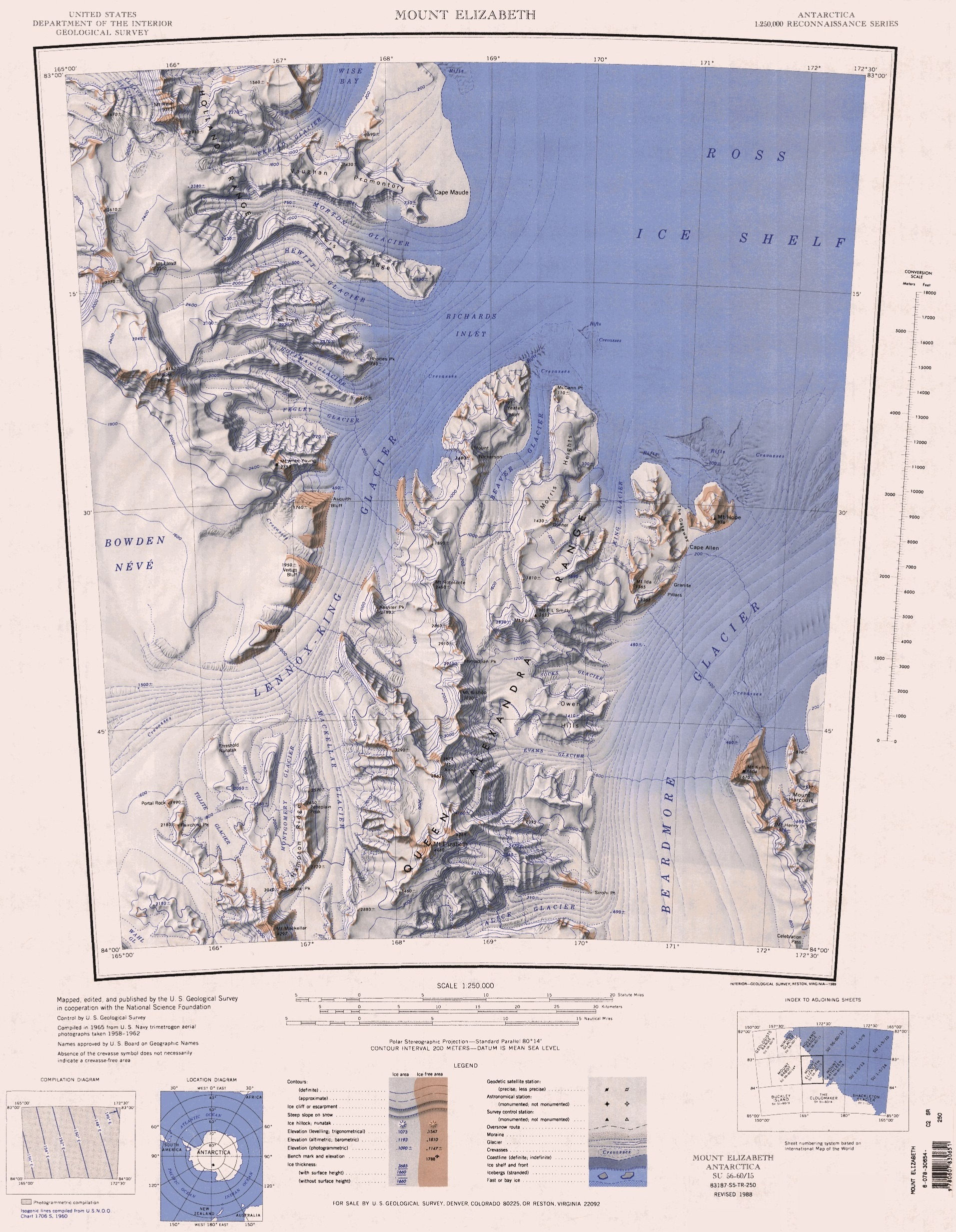
Lower part of the glacier, to the southwest of the map.

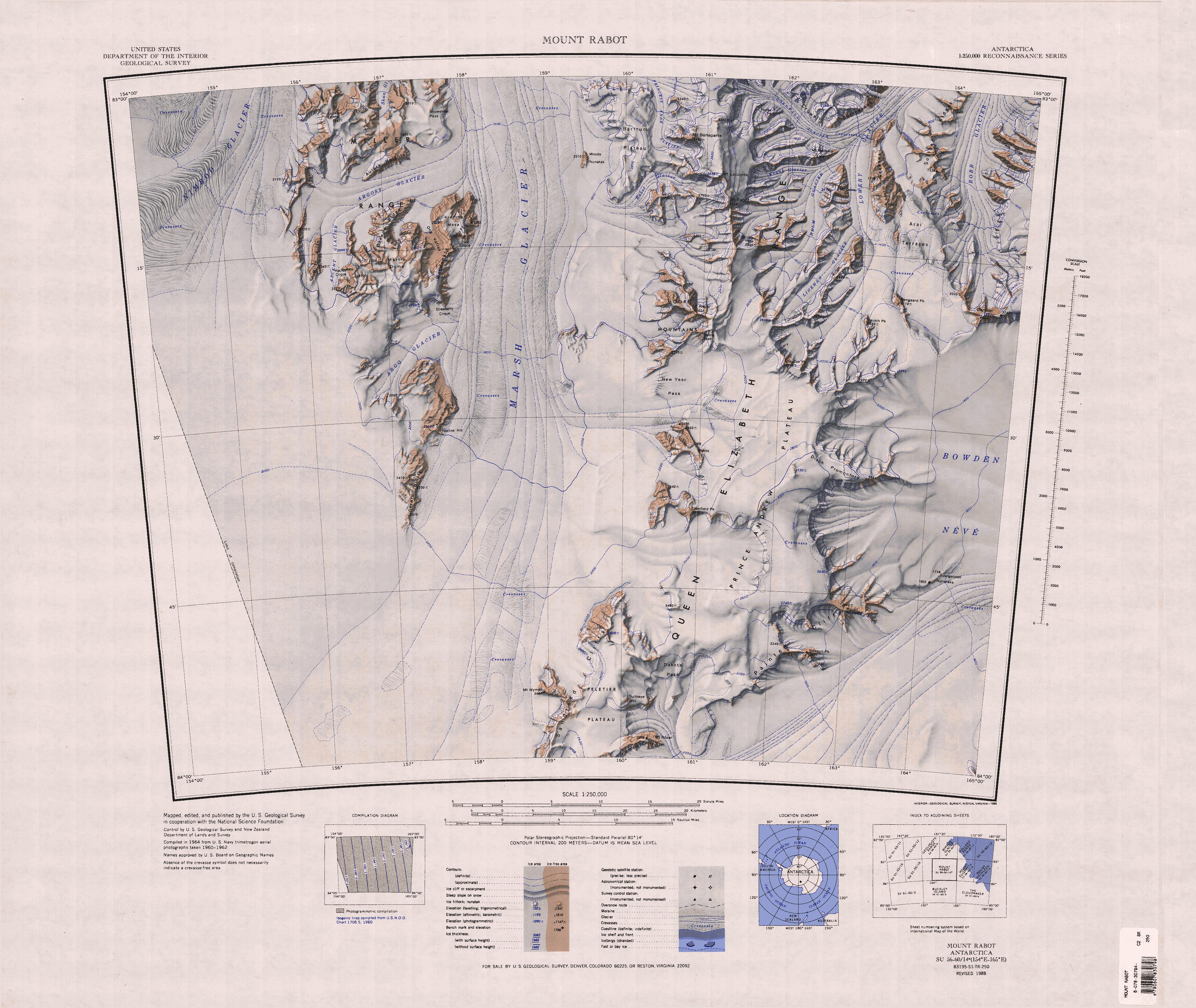
Bowden Névé and part of the upper glacier, to the southeast of the map.

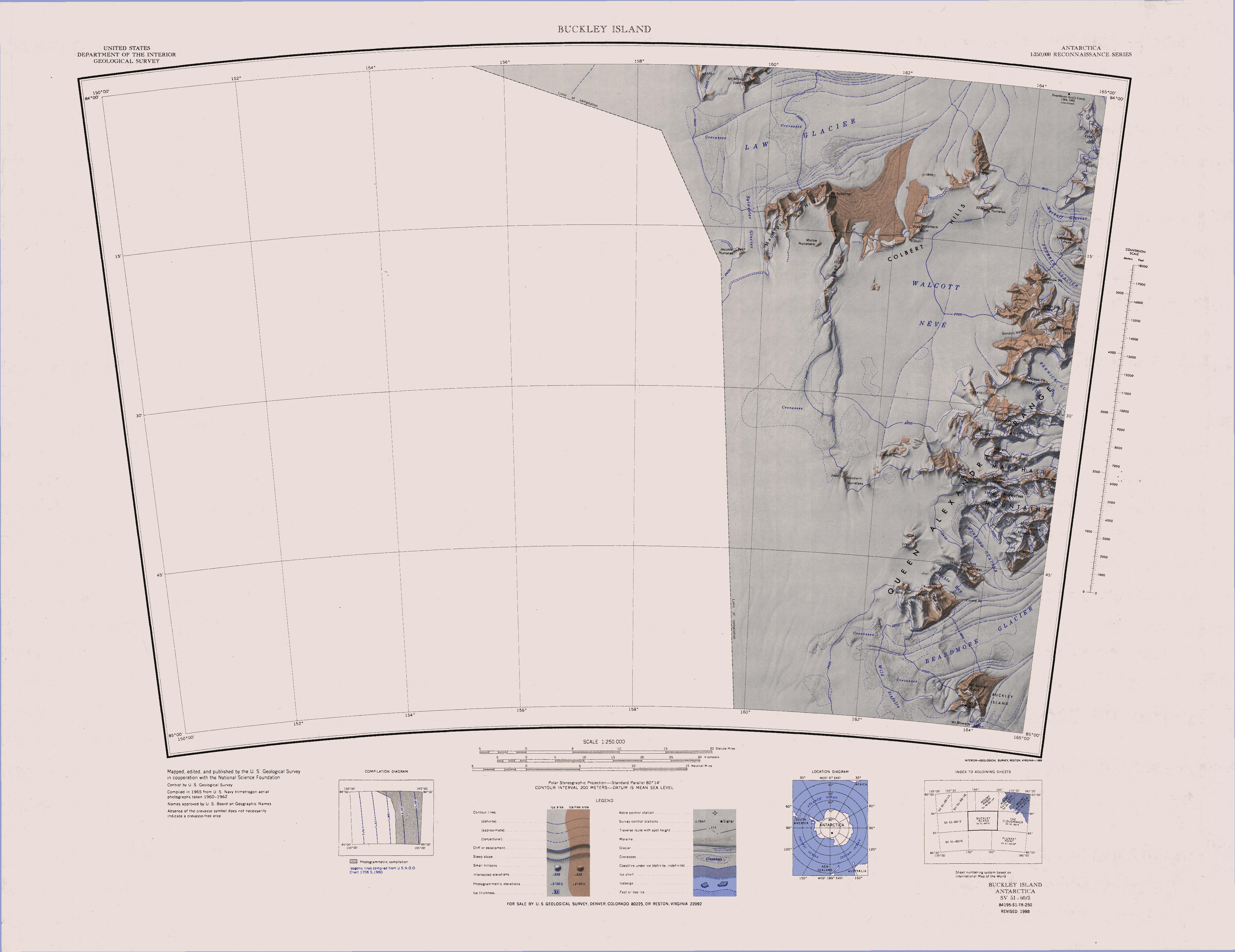
Law Glacier and Walcott Névé at the head of the glacier.

Lennox-King Glacier drains Bowden Névé and flows northeast between the Holland Range and the Queen Alexandra Range of Antarctica to enter Richards Inlet and the Ross Ice Shelf. The Law Glacier supplies ice to the Lennox-King Glacier, leading some glaciologists to refer to it as the Law/Lennox-King Glacier system or Law-Lennox-King glacier corridor. Its mouth is south of the Robb Glacier and west of the Beardmore Glacier.

Lennox-King Glacier was named by the New Zealand Geological Survey Antarctic Expedition (1959–60) for Lieutenant Commander James Lennox-King, Royal New Zealand Navy, leader at Scott Base, 1960.

== Mouth ==
=== Richards Inlet ===
83°20′S 168°30′E. A large ice-filled inlet at the mouth of Lennox-King Glacier, opening to the Ross Ice Shelf just southeast of Lewis Ridge. Named by the NZGSAE (1959–60) for R. W. Richards, a member of the Ross Sea Party of the Imperial Trans-Antarctic Expedition (1914–17), who assisted in laying depots as far south as Mount Hope for Shackleton's proposed crossing of Antarctica.

=== Asquith Bluff ===
83°30′S 167°21′E. A prominent wedge-shaped rock bluff on the west side of Lennox-King Glacier, 4 miles (6.4 km) southeast of Mount Allen Young. Discovered by the BrAE (1907–09) and named "Mount Asquith" for Lord Oxford and Asquith, Prime Minister, 1908–16, who was instrumental in securing a grant from the United Kingdom Government to pay off the expedition's debts. Not: Mount Asquith.

=== Vertigo Bluff ===
83°35′S 167°00′E. A prominent rock bluff, 1,950 metres (6,400 ft) high, located 4 miles (6.4 km) souith of Asquith Bluff on the west side of Lennox-King Glacier. Rock samples were collected at the bluff by John Gunner and Henry Brecher of the Ohio State University Geological Expedition, 1969-70. The name suggested by Gunner reflects the precipitous nature of the bluff face.

== Névé ==
The glacier is fed by the Bowden Névé. This in turn is fed by the Law Glacier and the Walcott Névé.

=== Bowden Névé ===
83°30′S 165°00′E. A névé about 20 miles (32 km) wide, lying southward of Mount Miller between Queen Elizabeth Range and Queen Alexandra Range. Observed in 1958 by the N.Z. Southern Party of the CTAE (1956–58) and named for Charles M. Bowden, Chairman of the Ross Sea Committee which organized the N.Z. party of the CTAE.

=== Law Glacier ===
84°05′S 161°00′E. A glacier about 10 miles (16 km) wide between the south end of Queen Elizabeth Range and the MacAlpine Hills, gradually descending east-north-east from the polar plateau to Bowden Névé. Named by the N.Z. party of the CTAE (1956–58) for B.R. Law, Deputy-Chairman of the Ross Sea Committee.

=== Sylwester Glacier ===
84°14′S 159°48′E. A glacier, 5 miles (8.0 km) long, flowing north between Jacobs Nunatak and MacAlpine Hills into Law Glacier. Named by US-ACAN for David W. Sylwester, USARP aurora scientist at South Pole Station, winter 1961, and Byrd Station, summer, 1961-62.

=== Walcott Névé ===
84°23′S 162°40′E. A névé, about 350 square miles (910 km^{2}) in area, bounded by the Marshall Mountains, Lewis Cliff and Mount Sirius. Named by the Northern Party of the NZGSAE (1961–62) for Richard Walcott, party leader and geologist.

=== Prebble Glacier ===
84°16′S 164°30′E. A glacier, 9 miles (14 km) long, flowing westward from Mount Kirkpatrick in Queen Alexandra Range to enter Walcott Neve north of Fremouw Peak. Named by the Northern Party of the NZGSAE (1961–62) for Michael Prebble, of the base support party, who assisted the party with preparations and training.

=== Wyckoff Glacier ===
84°11′S 164°40′E. A glacier, 6 miles (9.7 km) long, flowing west from Grindley Plateau in Queen Alexandra Range, just north of Lamping Peak. Named by US-ACAN for Kent A. Wyckoff, USARP meteorologist at Hallett Station, 1963.

== Left tributaries ==
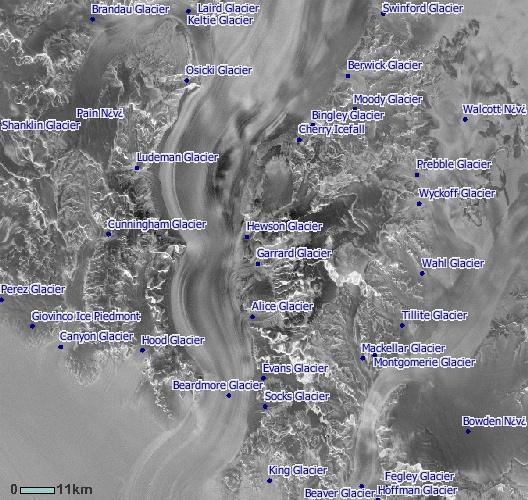
NASA Radarsat Image of Antarctic Glaciers Showing Lennox-King to the right

Tributaries of Lennox-King Glacier, and glaciers that enter Richards Inlet from the left (north), are:

=== Fegley Glacier ===
83°24′S 167°25′E. A tributary glacier in the Holland Range, flowing east into Lennox-King Glacier, 5 miles (8.0 km) northeast of Mount Alien Young. Named by US-ACAN for Lt. Charles E. Fegley, III, CEC, USN, officer in charge of the nuclear power unit at McMurdo Station during OpDFrz, 1964.

=== Hoffman Glacier ===
83°22′S 167°40′E. A narrow glacier, 10 miles (16 km) long, flowing eastward from Mount Miller in the Holland Range to enter Lennox-King Glacier south of Rhodes Peak. Named by US-AC AN for Lt. Cdr. Robert D. Hoffman, USN, commanding officer of the USS Mills during OpDFrz, 1965.

=== Hewitt Glacier ===
83°17′S 167°50′E. A glacier, 15 miles (24 km) long, descending the east slopes of Holland Range between Lewis Ridge and Mount Tripp to enter Richards Inlet. Named by the NZGSAE (1959–60) for Leonard R. Hewitt, leader at Scott Base, 1959.

=== Morton Glacier ===
83°12′S 168°00′E. A glacier, 15 miles (24 km) long, descending eastward from Holland Range between Vaughan Promontory and Lewis Ridge to the Ross Ice Shelf. Named by US-ACAN for Lt. Cdr. John A. Morton, officer in charge of USN Squadron VX-6 Detachment ALFA, which wintered at McMurdo Station, 1964.

== Right tributaries ==
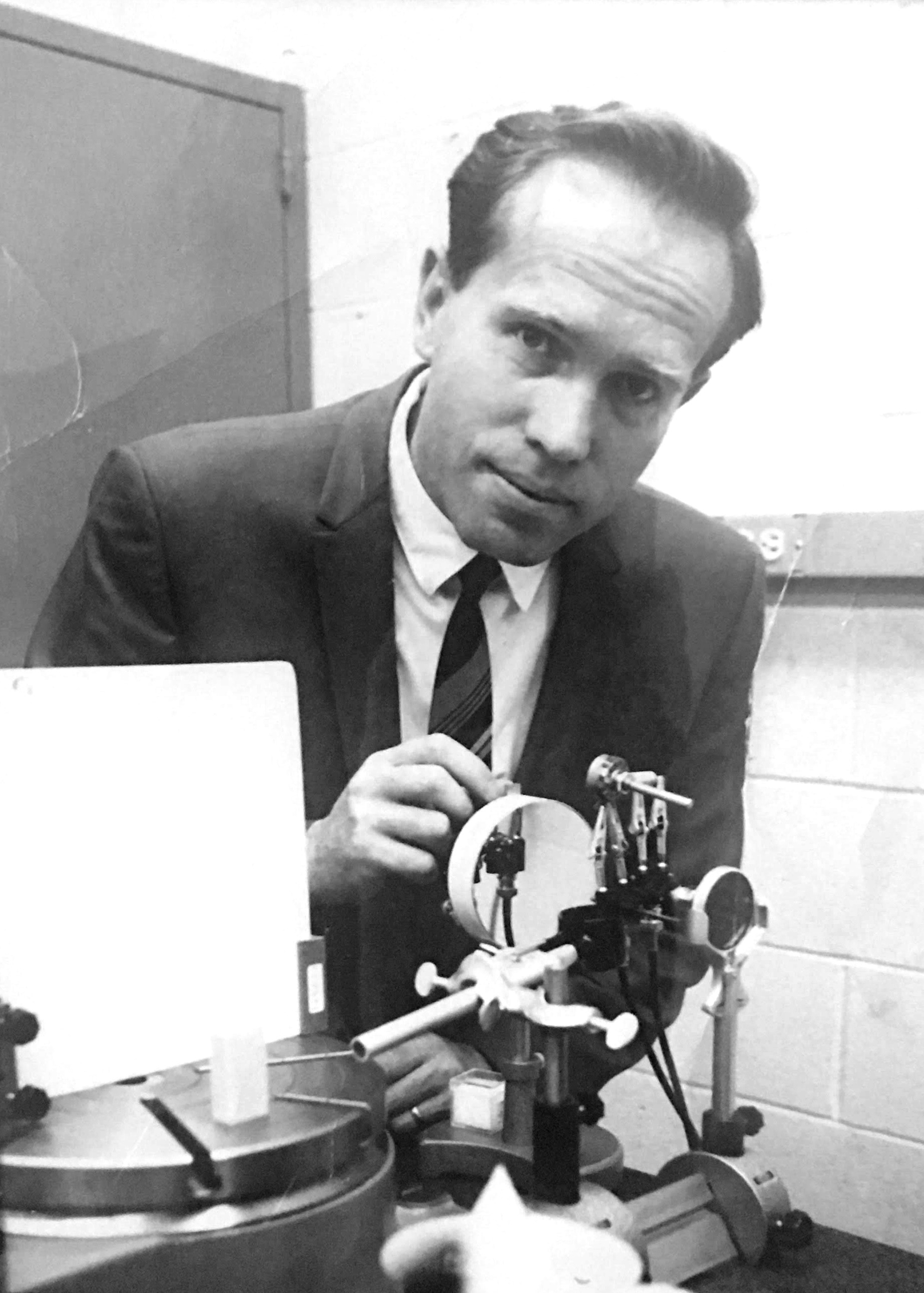
Bruno Wahl

=== Wahl Glacier ===
83°59′S 165°06′E. A glacier, 10 miles (16 km) long, flowing northwest from Grindley Plateau to enter upper Lennox-King Glacier westward of Mount Mackellar. Named by US-ACAN for Bruno W. Wahl, USARP ionospheric physicist at McMurdo Station, 1962.

=== Tillite Glacier ===
83°51′S 166°00′E. A tributary glacier flowing northwest from Pagoda Peak in Queen Alexandra Range to join Lennox-King Glacier north of Fairchild Peak. So named by NZGSAE (1961–62) because it contains outcrops of ancient moraine (tillite), indicative of glacial action in remote Paleozoic times.

=== Montgomerie Glacier ===
83°47′S 166°55′E. A narrow tributary glacier, 10 miles (16 km) long, flowing north along the west side of Hampton Ridge in Queen Alexandra Range to enter Lennox-King Glacier. Named by the Northern Party of the NZGSAE (1961–62) for John Montgomerie, assistant surveyor of that party. Not: Montgomery Glacier.

=== Mackellar Glacier ===
83°47′S 167°15′E. A large tributary glacier in Queen Alexandra Range, flowing north along the east side of Hampton Ridge from Mount Mackellar, to enter Lennox-King Glacier. Named by the NZGSAE (1961–62) in association with Mount Mackellar. Not: Bell Glacier.

== Sources ==
- Alberts, Fred G., ed. (1995), Geographic Names of the Antarctic (PDF) (2 ed.), United States Board on Geographic Names This article incorporates public domain material from websites or documents of the United States Board on Geographic Names.
- Bader, Nicole A.; Licht, Kathy J.; Kaplan, Michael R.; Kassab, Christine; Winckler, Gisela (2016), "East Antarctic ice sheet stability recorded in a high-elevation ice-cored moraine", Quaternary Science Reviews, 159, Elsevier: 88–102, doi:10.1016/j.quascirev.2016.12.005
- Buckley Island, USGS
- Holland Range, USGS
- Martin, A.P.; van der Wal, W. (2023), The Geochemistry and Geophysics of the Antarctic Mantle, Geological Society of London, ISBN 9781786204677
- Mount Elizabeth, USGS
- Mount Rabot, USGS
