= List of extreme summits of North America =

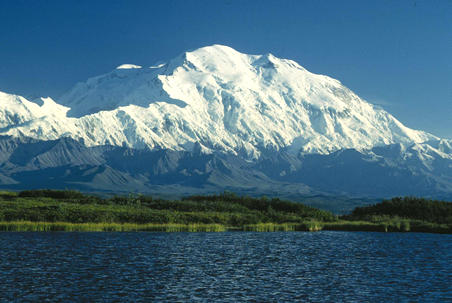
Denali in Alaska is the highest mountain peak of North America. Denali is the third most topographically prominent and third most topographically isolated summit on Earth after Mount Everest and Aconcagua.

This article comprises four sortable tables of mountain summits of greater North America that are the higher than any other point north or south of their latitude or east or west their longitude in North America.

The summit of a mountain or hill may be measured in three principal ways:

1. The topographic elevation of a summit measures the height of the summit above a geodetic sea level.
2. The topographic prominence of a summit is a measure of how high the summit rises above its surroundings.
3. The topographic isolation (or radius of dominance) of a summit measures how far the summit lies from its nearest point of equal elevation.

== Northernmost high summits ==
The following summits range from Greenland and Ellesmere Island to Alaska.

The northernmost summits of their elevation in greater North America
Rank	Mountain Peak	Region	Mountain range	Elevation	Prominence	Isolation	Location
9	Mara Mountain (Note: Mara Mountain is the northernmost 1000-meter (3281-foot) summit on Earth.)	Greenland	Island of Greenland	1155 m 3,790 ft	1149 m 3,770 ft	37.5 km 23.3 mi	83.5715°N 30.4784°W
8	Peary Land high point (Note: The apex of Peary Land is the northernmost summit of its elevation of Greenland and greater North America.)	Greenland	Island of Greenland	1910 m 6,266 ft	500 m 1,640 ft	509 km 317 mi	83.3167°N 35.3333°W
7	Barbeau Peak (Note: The summit of Barbeau Peak is the highest point of Ellesmere Island and Nunavut of Canada.) (Note: Barbeau Peak is the northernmost ultra-prominent summit of Canada and greater North America.)	Nunavut	Ellesmere Island	2616 m 8,583 ft	2616 m 8,583 ft	796 km 495 mi	81.9148°N 75.0093°W
6	Petermann Bjerg (Note: Petermann Bjerg is the northernmost and easternmost summit of its elevation of Greenland and greater North America.)	Greenland	Island of Greenland	2933 m 9,623 ft	1200 m 3,937 ft	288 km 179.1 mi	73.0905°N 28.6187°W
5	Greenland Ice Sheet high point (Note: The apex of the Greenland ice sheet is the northernmost 3000-meter (9843-foot) summit of Greenland and greater North America.)	Greenland	Island of Greenland	3238 m 10,623 ft	500 m 1,640 ft	476 km 296 mi	72.4667°N 37.1000°W
4	Gunnbjørn Fjeld (Note: The summit of Gunnbjørn Fjeld is the highest point of the Island of Greenland, Kalaallit Nunaat, the Kingdom of Denmark, and the entire Arctic.) (Note: Gunnbjørn Fjeld is the easternmost summit of its elevation in greater North America.)	Greenland	Island of Greenland	3694 m 12,119 ft	3694 m 12,119 ft	3,254.13	68.9184°N 29.8991°W
3	Mount Deborah (Note: Mount Deborah is the northernmost summit of its elevation in Alaska, the United States, and greater North America.)	Alaska	Alaska Range	3761 m 12,339 ft	1582 m 5,189 ft	25.9 km 16.08 mi	63.6377°N 147.2384°W
2	Mount Hayes (Note: The summit of Mount Hayes is the highest point of the Hayes Range.) (Note: Mount Hayes is the northernmost 4000-meter (13,123-foot) summit of Alaska, the United States, and greater North America.)	Alaska	Alaska Range	4216 m 13,832 ft	3507 m 11,507 ft	202 km 125.5 mi	63.6203°N 146.7178°W
1	Denali (Note: The summit of Denali is the highest point of the Alaska Range, the State of Alaska, the United States of America, and greater North America. Denali is the third most topographically prominent and third most topographically isolated summit on Earth after Mount Everest and Aconcagua.) (Mount McKinley)	Alaska	Alaska Range	6190.5 m 20,310 ft	6141 m 20,146 ft	7,450.24	63.0690°N 151.0063°W

== Southernmost high summits ==
The following summits range from Panamá to Alaska.

The southernmost summits of their elevation in greater North America
Rank	Mountain Peak	Region	Mountain range	Elevation	Prominence	Isolation	Location
10	Cerro Hoya (Note: Cerro Hoya is the southernmost 1000-meter (3281-foot) summit of Central America and greater North America.)	Panama	Azuero Peninsula	1559 m 5,115 ft	500 m 1,640 ft	135.7 km 84.3 mi	7.3179°N 80.6810°W
9	Cerro Tacarcuna (Note: Cerro Tacarcuna is the southernmost ultra-prominent summit of Central America and greater North America.)	Panama	Darién	1875 m 6,152 ft	1770 m 5,807 ft	174.4 km 108.3 mi	8.1659°N 77.2959°W
8	Volcán Barú (Note: The summit of Volcán Barú is the highest point of the Republic of Panama.) (Note: Volcán Barú is the southernmost 3000-meter (9843-foot) summit of Central America and greater North America.)	Panama	Chiriquí	3474 m 11,398 ft	1324 m 4,344 ft	74.2 km 46.1 mi	8.8088°N 82.5427°W
7	Chirripó Grande (Note: The summit of Chirripó Grande is the highest point of the Republic of Costa Rica.) (Note: Chirripó Grande is the southernmost and easternmost summit of its elevation in Central America and greater North America.) (Cerro Chirripó)	Costa Rica	Cordillera de Talamanca	3819 m 12,530 ft	3755 m 12,320 ft	878 km 546 mi	9.4843°N 83.4889°W
6	Volcán Acatenango (Note: Volcán Acatenango is the southernmost and easternmost summit of its elevation in Central America and greater North America.)	Guatemala	Chimaltenango	3975 m 13,041 ft	1835 m 6,020 ft	125.9 km 78.2 mi	14.5016°N 90.8755°W
5	Volcán Tajumulco (Note: The summit of Volcán Tajumulco is the highest point of the Sierra de las Nubes, the Republic of Guatemala, and all of Central America.) (Note: Volcán Tajumulco is the southernmost and easternmost 4000-meter (13,123-foot) summit of greater North America.)	Guatemala	Sierra de las Nubes	4220 m 13,845 ft	3990 m 13,091 ft	722 km 448 mi	15.0430°N 91.9037°W
4	Popocatépetl (Note: Popocatépetl on the border of Puebla is the highest point of both Estado Libre y Soberano de México and Estado Libre y Soberano de Morelos.) (Note: Popocatépetl is the southernmost 5000-meter (16,404-foot) summit of México and greater North America.)	México (state); Morelos; Puebla	Cordillera Neovolcanica	5410 m 17,749 ft	3040 m 9,974 ft	143 km 88.8 mi	19.0225°N 98.6278°W
3	Pico de Orizaba (Note: The summit of Pico de Orizaba is the highest point of Estado Libre y Soberano de Puebla, Estado Libre y Soberano de Veracruz de Ignacio de la Llave, and all of México.) (Citlaltépetl)	Puebla; Veracruz	Cordillera Neovolcanica	5636 m 18,491 ft	4922 m 16,148 ft	2,690.14	19.0305°N 97.2698°W
2	Mount Logan (Note: The summit of Mount Logan is the highest point of the Saint Elias Mountains, Yukon, and all of Canada.)	Yukon	Saint Elias Mountains	5956 m 19,541 ft	5247 m 17,215 ft	623 km 387 mi	60.5671°N 140.4055°W
1	Denali (Mount McKinley)	Alaska	Alaska Range	6190.5 m 20,310 ft	6141 m 20,146 ft	7,450.24	63.0690°N 151.0063°W

== Easternmost high summits ==
The following summits range from Greenland to Costa Rica to Alaska.

The easternmost summits of their elevation in greater North America
Rank	Mountain Peak	Region	Mountain range	Elevation	Prominence	Isolation	Location
12	Hahn Land high point (Note: The apex of Hahn Land is the easternmost ultra-prominent summit of Greenland and greater North America.)	Greenland	Island of Greenland	1744 m 5,722 ft	1694 m 5,558 ft	347 km 216 mi	80.4333°N 19.8333°W
11	Favres Bjerg (Note: Favres Bjerg is the easternmost 2000-meter (6562-foot) summit of Greenland and greater North America.)	Greenland	Island of Greenland	2000 m 6,562 ft	1546 m 5,072 ft	117.1 km 72.8 mi	73.9500°N 23.2000°W
10	Stauning Alper (Note: Stauning Alper is the easternmost summit of its elevation of Greenland and greater North America.)	Greenland	Island of Greenland	2831 m 9,288 ft	2181 m 7,156 ft	164.9 km 102.5 mi	72.1167°N 24.9000°W
9	Petermann Bjerg	Greenland	Island of Greenland	2933 m 9,623 ft	1200 m 3,937 ft	288 km 179.1 mi	73.0905°N 28.6187°W
8	Ejnar Mikkelsen Fjeld (Note: Ejnar Mikkelsen Fjeld is the easternmost 3000-meter (9843-foot) summit of Greenland and greater North America.)	Greenland	Island of Greenland	3325 m 10,909 ft	1625 m 5,331 ft	16.29 km 10.12 mi	68.8957°N 28.6279°W
7	Gunnbjørn Fjeld	Greenland	Island of Greenland	3694 m 12,119 ft	3694 m 12,119 ft	3,254.13	68.9184°N 29.8991°W
6	Chirripó Grande (Cerro Chirripó)	Costa Rica	Cordillera de Talamanca	3819 m 12,530 ft	3755 m 12,320 ft	878 km 546 mi	9.4843°N 83.4889°W
5	Volcán Acatenango	Guatemala	Chimaltenango	3975 m 13,041 ft	1835 m 6,020 ft	125.9 km 78.2 mi	14.5016°N 90.8755°W
4	Volcán Tajumulco	Guatemala	Sierra de las Nubes	4220 m 13,845 ft	3990 m 13,091 ft	722 km 448 mi	15.0430°N 91.9037°W
3	Pico de Orizaba (Citlaltépetl)	Puebla; Veracruz	Cordillera Neovolcanica	5636 m 18,491 ft	4922 m 16,148 ft	2,690.14	19.0305°N 97.2698°W
2	Mount Logan	Yukon	Saint Elias Mountains	5956 m 19,541 ft	5247 m 17,215 ft	623 km 387 mi	60.5671°N 140.4055°W
1	Denali (Mount McKinley)	Alaska	Alaska Range	6190.5 m 20,310 ft	6141 m 20,146 ft	7,450.24	63.0690°N 151.0063°W

== Westernmost high summits ==
All of the following summits are located in the US State of Alaska.

The westernmost summits of their elevation in greater North America
Rank	Mountain Peak	Region	Mountain range	Elevation	Prominence	Isolation	Location
14	Buldir Volcano (Note: The summit of Buldir Volcano is the highest point of Buldir Island.) (Note: Buldir Volcano is the westernmost 500-meter (1640-foot) summit of Alaska, the United States, and greater North America.)	Alaska	Buldir Island	656 m 2,152 ft	656 m 2,152 ft	118.7 km 73.8 mi	52.3482°N 175.9105°E
13	Kiska Volcano (Note: The summit of Kiska Volcano is the highest point of Kiska Island.) (Note: Kiska Volcano is the westernmost 1000-meter (3281-foot) summit of Alaska, the United States, and greater North America.)	Alaska	Kiska Island	1220 m 4,004 ft	1220 m 4,004 ft	137.7 km 85.6 mi	52.1027°N 177.6030°E
12	Anvil Peak (Note: The summit of Anvil Peak is the highest point of Semisopochnoi Island and the Rat Islands.) (Note: Anvil Peak is the westernmost summit of its elevation in Alaska, the United States, and greater North America.)	Alaska	Semisopochnoi Island	1221 m 4,007 ft	1221 m 4,007 ft	112.6 km 70 mi	51.9859°N 179.6021°E
11	Gareloi Volcano (Note: The summit of Gareloi Volcano is the highest point of Gareloi Island.) (Note: Gareloi Volcano is the westernmost ultra-prominent summit of Alaska, the United States, and greater North America.)	Alaska	Gareloi Island	1573 m 5,160 ft	1573 m 5,160 ft	46.1 km 28.6 mi	51.7880°N 178.7940°W
10	Tanaga Volcano (Note: The summit of Tanaga Volcano is the highest point of Tanaga Island and the Andreanof Islands.) (Note: Tanaga Volcano is the westernmost summit of its elevation in Alaska, the United States, and greater North America.)	Alaska	Tanaga Island	1806 m 5,925 ft	1806 m 5,925 ft	656 km 407 mi	51.8838°N 178.1429°W
9	Mount Vsevidof (Note: The summit of Mount Vsevidof is the highest point of Umnak Island and the Fox Islands.) (Note: Mount Vsevidof is the westernmost 2000-meter (6562-foot) summit of Alaska, the United States, and greater North America.)	Alaska	Umnak Island	2149 m 7,051 ft	2149 m 7,051 ft	358 km 223 mi	53.1256°N 168.6938°W
8	Shishaldin Volcano (Note: The summit of Shishaldin Volcano is the highest point of Unimak Island and the Aleutian Islands.) (Note: Shishaldin Volcano is the westernmost summit of its elevation in Alaska, the United States, and greater North America.)	Alaska	Unimak Island	2869 m 9,414 ft	2869 m 9,414 ft	877 km 545 mi	54.7554°N 163.9709°W
7	Mount Hesperus (Note: The summit of Mount Hesperus is the highest point of the western Alaska Range.) (Note: Mount Hesperus is the westernmost summit of its elevation in Alaska and greater North America.)	Alaska	Alaska Range	2996 m 9,828 ft	2127 m 6,978 ft	93.5 km 58.1 mi	61.8036°N 154.1469°W
6	Iliamna Volcano (Note: Iliamna Volcano is the westernmost 3000-meter (9843-foot) summit of Alaska and greater North America.)	Alaska	Chigmit Mountains	3053 m 10,016 ft	2398 m 7,866 ft	54.1 km 33.6 mi	60.0321°N 153.0915°W
5	Redoubt Volcano (Note: The summit of Redoubt Volcano is the highest point of the Chigmit Mountains.) (Note: Redoubt Volcano is the westernmost summit of its elevation in Alaska and greater North America.)	Alaska	Chigmit Mountains	3108 m 10,197 ft	2788 m 9,147 ft	94.5 km 58.7 mi	60.4854°N 152.7442°W
4	Mount Torbert (Note: The summit of Mount Torbert is the highest point of the Tordrillo Mountains.) (Note: Mount Torbert is the westernmost summit of its elevation in Alaska and greater North America.)	Alaska	Alaska Range	3479 m 11,413 ft	2648 m 8,688 ft	157.3 km 97.7 mi	61.4086°N 152.4125°W
3	Mount Russell (Note: Mount Russell is the westernmost summit of its elevation in Alaska and greater North America.)	Alaska	Alaska Range	3557 m 11,670 ft	1682 m 5,520 ft	22.7 km 14.07 mi	62.7984°N 151.8845°W
2	Mount Foraker (Note: Mount Foraker is the westernmost 5000-meter (16,404-foot) summit of Alaska, the United States, and greater North America.)	Alaska	Alaska Range	5304 m 17,400 ft	2210 m 7,250 ft	23 km 14.27 mi	62.9604°N 151.3998°W
1	Denali (Mount McKinley)	Alaska	Alaska Range	6190.5 m 20,310 ft	6141 m 20,146 ft	7,450.24	63.0690°N 151.0063°W

== Gallery ==
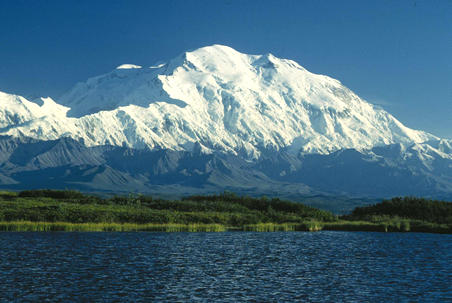
Denali in Alaska is the highest summit of the United States and North America.

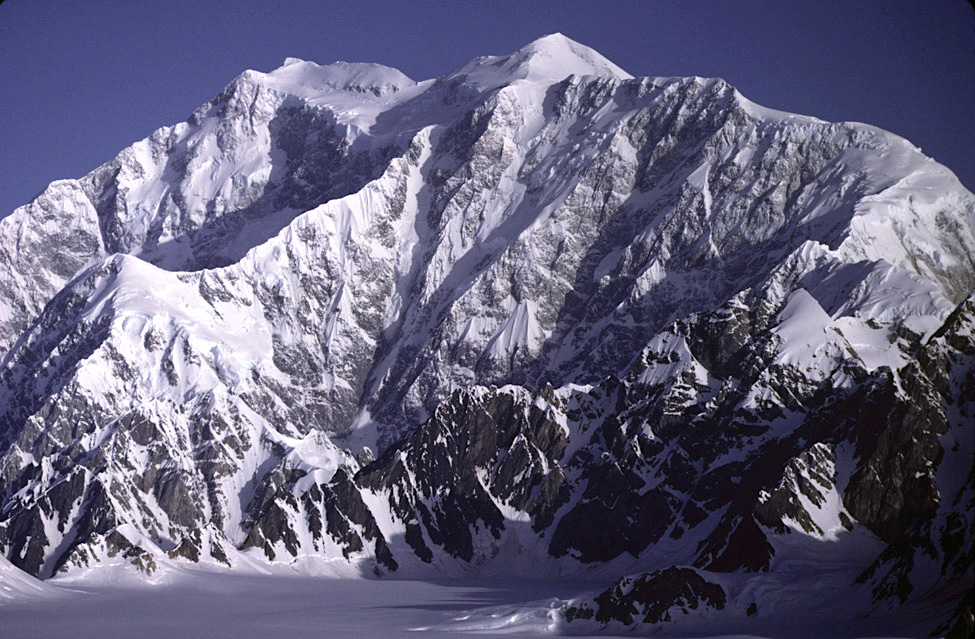
Mount Logan in Yukon is the highest summit of Canada.

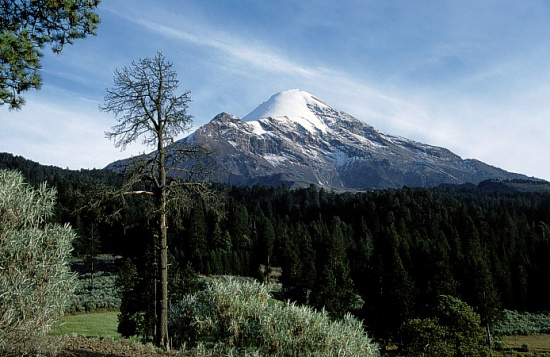
Pico de Orizaba is the highest summit of México.

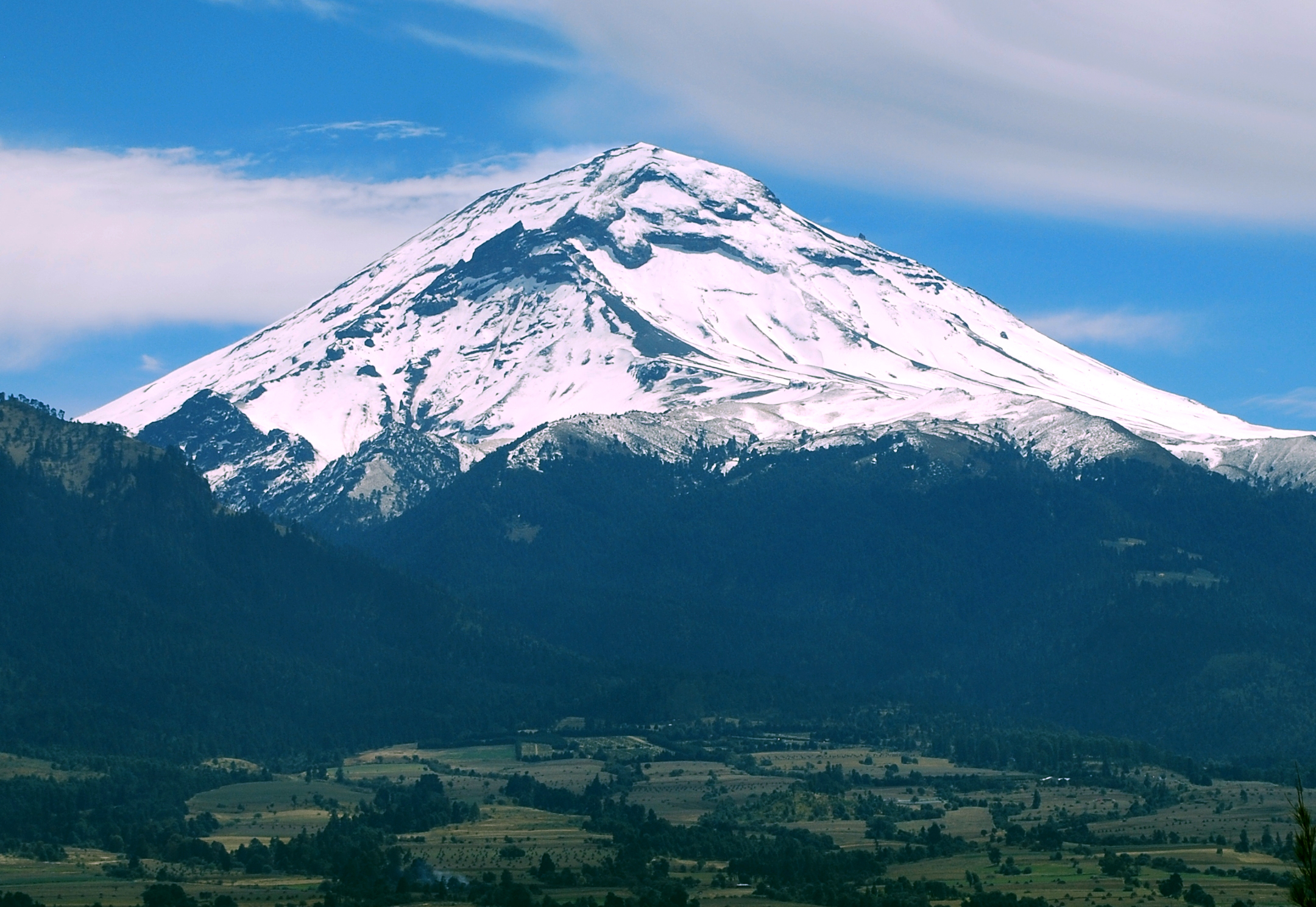
Popocatépetl is the second highest summit of México.

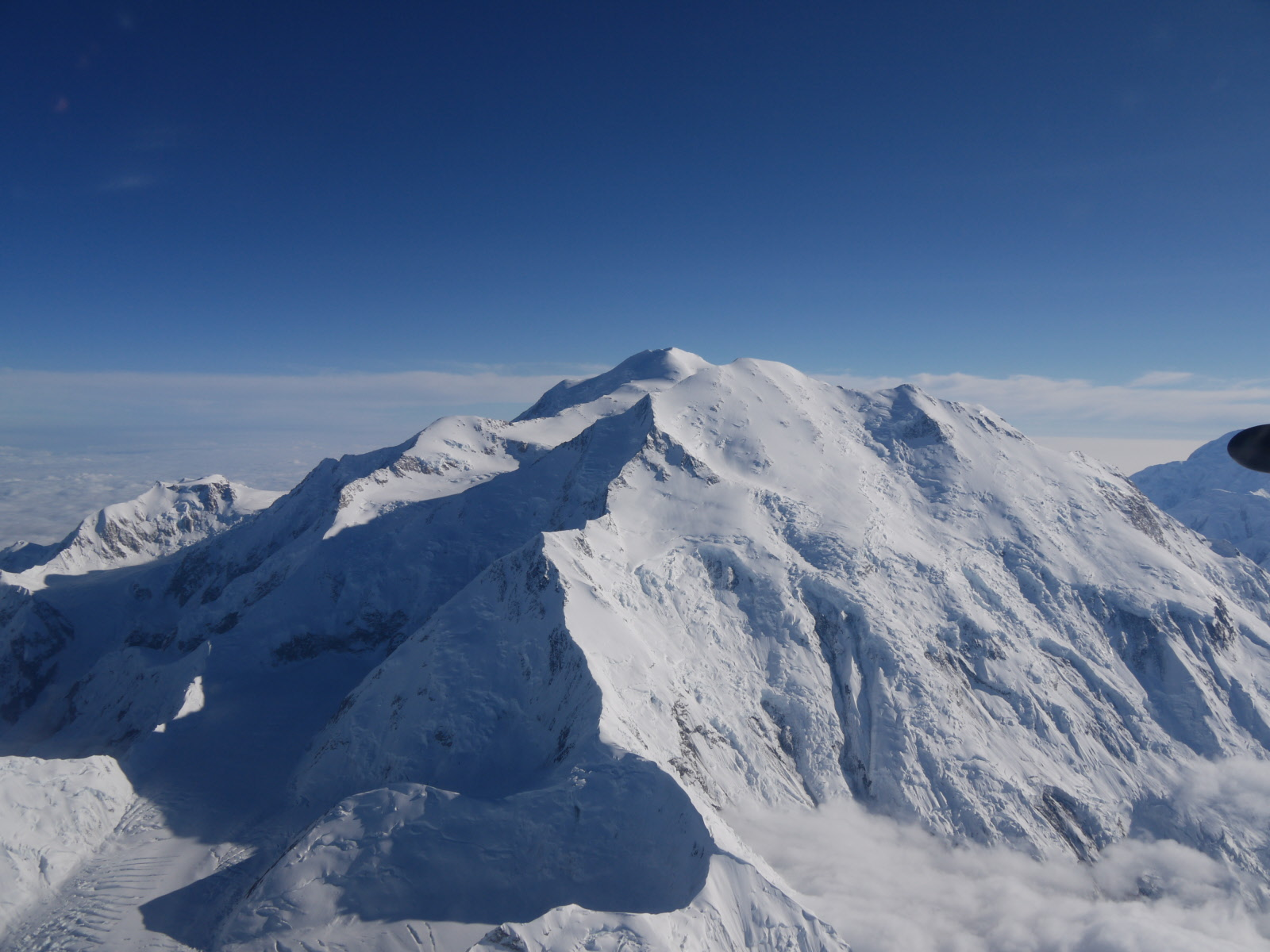
Mount Foraker is the second highest major summit of the Alaska Range.

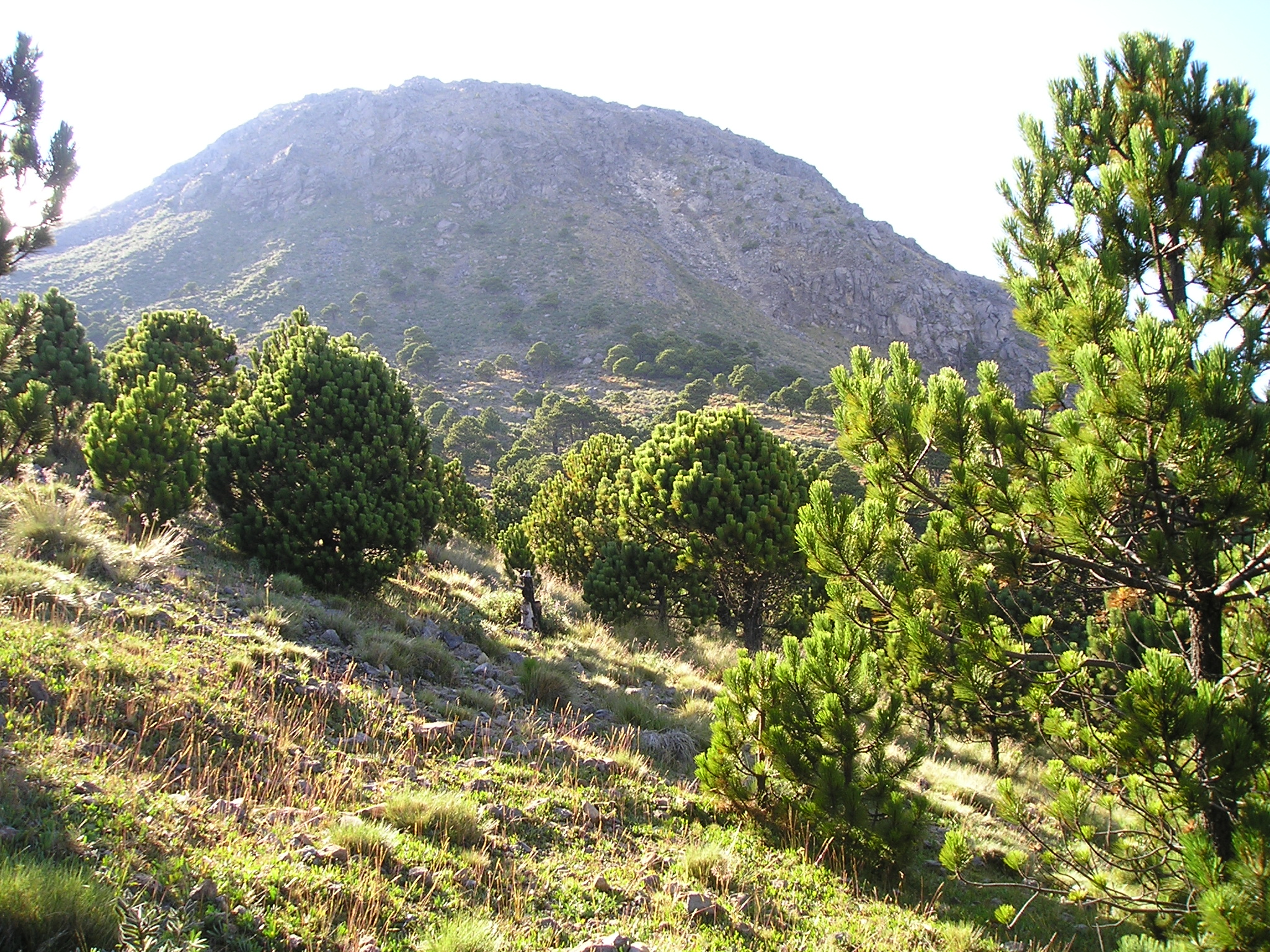
Volcán Tajumulco is the highest summit in Guatemala and all of Central America.

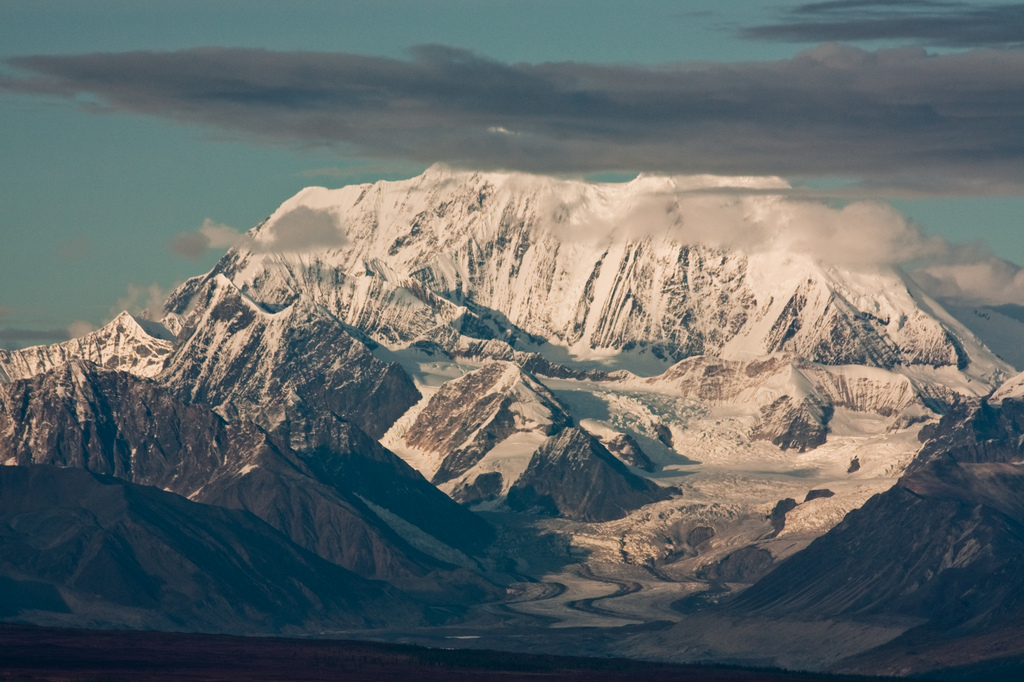
7Mount Hayes is the highest summit of the eastern Alaska Range.

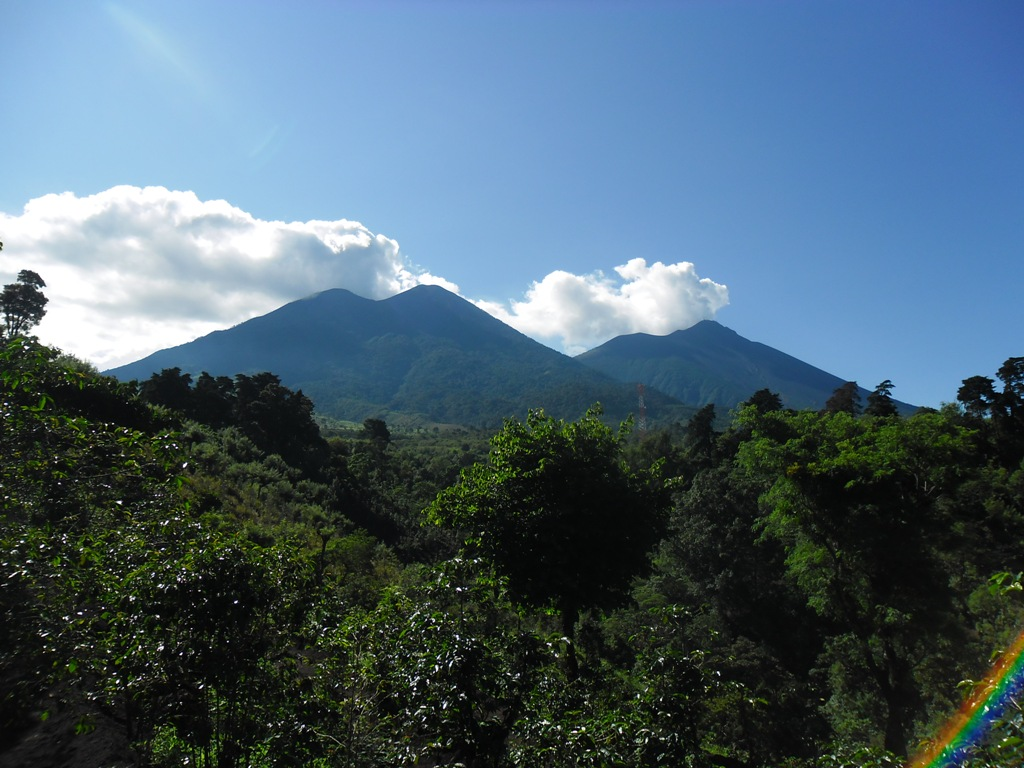
Volcán Acatenango in Guatemala.

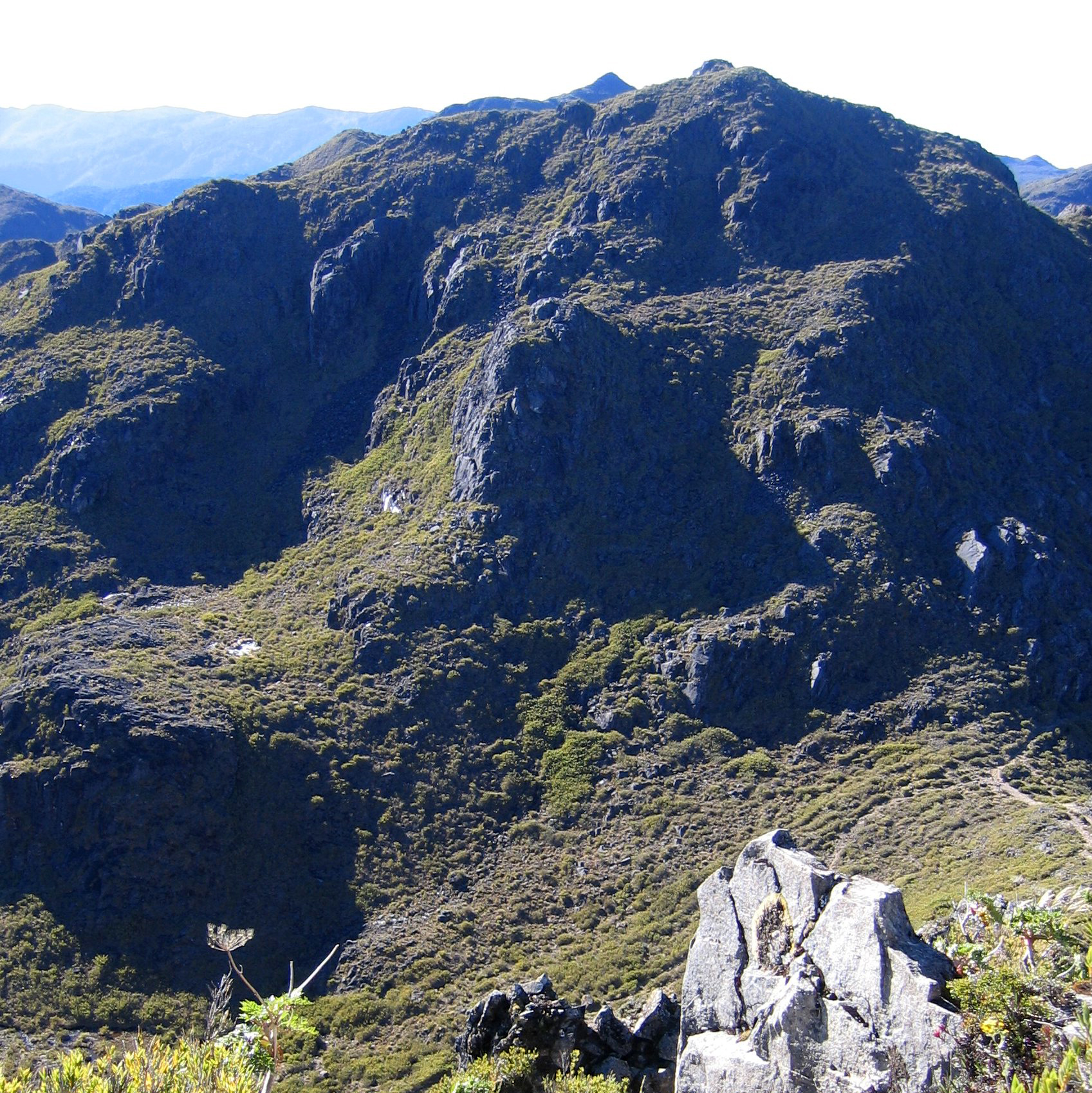
Chirripó Grande is the highest summit of Costa Rica.

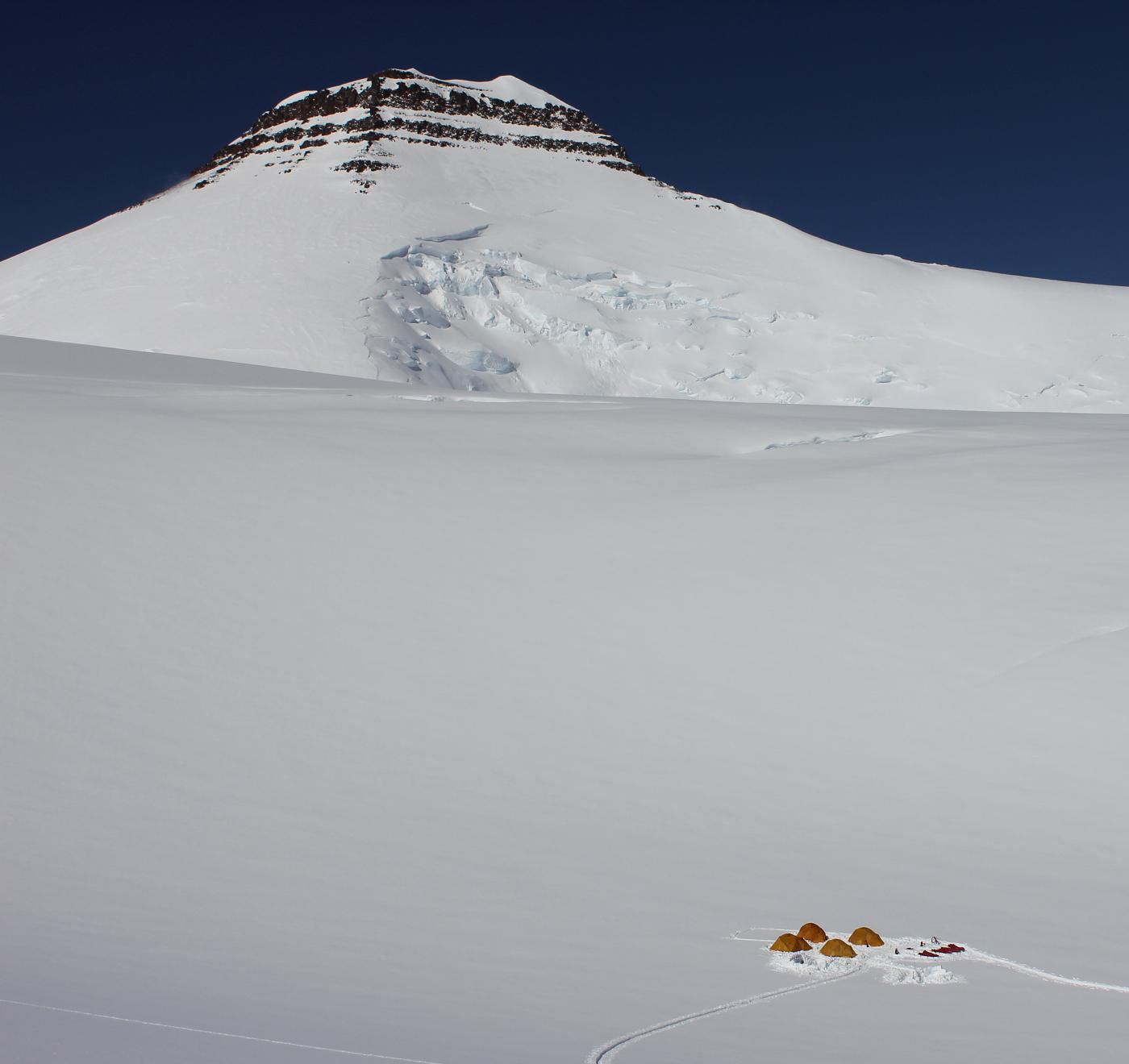
Gunnbjørn Fjeld is the highest summit of Greenland and all of the Arctic.

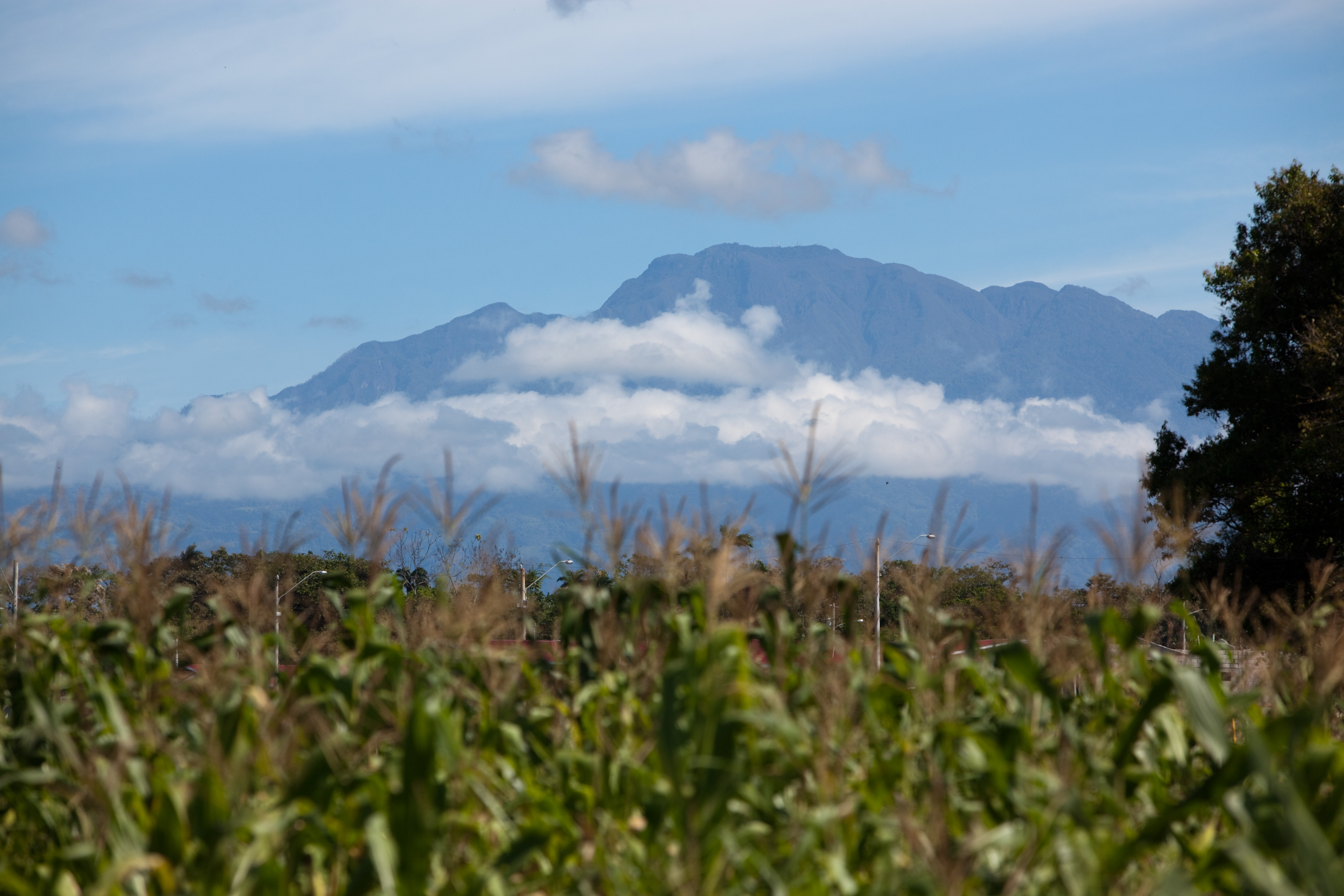
Volcán Barú is the highest summit of Panamá.

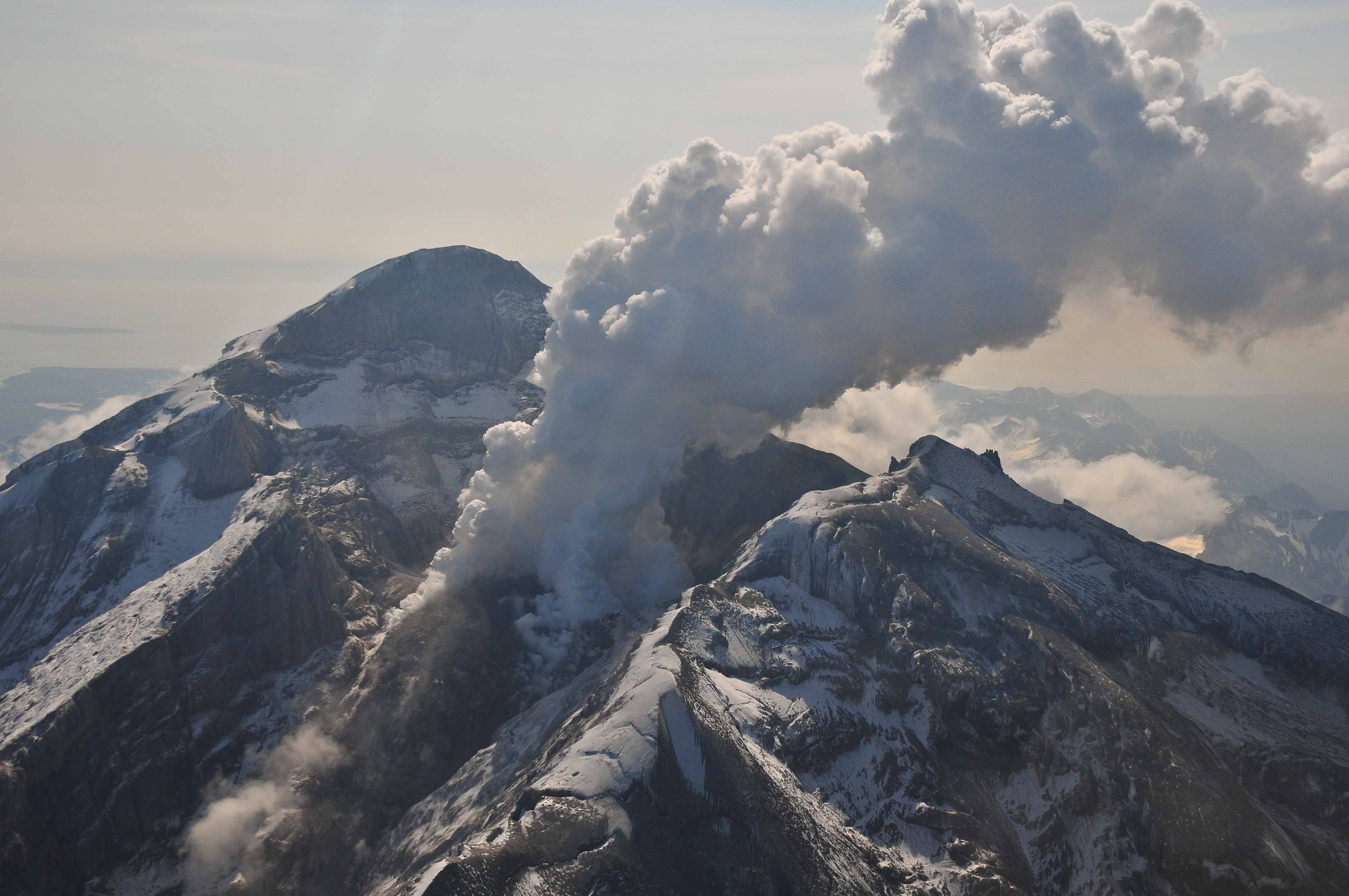
Redoubt Volcano is the highest summit of the Aleutian Range of Alaska.

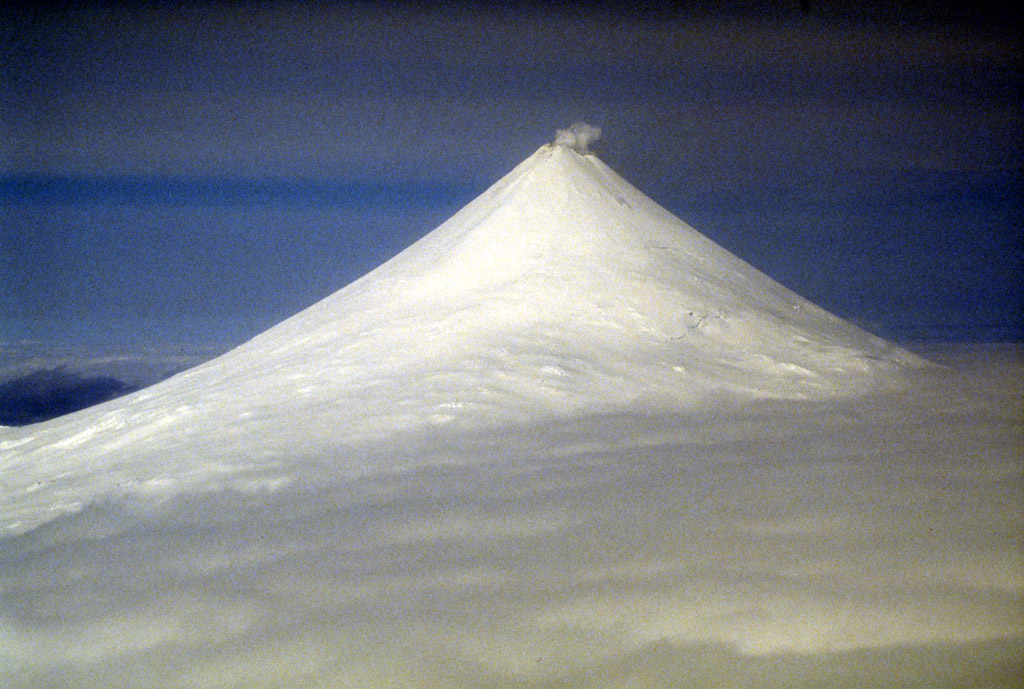
Shishaldin Volcano is the highest summit of Unimak Island and the Aleutian Islands of Alaska.

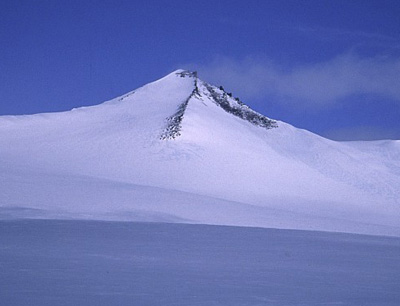
Barbeau Peak is the highest summit of Ellesmere Island and Nunavut of Canada.

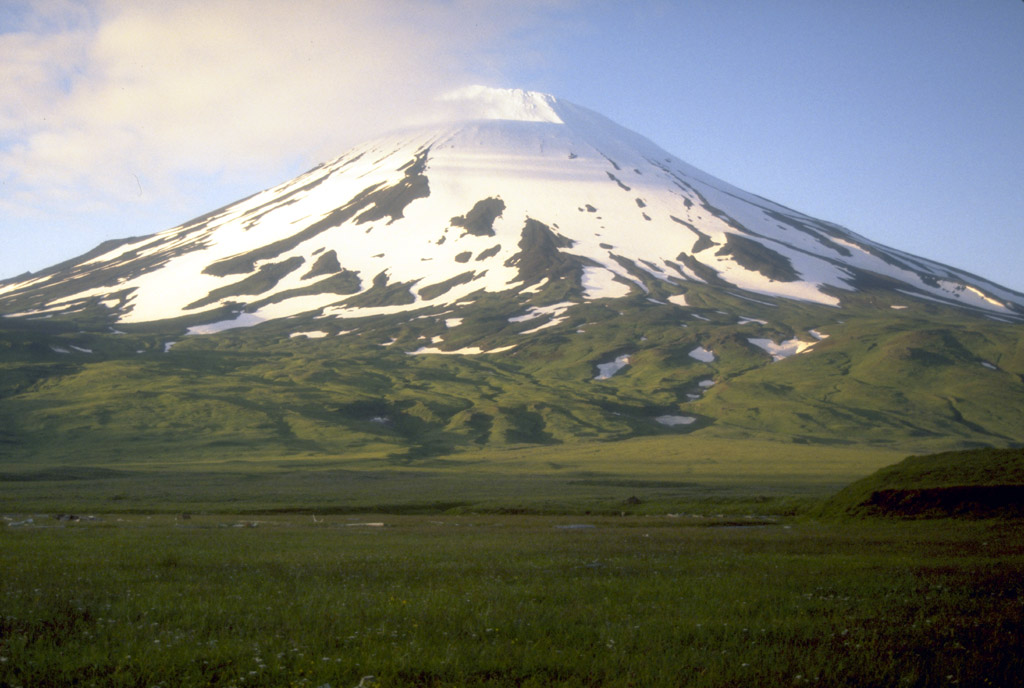
Mount Vsevidof is the highest summit of Umnak Island and the Fox Islands in the Aleutian Islands of Alaska.

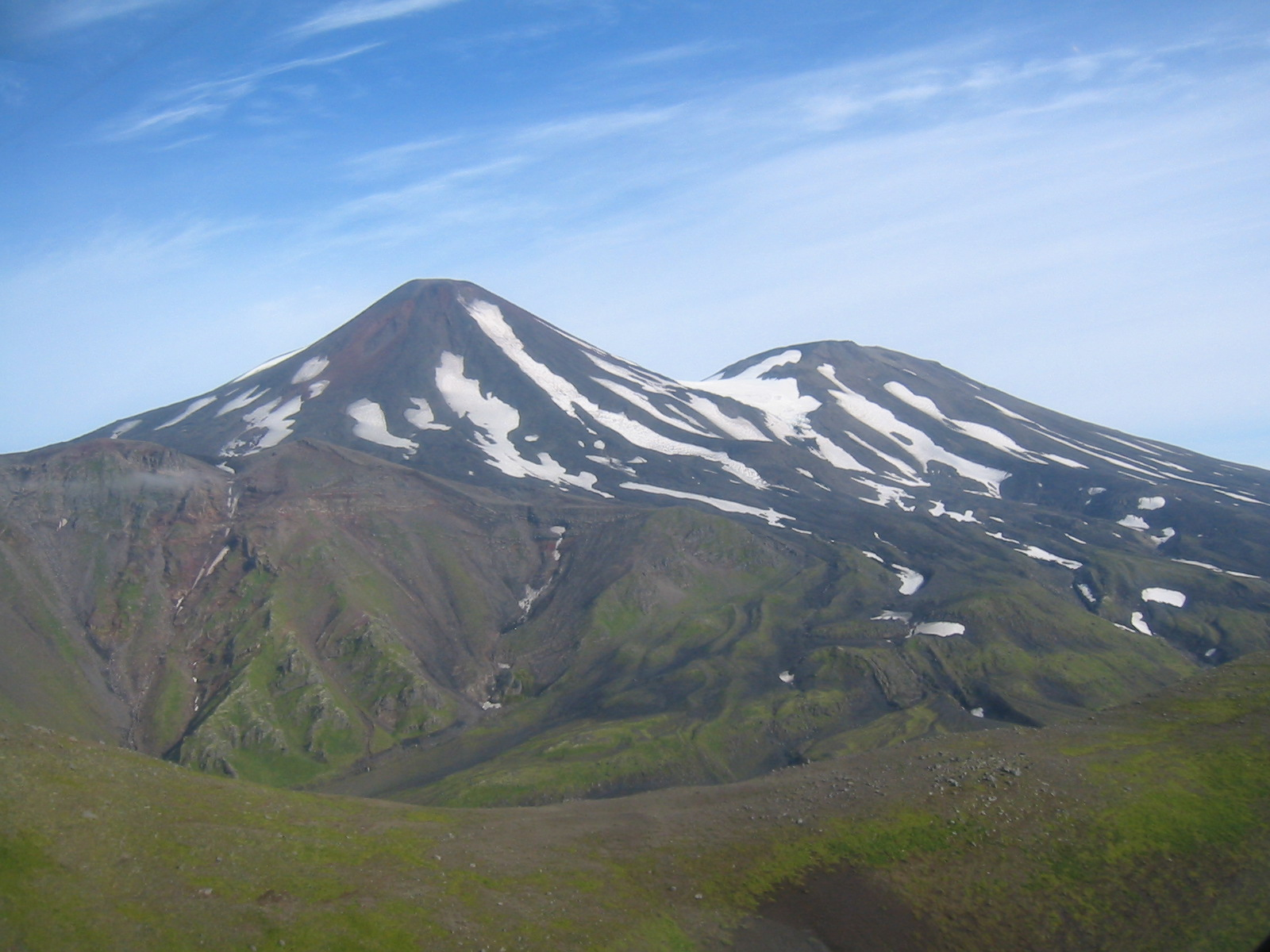
Tanaga Volcano is the highest summit of Tanaga Island and the Andreanof Islands in the Aleutian Islands of Alaska.

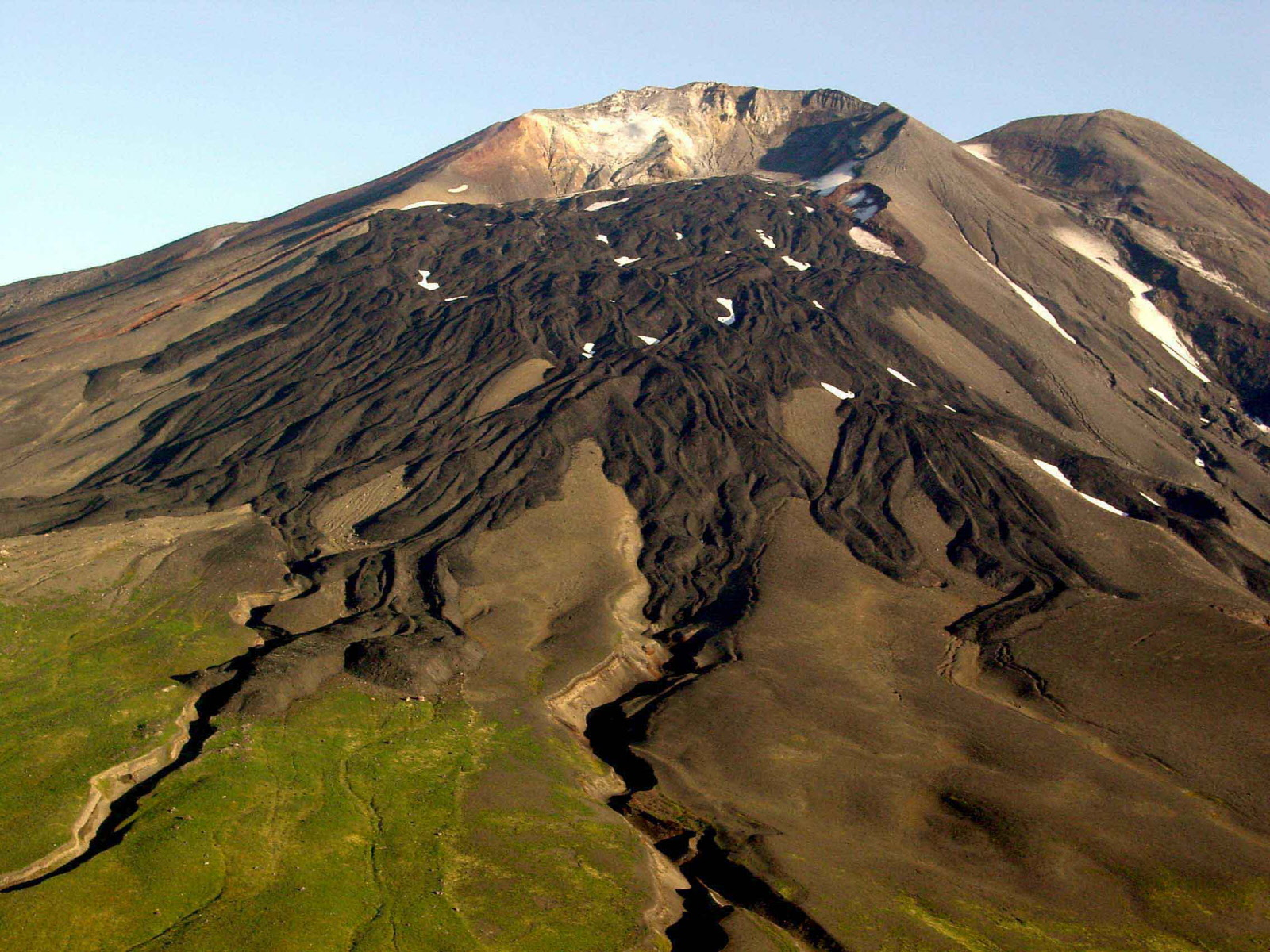
Gareloi Volcano is the apex of Gareloi Island in the Aleutian Islands of Alaska.

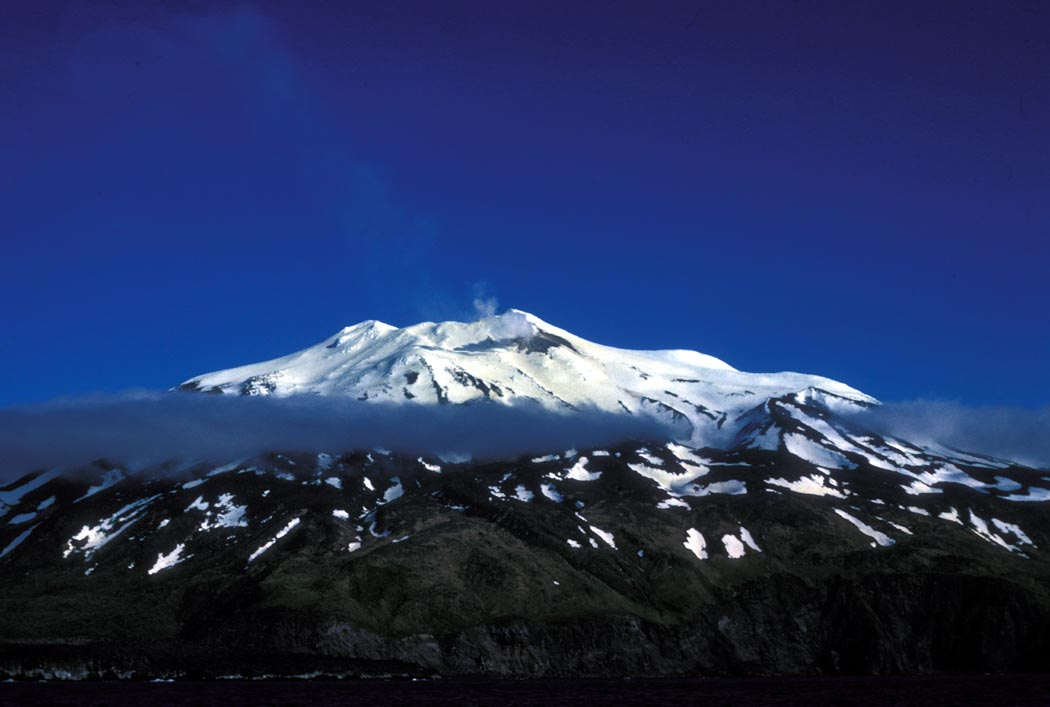
Kiska Volcano is the apex of Kiska Island in the Aleutian Islands of Alaska.

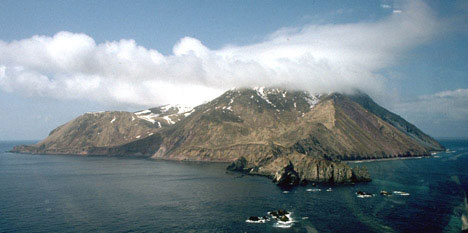
Buldir Volcano is the apex of Buldir Island in the Aleutian Islands of Alaska.

== See also ==
- North America
  - Geography of North America
  - Geology of North America
  - Lists of mountain peaks of North America
    - List of mountain peaks of North America
      - List of the highest major summits of North America
        - List of the major 5000-meter summits of North America
        - List of the major 4000-meter summits of North America
        - List of the major 3000-meter summits of North America
        - List of the highest islands of North America
      - List of the most prominent summits of North America
        - List of the ultra-prominent summits of North America
      - List of the most isolated major summits of North America
        - List of the major 100-kilometer summits of North America
      - List of extreme summits of North America
      - List of mountain peaks of Greenland
      - List of mountain peaks of Canada
      - List of mountain peaks of the Rocky Mountains
      - List of mountain peaks of the United States
      - List of mountain peaks of México
      - List of mountain peaks of Central America
      - List of mountain peaks of the Caribbean
    - Category:Mountains of North America
      - commons:Category:Mountains of North America
- Physical geography
  - Topography
    - Topographic elevation
    - Topographic prominence
    - Topographic isolation
