= List of extreme summits of the United States =

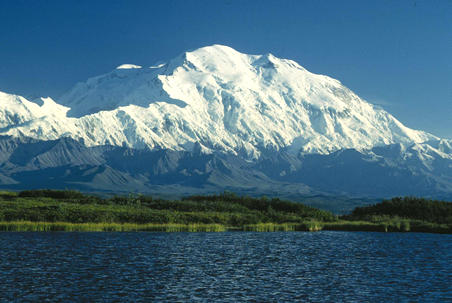
Denali in Alaska is the highest mountain peak of the United States and North America. Denali is the third most topographically prominent and third most topographically isolated summit on Earth after Mount Everest and Aconcagua.

This article comprises four sortable tables of mountain summits of the United States that are higher than any other point north or south of their latitude or east or west of their longitude in the U.S.

The summit of a mountain or hill may be measured in three principal ways:

1. The topographic elevation of a summit measures the height of the summit above a geodetic sea level.
2. The topographic prominence of a summit is a measure of how high the summit rises above its surroundings.
3. The topographic isolation (or radius of dominance) of a summit measures how far the summit lies from its nearest point of equal elevation.

== Northernmost high summits ==
The northernmost summits of their elevation in the United States
Rank	Mountain peak	State	Mountain range	Elevation	Prominence	Isolation	Location
6	Mount Chamberlin (Note: The summit of Mount Chamberlin is the highest point of the Franklin Mountains.) (Note: Mount Chamberlin is the northernmost 2000-meter (6562-foot) summit of Alaska and the United States.)	Alaska	Brooks Range	8,901 ft 2713 m	4,151 ft 1265 m	27.2 mi 43.9 km	69.2775°N 144.9107°W
5	Mount Isto (Note: The summit of Mount Isto is the highest point of the Brooks Range.) (Note: Mount Isto is the northernmost ultra-prominent summit of Alaska and the United States.)	Alaska	Brooks Range	8,976 ft 2736 m	7,901 ft 2408 m	394 mi 634 km	69.2025°N 143.8020°W
4	Hess Mountain (Note: Hess Mountain is the northernmost 3000-meter (9843-foot) summit of Alaska and the United States.)	Alaska	Alaska Range	11,940 ft 3639 m	2,490 ft 759 m	2.78 mi 4.47 km	63.6382°N 147.1482°W
3	Mount Deborah (Note: Mount Deborah is the northernmost summit of its elevation in Alaska, the United States, and greater North America.)	Alaska	Alaska Range	12,339 ft 3761 m	5,189 ft 1582 m	16.08 mi 25.9 km	63.6377°N 147.2384°W
2	Mount Hayes (Note: The summit of Mount Hayes is the highest point of the Hayes Range.) (Note: Mount Hayes is the northernmost 4000-meter (13,123-foot) summit of Alaska, the United States, and greater North America.)	Alaska	Alaska Range	13,832 ft 4216 m	11,507 ft 3507 m	125.5 mi 202 km	63.6203°N 146.7178°W
1	Denali (Note: The summit of Denali is the highest point of the Alaska Range, the State of Alaska, the United States of America, and greater North America. Denali is the third most topographically prominent and third most topographically isolated summit on Earth after Mount Everest and Aconcagua.) (Mount McKinley)	Alaska	Alaska Range	20,310 ft 6190.5 m	20,146 ft 6141 m	7,450.24	63.0690°N 151.0063°W

== Southernmost high summits ==
The southernmost summits of their elevation in the United States
Rank	Mountain peak	State	Mountain range	Elevation	Prominence	Isolation	Location
7	Mauna Loa (Note: Mauna Loa is the southernmost and westernmost 4000-meter (13,123-foot) summit of Hawaiʻi and the United States.) (Note: The shield volcano Mauna Loa is the most voluminous mountain on Earth with an estimated volume of 74,000 km^{3} (17,800 cubic miles), or enough material to fill the Grand Canyon more than 18 times.)	Hawaii	Island of Hawaiʻi	13,679 ft 4169 m	7,099 ft 2164 m	25.4 mi 40.8 km	19.4756°N 155.6054°W
6	Mauna Kea (Note: The summit of Mauna Kea is the highest point of the Island of Hawaiʻi, the U.S. State of Hawaiʻi, and all islands of the Pacific Ocean.) (Note: Mauna Kea is the tallest mountain on Earth as measured from base to summit. The shield volcano sits on the ocean floor at a depth of 5998 meters (19,678 feet) for a total height of 10,205.3 meters (33,482 feet).)	Hawaii	Island of Hawaiʻi	13,803 ft 4207.3 m	13,803 ft 4207 m	3,947.00	19.8207°N 155.4681°W
5	Mount Kaweah (Note: The summit of Mount Kaweah is the highest point of the Great Western Divide.) (Note: Mount Kaweah is the southernmost summit of its elevation in United States.) (Note: The elevation of Mount Kaweah includes an adjustment of +1.652 m (5.42 ft) from NGVD 29 to NAVD 88.)	California	Sierra Nevada	13,807 ft 4209 m	2,027 ft 618 m	10.73 mi 17.27 km	36.5261°N 118.4785°W
4	Mount Whitney (Note: The summit of Mount Whitney is the highest point of the Sierra Nevada, the State of California, and the contiguous United States.) (Note: Mount Whitney is the southernmost and easternmost summit of its elevation in United States.)	California	Sierra Nevada	14,505 ft 4421 m	10,080 ft 3072 m	2,649.47	36.5786°N 118.2920°W
3	Mount Fairweather (Note: Mount Fairweather lies on the international border between Alaska and British Columbia. The peak is the highest point of the Canadian Province of British Columbia and the southernmost and easternmost summit of its elevation in both Canada and the United States.) (Fairweather Mountain)	Alaska; British Columbia	Saint Elias Mountains	15,325 ft 4671 m	12,995 ft 3961 m	124.4 mi 200 km	58.9064°N 137.5265°W
2	Mount Saint Elias (Note: Mount Saint Elias is the second highest major summit of both Canada and the United States.)	Alaska; Yukon	Saint Elias Mountains	18,009 ft 5489 m	11,250 ft 3429 m	25.6 mi 41.3 km	60.2927°N 140.9307°W
1	Denali (Mount McKinley)	Alaska	Alaska Range	20,310 ft 6190.5 m	20,146 ft 6141 m	7,450.24	63.0690°N 151.0063°W

== Easternmost high summits ==
The easternmost summits of their elevation in the United States
Rank	Mountain peak	State	Mountain range	Elevation	Prominence	Isolation	Location
18	Katahdin (Note: The summit of Katahdin is the highest point of the Longfellow Mountains and the U.S. State of Maine.) (Note: Katahdin is the easternmost 1000-meter (3281-foot) summit of the United States.)	Maine	Longfellow Mountains	5,270 ft 1606.4 m	4,293 ft 1309 m	158.3 mi 255 km	45.9044°N 68.9213°W
17	Mount Washington (Note: The summit of Mount Washington is the highest point of the White Mountains, the State of New Hampshire, and the northeastern United States.) (Note: Mount Washington is the easternmost ultra-prominent summit of the United States.) (Note: The elevation of Mount Washington includes an adjustment of +0.02 m (0.07 ft) from NGVD 29 to NAVD 88.)	New Hampshire	White Mountains	6,288 ft 1917 m	6,158 ft 1877 m	1,318.95	44.2705°N 71.3032°W
16	Mount Mitchell (Note: The summit of Mount Mitchell is the highest point of the Appalachian Mountains, the State of North Carolina, and the eastern United States.) (Note: Mount Mitchell is the easternmost 2000-meter (6562-foot) summit of the United States.) (Note: The elevation of Mount Mitchell includes an adjustment of +0.025 m (0.08 ft) from NGVD 29 to NAVD 88.)	North Carolina	Blue Ridge Mountains	6,684 ft 2037 m	6,092 ft 1857 m	1,913.49	35.7649°N 82.2651°W
15	Emory Peak (Note: The summit of Emory Peak is the highest point of the Chisos Mountains.) (Note: Emory Peak is the easternmost summit of its elevation in the United States.)	Texas	Chisos Mountains	7,812 ft 2381 m	4,495 ft 1370 m	46.2 mi 74.3 km	29.2460°N 103.3053°W
14	Baldy Peak (Note: The summit of Baldy Peak is the highest point of the Davis Mountains.) (Note: Baldy Peak is the easternmost summit of its elevation in the United States.)	Texas	Davis Mountains	8,381 ft 2554.5 m	3,923 ft 1196 m	95.4 mi 153.6 km	30.6356°N 104.1737°W
13	Fishers Peak (Note: The summit of Fishers Peak is the highest point of Raton Mesa.) (Note: Fishers Peak is the easternmost summit of its elevation in the Rocky Mountains and the United States.)	Colorado	Raton Mesa	9,633 ft 2936.2 m	1,847 ft 563 m	31 mi 49.9 km	37.0982°N 104.4628°W
12	East Spanish Peak (Note: East Spanish Peak is the easternmost 3000-meter (9843-foot) summit of the Rocky Mountains and the United States.) (Note: The elevation of East Spanish Peak includes an adjustment of +1.372 m (4.5 ft) from NGVD 29 to NAVD 88.)	Colorado	Spanish Peaks	12,688 ft 3867 m	2,383 ft 726 m	4.21 mi 6.78 km	37.3934°N 104.9201°W
11	West Spanish Peak (Note: West Spanish Peak is the easternmost 4000-meter (13,123-foot) summit of the Rocky Mountains and the United States.) (Note: The elevation of West Spanish Peak includes an adjustment of +1.468 m (4.82 ft) from NGVD 29 to NAVD 88.)	Colorado	Spanish Peaks	13,631 ft 4155 m	3,686 ft 1123 m	19.87 mi 32 km	37.3756°N 104.9934°W
10	Pikes Peak (Note: Pikes Peak is the easternmost 14,000-foot (4267-meter) summit and ultra-prominent summit of the Rocky Mountains. Pikes Peak was the inspiration for the lyrics of America the Beautiful.)	Colorado	Front Range	14,115 ft 4302.31 m	5,530 ft 1686 m	60.6 mi 97.6 km	38.8405°N 105.0442°W
9	Blanca Peak (Note: The summit of Blanca Peak is the highest point of the Sangre de Cristo Mountains and the entire Rio Grande drainage basin.) (Note: Blanca Peak is the southernmost ultra-prominent summit of the Rocky Mountains.) (Note: The elevation of Blanca Peak includes an adjustment of +1.755 m (5.76 ft) from NGVD 29 to NAVD 88.)	Colorado	Sangre de Cristo Mountains	14,351 ft 4374 m	5,326 ft 1623 m	103.4 mi 166.4 km	37.5775°N 105.4856°W
8	Mount Harvard (Note: The summit of Mount Harvard is the highest point of the Collegiate Peaks.) (Note: Mount Harvard is the southernmost and easternmost summit of its elevation in the Rocky Mountains.)	Colorado	Sawatch Range	14,421 ft 4395.6 m	2,360 ft 719 m	14.92 mi 24 km	38.9244°N 106.3207°W
7	Mount Elbert (Note: The summit of Mount Elbert is the highest point of the U.S. State of Colorado, the Rocky Mountains of North America, and the entire Mississippi River drainage basin.)	Colorado	Sawatch Range	14,440 ft 4401.2 m	9,093 ft 2772 m	1,079.15	39.1178°N 106.4454°W
6	Mount Whitney	California	Sierra Nevada	14,505 ft 4421 m	10,080 ft 3072 m	2,649.47	36.5786°N 118.2920°W
5	Mount Fairweather (Fairweather Mountain)	Alaska; British Columbia	Saint Elias Mountains	15,325 ft 4671 m	12,995 ft 3961 m	124.4 mi 200 km	58.9064°N 137.5265°W
4	Mount Saint Elias	Alaska; Yukon	Saint Elias Mountains	18,009 ft 5489 m	11,250 ft 3429 m	25.6 mi 41.3 km	60.2927°N 140.9307°W
3	Mount Moffit	Alaska	Alaska Range	13,020 ft 3969 m	3,970 ft 1210 m	10.2 mi 16.41 km	63.5683°N 146.3982°W
2	Mount Hayes	Alaska	Alaska Range	13,832 ft 4216 m	11,507 ft 3507 m	125.5 mi 202 km	63.6203°N 146.7178°W
1	Denali (Mount McKinley)	Alaska	Alaska Range	20,310 ft 6190.5 m	20,146 ft 6141 m	7,450.24	63.0690°N 151.0063°W

== Westernmost high summits ==
The westernmost summits of their elevation in the United States
Rank	Mountain peak	State	Mountain range	Elevation	Prominence	Isolation	Location
12	Buldir Volcano (Note: The summit of Buldir Volcano is the highest point of Buldir Island.) (Note: Buldir Volcano is the westernmost 500-meter (1640-foot) summit of Alaska, the United States, and greater North America.)	Alaska	Buldir Island	2,152 ft 656 m	2,152 ft 656 m	73.8 mi 118.7 km	52.3482°N 175.9105°E
11	Kiska Volcano (Note: The summit of Kiska Volcano is the highest point of Kiska Island.) (Note: Kiska Volcano is the westernmost 1000-meter (3281-foot) summit of Alaska, the United States, and greater North America.)	Alaska	Kiska Island	4,004 ft 1220 m	4,004 ft 1220 m	85.6 mi 137.7 km	52.1027°N 177.6030°E
10	Anvil Peak (Note: The summit of Anvil Peak is the highest point of Semisopochnoi Island and the Rat Islands.) (Note: Anvil Peak is the westernmost summit of its elevation in Alaska, the United States, and greater North America.)	Alaska	Semisopochnoi Island	4,007 ft 1221 m	4,007 ft 1221 m	70 mi 112.6 km	51.9859°N 179.6021°E
9	Gareloi Volcano (Note: The summit of Gareloi Volcano is the highest point of Gareloi Island.) (Note: Gareloi Volcano is the westernmost ultra-prominent summit of Alaska, the United States, and greater North America.)	Alaska	Gareloi Island	5,160 ft 1573 m	5,160 ft 1573 m	28.6 mi 46.1 km	51.7880°N 178.7940°W
8	Tanaga Volcano (Note: The summit of Tanaga Volcano is the highest point of Tanaga Island and the Andreanof Islands.) (Note: Tanaga Volcano is the westernmost summit of its elevation in Alaska, the United States, and greater North America.)	Alaska	Tanaga Island	5,925 ft 1806 m	5,925 ft 1806 m	407 mi 656 km	51.8838°N 178.1429°W
7	Mount Vsevidof (Note: The summit of Mount Vsevidof is the highest point of Umnak Island and the Fox Islands.) (Note: Mount Vsevidof is the westernmost 2000-meter (6562-foot) summit of Alaska, the United States, and greater North America.)	Alaska	Umnak Island	7,051 ft 2149 m	7,051 ft 2149 m	223 mi 358 km	53.1256°N 168.6938°W
6	Shishaldin Volcano (Note: The summit of Shishaldin Volcano is the highest point of Unimak Island and the Aleutian Islands.) (Note: Shishaldin Volcano is the westernmost summit of its elevation in Alaska, the United States, and greater North America.)	Alaska	Unimak Island	9,414 ft 2869 m	9,414 ft 2869 m	545 mi 877 km	54.7554°N 163.9709°W
5	Haleakalā (Note: The summit of Haleakalā is the highest point of the Island of Maui and the westernmost 3000 meter (9842.5-foot) summit of the United States.)	Hawaii	Island of Maui	10,023 ft 3055 m	10,023 ft 3055 m	76.3 mi 122.9 km	20.7097°N 156.2533°W
4	Mauna Loa	Hawaii	Island of Hawaiʻi	13,679 ft 4169 m	7,099 ft 2164 m	25.4 mi 40.8 km	19.4756°N 155.6054°W
3	Mauna Kea	Hawaii	Island of Hawaiʻi	13,803 ft 4207.3 m	13,803 ft 4207 m	3,947.00	19.8207°N 155.4681°W
2	Mount Foraker (Note: Mount Foraker is the westernmost 5000-meter (16,404-foot) summit of Alaska, the United States, and greater North America.)	Alaska	Alaska Range	17,400 ft 5304 m	7,250 ft 2210 m	14.27 mi 23 km	62.9604°N 151.3998°W
1	Denali (Mount McKinley)	Alaska	Alaska Range	20,310 ft 6190.5 m	20,146 ft 6141 m	7,450.24	63.0690°N 151.0063°W

== Gallery ==
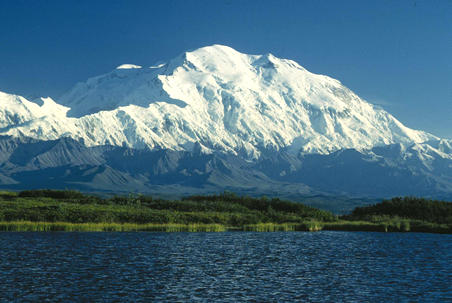
Denali in Alaska is the highest summit of the United States and all of North America.

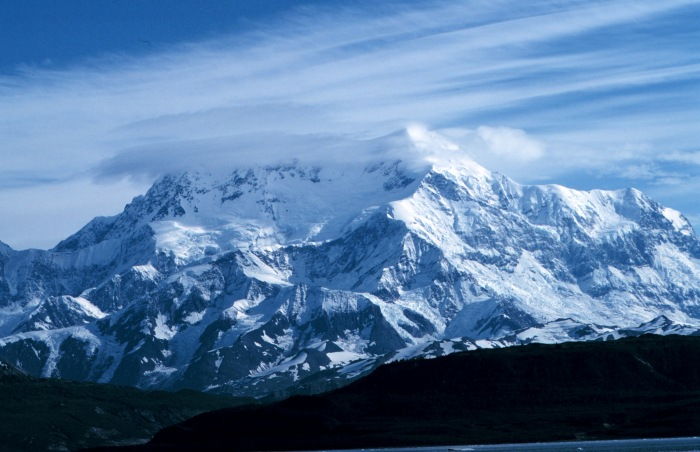
Mount Saint Elias is the second highest summit of both Canada and the United States.

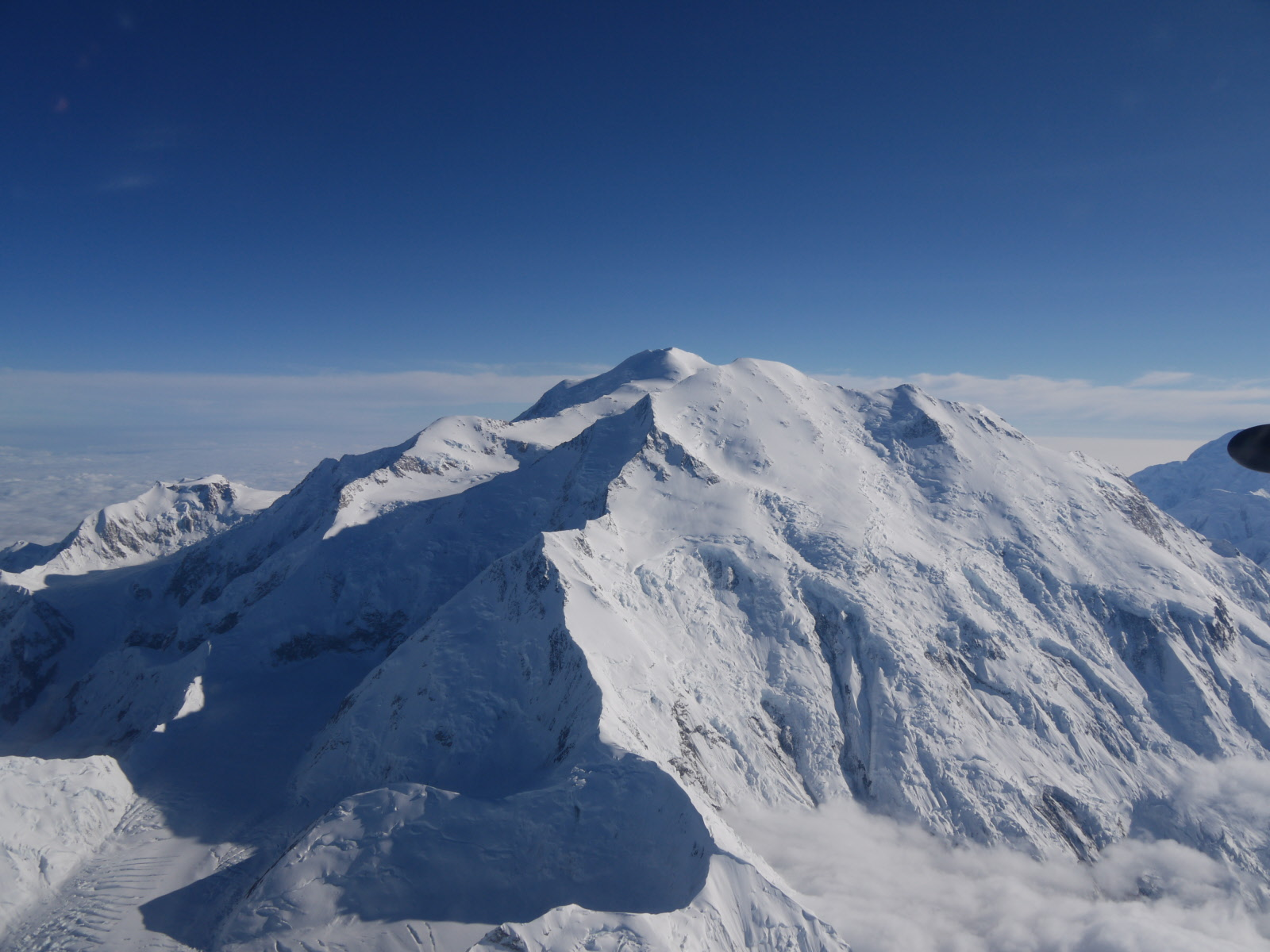
Mount Foraker is the second highest major summit of the Alaska Range.

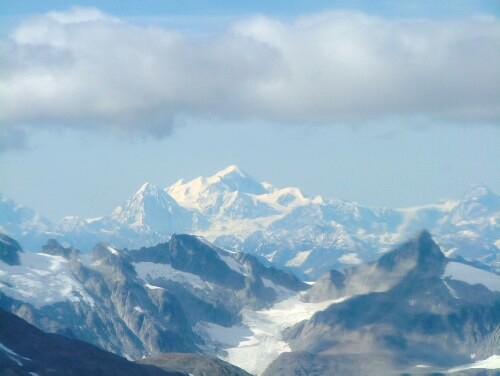
Mount Fairweather lies on the Alaska-British Columbia international border.

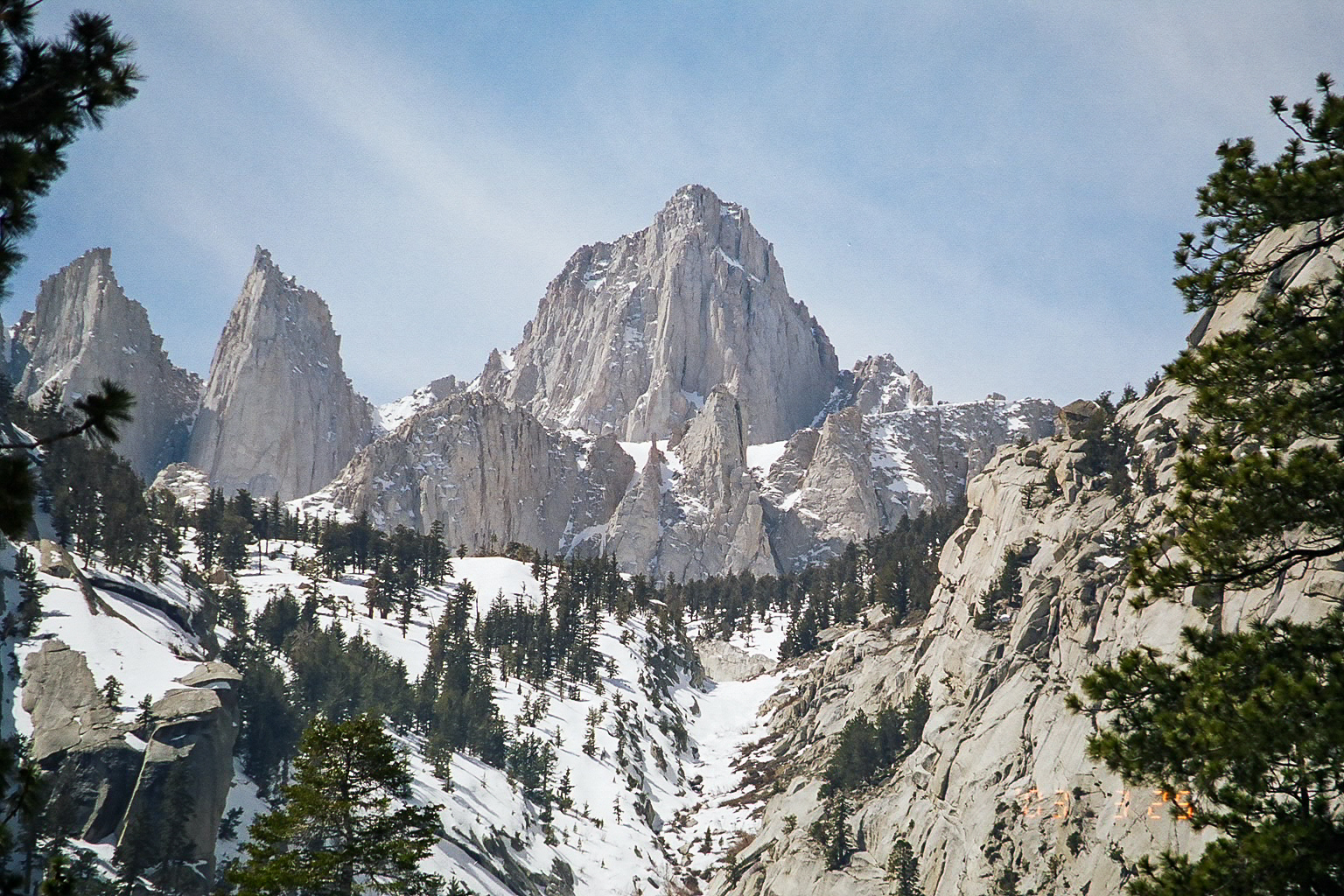
Mount Whitney highest summit of the Sierra Nevada and California.

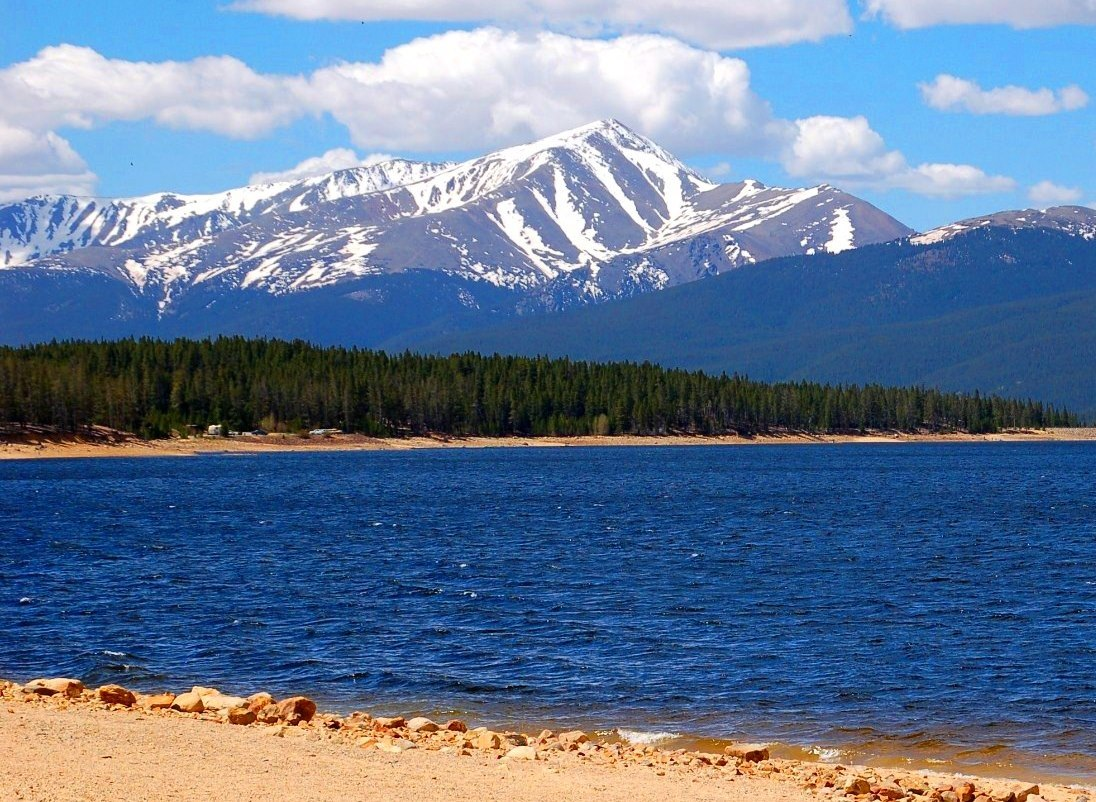
Mount Elbert is the highest summit of Colorado and the Rocky Mountains.

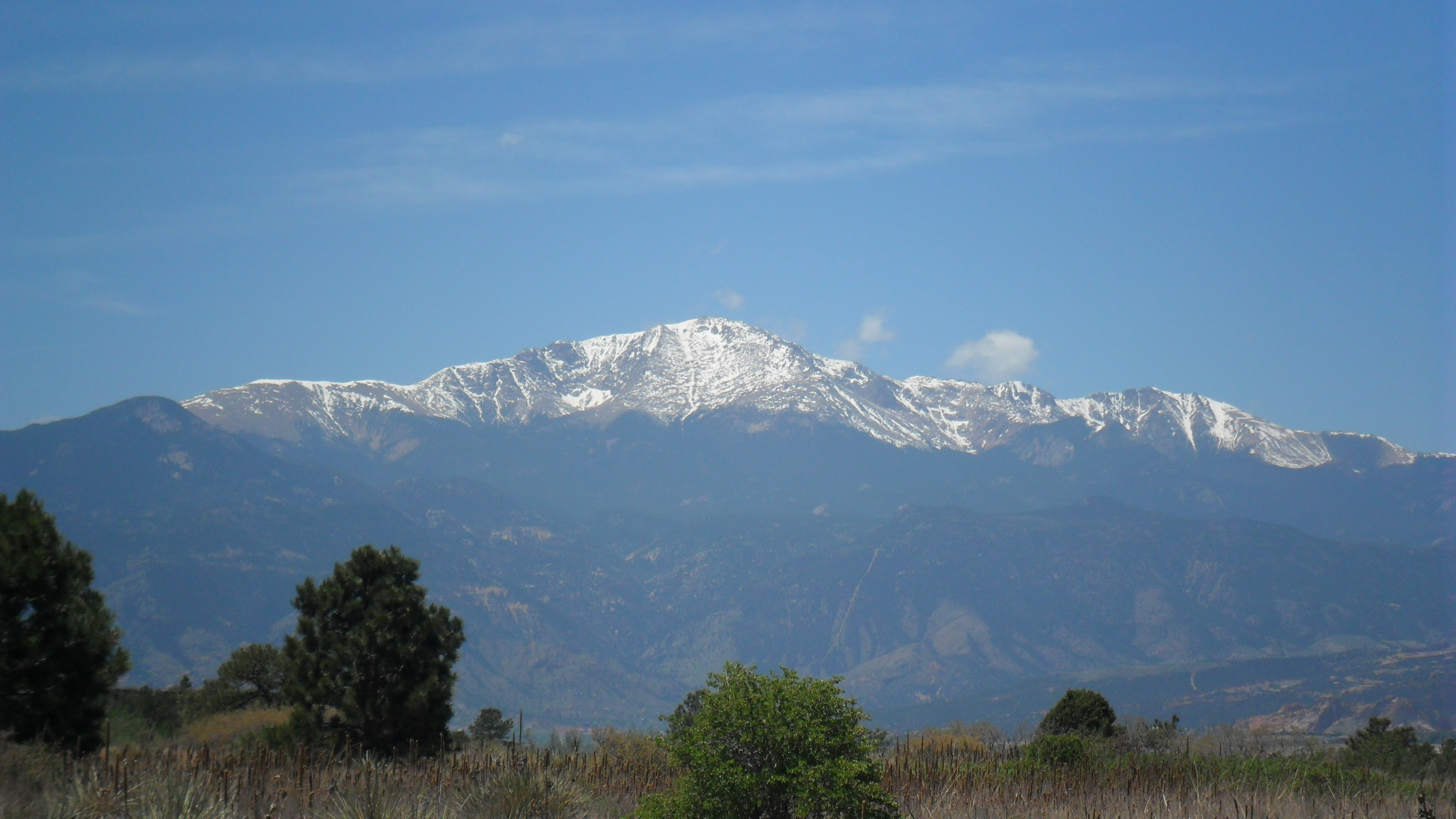
Pikes Peak in Colorado was the inspiration for America the Beautiful.

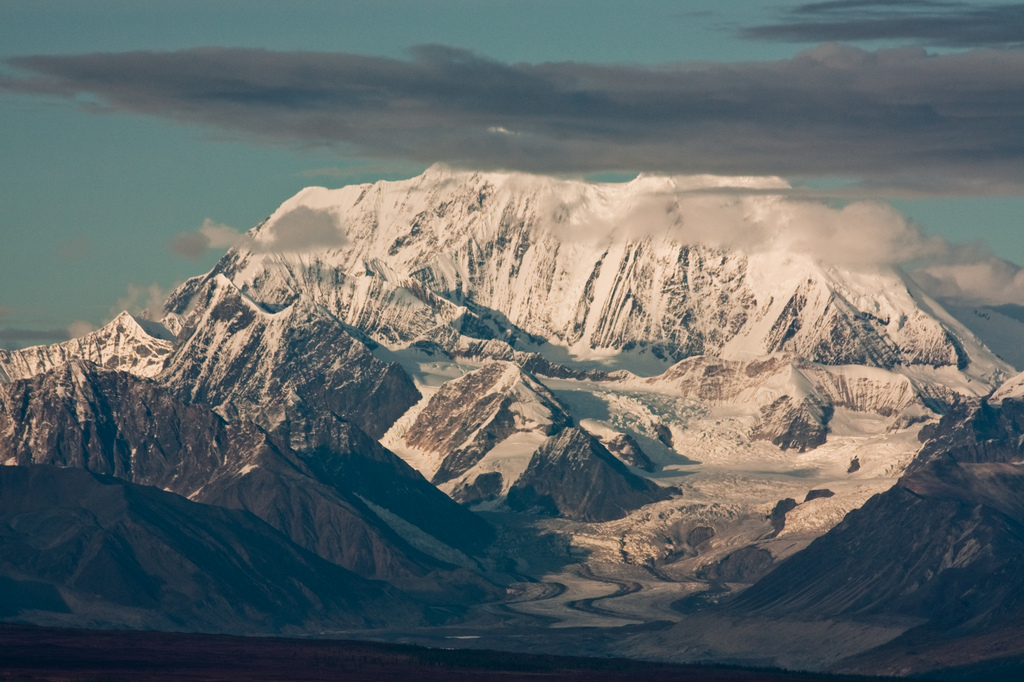
Mount Hayes is the highest summit of the eastern Alaska Range.

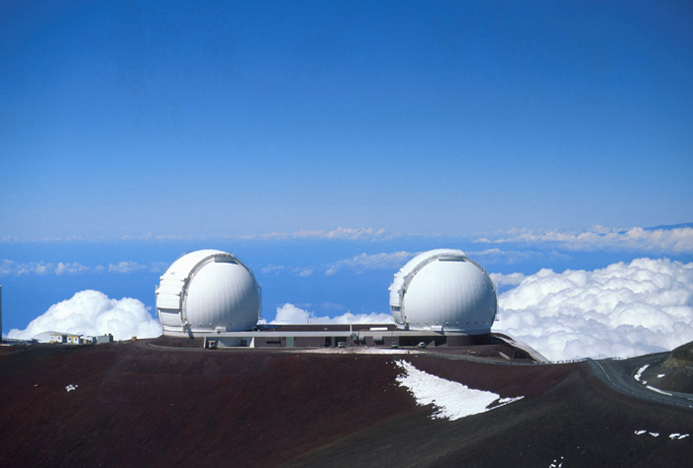
Mauna Kea on the Island of Hawaiʻi is the tallest mountain on Earth as measured from base to summit.

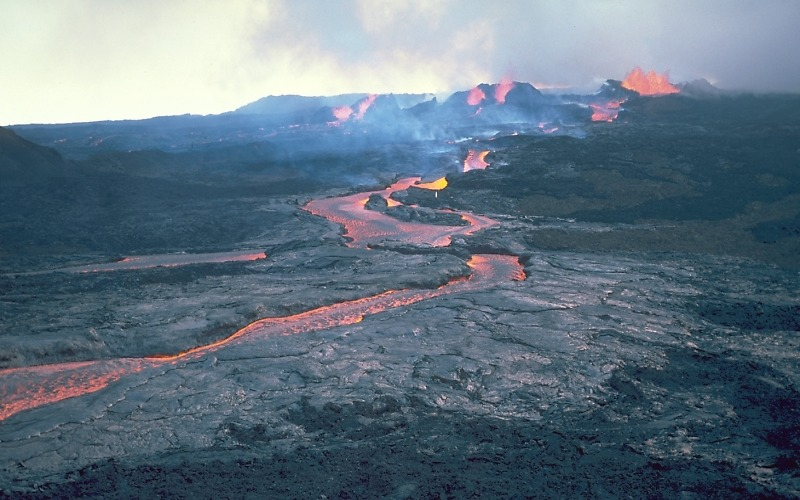
Mauna Loa on the Island of Hawaiʻi is the most voluminous mountain on Earth.

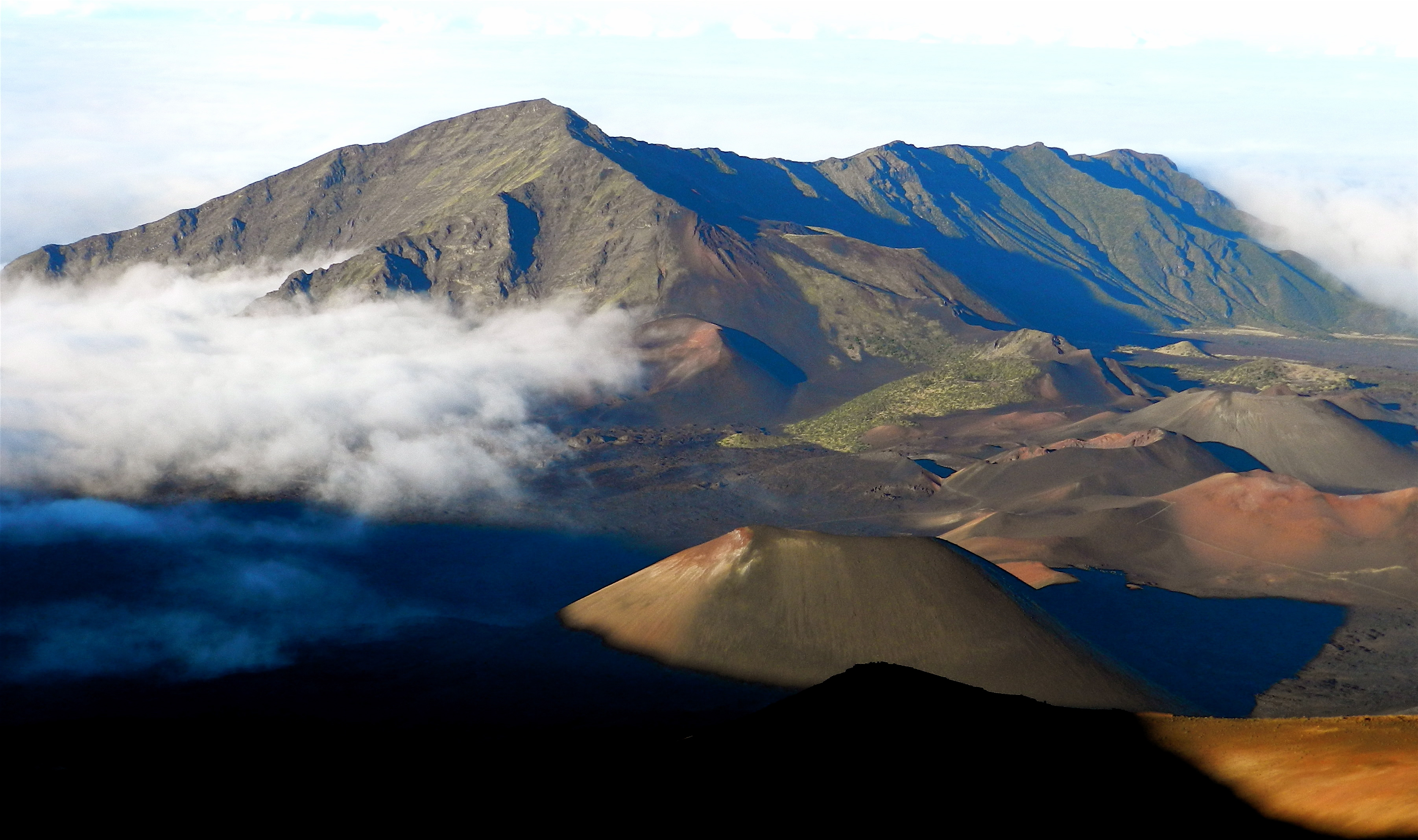
Haleakalā is the highest summit of the Island of Maui.

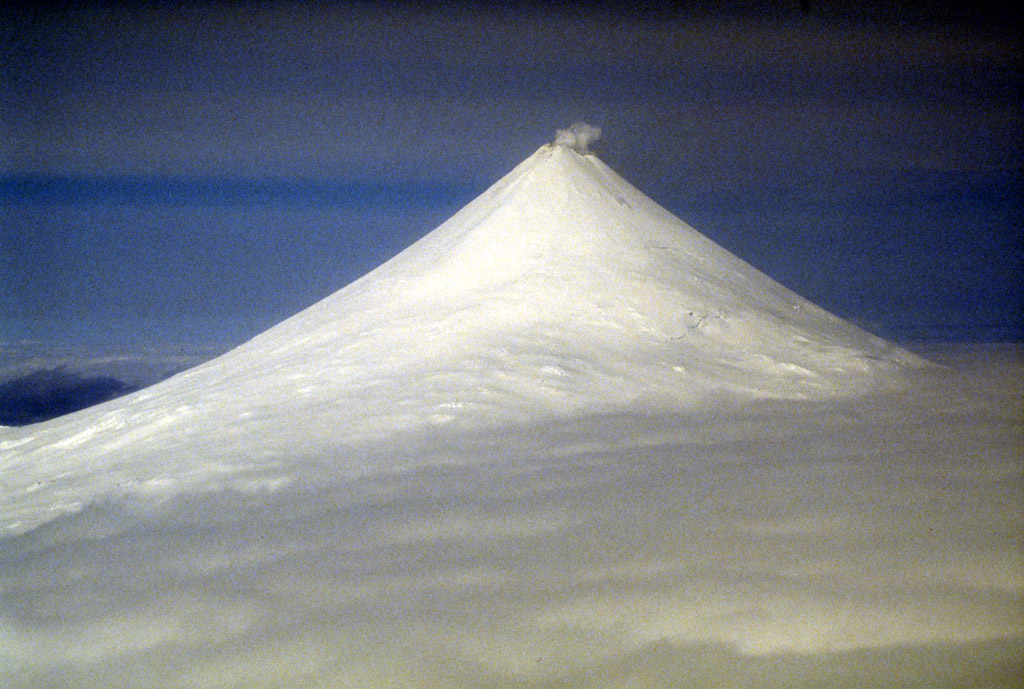
Mount Shishaldin on Unimak Island in Alaska is the highest summit of the Aleutian Islands.

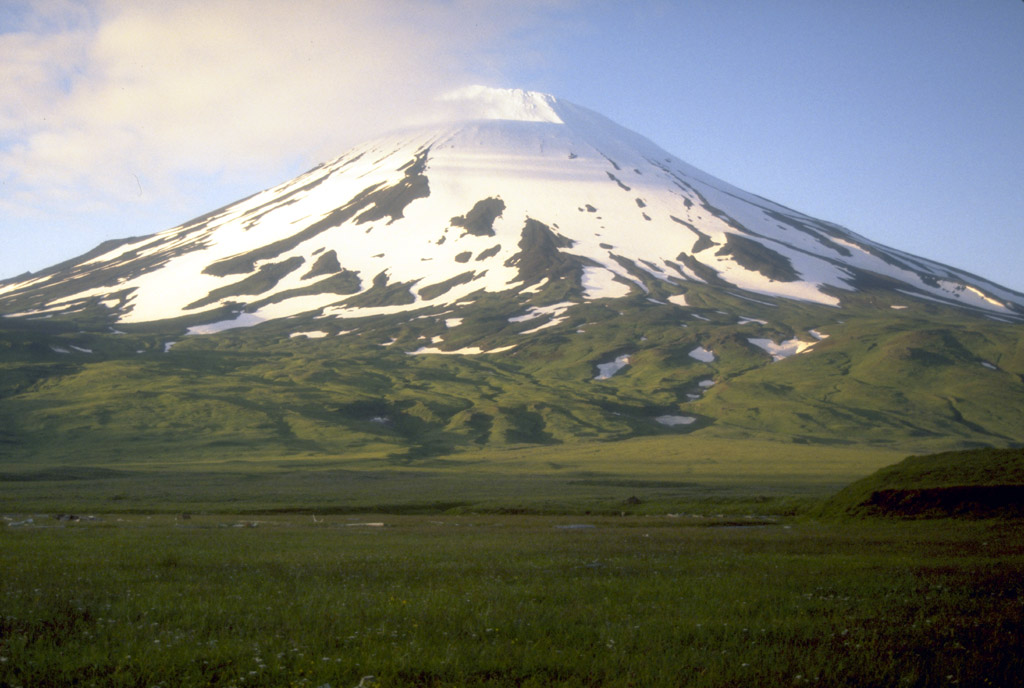
Mount Vsevidof is the highest summit of Umnak Island and the Fox Islands in the Aleutian Islands of Alaska.

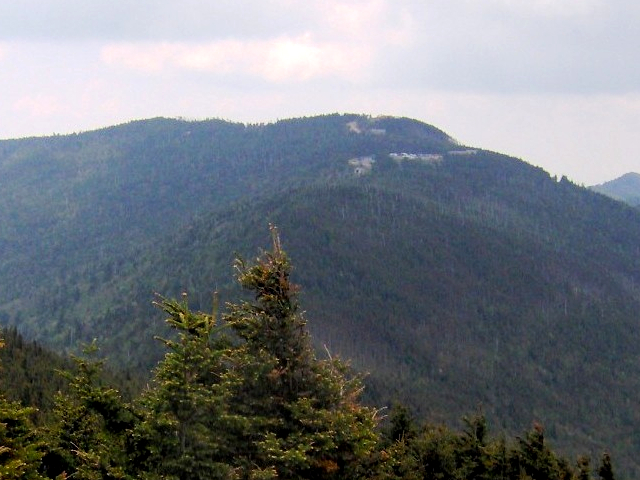
Mount Mitchell is the highest summit of North Carolina and the Appalachian Mountains.

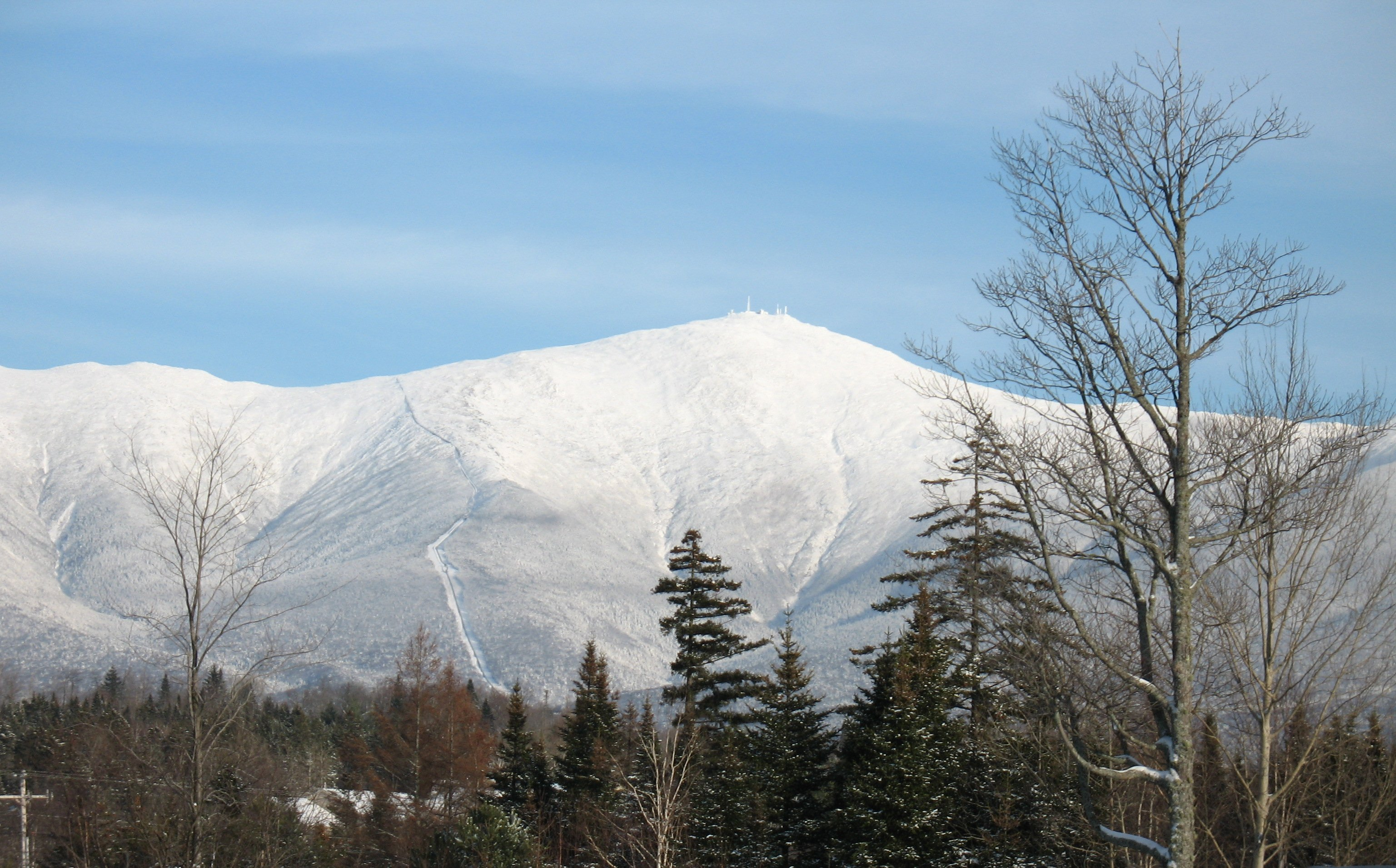
Mount Washington is the highest summit of the White Mountains and New Hampshire.

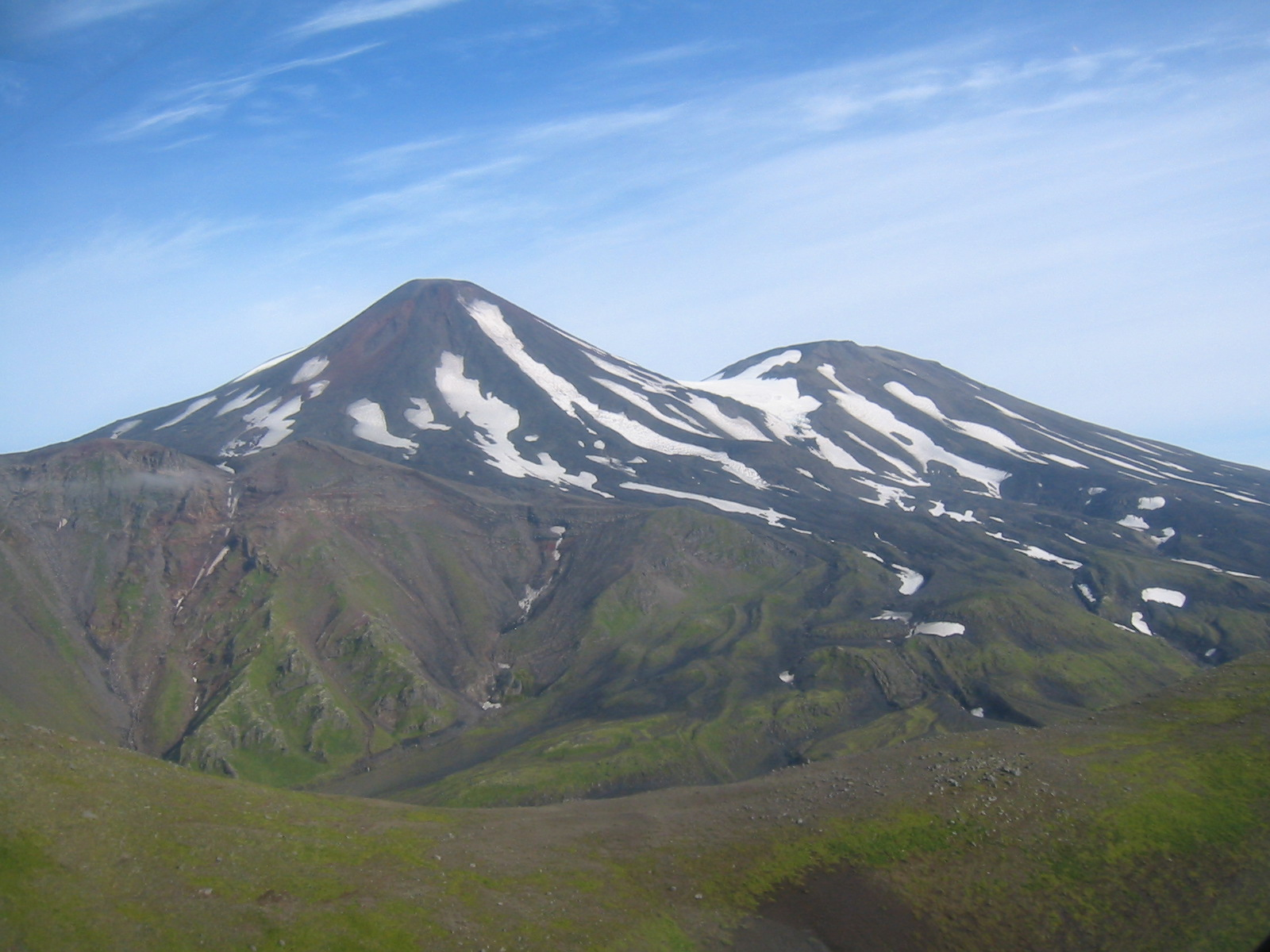
Tanaga Volcano is the highest summit of Tanaga Island and the Andreanof Islands in the Aleutian Islands of Alaska.

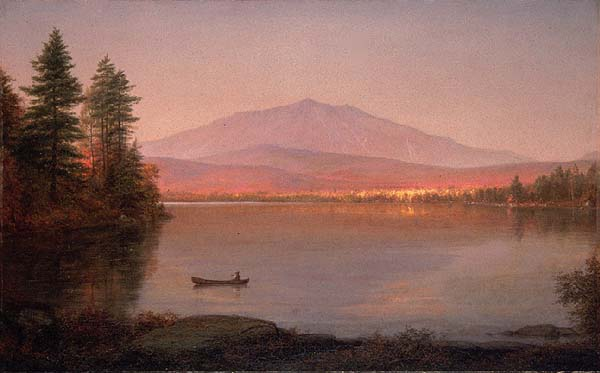
Katahdin is the highest summit of the Longfellow Mountains and the U.S. State of Maine.

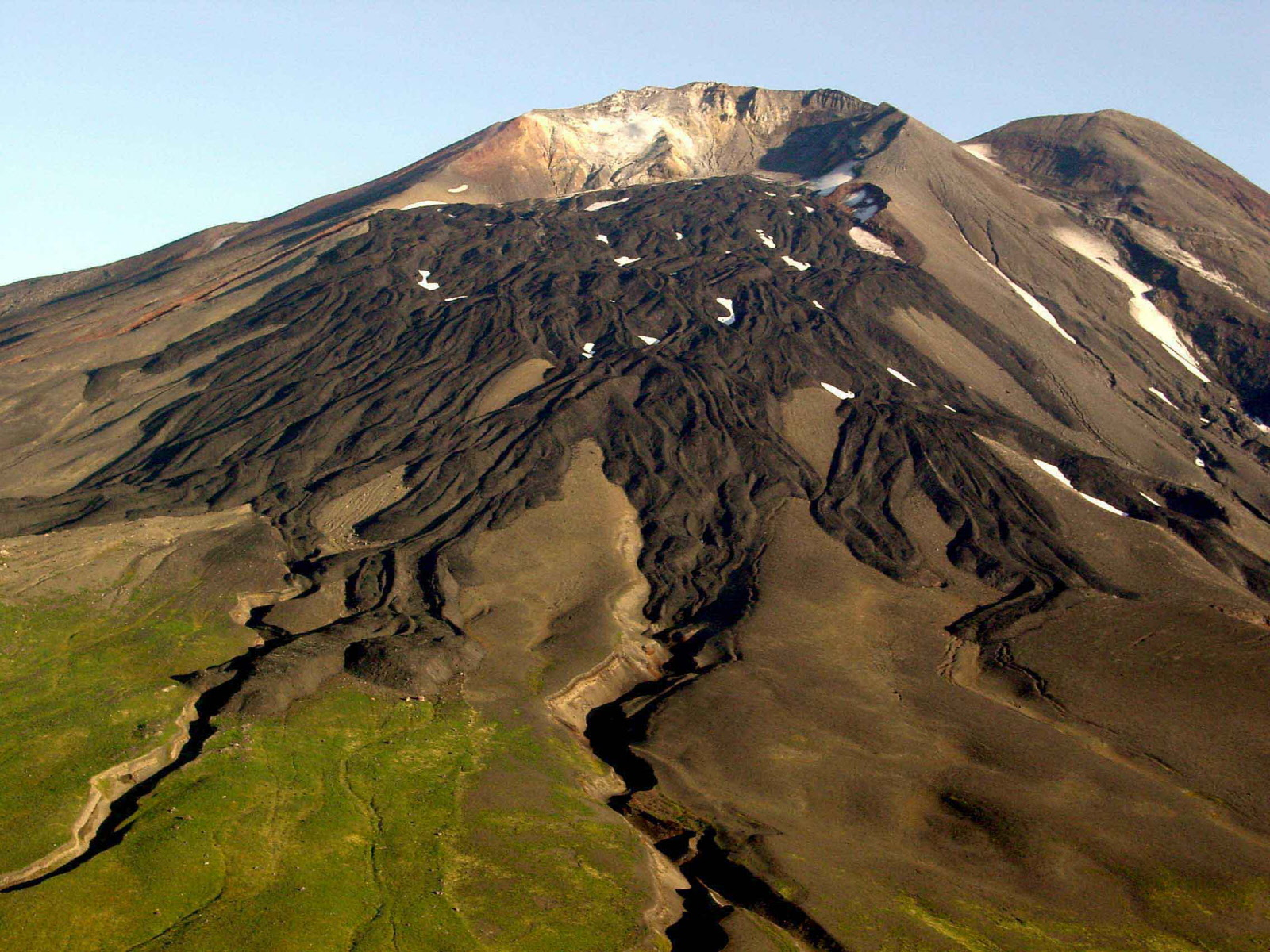
Gareloi Volcano is the apex of Gareloi Island in the Aleutian Islands of Alaska.

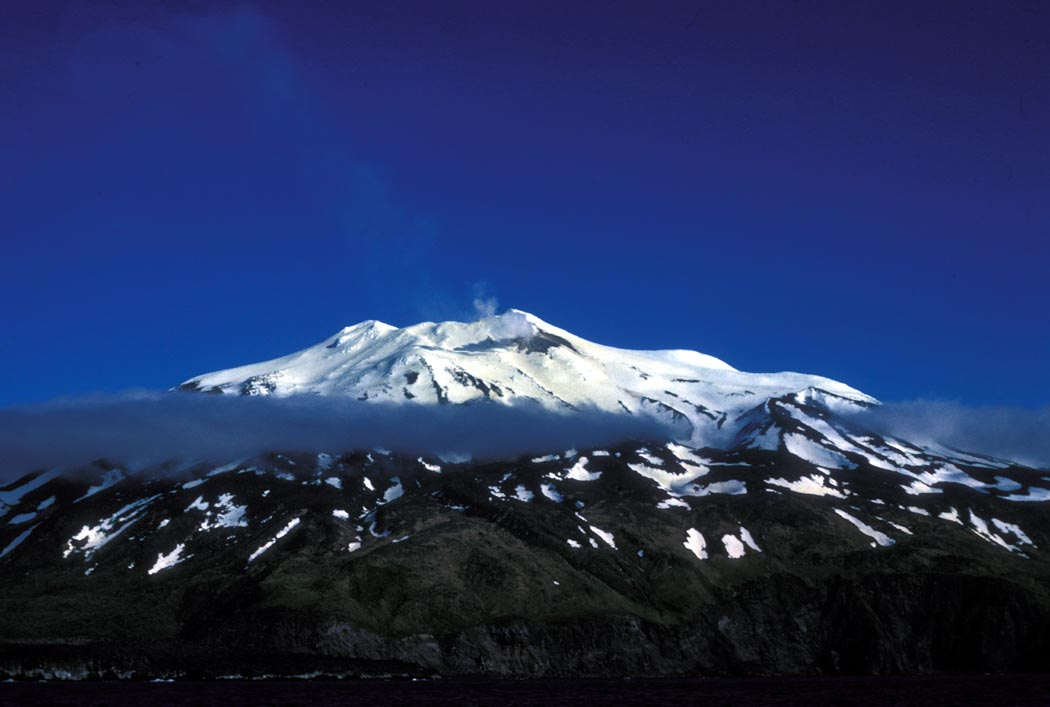
Kiska Volcano is the apex of Kiska Island in the Aleutian Islands of Alaska.

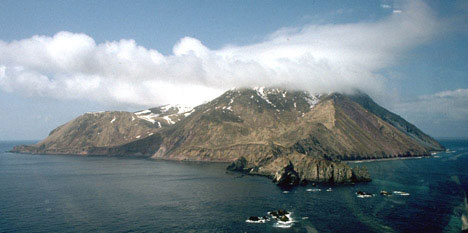
Buldir Volcano is the apex of Buldir Island in the Aleutian Islands of Alaska.

== See also ==
- List of mountain peaks of North America
  - List of mountain peaks of Greenland
  - List of mountain peaks of Canada
  - List of mountain peaks of the Rocky Mountains
  - List of mountain peaks of the United States
    - List of the highest major summits of the United States
      - List of the major 4000-meter summits of the United States
      - List of the major 3000-meter summits of the United States
      - List of United States fourteeners
    - List of the most prominent summits of the United States
      - List of the ultra-prominent summits of the United States
    - List of the most isolated major summits of the United States
      - List of the major 100-kilometer summits of the United States
    - List of extreme summits of the United States
    - List of mountain peaks of Alaska
    - List of mountain peaks of California
    - List of mountain peaks of Colorado
    - List of mountain peaks of Hawaiʻi
    - List of mountain peaks of Montana
    - List of mountain peaks of Nevada
    - List of mountain peaks of Utah
    - List of mountain peaks of Washington (state)
    - List of mountain peaks of Wyoming
  - List of mountain peaks of México
  - List of mountain peaks of Central America
  - List of mountain peaks of the Caribbean
- United States of America
  - Geography of the United States
  - Geology of the United States
    - Category:Mountains of the United States
      - commons:Category:Mountains of the United States
- Physical geography
  - Topography
    - Topographic elevation
    - Topographic prominence
    - Topographic isolation
