= Mara Mountain =

Mountain in Greenland

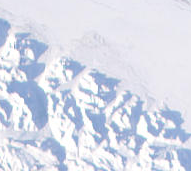
- Mara Mountain, middle center, as it appears from space.

Highest point
- Elevation: 1,155.19 m (3,790.0 ft)
- Prominence: 1,149 m (3,770 ft)
- Coordinates: 83°34′17.3″N 30°28′42.28″W

Geography
- Location within Greenland
- Location: Peary Land, Greenland
- Parent range: Roosevelt Range

Climbing
- First ascent: July 14, 1998, 3:10 am
- Easiest route: basic snow climb

Mara Mountain, in northern Greenland, is the closest known mountain to the North Pole.

== Geography ==
Located in the Roosevelt Range in Peary Land, it is approximately 446.17 miles (718.04 km) away from the North Pole. Named after Mara Boland, a horse trainer, mountaineer, and photographer from Santa Ynez, the mountain was first ascended during the American Top of The World Expedition of 1998 and was visited again in the 2003 Expedition led by Dennis Schmitt. The first climb to the summit was on July 14, 1998, in five hours by the team members of the Top of The World Expedition and it was later named Mara Mountain on July 6, 2003, in the 2003 Expedition for the northernmost island in the world. The team then had six members, including Mara Boland.

== See also ==
- List of mountains in Greenland
- Nordkrone
