= Buldir Volcano =

Volcano in the U.S. state of Alaska

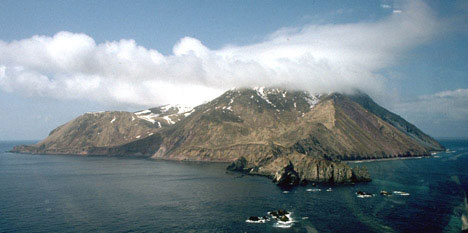
- Buldir Volcano from the east

Highest point
- Elevation: 2,152 ft (656 m)
- Prominence: 2,152 ft (656 m)
- Listing: Mountains of Alaska
- Coordinates: 52°20′58″N 175°54′34″E

Geography
- Location within Alaska
- Location: Buldir Island, Alaska, USA
- Parent range: Aleutian Islands

Geology
- Mountain type: Stratovolcano
- Rock type: Basalt, Andesite
- Volcanic arc: Aleutian Arc
- Last eruption: Holocene

Buldir Volcano is an inactive stratovolcano located on Buldir Island in the Aleutian Islands of Alaska, once described as "the westernmost volcanic center of the present Pleistocene to Recent Aleutian volcanic front." It shares the island with a younger stratovolcano named East Cape.

== Discovery and accessibility ==
After successful expeditions in 1725, 1728, and 1730, Vitus Bering was sent to explore the Bering Sea area of the Pacific in 1740. He soon settled on Kamchatka, where he started a settlement and built two additional vessels, dubbed St. Peter and St. Paul.

In 1741, Bering and his company started towards North America, but were stalled by a storm. In being delayed, they were forced to seek land. During the storm they could not make out the Alaskan coast. The storm proved too powerful so the ships turned around, charting several of the Aleutians, including Buldir Island. The island is extremely remote, leaving it totally unavailable to all but a select group of scientists. In fact, transportation through the entire area is restricted to the United States Coast Guard. Special permission is required to access the island, and for the most part only representatives from the United States Fish and Wildlife Service have the ability to obtain it. A visit to study the geology of the island was permitted in 1947 for R. R. Coats.

A skeleton was found on the island in July 1988. Further examination of the body suggested that the body was Corporal Carl Houston of Manitowoc, Wisconsin, who was last seen hiking on the isle on March 3, 1945. Along with the body were found an M-1 rifle and several spent shells.

== Geography and geology ==
The volcano's structure has changed significantly over time, from a parasitic cone to its current makeup of alumina basaltic lava flows and pyroclastic debris. A cone made of tuff tops the mountain, built over the ancient calderas of the volcano. Dating suggests that the last eruptions on the island, from East Cape, were at least 2,000 years ago, and may have possibly taken place before the Holocene.

== Flora and fauna ==
The island supports a limited variety of flora and fauna. The population of Aleutian cackling geese contributed to a re-expansion of the species, preventing their extinction.

== See also ==
- List of volcanoes in the United States

== Bibliography ==
- Wood, Charles A.; Kienle, Juergen, eds. (1990). Volcanoes of North America: United States and Canada. New York: Cambridge University Press. ISBN 978-0521438117.
