= Anvil Peak =

Volcano in Alaska, United States

- Location within Alaska

Highest point
- Elevation: 1,221 m (4,006 ft)
- Coordinates: 51°59′10″N 179°36′11″E

Geography
- Location: Aleutian Islands, Alaska, United States

Geology
- Mountain type: Volcano

Anvil Peak is a cone volcano located in Aleutian Islands, Alaska, United States.

== Etymology ==
The volcano was originally named in 1951, on a map by the United States Geological Survey. Its name was taken after a plateau located on the northern side of the volcano's main summit, taking the appearance of an anvil.

== Location ==
Anvil Peak is located on Semisopochnoi Island, in the Rat Islands of the western Aleutian Islands. It is one of the seven hills with a summit crater on the island. It is the highest point on the island as well as the highest point on all of the Rat Islands. It is located further north than any of the other hills on the island, taking up a large amount of the northern part of the island. The volcano is located 161 miles (259 km) away from Atka, 237 miles (381 km) from Shemya, and 263 miles (423 km) from Attu.

== Geology ==
Anvil Peak has two summits, which are both volcanic cones. The larger main summit is 1,221 metres (4,006 ft) tall, making it the highest point on the island. This summit is surrounded by ravines, which contain snow at certain times of the year. The peak is part of the old rim of a crater on the volcano, which had been slightly lowered due to erosion.

A plateau is located north of this summit, which is what the volcano was named after. The plateau is about 1,200 feet (370 m) wide and is almost completely flat. Six lava flows, about 20 feet (6.1 m) wide each, are located beneath this area. These flows are visible on all except one of the sides of the cliffs holding up the flat area, and had previously been located inside of the crater on the volcano. The other summit is located southwest of the main summit, and is slightly shorter.

It is not known exactly when Anvil Peak first formed, but it is believed to have formed after Mount Cerberus. According to the Global Volcanism Program of the Smithsonian Institution, its formation occurred during the late Pleistocene epoch. It has not erupted in recent times; it is thought that its last activity was probably thousands of years ago. Anvil Peak has experienced deep erosion, more so than the other cones on the islands, which is partially due to its height.
