= Buldir Island =

Island in the United States of America

Coordinates: 52°21′29″N 175°55′29″E

Location of Buldir Island in Alaska

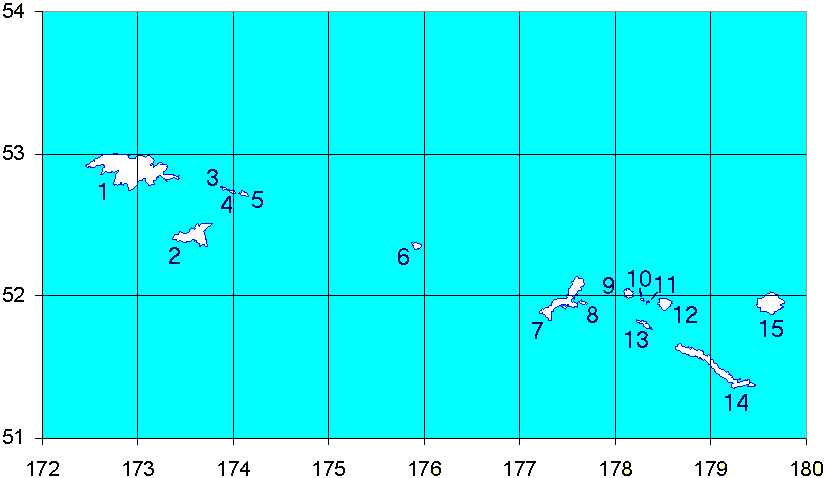
Map of the western Aleutian Islands, showing Buldir Island (6) in the center.

Buldir Island (also sometimes written Buldyr; Aleut: Idmaax; Russian: Булдырь) is a small island in the western Aleutian Islands of the U.S. state of Alaska. It is 4.3 miles (6.9 km) long and 2.5 miles (4.0 km) wide with an area of 7.4482 square miles (19.291 km^{2}). Buldir is farther from the nearest land than any other Aleutian Island. Its nearest neighbors are Kiska in the Rat Island group, 68 miles (109 km) to the east, and Shemya in the Near Island group, 64 miles (103 km) to the west. Buldir Island is uninhabited. It is part of the Alaska Maritime National Wildlife Refuge. It has been designated a Research Natural Area.

== Geology ==
Buldir is the most westerly of the Aleutian Islands, which formed as a result of volcanic activity in the late Quaternary or recent times. The rocks from which the island formed are of two different ages with a considerable time gap. The rocks of the older dome are mainly olivine basalts and the younger dome consists of hornblende basalts and basaltic andesites. This island is also likely younger than some of the neighboring islands because there are fewer species of flowering plants inhabiting it.

The two major volcanoes on the island are the Buldir Volcano, which forms most of the island, and the East Cape Volcano, which forms the island's northeast section. Buldir Volcano is the taller, reaching 2,152 feet (656 m) in height, the highest point on the island.

No harbor of any sort occurs on Buldir Island. The coast is mostly steep cliffs or boulder beaches backed by cliffs. Only one small flat area abuts a relatively gentle beach, North Bight Beach, suitable for landing small boats in good weather. It is on the northwest shore of the island. This area is the site of both prehistoric and modern habitation on the island.

== Human history ==
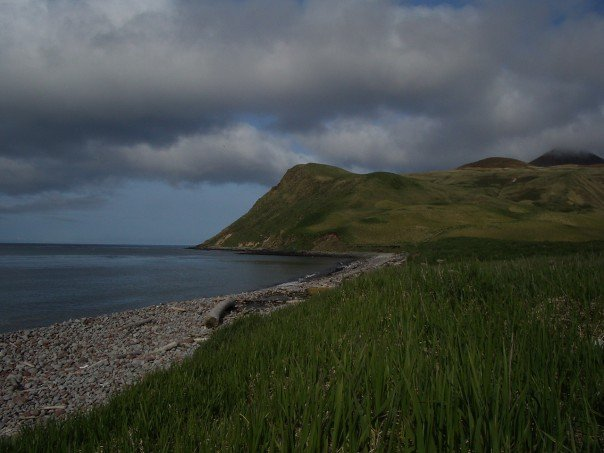
North Bight Beach, Buldir Island

Archeological evidence of human occupation on Shemya and Kiska, on either side of Buldir, dates back to at least 2000 BCE. Given the long distance between the Rat Islands and the Near Islands, prehistoric peoples likely stopped at Buldir in transit between the two larger groups, but no evidence has yet been found.

Archeologists visited Buldir in 1991, 1993, 1997, and 2001. Their research showed that prehistoric peoples lived on Buldir periodically beginning over 1000 years ago. The water-soaked clay on the island has preserved wooden and other organic artifacts unusually well, allowing scientists to carbon date the periods of occupation.

The midden on North Bight Beach was investigated, revealing much about the native diet. Bird, mammal, and fish bones were identified, ranked in order of frequency of appearance. Almost no invertebrates were found in the midden. Twenty-three species of birds were identified from their bones, 21 of which were sea birds. Mammal bones were almost exclusively those of Steller sea lions.

Among the bones found was a rib of a Steller's sea cow, a relative of modern-day manatees, which became extinct in 1768 due to overhunting by Russian fur traders. This was among the first evidence of Steller's sea cows ever found beyond the Commander Islands of Russia. The rib was carbon dated to around 400 CE.

Dating evidence suggests that human occupation of Buldir Island was not continuous. Further, its occupation was sometimes by people coming from the Near Islands, sometimes by people coming from the Rat Islands, and during some periods, by both peoples. Why early people would have risked the dangerous voyage across the open sea to reach Buldir is unclear. Archeologists speculate that resource scarcity or other turmoil in the larger island groups may have forced people to Buldir as a matter of survival. Another theory is that it was a neutral ground between the two larger island groups that allowed the two peoples to mingle.

A large house framed with whalebone was found by archeologists, dating from the mid-17th century. Some of the whales were large, suggesting they had been harvested locally by people living on Buldir. Both the size of this construction and others, and the many artifacts recovered from archeological excavations suggest that occupation of Buldir, while sporadic over the centuries, was by people who were living there rather than passing through on their way from one island group to the next.

The recorded history of Buldir Island begins with Vitus Bering's Second Kamchatka Expedition. Bering's ship, St. Peter, left Petropavlosk, Kamchatka in June 1741 and reached what is now known as Kayak Island near the mouth of Prince William Sound on July 20. Crewmen went ashore to replenish the ship's fresh-water supply. The next day, Bering began the return voyage. His hope was to arrive in Kamchatka before scurvy and winter storms proved fatal. Contrary winds and currents made for slow going along the Aleutian chain. By October 28, 1741, scurvy stalked the ship. The log for that day reports, "By the will of God Stephen Buldirev, naval cooper, died of scurvy". Later that day, "high land" was sighted in the rainy weather. Scholars believe that this was Buldir Island. The log recounts that Bering named it "St. Stephen Island", but at least as early as 1787, it appeared on Russian maps as Buldir (Булдырь). It may be that the cooper is commemorated in the island's name.

=== World War II ===
In June 1942, Japanese forces captured Attu and Kiska, to the west and east, respectively, of Buldir Island. On August 17, 1942, an America B-24 Liberator flew the first photo reconnaissance mission of the war which included Buldir. Several other reconnaissance missions were attempted in late 1942 and early 1943, both to see if the Japanese had occupied the island and to obtain weather information from the area.

After losing Attu to the Americans in battle during May 1943, the Japanese withdrew from Kiska in July 1943. They did so without the Americans' notice. Puzzlement at the Japanese disappearance led to widely reported speculation by officers of the 11th Air Force that they had sailed off on a fleet of barges to rendezvous with ocean-going transports in the lee of Buldir. In fact, the Japanese sailed eight transports into Kiska Harbor and evacuated the entire garrison under cover of fog. Buldir played no role in the evacuation.

In October 1943, Buldir was occupied by a five-man team from the U.S. Army Air Corps' 11th Weather Squadron. Two were radio operators, and three were weathermen. The detachment's job was to report hourly weather observations and also to provide local air-traffic control as an Army Airway Communication System site. Its call sign was WUUL. Given the difficulty of landing a boat on the island, the detachment was largely supplied by air drop from Kiska. The weather station on Buldir was abandoned during the summer of 1945 at the close of the war.

On March 3, 1944, Corporal Carl E. Houston walked away from the weather station and did not return. Search efforts at the time were unable to locate him. His fate remained unknown for decades. In 1988, wildlife biologists on Buldir found a skeleton still wearing Army boots with an M1 rifle by its side. Subsequent investigation by the Army Central Identification Laboratory verified that the remains were those of the missing soldier, but his cause of death remains undetermined. He was the only World War II fatality on the island.

On February 2, 1945, 1st Lt. Arthur W. Kidder Jr., a member of the 54th fighter squadron based on Attu, was test-flying a P-38 Lightning when his radio antenna broke. With low clouds in the area, he was unable to find Attu without a vector from the control tower. After a four-hour search, he spotted Buldir as he was running low on fuel and executed a wheels-up forced landing. Kidder was able to walk away from the crash with only minor injuries. Weather station personnel radioed news of his arrival, and he was picked up by a U.S. Navy vessel two days later. Kidder's wrecked plane was subsequently used for target practice by other American aircraft. In August 1994, the Aerospace Heritage Foundation of Utah, with assistance from the U.S. Air Force, recovered the wrecked P-38 from Buldir. It was restored, and is now on display at the Hill Aerospace Museum at Hill Air Force Base in Roy, Utah.

=== Postwar era ===
In October 1956, the tanker Dulcinea, carrying 285,000 US gal (1,080 m^{3}) of aviation fuel to the Northwest Airlines base on Shemya, went aground on Buldir. The vessel foundered and was lost.

The U.S. Fish and Wildlife Service has maintained seasonal biological monitoring teams on Buldir since 1988. Their primary focus is on nesting seabirds. The data they produce are an input to assessments of the regional ecosystem, which are used in fishery management. The island was the subject of a 1982 documentary titled Chain of Life: The Aleutian Islands, which was produced in conjunction with the U.S. Fish and Wildlife Service.

== Bird life ==
Buldir's remoteness and the extreme difficulty of landing a boat safely on the island gave it a unique ecological history. Neither Russian nor American fur traders thought it was worth the effort to stock Buldir with Arctic or red foxes, as was done on 190 other Aleutian islands. Since the fur traders did not land, the island also escaped introduced rats. In consequence, the ground-nesting birds of Buldir continued their lives undisturbed by mammalian predators, while on other Aleutian Islands entire species were extirpated.

Freedom from introduced predators allowed Buldir to become one of the largest and most diverse seabird breeding colonies in the Northern Hemisphere. The island is home to 4 million seabirds of 21 species during breeding season. The island's colonies include crested auklets and least auklets, as well as puffins, storm petrels, and other species. It is one of only four known locations where red-legged kittiwakes breed.

A comprehensive survey in 1975 revealed a total of 77 species on the island. As of 2019, at least 116 bird species have been reported. Due to its proximity to Asia, over 35 species of birds have been recorded on Buldir Island, which are rare in North America.

Buldir played an important part in the recovery of the Aleutian subspecies of Aleutian cackling goose, Branta hutchinsii leucopareia. This subspecies was thought to be extinct by the early part of the 20th century. The last confirmed sighting was in 1938. The birds had suffered complete breeding failure due to predation by introduced rats and foxes, which ate both eggs and goslings. In 1962, a remnant population of perhaps 300 birds was discovered on Buldir Island. These geese survived because of the lack of mammalian predators. In 1967, the bird was listed as endangered under the Endangered Species Preservation Act of 1966 and subsequently, in 1973, under the Endangered Species Act.

The recovery program for the subspecies involved capturing goslings on Buldir Island for a captive breeding program. The birds produced by this program were reintroduced to Aleutian Islands that had been cleared of foxes by teams of trappers and hunters working for the National Wildlife Refuge. The recovery plan worked and the Aleutian cackling goose was removed from the list of endangered species in 2001. By 2017, the islands had perhaps as many as 150,000 Aleutian cackling geese, most or perhaps all of them descended from the original Buldir Island population.
