= William Hammer =

William Hammer may refer to:

- William C. Hammer (1865–1930), U.S. Representative from North Carolina
- William Joseph Hammer (1858–1934), pioneer electrical engineer and aviator
- William R. Hammer, paleontologist
- William Hammer (painter) (1821–1889), Danish artist
