= Nyhavn 51 =

Building in Copenhagen, Denmark

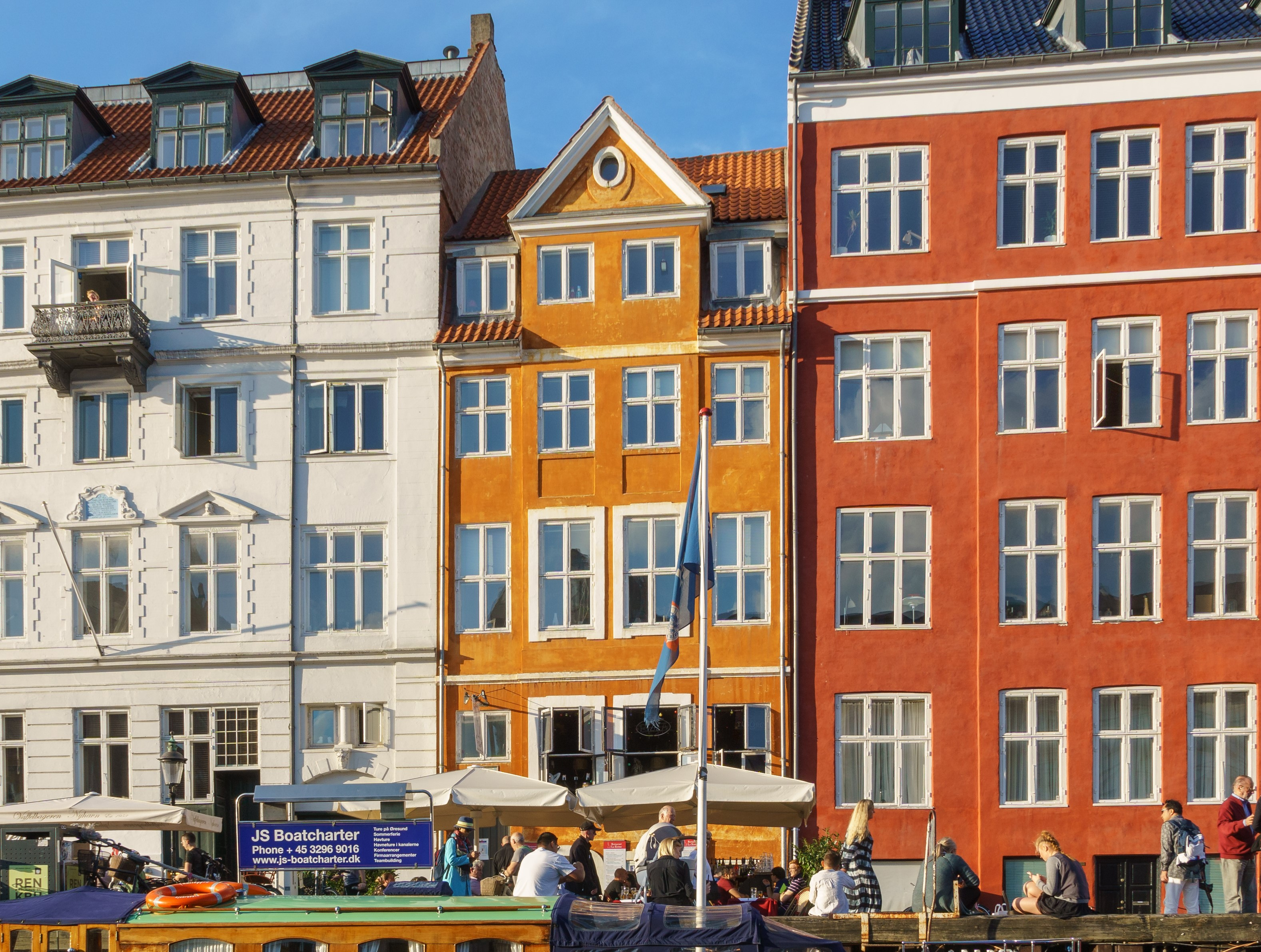
- Nyhavn 51 seen from the other side of the canal
- Interactive map of the Nyhavn 51 area

General information
- Location: Copenhagen, Denmark, Denmark
- Coordinates: 55°40′47.26″N 12°35′30.67″E
- Completed: 1766

Nyhavn 51 is an 18th-century canal house overlooking the Nyhavn canal in central Copenhagen, Denmark. Above the door is a painted stone relief depicting a lamb. The property was formerly known as Lammet (English: The Lamb) and the sign was used for identification in a time when house numbers had still not been introduced. The letters are the initials of the builder Henrich Lambertsen Engel and his wife Karen Nielsdatter Holm. The building was listed in the Danish registry of protected buildings and places in 1918. It was subject to Schalburgtage during World War II but restored. Notable former residents include the portrait painter Hans Jørgen Hammer, the marine artist Carl Frederik Sørensen and Swedish actress Eva Eklund.

== History ==
=== 17th and 18th centuries ===
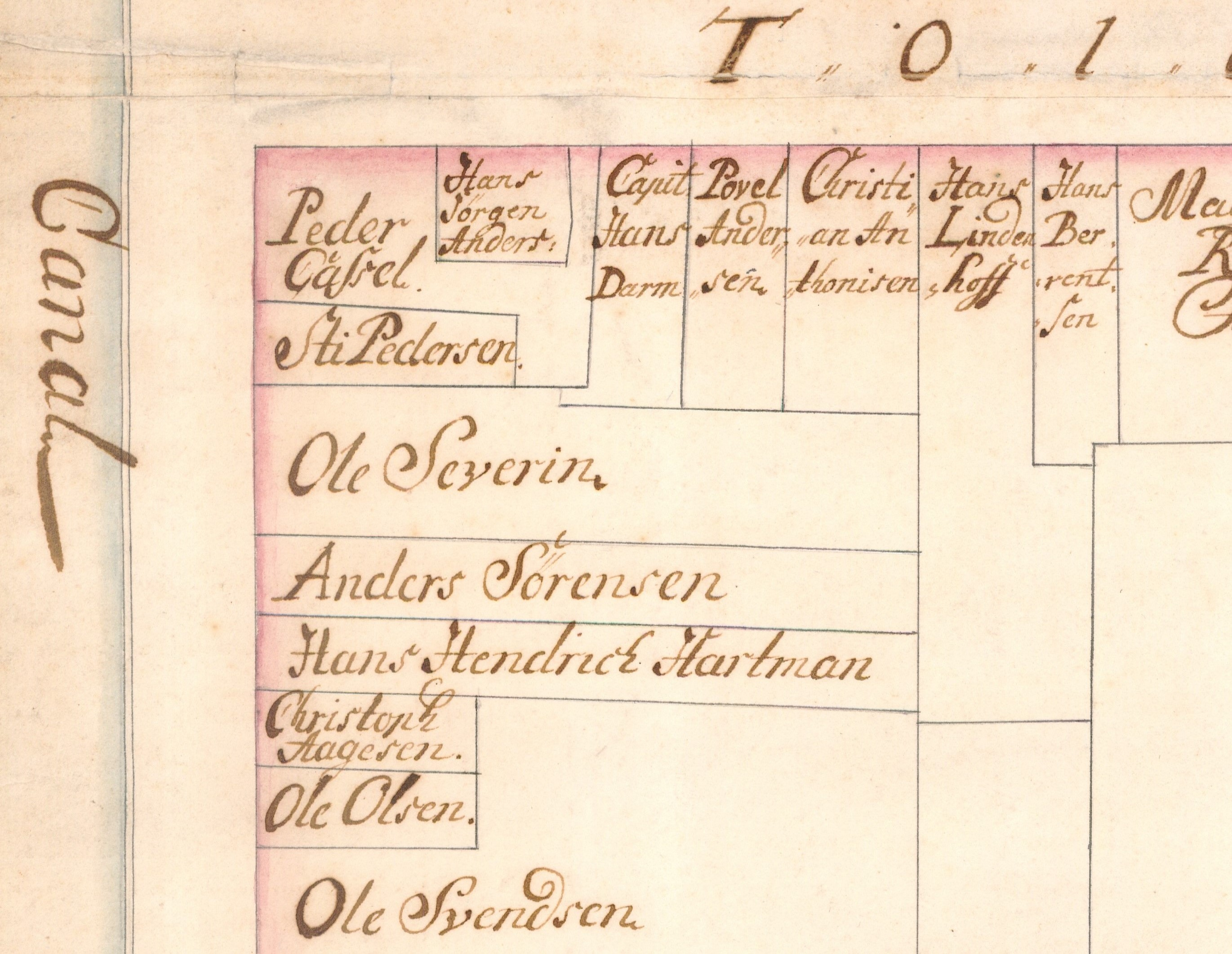
Stig Pedersen's property seen in a detail from a 1731 plan of the area

The property was listed in Copenhagen's first cadastre of 1689 as No. 16 in St. Ann's East Quarter. It was owned by cooper Peder Christensen at that time.

The property was acquired by skipper Stig Pedersen before 1731. In the new cadastre of 1756, his property was listed as No. 26 in St. Ann's East Quarter. The present building on the site was constructed for beer seller (øltapper) Henrich Lambertsen Engelin 1766.

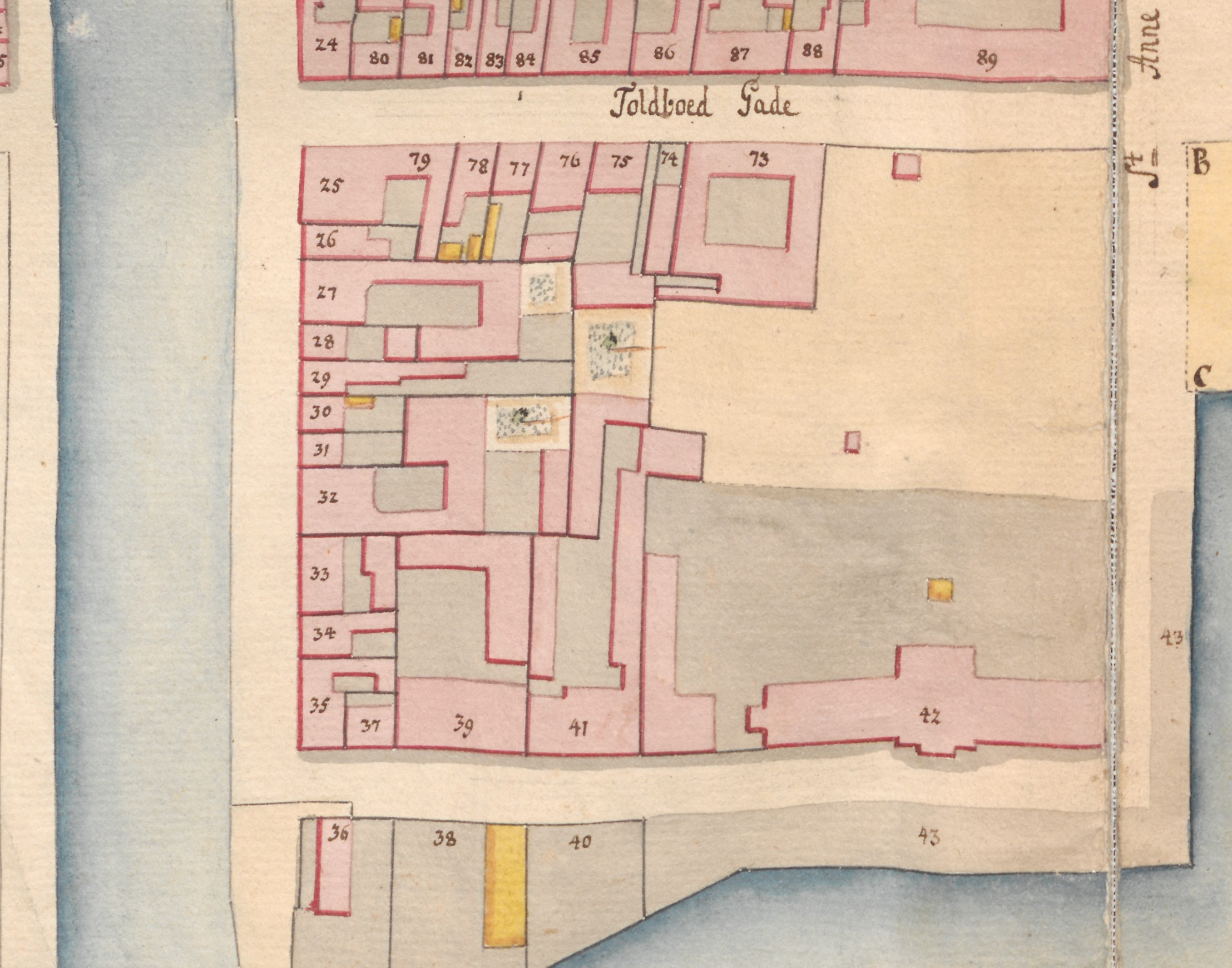
No. 26 seen in a detail from Christian Gedde's map of St. Ann's East Quarter, 1757

No. 26 was home to three households at the 1787 census. Maria Smith, a 73-year-old widow, resided in the building with her son Andreas Smith and a maid. The son worked for the Danish Asiatic Company. Friederich Hesselberg, a skipper, resided in the building with his wife Helena, their two children (aged one and two), two maids and four lodgers. Jens Knudsen, a sail-maker, resided in the building with his wife Lucie Arth, their three-year-old son, a 16-year-old daughter from his first marriage and a maid.

=== Peter Marcussen ===
The property was later acquired by skipper Peter Marcussen. His property was home to five households at the 1801 census. The owner resided in the building with his wife Johanne Steensdatter, their two-year-old son Rasmus Marcussen, four children from the wife's first marriage (aged three to 14) and one maid. Lauritz Mathiesen, another skipper, resided in the building with his wife Juliane Larsdatter, their one-year-old son and a maid. Christen Steensen, a third skipper, was also among the residents. Christian Gotfried Jørgensen, a fourth skipper, resided in the building with his wife Karen Hansdatter and their one-year-old son. Hans Peter Lunding, a former stadsbetjent, resided in the building with his wife Kirstine Christensdatter, their three children (aged 14 to 20) and one maid.

The property was again listed as No. 26 in the new cadastre of 1806. It was still owned by Peter Marcussen at that time.

=== Grønbech family ===
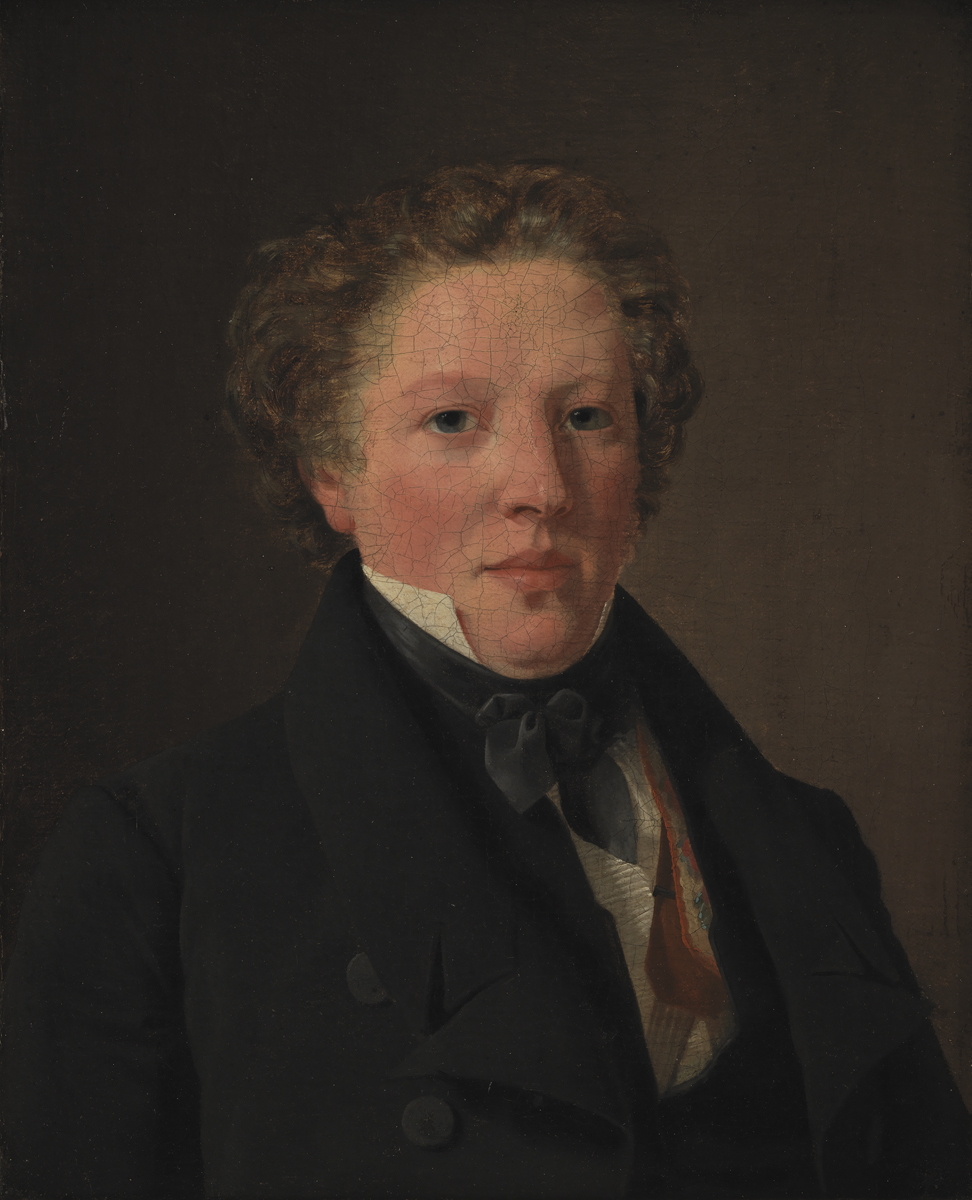
Christoffer Hvidt

No. 26 was home to four households at the 1834 census. Jørgen Johan Grønbech (1799-1847), a ship captain from Bornholm who worked for Peter F. Heering, resided on the ground floor with his wife Karen Marie (née Holm, married Samuelsen), their one-year-old daughter, two children from the wife's first marriage (aged six and seven) and a maid. Christoffer Hvid (1803-1872), an actor at the Royal Danish Theatre, resided on the first floor with his mother Annette Chirstine Hvid and a maid. Karen Steensen, the 76-year-old widow of ship captain C.G. Jørgensen, resided on the second floor with two unmarried daughters (both occupied with needlework) and two lodgers (a bookkeeper and a ship captain). Lars Andersen, a workman, resided in the basement with his wife Chrestiane Poulsen, their two children (aged seven and eight) and a maid.

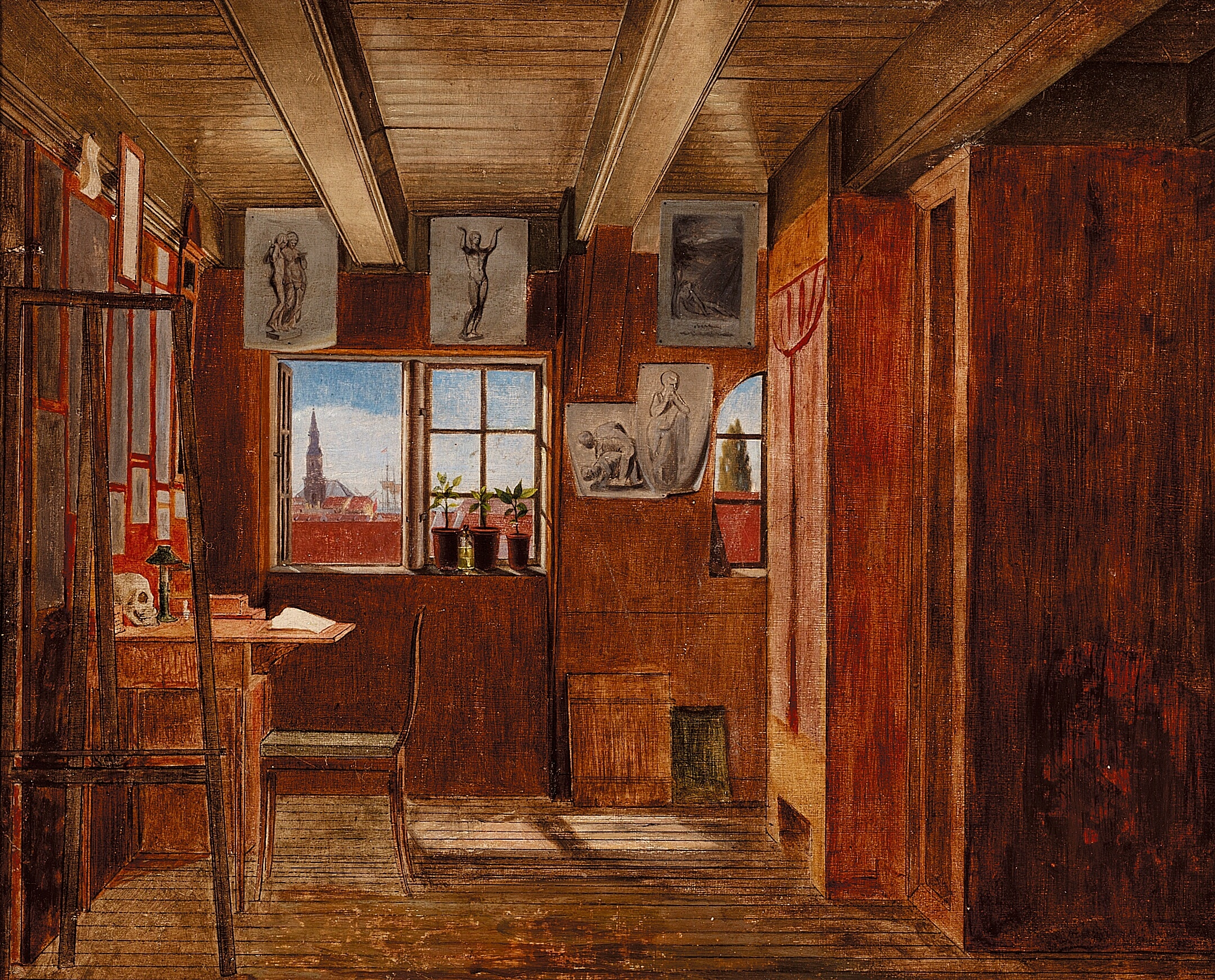
Hans Jørgen Hammer's studio in Nyhavn

The property was home to 23 residents in four households at the 1840 census. Jørgen Johan Grønbeck was still resident on the ground floor with his wife, their three children (one of them from the wife's first marriage, aged five to 13), portrait painter Hans Jørgen Hammer, painter William Hammer, mate Emil Christian Hammer and one maid. Carl Michael Møller, a bookkeeper, resided on the first floor with his wife Karen Christine Carlsen, their two children (aged one and four) and one maid. Karen Jørgensen (née Steensen), widow of a skipper, resided on the second floor with two unmarried daughters (aged 31 and 33) and one lodger. Johan Frederiksen, a grain grinder (kornmaler), resided in the basement with his wife Johanne Nielsen and their three children (aged one to seven).

The property was home to 19 residents in four households at the 1850 census. Karen Marie Grønbech, who had now become a widow, resided on the second floor with her three children (aged 15 to 23), one maid and one lodger. Morten Andersen, a ship captain, resided on the first floor with his wife Marie Cathrine (née Andernsen), their three children (aged 19 to 28) and one maid. The marine artist Carl Frederik Sørensen resided on the ground floor with his wife Bine Augustine Sørensen, their one-year-old daughter Maria Jacobine Sørensen and one maid. Fritz Iversen, a sailor, resided in the basement with his wife Johanne Dorthea Iversen and their 12-year-old son Frederik Johan Iversen.

=== 1860 census ===
The property was listed as Nyhavn 51 when house numbering by street was introduced in 1859 as a supplement to the old cadastral numbers by quarter. At the 1860 census, Nyhavn 51 was home to four households. Marie Margrethe Barfred (née Didrichsen, 1794-1875), widow of naval officer and customs inspector in Frederikshavn Jens Lauritz Barfred (1678-1855), resided in one of the apartments with her 36-year-old daughter Emma Adolphine Marie Barfred and one maid. Niels Christian Petersen, a barkeeper, resided in the building with his wife Karen Sophie Petersen. Hans Joachim Herman Toldberg, a floor clerk, resided in the building on his own. Ane Rosendahl, wife of Jens Rosendahl (who is not mentioned as a resident), resided in the building with their three children (aged one to five) and one maid.

=== 1880 census ===
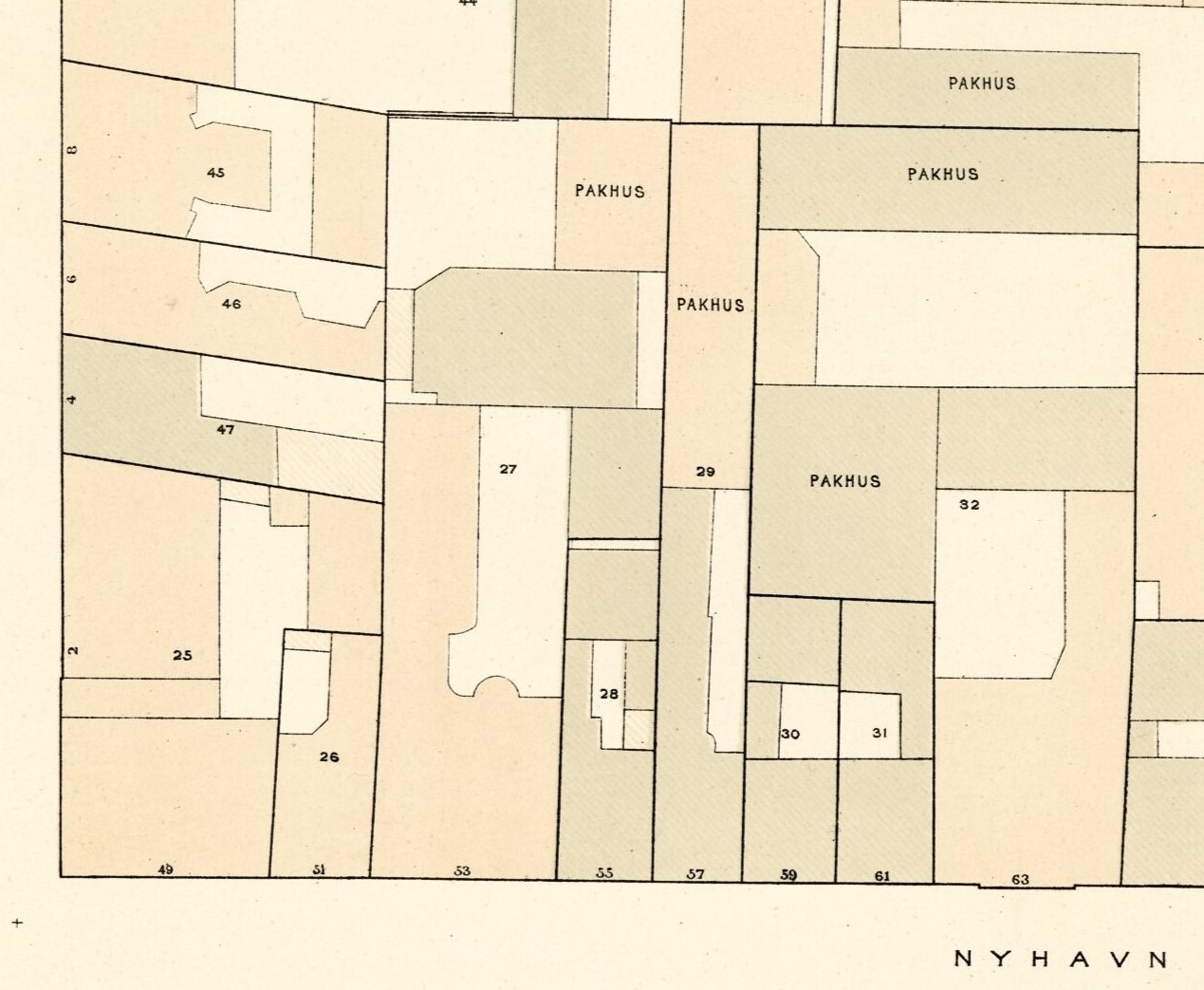
Nyhavn 51 seen in a detail from one of Berggreen's block plans, 1886–88

At the 1880 census, Nyhavn 51 home to 14 residents. Michael Christian Balck, a businessman (grosserer), resided on the first floor with his wife Cathrine, a clerk and a factory worker. Jens Johansen Resendahl, a judicial witness, resided on the second floor with his wife Margrethe Resendahl and two of their children (aged 18 and 24). Maria Svendsen, a widow, the proprietor of a shoemaker's workshop in the basement (widow), resided in the associated dwelling with the shop's manager William Ludvig Hendrik Lund, his wife Wilhelmine Katharina Lund, their two children (aged four and six) and one lodger (shoemaker).

=== 20th century ===
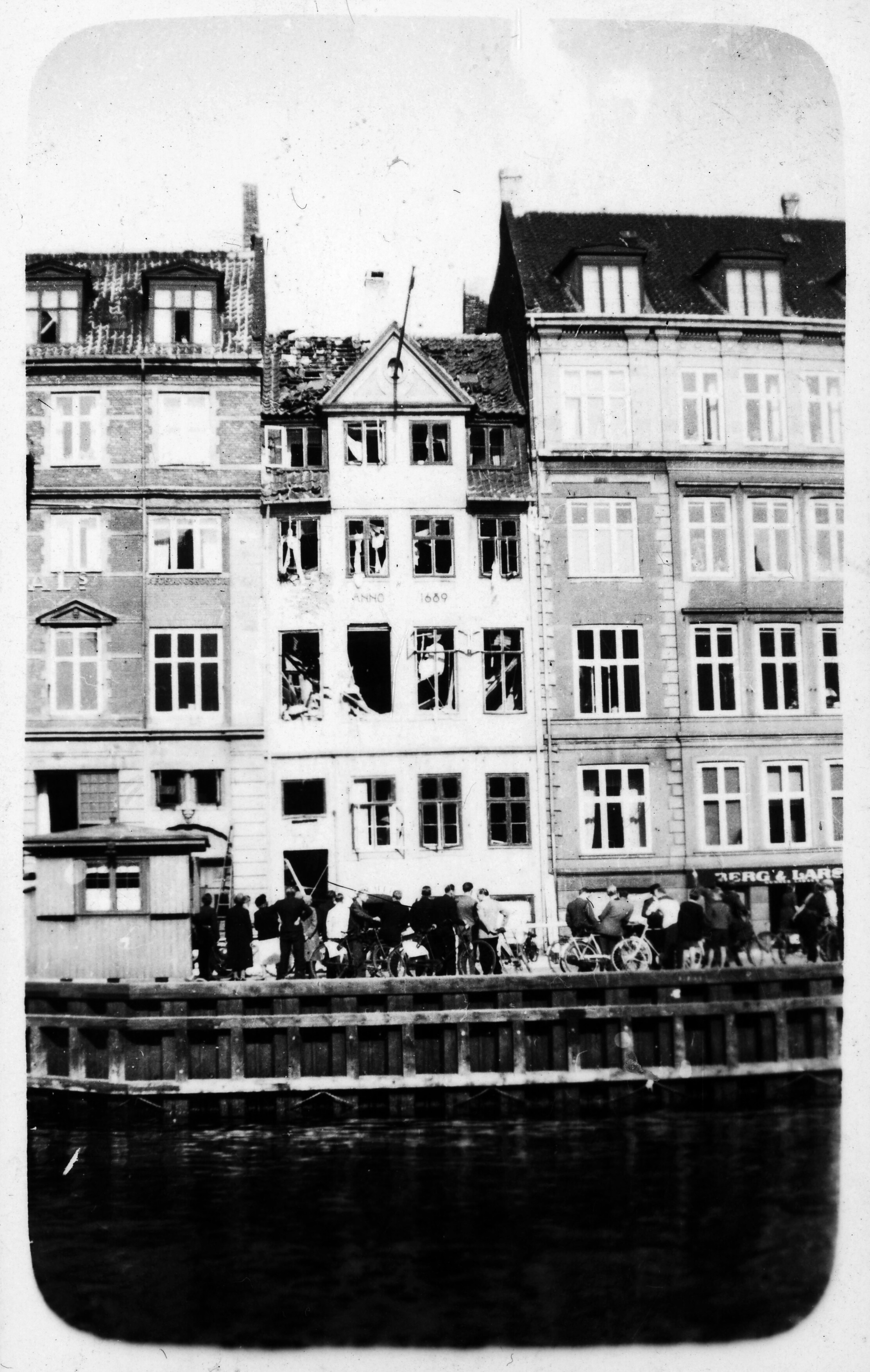
Nyhavn 51 after it was subject to Schalbourtage

The building was listed by the Danish Heritage Agency in the Danish national registry of protected buildings in 1918. The restaurant Det Gyldne Lam (The Golden Lamb) was for many years located in the cellar.

The building was subject to Schalburgtage on 21 September 1944. Two people were injured.

The property was renovated by the architect Erik Stengade in 1946 for its owner R. Høg-Petersen. The renovation received an award from Copenhagen Municipality in 1949.

Høg-Petersen married the Swedish-born dancer, singer and composer Eva Eklund. She inherited the restaurant after her husband in 1962. She turned it into one of the most popular places in Nyhavn. It was known for its live music.

== Architecture ==
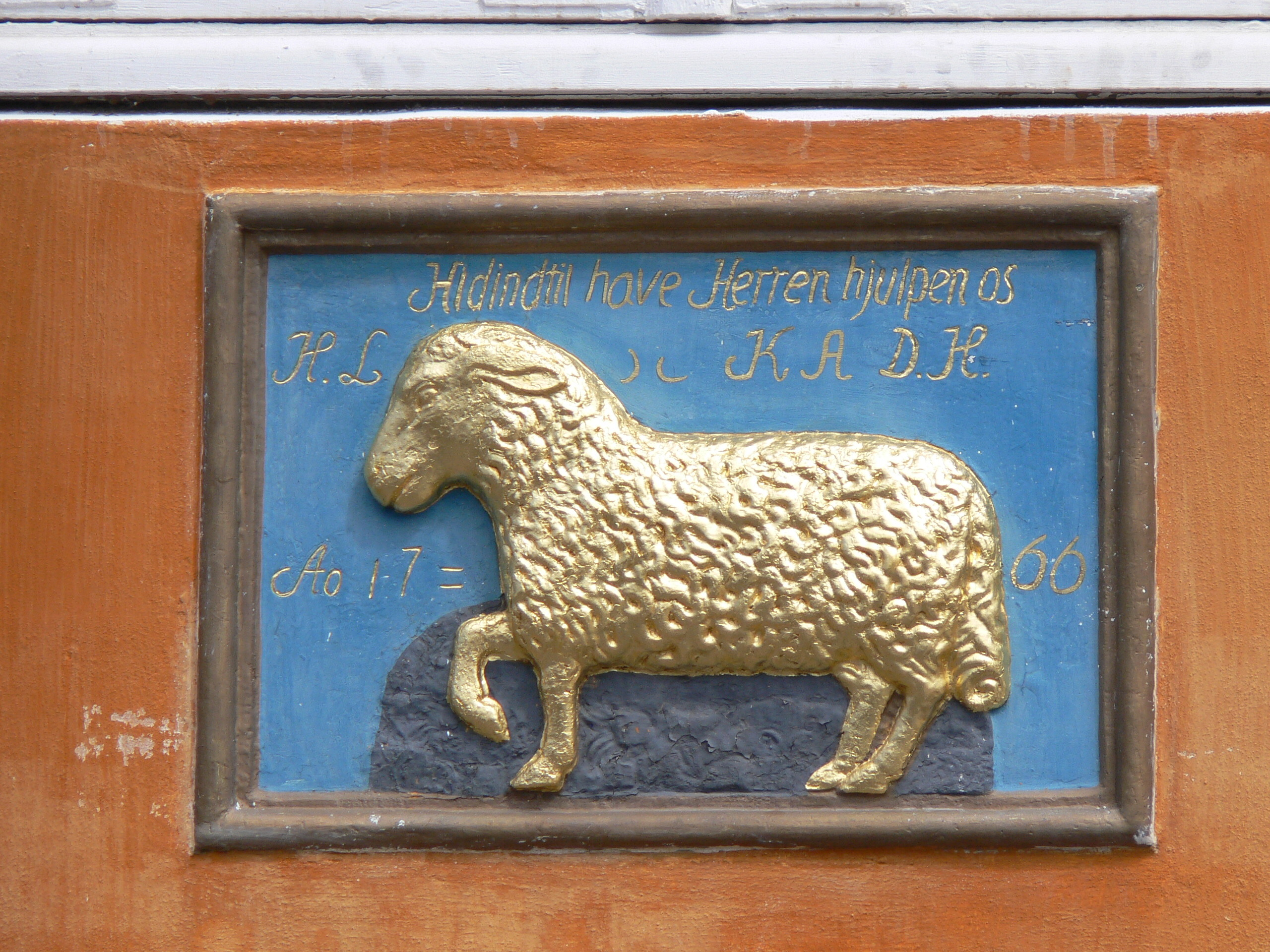
The sign with the lamb

The building is constructed with three storeys over a walk-out basement and is just three bays wide. The facade is crowned by a two-bay gabled wall dormer. Above the door is a painted stone relief depicting a lamb. The property was formerly known as Lammet (The Lamb) and the sign was used for identification in a time when house numbers had still not been introduced. The letters are the initials of the builder Henrich Lambertsen Engel and his wife Karen Nielsdatter Holm.

== Today ==
The property is owned by E/F Nyhavn 51. The building is now home to the pizzeria La Sirene.

== In popular culture ==
- In the 1933 film Nyhavn 17, a wedding carriage stops in front of the building and the main character disappears down into the restaurant.
- The restaurant in the cellar plays a central role in the 1967 comedy, Nyhavns glade gutter where it is called Restaurant Trinidad. The screenplay for the film was written by its owner, Eva Eklund, who also composed the music for two of its songs and had a small role in it.

== Gallery ==
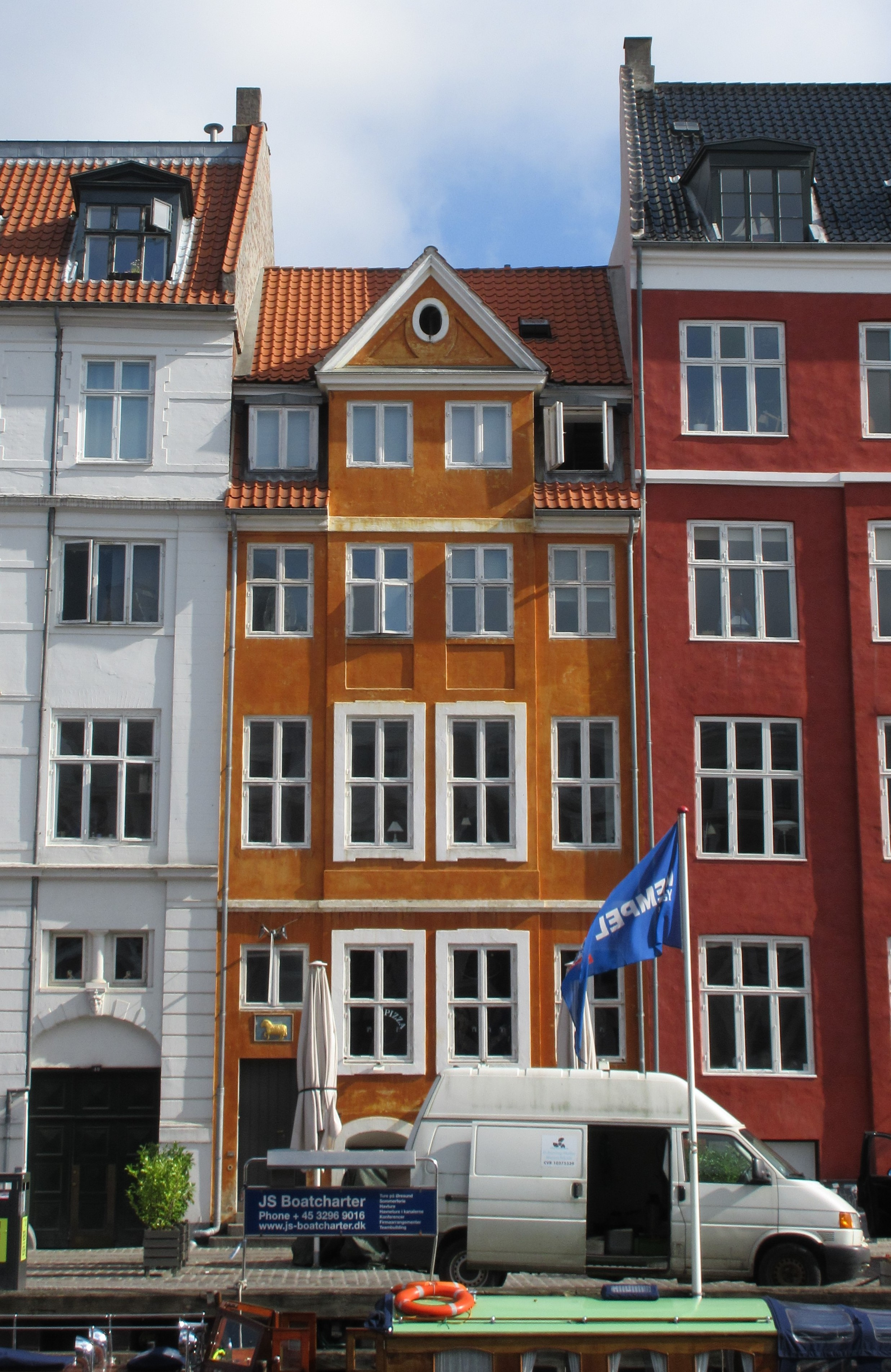
