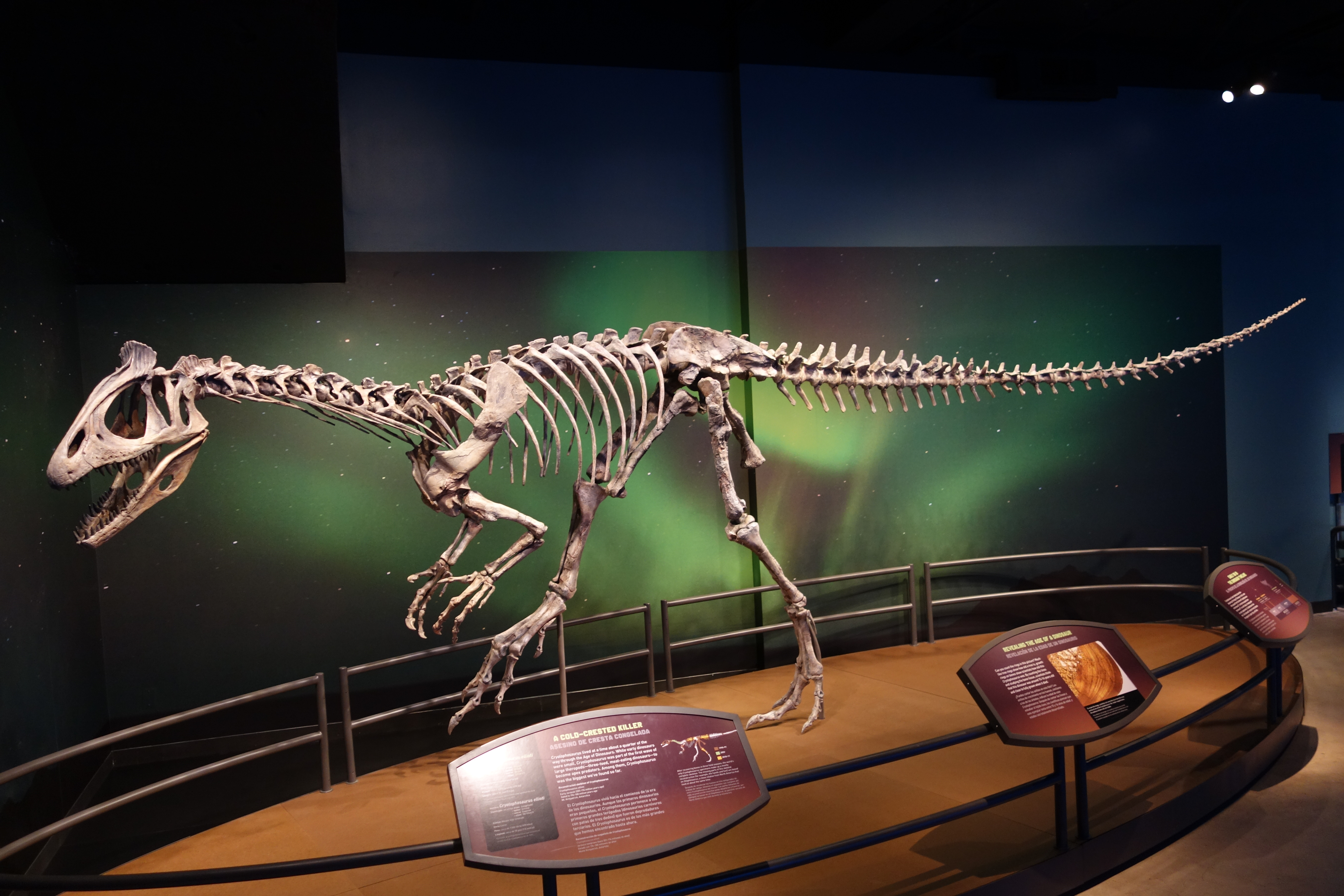
- Reconstructed skeleton, Field Museum of Natural History

Scientific classification
- Kingdom: Animalia
- Phylum: Chordata
- Class: Reptilia
- Clade: Dinosauria
- Clade: Saurischia
- Clade: Theropoda
- Clade: Neotheropoda
- Clade: Averostriformes
- Genus: †Cryolophosaurus; Hammer & Hickerson, 1994

Type species
- †Cryolophosaurus ellioti Hammer & Hickerson, 1994

= Cryolophosaurus =

Cryolophosaurus Temporal range: Early Jurassic (Pliensbachian), 194.6–182 Ma

Genus of theropod dinosaur from the early Jurassic period

Cryolophosaurus (/ˌkraɪəˌloʊfəˈsɔːrəs/ or /kraɪˌɒləfəˈsɔːrəs/; KRY-ə-LOH-fə-SAWR-əs) is a genus of large theropod dinosaur known from only a single species, Cryolophosaurus ellioti, from the Early Jurassic of Antarctica. It was one of the largest theropods of the Early Jurassic, with the subadult, being estimated to have reached 6–7 metres (20–23 ft) long and weighed 350–465 kilograms (772–1,025 lb).

Cryolophosaurus was first excavated from Antarctica's Early Jurassic, Pliensbachian aged Hanson Formation, formerly the upper Falla Formation, by paleontologist Dr. William Hammer in 1991. It was the first carnivorous dinosaur to be discovered in Antarctica, and the first non-avian dinosaur from the continent to be officially named. The sediments in which its fossils were found have been dated to about 196 to 188 million years ago, representing the Early Jurassic Period.

Cryolophosaurus is known from a skull, a femur and other material, all of which have caused its classification to vary greatly. The femur possesses many primitive characteristics that have classified Cryolophosaurus as a dilophosaurid, or a neotheropod outside of Dilophosauridae and Averostra, whereas the skull has many advanced features, leading the genus to be considered a tetanuran, an abelisaurid, a ceratosaur and even an allosaurid. Cryolophosaurus is currently considered to be a derived neotheropod, close to Averostra. Additionally, Cryolophosaurus possessed a distinctive "pompadour" crest that spanned the head from side to side. Based on evidence from related species and studies of bone texture, it is thought that this bizarre crest was used for intra-species recognition. The brain of Cryolophosaurus was also more primitive than those of other theropods.

== Discovery and naming ==
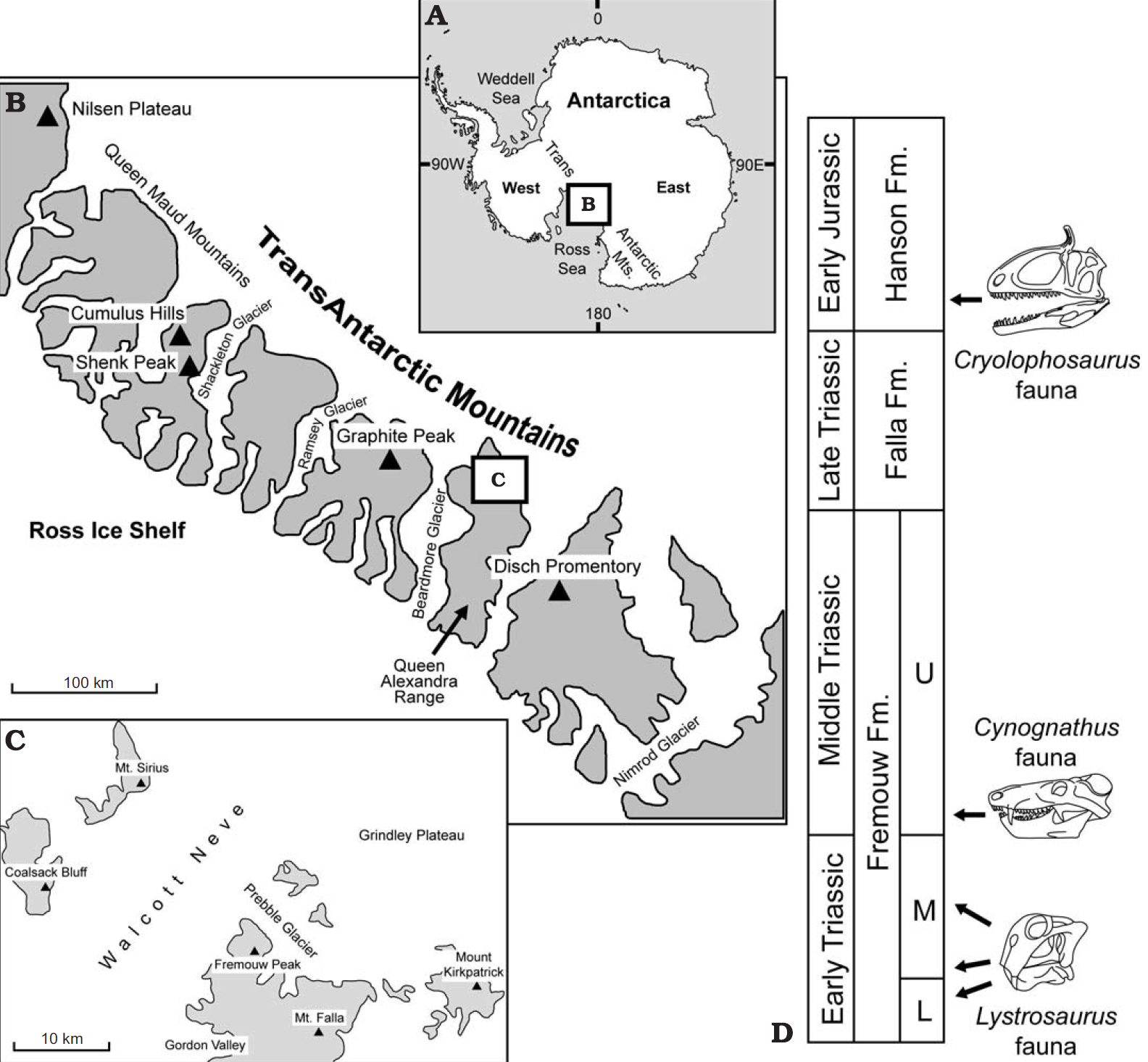
Map showing location of the Mount Kirkpatrick dinosaur site, with stratigraphic context on the right

Cryolophosaurus originally was collected during the 1990–91 austral summer on Mount Kirkpatrick in the Beardmore Glacier region of the Transantarctic Mountains. The discovery was made by Hammer, a professor at Augustana College, and his team. The fossils were found in the siliceous siltstone of the Hanson Formation, formerly the upper Falla Formation, and dated back to the Pliensbachian Stage of the early Jurassic. Cryolophosaurus was the second dinosaur, and first theropod to be discovered in Antarctica. It was discovered after Antarctopelta, but named earlier.

In 1991, both Hammer and the Ohio State University geologist, David Elliot excavated separate outcrops near Beardmore Glacier, sharing logistical expenses. Elliot's team first came across the remains of Cryolophosaurus in a rock formation around the altitude of 4,000 m (13,000 ft) high and about 640 km (400 mi) from the South Pole. When the discovery was made, they soon notified Hammer. Over the next three weeks, Hammer excavated 2,300 kg (5,100 lb) of fossil-bearing rock. The team recovered over 100 fossil bones, including those of Cryolophosaurus. The specimens were formally named and described in 1994 by Hammer and Hickerson, in the journal Science.

During the 2003 season, a field team returned and collected more material from the original site. A second locality was discovered about 30 metres (98 ft) higher in the section on Mt. Kirkpatrick.

The name Cryolophosaurus ellioti is derived from the Greek words κρυος (meaning 'cold' or 'frozen', in reference to its discovery in Antarctica), λοφος (meaning 'crest') and σαυρος (meaning 'lizard'), thus "cold crest lizard". Hammer and Hickerson named the species C. ellioti, after David Elliot, who had made the initial discovery of the fossils.

== Description ==
Size comparison

Cryolophosaurus was a large, well-built theropod, one of the largest of its time. The holotype specimen is estimated to have reached 6–7 m (20–23 ft) long and weighed 350–465 kg (772–1,025 lb). Some researchers noted that the holotype individual probably represents a sub-adult, so adults could have been larger. Despite having slender proportions, Cryolophosaurus is one of the largest known Early Jurassic theropods. The larger adults are estimated at 8 m (26 ft) in length.

The holotype FMNH PR1821 is the only fully described specimen of Cryolophosaurus. The specimen consists of an incomplete skull and mandibles, lacking most of the front half; nine maxillary teeth; a fragmentary sixth cervical centrum; cervical vertebrae 7–10; several posterior cervical ribs; several anterior dorsal vertebrae; most mid and posterior dorsal vertebrae; several dorsal ribs; the fifth sacral vertebrae; three chevrons; many partial and complete caudal vertebrae and centra; two partial humeri; a proximal radius; a proximal ulna; a partial ilium; a proximal pubis; both ischia, but only one distal; two incomplete femora; the distal end of a tibia; the distal end of a fibula, and the astragalus and calcaneum. In 2013, new material of Cryolophosaurus was unearthed in Antarctica. The description of this material has not yet been published in a non-abstract form.

Possible life restoration with feathers

=== Skull ===
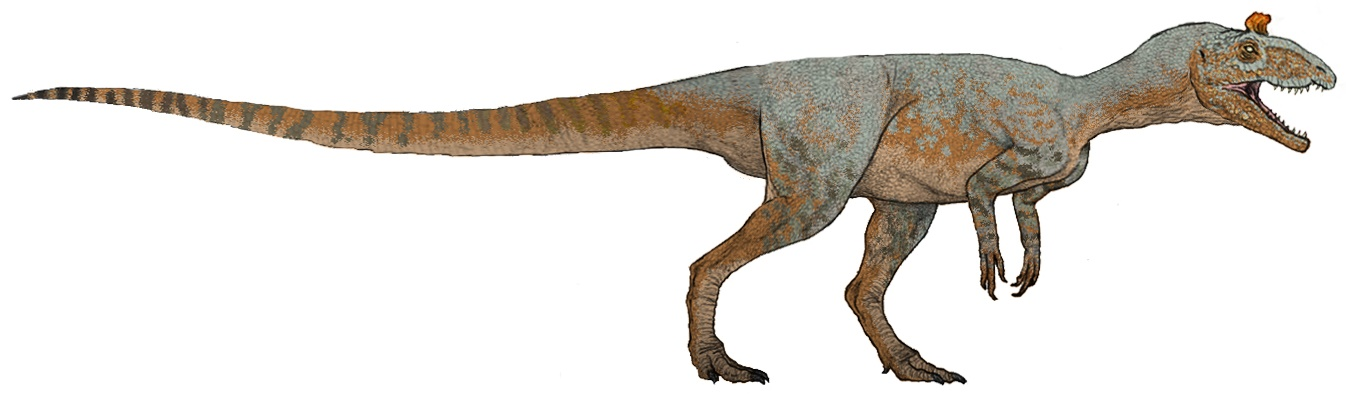
Life restoration

The holotype of C. ellioti consists of a high, narrow skull, which was discovered articulated with the rest of the skeleton. The skull is an estimated 65 centimetres (26 in) long. It has a peculiar nasal crest that runs just over the eyes, where it rises perpendicular to the skull and fans out. It is thin and highly furrowed, giving it a unique "pompadour" appearance and earned it the nickname "Elvisaurus." The crest is an extension of the skull bones, near the tear ducts, fused on either side to orbital horns, which rise from the eye sockets. While other theropods, like the Monolophosaurus have crests, they usually run along the skull instead of across it.

An unpublished study conducted by Vernon Meidlinger-Chin in 2013 suggested that previous studies lacked focus on endocranial details. The study found that the Cryolophosaurus fossil has a nearly complete, undistorted cranial cavity which is complete enough to give an approximate shape and size of the living brain. The endocast features clarified the dissimilarity of the skull with those of Allosauroids and Coelurosaurs giving Cryolophosaurus a basal position in Theropoda. Closer examination of how the skull bones fused reviewed details in the snout and forehead that are exceptionally similar to Dilophosaurus.

== Classification ==
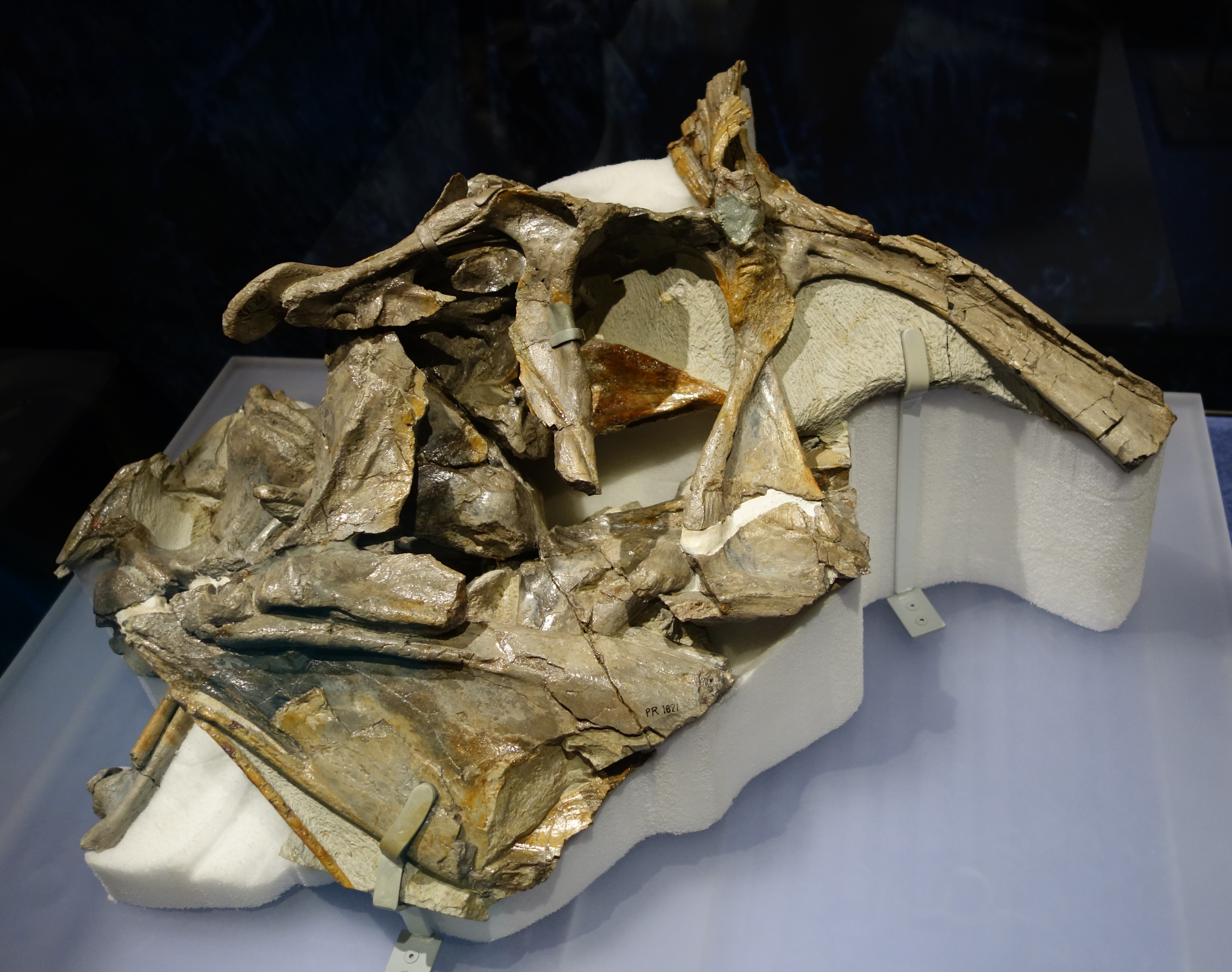
The unrestored holotype skull, FMNH PR1821.

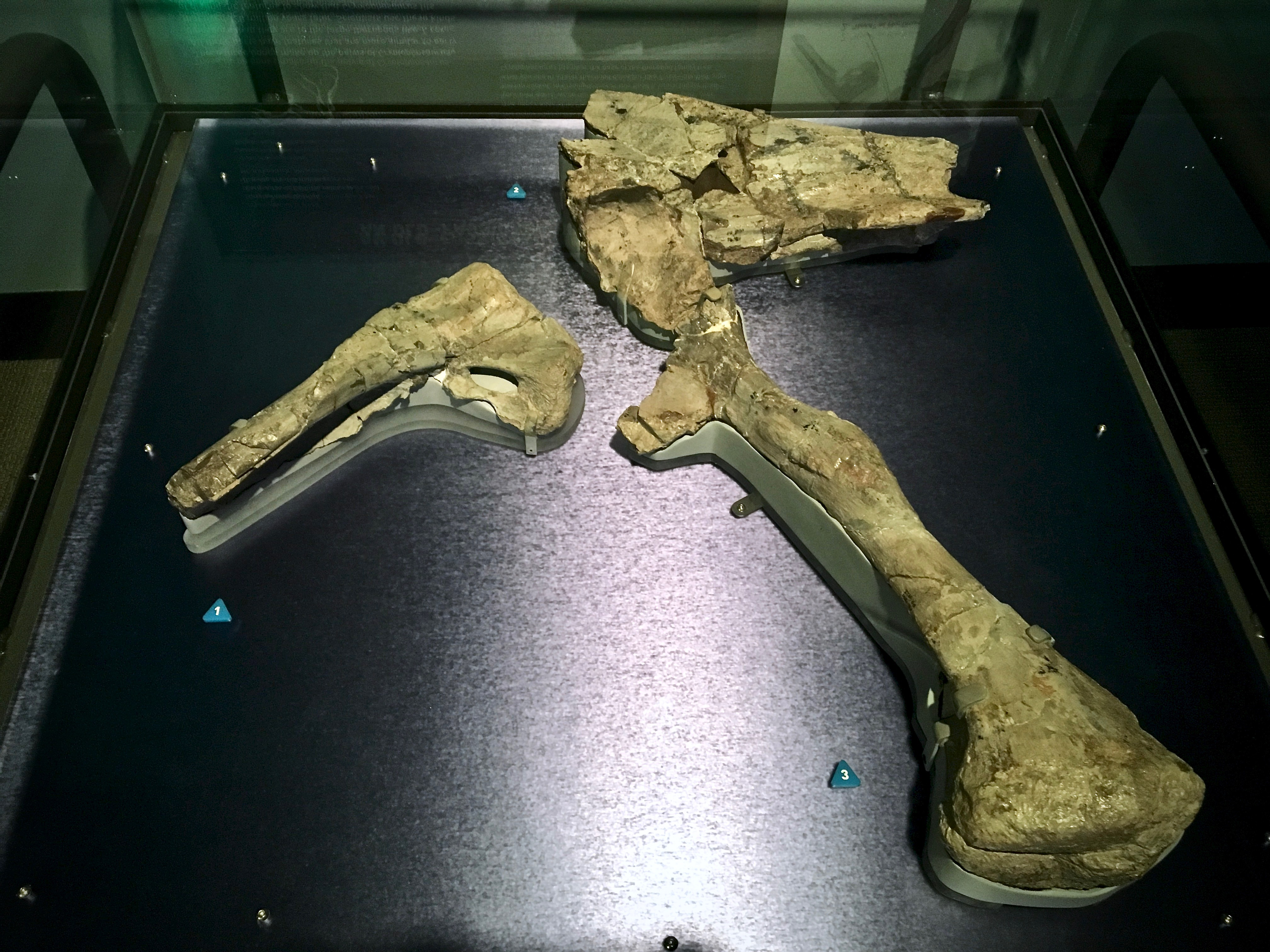
Fossil pelvis of Cryolophosaurus. The loop at the widest part of the pubis is large compared to later theropods.

Classification of Cryolophosaurus is difficult because it has a mix of primitive and advanced characteristics. The femur has traits of early theropods, while the skull resembles much later species of the clade Tetanurae, like China's Sinraptor and Yangchuanosaurus. This led Paul Sereno et al. (1994) to place Cryolophosaurus in the taxon Allosauridae. Originally, Hammer and colleagues suspected that C. ellioti might be a ceratosaur, or even an early abelisaur, with some traits convergent with those of more advanced tetanurans, but ultimately concluded that it was itself the earliest known member of the tetanuran group. While a subsequent study by Hammer (along with Smith and Currie) again recovered Cryolophosaurus as a tetanuran, a later (2007) study by the same authors found that it was more closely related to Dilophosaurus and Dracovenator. Sterling Nesbitt et al. (2009), using the characters of Tawa found Cryolophosaurus to be neither a dilophosaurid nor averostran neotheropod, but instead the sister group of a clade composed of dilophosaurids and averostrans. However, in 2012, Matthew Carrano found that Cryolophosaurus was a tetanuran, related to Sinosaurus, but unrelated to Dilophosaurus. In 2020, a monograph of Dilophosaurus found Cryolophosaurus to be a derived neotheropod, close to Averostra, in a more derived position than Zupaysaurus, but less than Dilophosaurus.

The following cladogram illustrates a synthesis of the relationships of the early theropod groups compiled by Hendrickx et al. in 2015.

- Neotheropoda
  - Coelophysidae
  - - Liliensternus
    - - Zupaysaurus
      - - Dilophosauridae
        - Averostra
          - Ceratosauria
          - Tetanurae
            - Cryolophosaurus
            - Sinosaurus
            - - Monolophosaurus
              - Orionides
                - Megalosauroidea
                - Avetheropoda
                  - Allosauroidea
                  - Coelurosauria

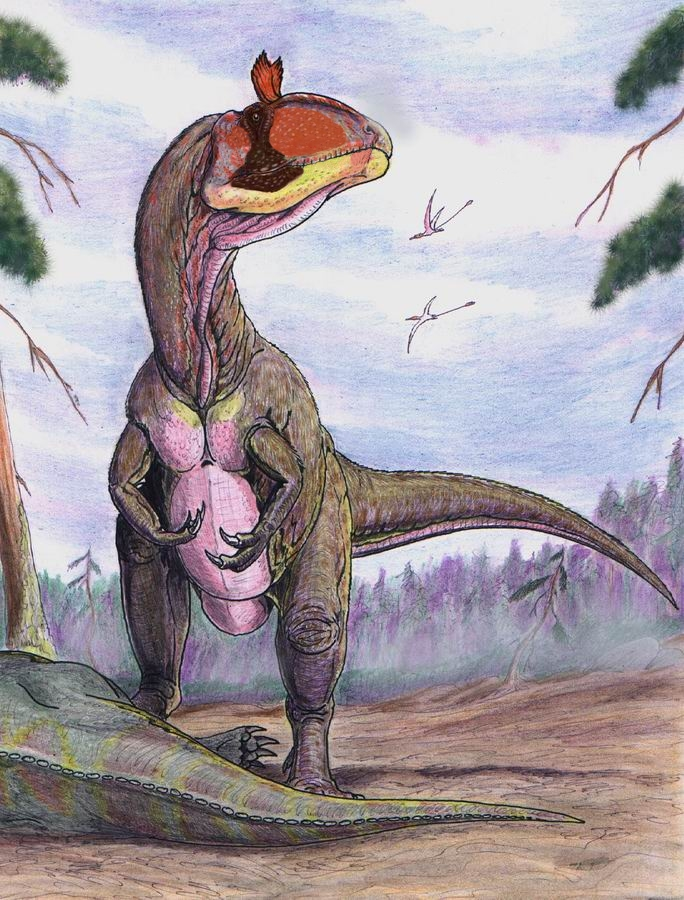
Restoration of a Cryolophosaurus in its environment

However, a 2020 study conducted by Adam Marsh and Timothy Rowe found C. ellioti to be a basal neotheropod. While it was still closer to Averostra than Coelophysoidea was, it was still more basal than Dilophosaurus.

- Neotheropoda
  - Coelophysoidea
    - - Lepidus
      - Liliensternus
    - - Coelophysis? kayentakatae
      - - Coelophysis
        - - Megapnosaurus
          - Camposaurus
  - - Zupaysaurus
    - - Cryolophosaurus
      - - Dilophosaurus
        - Averostra
          - Ceratosauria
          - Tetanurae

== Paleobiology ==
=== Cranial ornamentation ===
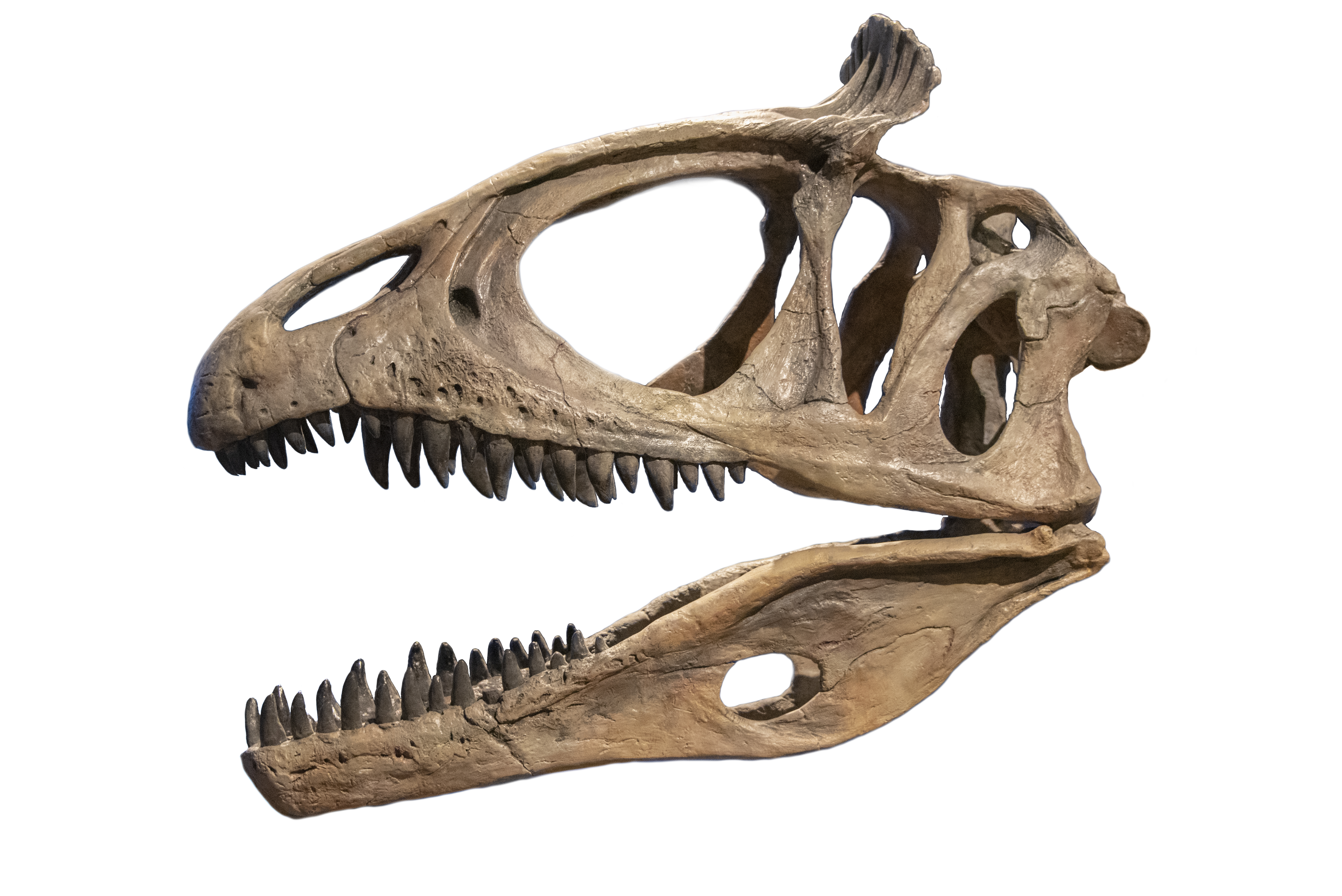
Reconstructed skull

Cranial display features, such as the one possessed by Cryolophosaurus, make sense in social, gregarious animals, where other members of the species are available to observe and interpret messages of sexual status. Kevin Padian et al. (2004) challenged conventional hypotheses that the purpose of bizarre cranial structures and post-cranial armor in dinosaurs, was either for attracting mates, intimidating/fighting rivals in the group, or intimidating potential predators of other species. Padian et al. noted that based on phylogenetic, histological, and functional evidence these bizarre structures can be explained by the phenomenon of intra-species recognition, which is supported by the fossil evidence. Thomas R. Holtz Jr. (2010) found that the bizarre crest of C. llioti was primarily for intra-species recognition, based on evidence from related species and studies of bone texture. According to Thomas Rich and his colleagues, the crest would have been ineffective as a weapon and may have possibly functioned as a display feature during certain types of social behavior such as mating. In 2019, a species recognition function was disputed but a socio-sexual display structure model was suggested.

=== Diet ===
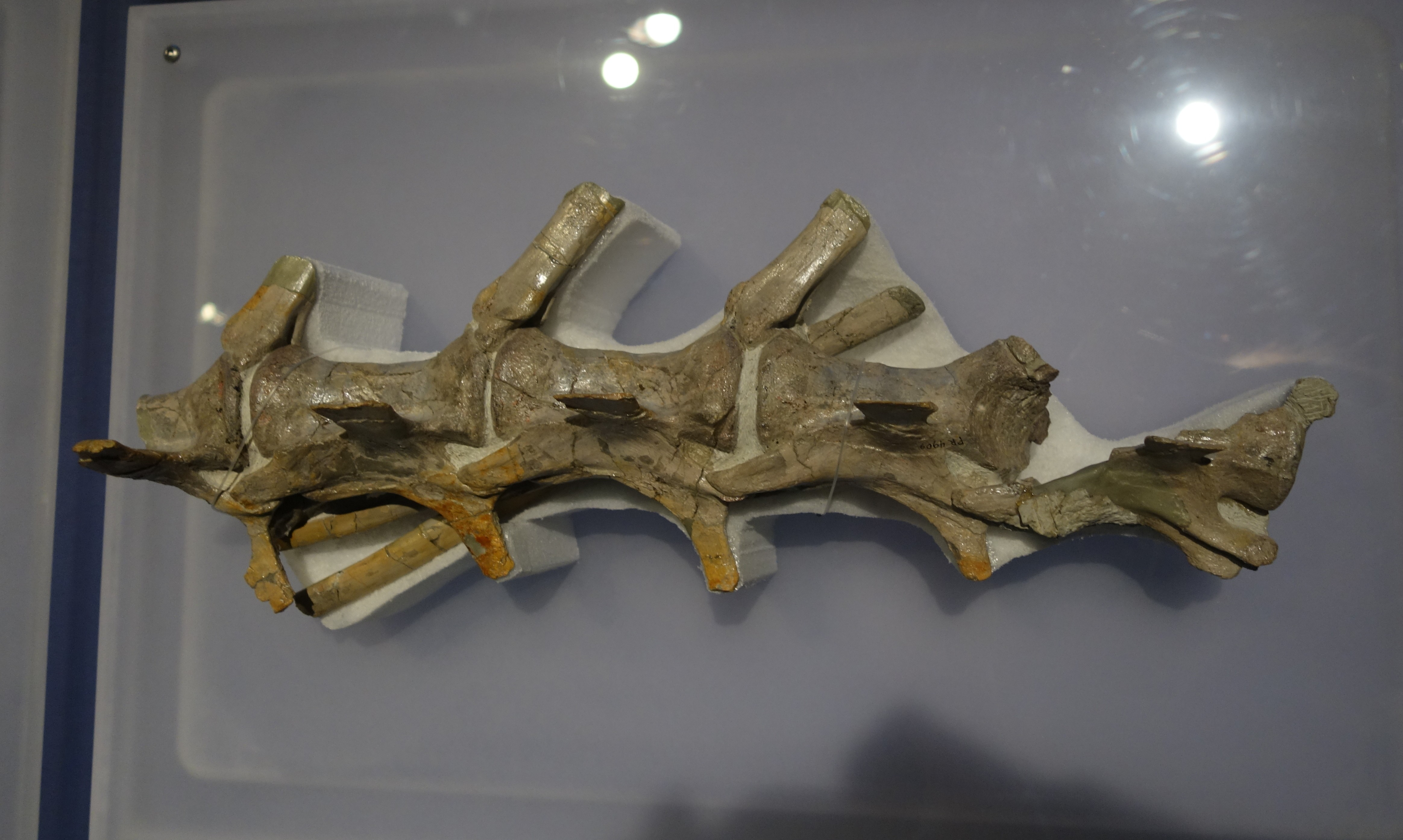
Cryolophosaurus caudal vertebrae dorsal view

When the type specimen was discovered, several long cervical ribs, of a supposed prosauropod dinosaur were found in the mouth of Cryolophosaurus, which led Hammer (1998) to conclude that it was feeding on the prosauropod when it died. Hammer further noted that since the ribs were found extending all the way back to the theropod's neck region, this individual may have choked to death on these ribs. However, Smith et al. concluded that these remains belonged to the Cryolophosaurus specimen itself, and not to Hammer's "prosauropod". Hammer also concluded that a post-canine tooth belonging to a tritylodont (an early mammal relative), found with the remains, was part of its stomach contents when it died.

=== Paleopathology ===
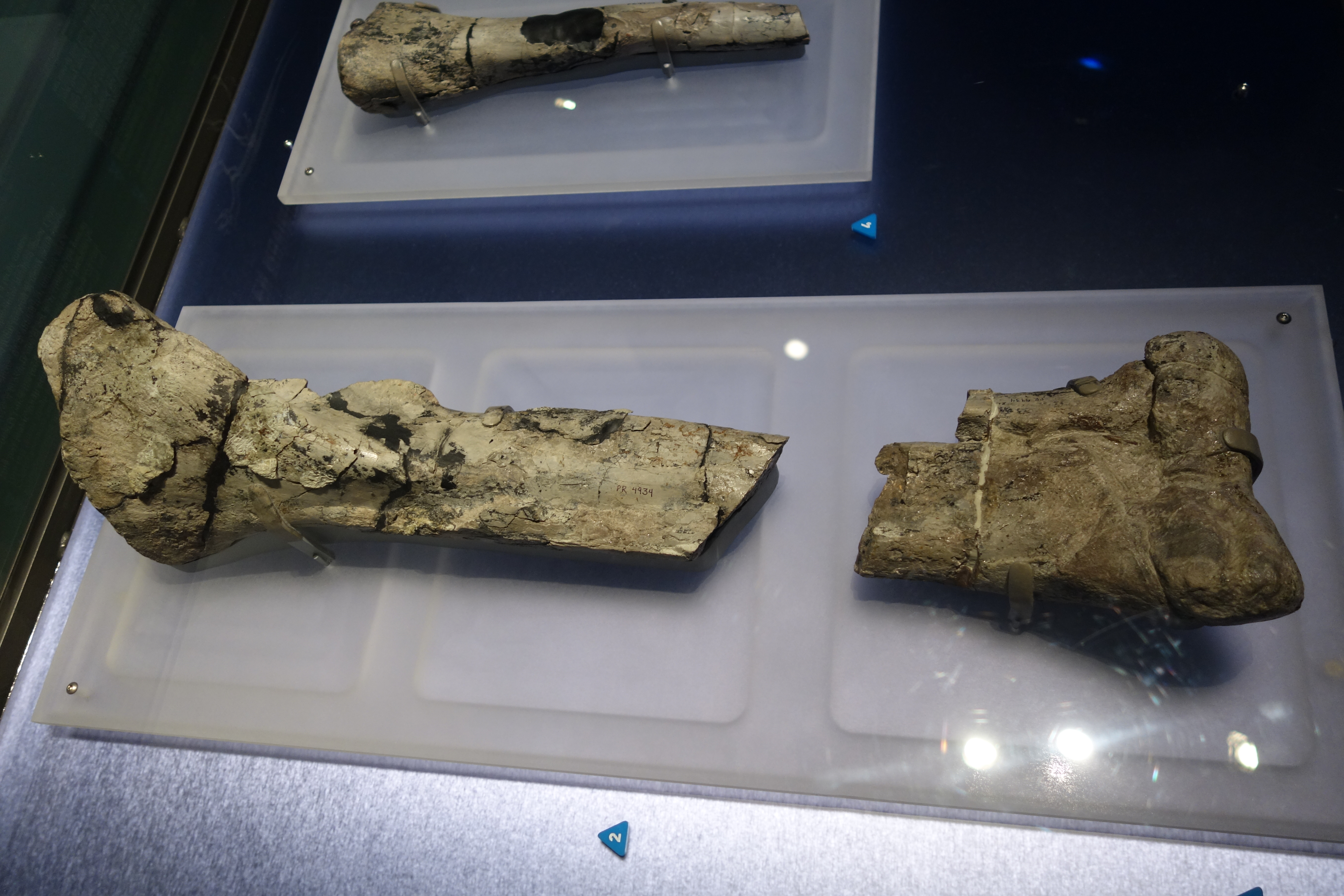
Cryolophosaurus left tibia (upper) and left tibia and fibula (lower) with calcaneum and astragalus

Some Cryolophosaurus bones have pathologies that show evidence of scavenging. Broken teeth from a juvenile Cryolophosaurus were found nearby. These teeth have no roots and likely shed naturally while scavenging the adult Cryolophosaurus carcass.

Another possible pathology is found in the astragalus (ankle bone) of Cryolophosaurus. This bone was preserved with a small splint from the fibula located just above the ankle. The splint, however, may also be just a unique morphological feature of Cryolophosaurus.

== Paleoenvironment ==
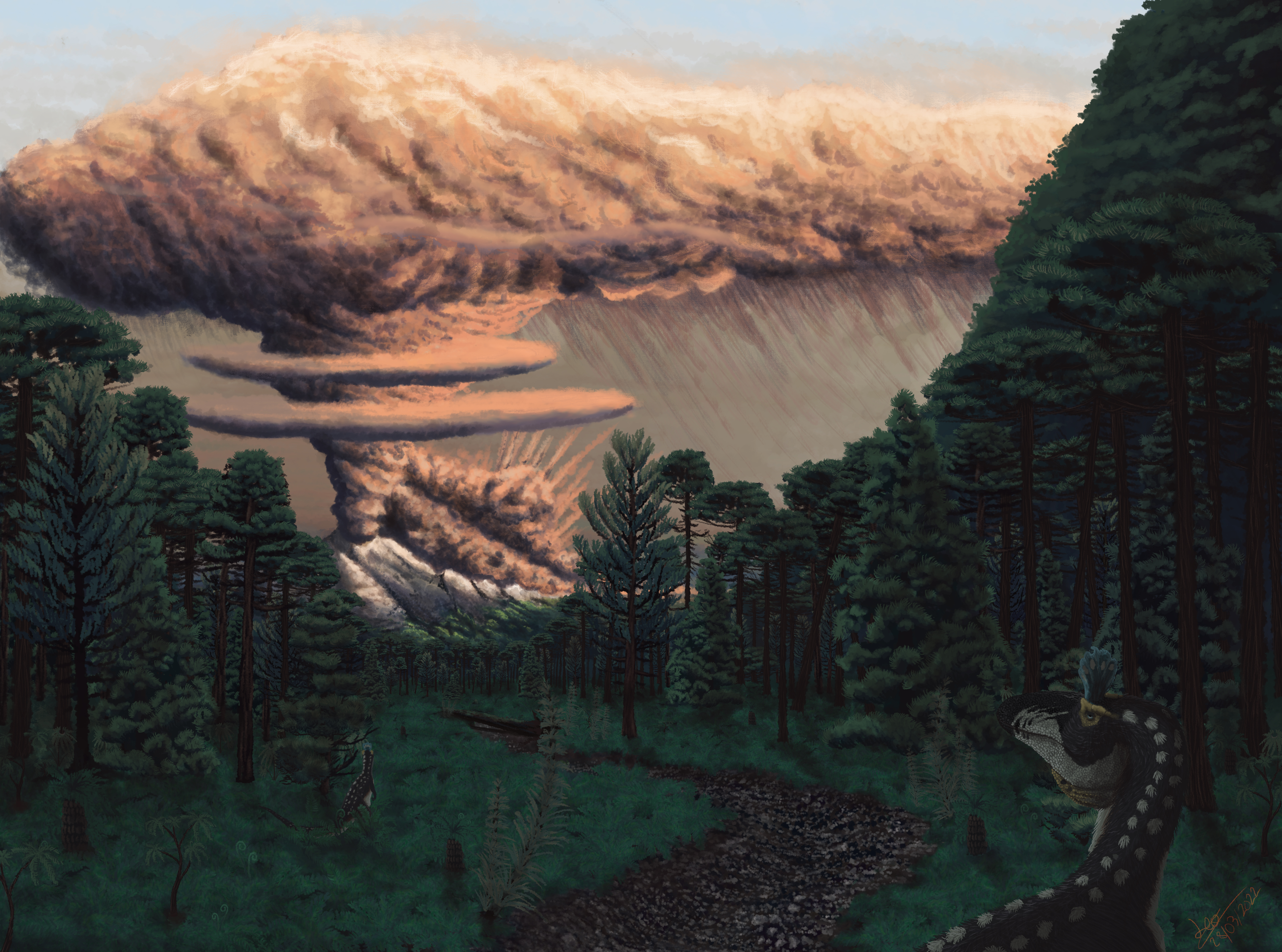
Some sediments in the Hanson Formation are of volcanic origin, suggesting Plinian eruptions during the deposition

All known specimens of Cryolophosaurus have been recovered in the Hanson Formation, which is one of only two major dinosaur-bearing rock formations found on the continent of Antarctica. Cryolophosaurus was found about 650 kilometres (400 mi) from the South Pole but, at the time it lived, this was about 1,000 km (621 mi) or so farther north. The Hanson Formation accumulated in a rift environment located between c. 60 and 70S, fringing the East Antarctic Craton behind the active Panthalassan margin of southern Gondwana, being dominated by two types of facies: "tuffaceous" siltstone of fluvial and volcanic strata, deposited maybe more than 10 million years based on the thickness. In the Early Jurassic, Antarctica was closer to the equator and the world was considerably warmer than today, but the climate was still cool temperate similar to that of modern southern Chile, and humid, with a temperature interval of 17–18 degrees. Models of Jurassic air flow indicate that coastal areas probably never dropped much below freezing, although more extreme conditions existed inland.

This formation has produced the remains of two smaller theropods, the sauropodomorph Glacialisaurus, a crow-sized pterosaur (a dimorphodontid), a tritylodont, herbivorous synapsid, and two small unnamed sauropodomorphs. Beyond vertebrates, Insects (Blattodea, Coleoptera), Ostracodans, Conchostracans and arthropod ichnofossils (Diplichnites, Planolites, Scoyenia) are known from other coeval localities, like Gair Mesa, Mount Carson or Shafer Peak. Plant remains are also very common, including large tree trunks (+50 cm) from Mount Carson to Palynomorphs at Shafer Peak. Macrofoliar and cuticle remains have also been recovered from several localities, including Conifers (Araucariaceae, Cheirolepidiaceae, Cupressaceae, Pinaceae or Voltziales), Cycadophytes (Bennettitales), Pteridosperms (Corystospermaceae), Ferns (Dipteridaceae, Matoniaceae, Osmundaceae and Polypodiales), Equisetaceae, Isoetaceae and Liverworts (Marchantiales). Some of the plant remains are relictual genera, like the youngest record of Dicroidium. Common presence of the invertebrate ichnogenus Planolites indicates the local fluvial, alluvial or lacustrine waters where likely continuous all year, as well the presence of abundant Otozamites trends to suggest high humidity. Overall points to a setting with strong seasonality in day-length, given the high latitude, perhaps similar to warm-temperate, frost-free forest and open woodland as in North Island of New Zealand. Despite the proper conditions, peat accumulation was rare, mostly due to the influence of local volcanism, along with common wildfire activity as shown by charred coalified plant remains.
