= Eva Eklund =

Swedish-Danish dancer, singer, composer, and restaurateur

Eva Anni Sofie Eklund (17 December 1922– 19 November 2015), later Eva Høgh-Petersen, was a Swedish-Danish dancer, singer, composer and restaurateur.

== Biography ==
Eklund began her career as a model and dancer at the Pantomime Theatre in Tivoli Gardens. In I 1939, she was hired for Gustav Wally's revue at Södra Teatern in Stockholm. In 1942, she appeared in an Albert Gaubier show. In 1947, she was engaged as a dancer in a circus in Aarhus but she fell ill and had to give up her dancing career. In the early 1950s, she became artistic director at the record company Universal Grammophone. She also recorded a number of popular dance albums under the name Eve Annie. She also composed the music for the schlager Lirekassemandens datter which became a hit both in Denmark and abroad.

== 1967 comedy film ==
In I 1967, she was a co-writer of the screenplay for the comedy film Onkel Joakims hemmelighed (also known as Nyhavns glade gutter). She also composed the music for two of its songs, 1-2-3-4 and Tit tit. She also played a small role in the film. The film is about a young, spoiled girl who inherits a restaurant in Nyhavn. It is partly inspired by her own experiences. In 1962, she took over restaurant Det Gyldne Lam (The Golden Lamb) at Nyhavn 51 after her mother and turned it into one of the most popular places in Nyhavn with live music and dance. Her husband, Robert Høeg-Petersen, owned the building.
