= Hans Jørgen Hammer =

Danish painter and printmaker (1815–1882)

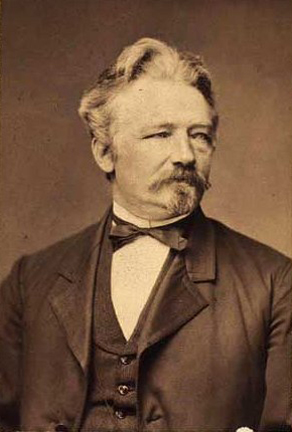
Hans Jørgen Hammer photo: Budtz Müller Studio

Hans Jørgen Hammer (29 December 1815 – 28 January 1882) was a genre, landscape, and portrait painter and printmaker of the Golden Age of Danish painting. In addition, he served for eleven years as a military officer.

== Biography ==
Hans Jørgen Hammer was born in Copenhagen to Johanne (née Bistrup) and Peder Pedersen Hammer, a shipmaster. A younger brother, William Hammer (1821–1889), also became a painter. As a boy Hammer displayed an aptitude for drawing, and he received his first training from the Norwegian-Danish master Jon Gulsen Berg (1783–1864), a court painter and wallpaper designer.

Hammer was admitted to the Royal Danish Academy of Fine Arts as an apprentice in 1828. His development was slow, and in 1835 he worked as an assistant to a decoration painter. Beginning in 1836, he trained for four years at the Plaster Cast School, and in 1840 he advanced to the Live Model School. From 1841 to 1843 he studied with Christoffer Wilhelm Eckersberg, the great "father of Denmark's Golden Age", who would remain a friend and mentor. Like many Academy students, Hammer was strongly influenced by Niels Laurits Høyen, an early champion of the National Romantic movement who advanced a new Nordic understanding of culture and art, advising students to eschew travel to foreign lands and urging them to portray the Danish people of humble agricultural origins in rural settings where folkways were as yet untouched by industrialization. Hammer was able to exhibit his works as early as 1838, and in 1842 he was awarded the Academy's Small Silver Medal. In 1843 he graduated from the Academy and earned a Great Silver Medal. In 1845 he entered the Neuhausen Art Competition with Farmers Return Home from the Field with the Final Sheaves of Grain. While the painting did not win the prize, it was purchased for the Royal Painting Collection. In 1847 he won the Neuhausen Prize (De Neuhausenske Præmier) with Farmboys and Girls Gather for Outdoor Merrymaking on a Holiday Afternoon, another nostalgic work purchased for the Royal Painting Collection.

Hammer's career was interrupted in 1848 by the outbreak of Denmark's Three Years' War with Prussia over hegemony in the Duchy of Schleswig. He volunteered and was commissioned as a naval ship-of-the-line lieutenant in March 1849. In the years following Denmark's fragile victory, he remained on active duty with the rank of captain before shifting to the reserves and finally leaving the service entirely in 1860.

Prior to the war Hammer had been encouraged to apply for a stipend to cover the expense of a sojourn in Italy, and finally at the age of 41 he traveled there with the financial support of the Academy of Fine Arts. The paintings he produced in Italy in 1856–57 and immediately thereafter had considerable public appeal. A Square in Ariccia after Sunset (1862) with its striking coloration was highly praised and purchased for the Royal Painting Collection. Highlights among his later works are Den lille Axsamlerske (1866) and The Postman with the Long-Awaited Letter (1877). He delved into national history with Jens Baggesen and Count Schimmelmann (1872, painted in two copies) and Count Gert and Niels Ebbesen (unfinished, despite extensive preparatory studies), and he also illustrated works of Hans Christian Andersen, Adam Oehlenschläger, and Christian Winther.

In 1862 he was decorated a knight of the Order of the Dannebrog, and in 1874 he was named a member of the Academy of Fine Arts. He traveled to the United States in 1874–75 to visit relatives and also visited Skagen in 1875, painting motifs in both locales. He also traveled to the Centennial Exposition in Philadelphia in 1876. He was decorated a knight of the Order of St. Olav in 1877 and was awarded a travel stipend from the Carl Andreas Anker Legacy in 1879. Hammer came close to dying of anemia, but he recovered and was able to travel to Italy for a second time in 1881–82. That winter he caught a cold and succumbed to fever, and he is buried in Rome's Protestant Cemetery. Hammer, who never married, was described by contemporary art historian Philip Weilbach as serious, diligent, and thoughtful, but also somewhat labored and tentative. A perfectionist streak is said to have curtailed his productivity and hampered his creativity.

His likeness is preserved in a portrait by Constantin Hansen (1863), a woodcut after a Bertel Christian Budtz Müller studio photograph, and various self-portraits, including one drawn in pencil and held by the Frederiksborg Museum. A number of his drawings and engravings are held by the Royal Collection of Graphic Art, the ARoS Aarhus Kunstmuseum, the Roskilde Museum, the Randers Museum of Art, the Vejle Museum of Art, and the Museet på Koldinghus. His paintings are in the Fuglsang Art Museum on Lolland, the Bornholm Art Museum, the Sorø Art Museum, the Museum of Modern Art in Aalborg and, in Copenhagen, in the National Gallery, the Hirschsprung Collection, the Rosenborg Collections, the City Museum, and the M/S Maritime Museum of Denmark.

== Gallery ==
Danish Motifs

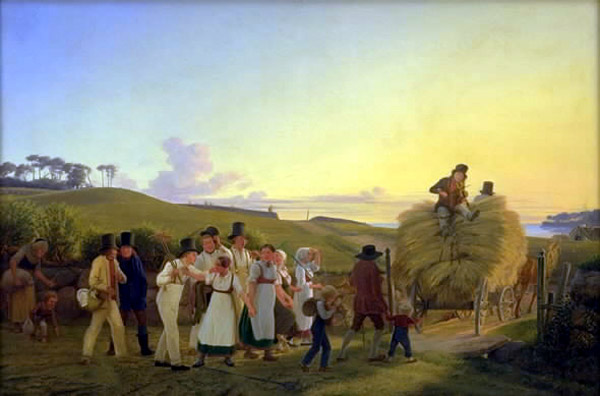
Farmers Return Home from the Field with the Final Sheaves of Grain (1845)

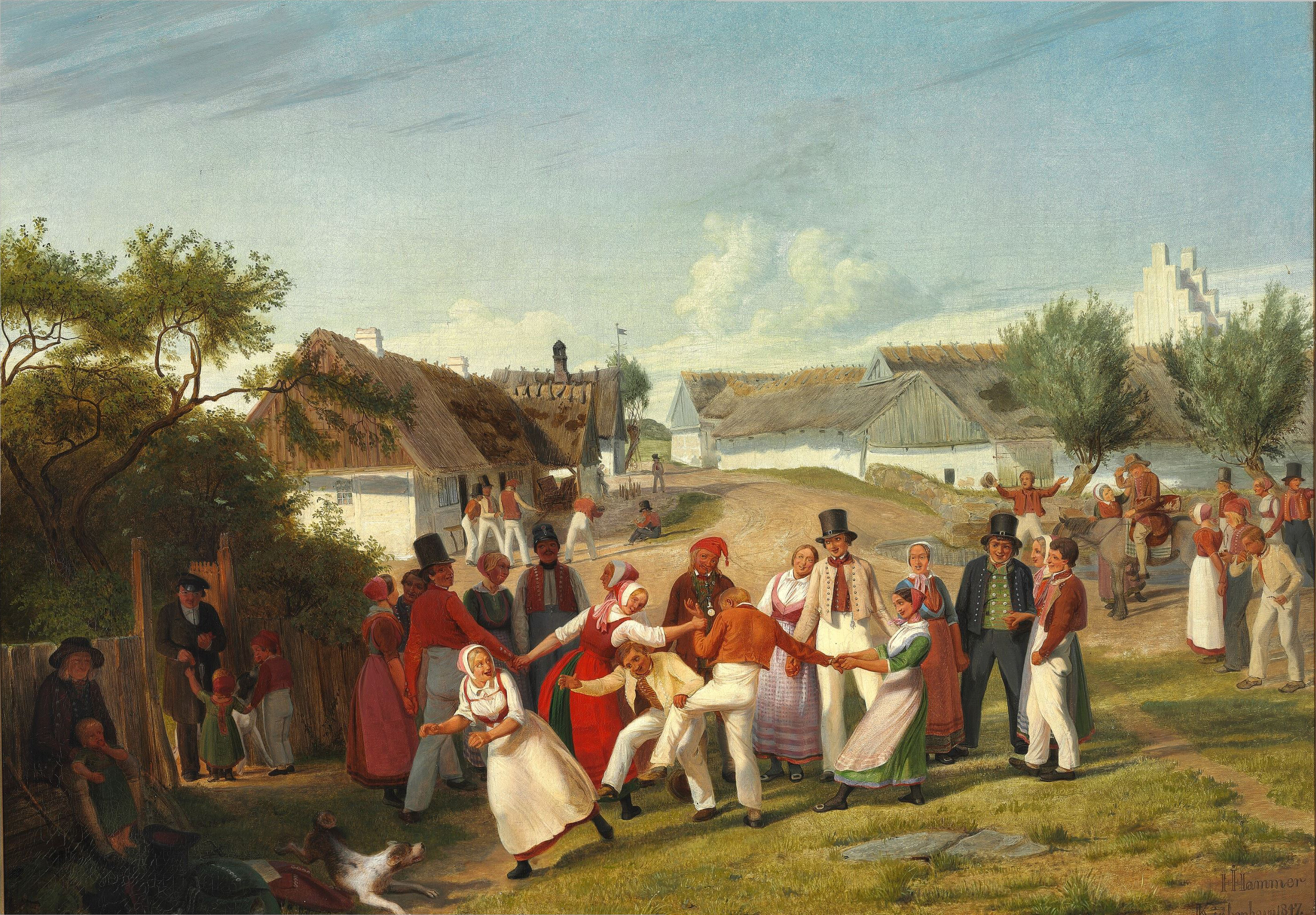
Farmboys and Girls Gather for Outdoor Merrymaking on a Holiday Afternoon (1847)

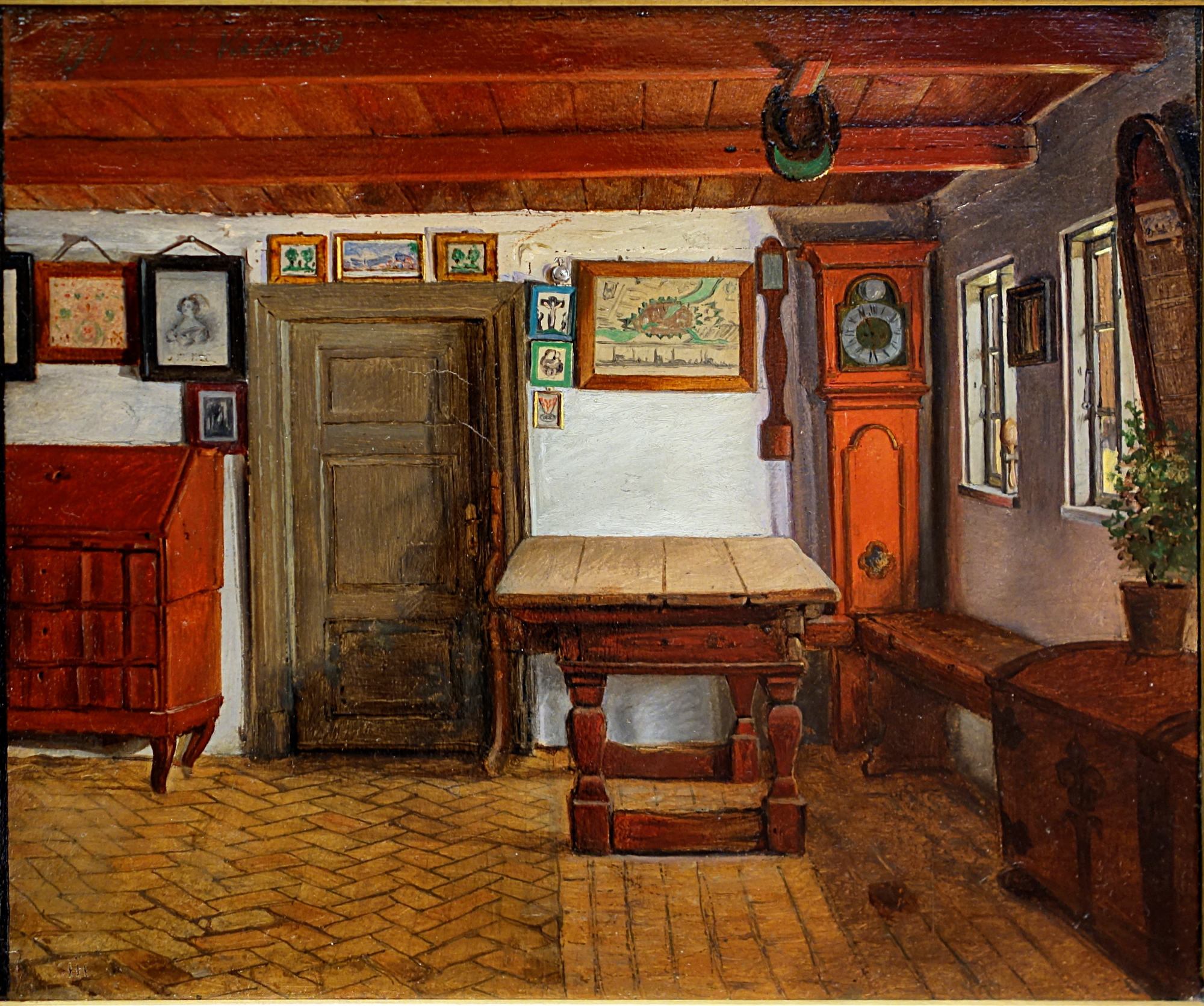
Farmhouse Interior
(undated)

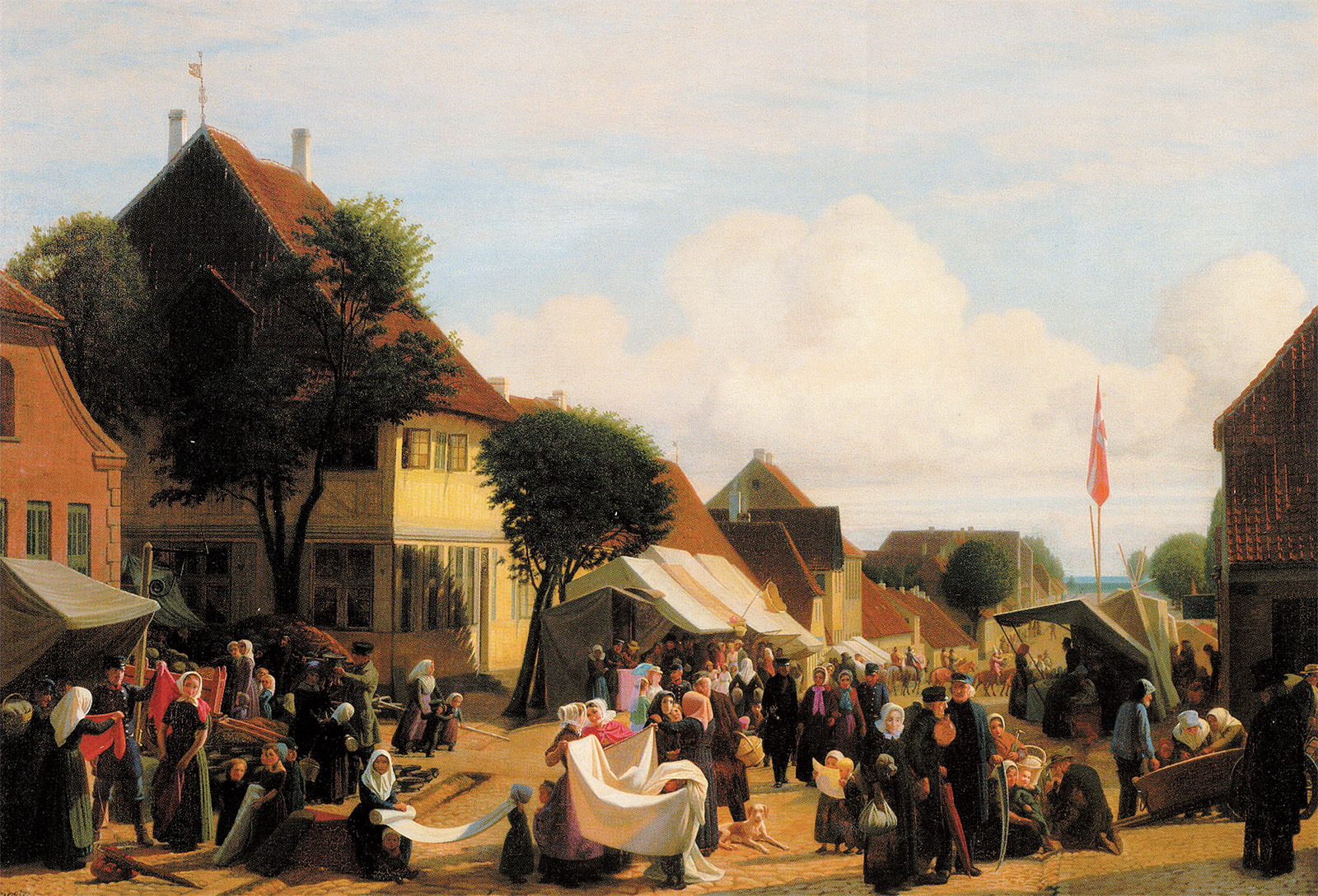
Market Day in Fredericia
(undated)

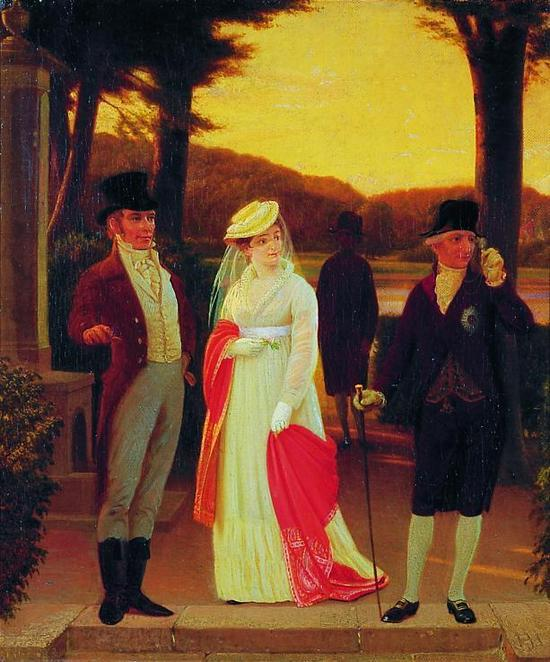
Baggesen and Schimmelmann (1872)
Italian Motifs

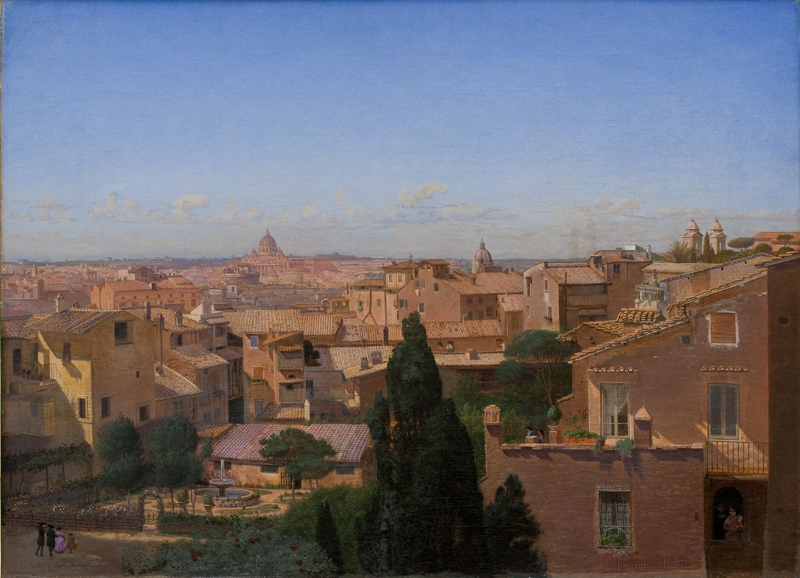
View of Rome from the Artist's Dwelling
(1858)

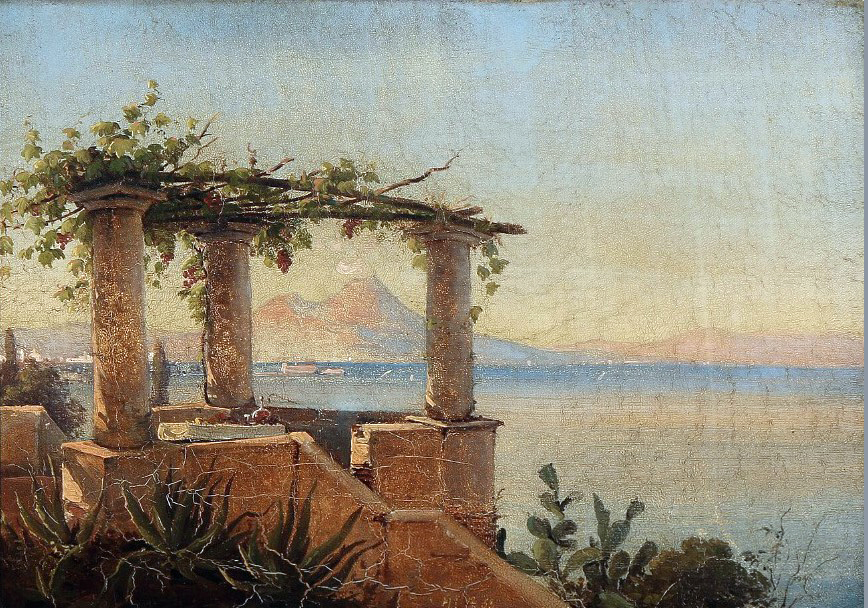
Coastal Landscape
(1858)

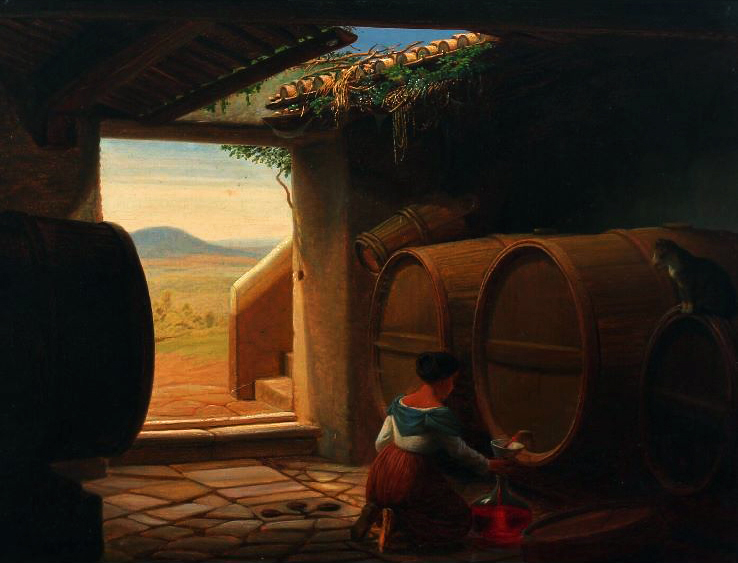
Woman Tapping Red Wine
(undated)

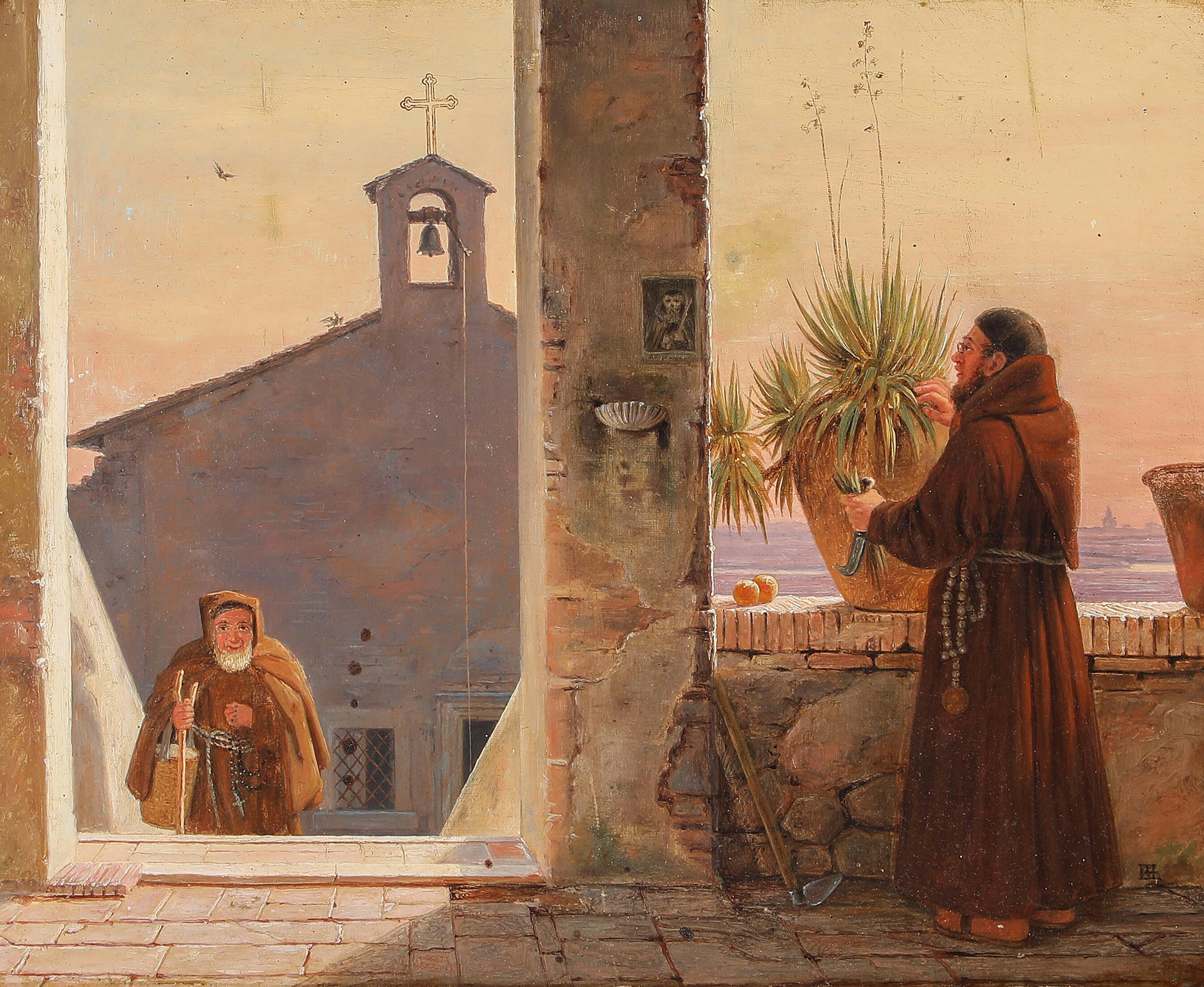
Motif from Italy with Monks
(undated)

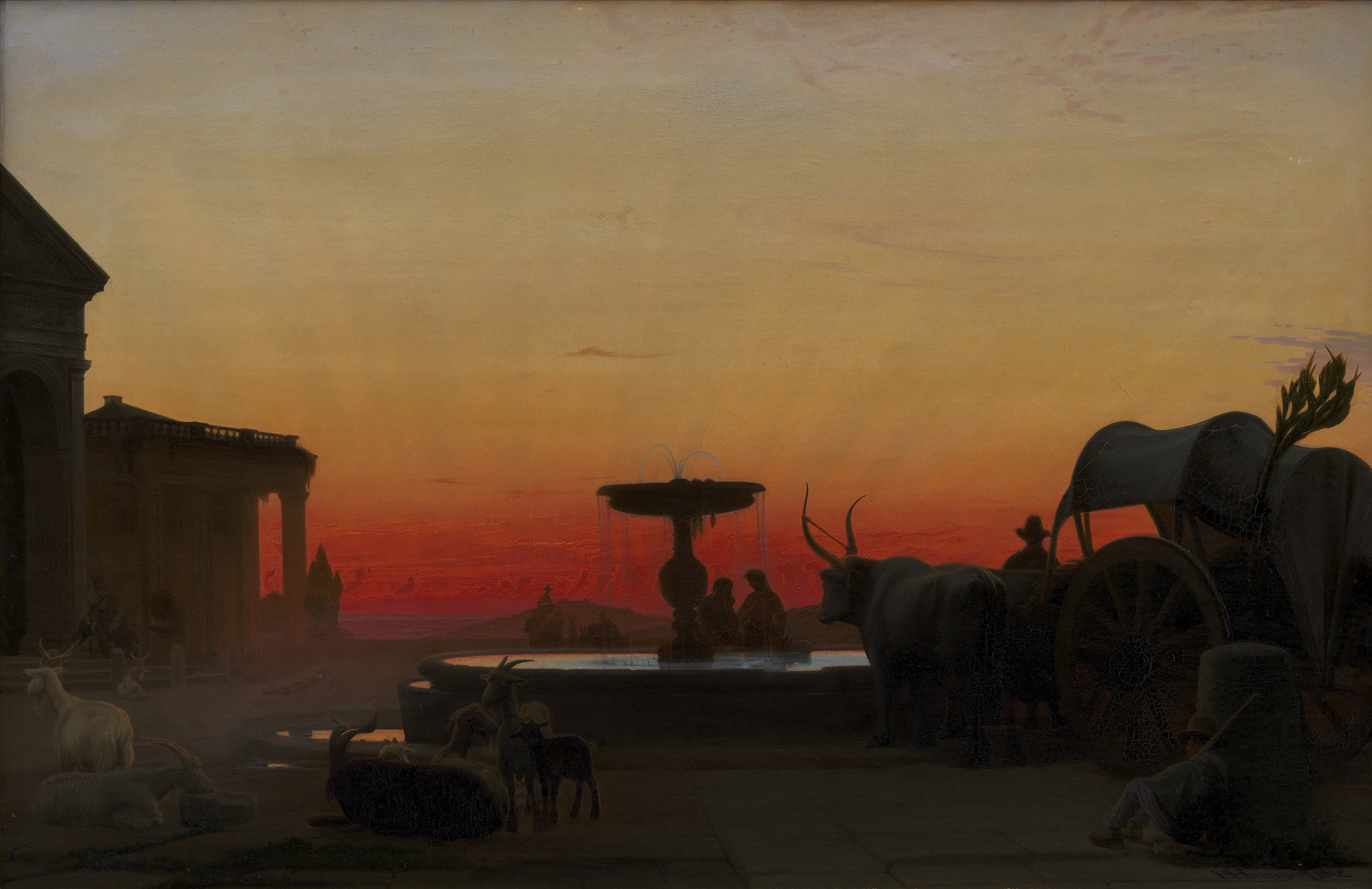
A Square in Ariccia after Sunset
(1862)
Studio Motifs

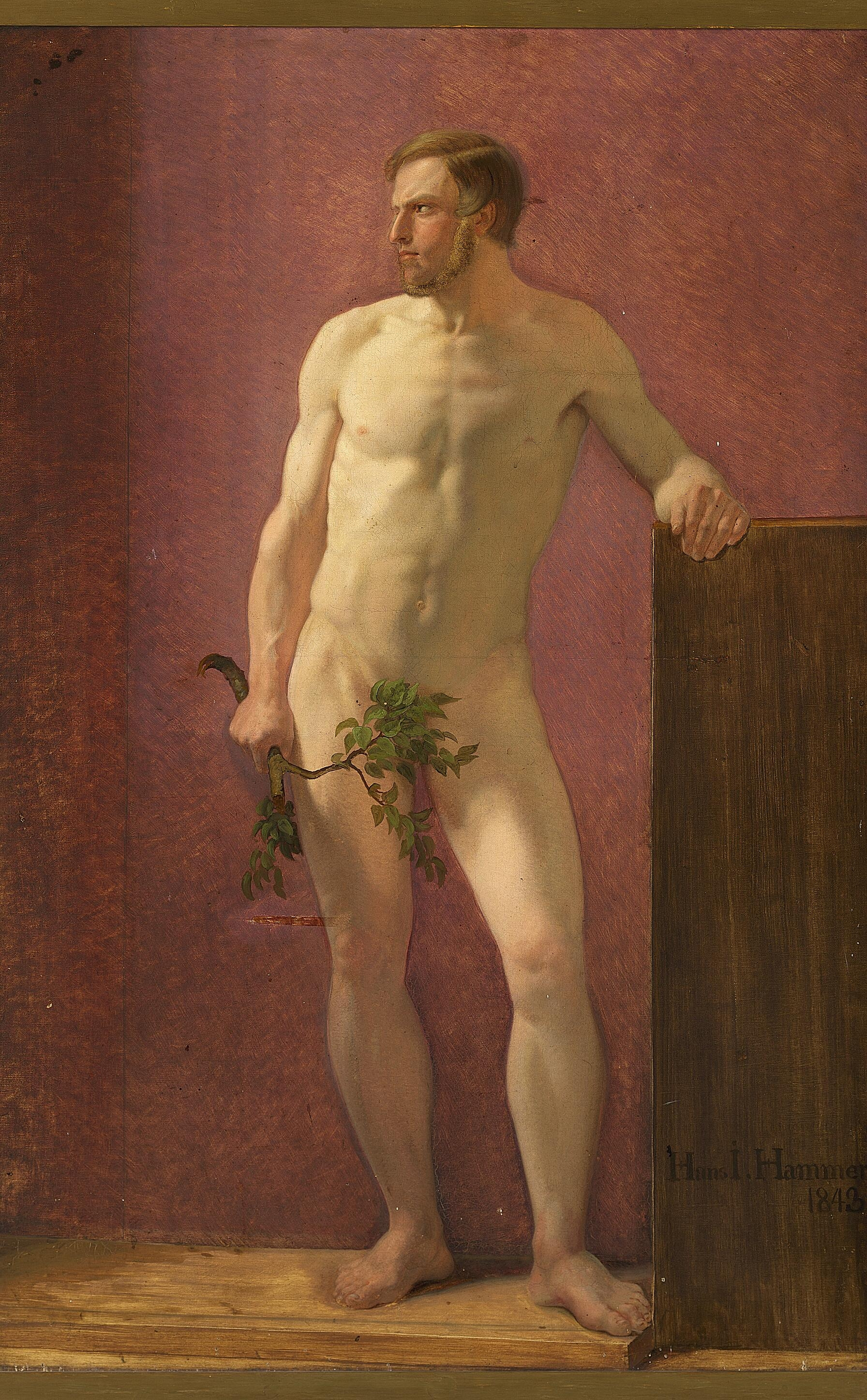
Study of a Young Male Model with a Branch in His Hand (1843)

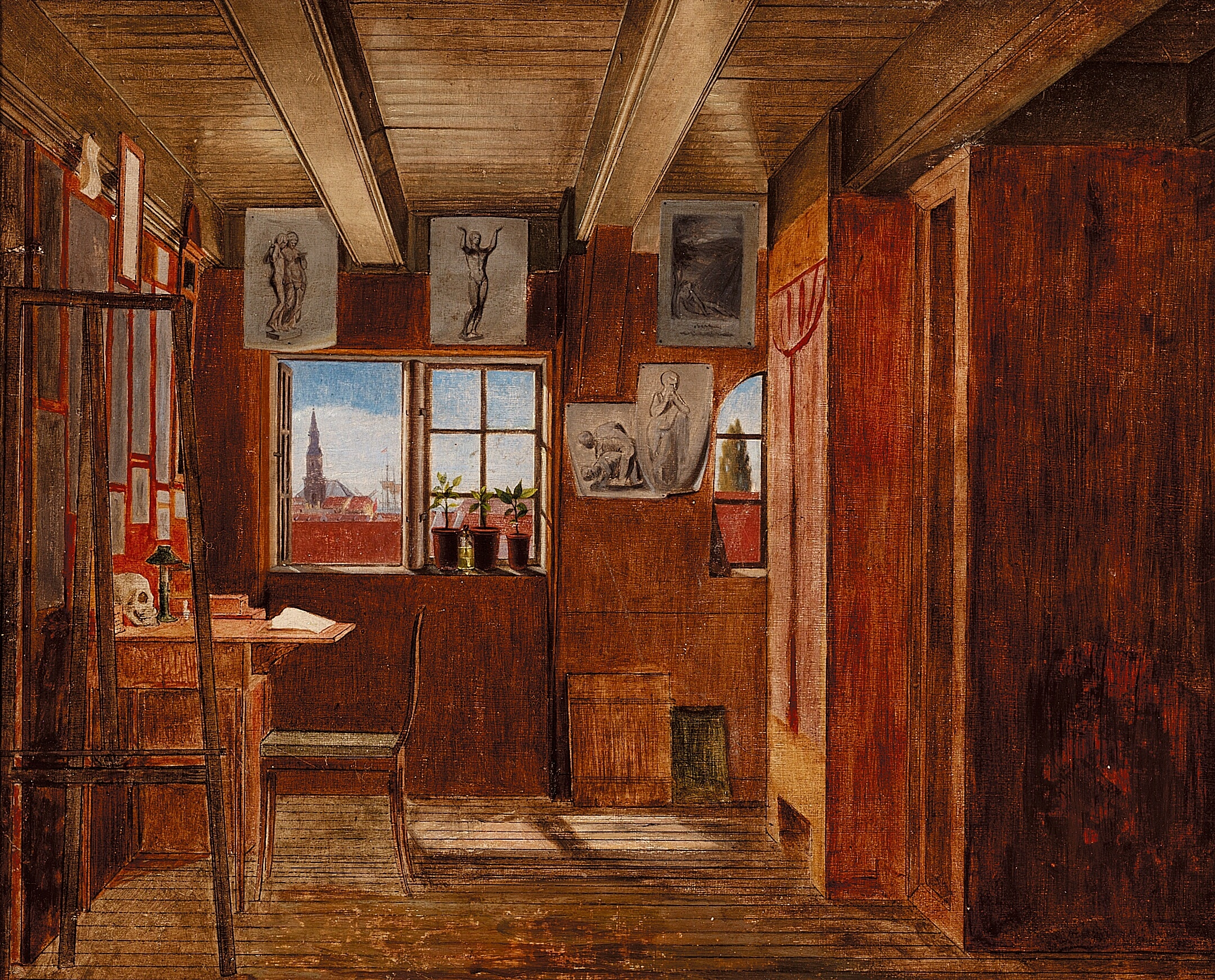
The Artist's Studio in Nyhavn Overlooking Christian's Church and a Ship on the Canal (undated)

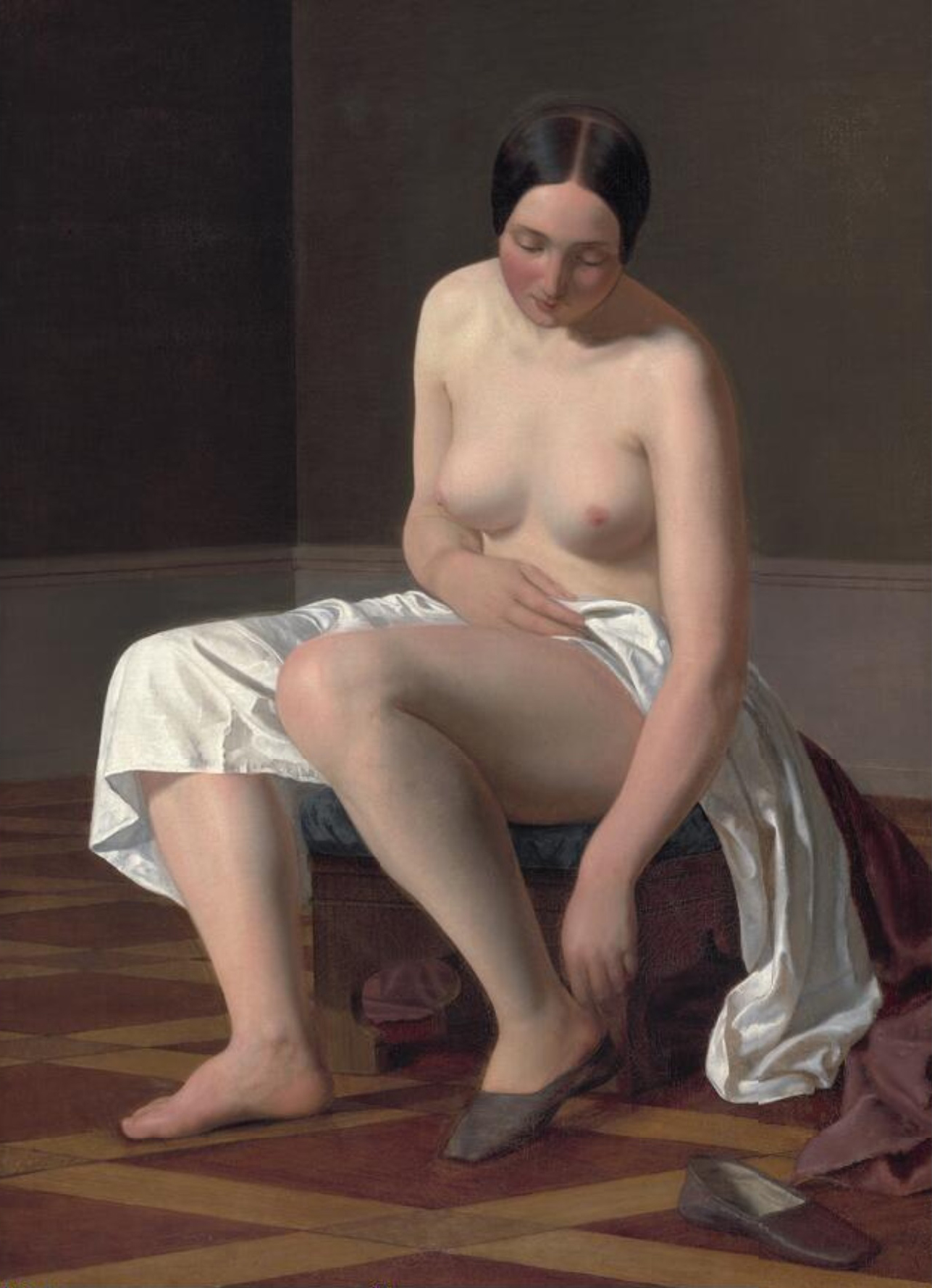
Girl with Slippers – Model Study of Madam Hack (1843)
