= William R. Hammer =

American paleontologist

- Born: Detroit, Michigan, United States
- Education: Wayne State University (Ph.D., M.S., and B.S.)
- Known for: Fossil vertebrates of Antarctica including Cryolophosaurus
- Awards: Laureate of The Lincoln Academy of Illinois, Order of Lincoln (2013) in the area of Education, Antarctic Service Medal
- Scientific career
- Fields: Paleontology
- Workplaces: Augustana College, IL, Field Museum of Natural History

William Roy Hammer is an American paleontologist who is co-credited with the discovery of the first carnivorous dinosaur unearthed in Antarctica, Cryolophosaurus, in 1991. He was professor of geology and curator of the Frxyell Geology Museum at Augustana College in Rock Island, IL from 1981 to 2017.

== Biography ==
Hammer was born in Detroit, Michigan and attended Wayne State University where he earned a bachelor's degree and masters in Zoology and completed a doctorate in Paleontology. As a student researcher, he was introduced to the study of fossil vertebrates in Antarctica by his advisor, Dr. John Cosgriff.

== Contributions to paleontology ==
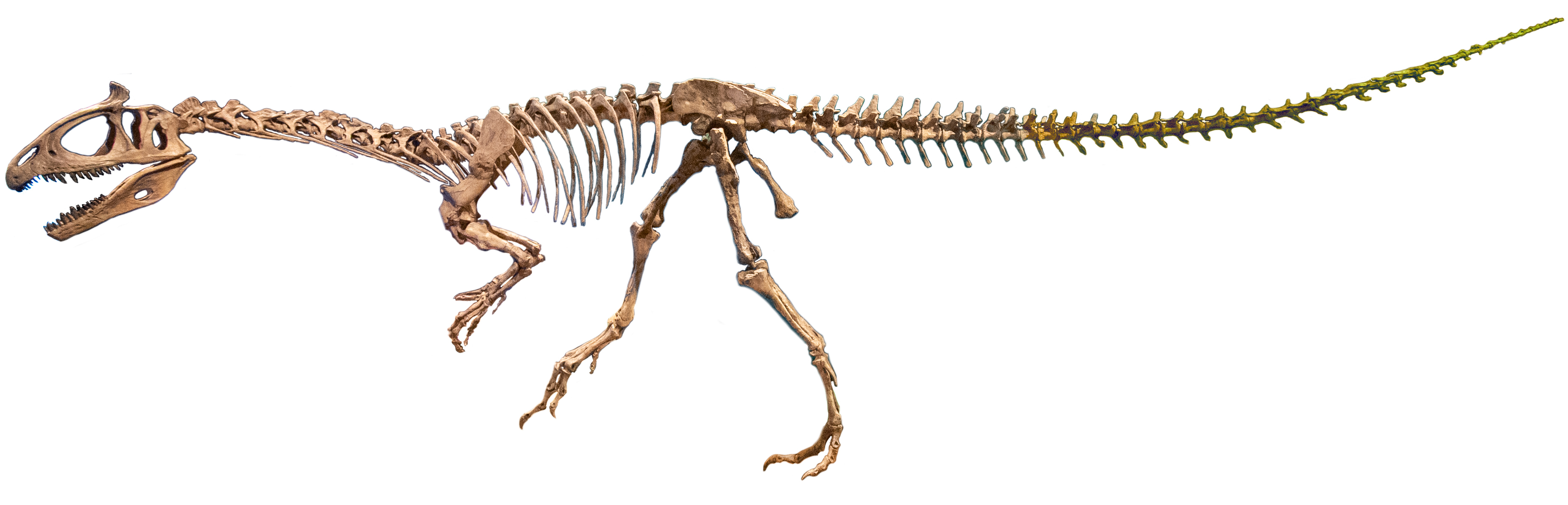
Cast of Cryolophosaurus ellioti

Hammer was part of eight expeditions to Antarctica between 1977 and 2017. In 1991, Ohio State University geologist David Elliot was studying igneous rocks on Mt. Kirkpatrick near the Beardmore Glacier in Antarctica when he found some scree that contained bone. Hammer, who was working on synapsids fossils nearby, investigated the site and found the femur of a large theropod dinosaur exposed from the rock. The quarry later produced a skull with a unique head crest that was described in 1994 as belonging to a new genus and species, Cryolophosaurus ellioti.

Hammer also collected the partial remains of a sauropodmoropha dinosaur. When the specimen (a partial foot, leg and ankle bones) was later described and a new genus and species named, Glacialisaurus hammeri, it was to honor Dr. Hammer for his contributions to vertebrate paleontology and Antarctic research.
