= List of glaciers of the Ross Dependency =

Location of the Ross Dependency

Following is a list of glaciers of the Ross Dependency in Antarctica. There are a great many glaciers in the Ross Dependency, not all of which have been named. This list may not reflects recent namings.

== King Edward VII Land ==
King Edward VII Land is a peninsula in the Ross Dependency.

- Blades Glacier
- Butler Glacier
- Cumbie Glacier
- Dalton Glacier
- Gerry Glacier
- Hamilton Glacier
- Kiel Glacier
- Larson Glacier
- Richter Glacier
- Stewart Glacier
- Withrow Glacier

== Other ==
- Albanus Glacier
- Algie Glacier
- Alice Glacier
- Amundsen Glacier
- Ant Hill Glacier
- Ashworth Glacier
- Aurora Glacier
- Axel Heiberg Glacier
- Baldwin Glacier
- Barne Glacier
- Baronick Glacier
- Barrett Glacier
- Bartlett Glacier
- Beardmore Glacier
- Beaver Glacier
- Bertoglio Glacier
- Berwick Glacier
- Bingley Glacier
- Blackwall Glacier
- Bondeson Glacier
- Bowin Glacier
- Bowman Glacier
- Brandau Glacier
- Brunner Glacier
- Burgess Glacier
- Byrd Glacier
- Canyon Glacier
- Cappellari Glacier
- Carlyon Glacier
- Christy Glacier
- Cleaves Glacier
- Cocks Glacier
- Cohen Glacier
- Cooper Glacier
- Cornwall Glacier
- Cunningham Glacier
- Dale Glacier
- Darwin Glacier (Antarctica)
- DeBreuck Glacier
- DeGanahl Glacier
- Delta Glacier
- Devils Glacier
- Dick Glacier
- Dickey Glacier
- Dilemma Glacier
- Dorrer Glacier
- Doss Glacier
- Eastwind Glacier
- Ekblad Glacier
- Endeavour Piedmont Glacier
- Epler Glacier
- Erebus Glacier
- Erickson Glacier
- Errant Glacier
- Evans Glacier
- Evteev Glacier
- Falkenhof Glacier
- Fang Glacier
- Fegley Glacier
- Forman Glacier
- Gallup Glacier
- Gamble Glacier
- Garrard Glacier
- Gatlin Glacier
- Gerasimou Glacier
- Gillespie Glacier
- Good Glacier
- Goodale Glacier
- Gough Glacier
- Haas Glacier
- Hamilton Glacier
- Harwell Glacier
- Heidemann Glacier
- Heilman Glacier
- Held Glacier
- Helm Glacier
- Hewitt Glacier
- Hewson Glacier
- Hoffman Glacier
- Holdsworth Glacier
- Holzrichter Glacier
- Hood Glacier
- Jacobsen Glacier
- Jensen Glacier
- Jorda Glacier
- Kehle Glacier
- Keltie Glacier
- Kent Glacier
- King Glacier
- Koerwitz Glacier
- Kosco Glacier
- Koski Glacier
- Krank Glacier
- Krout Glacier
- Laird Glacier
- LaVergne Glacier
- Law Glacier
- Le Couteur Glacier
- Leigh Hunt Glacier
- Lennox-King Glacier
- Linehan Glacier
- Liv Glacier
- Logie Glacier
- Lowe Glacier
- Lower Jaw Glacier
- Lower Staircase
- Lowery Glacier
- Lucy Glacier
- Ludeman Glacier
- McCuistion Glacier
- McGregor Glacier
- Mackellar Glacier
- Marsh Glacier
- Mason Glacier
- Massam Glacier
- Mill Glacier
- Mill Stream Glacier
- Millington Glacier
- Mincey Glacier
- Minerva Glacier
- Moffett Glacier
- Montgomerie Glacier
- Moody Glacier
- Morris Glacier
- Morton Glacier
- Muck Glacier
- Mulock Glacier
- Nimrod Glacier
- Norway Glacier
- Nottarp Glacier
- Nursery Glacier
- Osicki Glacier
- Otago Glacier
- Pavlak Glacier
- Perez Glacier
- Poulter Glacier
- Prebble Glacier
- Prince of Wales Glacier
- Rabot Glacier
- Ramsey Glacier
- Robb Glacier
- Roe Glacier
- Rowland Glacier
- Ruecroft Glacier
- Rutgers Glacier
- Rutkowski Glacier
- Sanctuary Glacier
- Sargent Glacier
- Schutt Glacier
- Shackleton Glacier
- Shanklin Glacier
- Shell Glacier
- Skelton Glacier
- Snakeskin Glacier
- Socks Glacier
- Somero Glacier
- Souchez Glacier
- Starshot Glacier
- Steagall Glacier
- Strom Glacier
- Stuckless Glacier
- Swinford Glacier
- Tate Glacier
- Tillite Glacier
- Tranter Glacier
- Trepidation Glacier
- Upper Staircase
- Vandament Glacier
- Vaughan Glacier
- Wahl Glacier
- Wyckoff Glacier
- Yeats Glacier
- Zaneveld Glacier
- Zotikov Glacier
