= Taylors Hill (disambiguation) =

Taylors Hill is a common name for Taurere / Taylor Hill, a volcanic hill in Auckland, New Zealand.

Taylors Hill may also refer to:

== Australasia ==
=== Australia ===
- Taylors Hill, Victoria, a suburb in Melbourne

== Europe ==
=== England ===
- Taylors Hill, locality in Chilham
- Taylors Hill, locality in Hitchin

=== Ireland ===
- Taylors Hill, a suburb in Galway

== See also ==
- Taylor Hill (disambiguation)
- Taylor Hills (Antarctica)
- Taylor Hills, Montana, USA
