= Lowe Glacier =

Glacier in Antarctica

Lowe Glacier (82°58′S 160°25′E) is a tributary glacier 7 nautical miles (13 km) long in the Queen Elizabeth Range, Antarctica. It flows south from a common saddle with the Prince of Wales Glacier 3 nautical miles (6 km) east of Mount Gregory to join the Princess Anne Glacier. The name was proposed by the Holyoake, Cobham and Queen Elizabeth Ranges Party of the New Zealand Geological Survey Antarctic Expedition, 1964–65, after David Lowe, a member of the party.
