= Krank Glacier =

Glacier in Antarctica

Krank Glacier (83°8′S 162°5′E) is a glacier 5 nautical miles (9 km) long, flowing east to enter Helm Glacier just south of Mount Macbain in the Queen Elizabeth Range of Antarctica. It was named by the Advisory Committee on Antarctic Names for Joseph P. Krank, Weather Central meteorologist at Little America V Station in the winter of 1957.
