= Ārai Terraces =

Series of crevassed terraces and icefalls in Antarctica

- Location within Antarctica

Geography
- Continent: Antarctica
- Range coordinates: 83°12′S 163°36′E
- Parent range: Queen Elizabeth Range

The Ārai Terraces (83°12′S 163°36′E) are a series of crevassed terraces and icefalls close southward of Fazekas Hills, near the head of Lowery Glacier.

== Name ==
The Ārai Terraces were so named by the New Zealand Geological Survey Antarctic Expedition (NZGSAE; 1959–60) because they are a natural barrier to sledge travel which the party was unable to traverse, ārai being the Māori term for barrier.

== Location ==
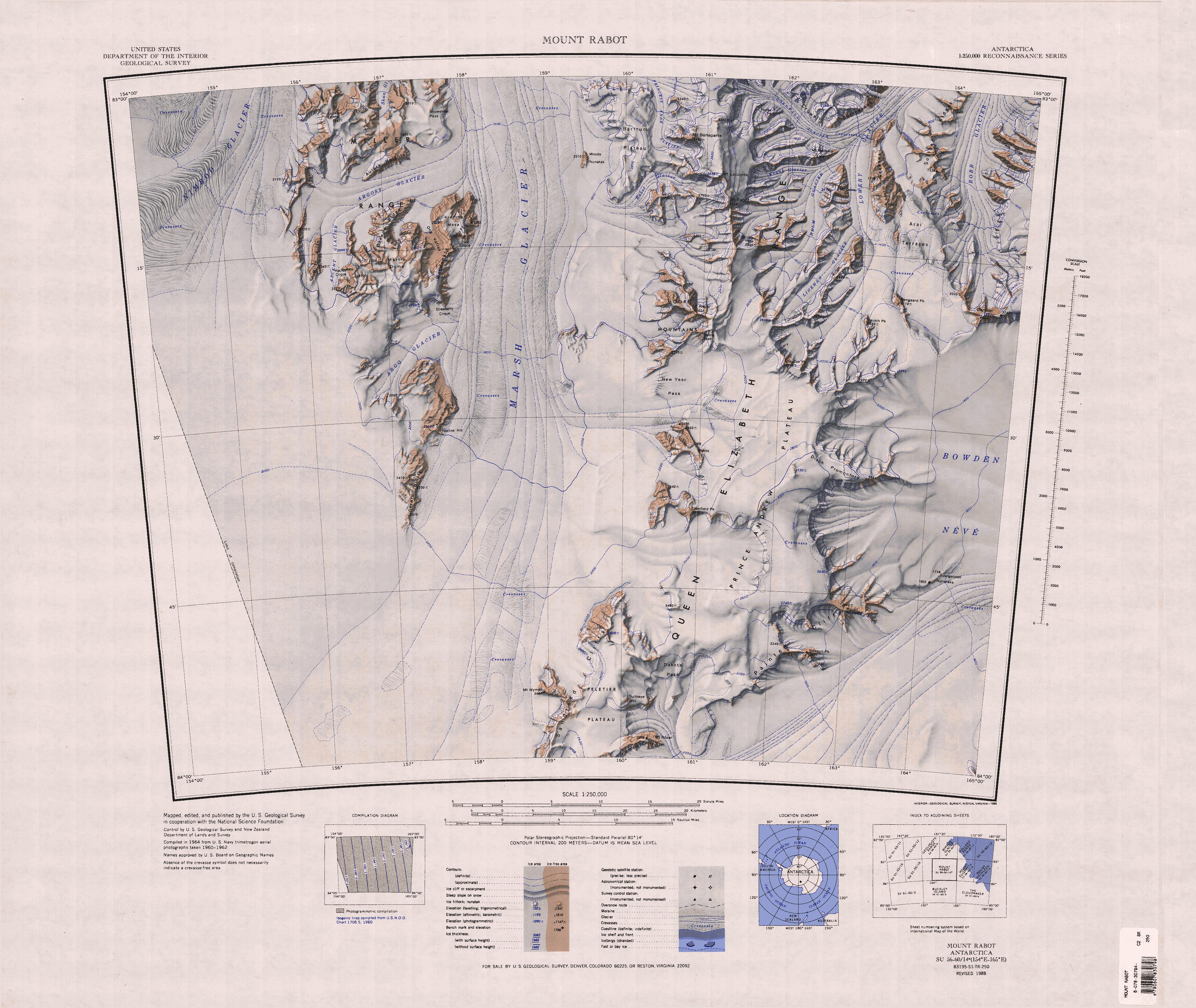
Peletier Plateau in southwest of map

The Ārai Terraces are in the eastern Queen Elizabeth Range to the northeast of the Prince Andrew Plateau, east of the Moore Mountains and Mount Rabot. The Linehan Glacier and Lowery Glacier define the western boundary, and the Robb Glacier the eastern boundary. Features around the Ārai Terraces include Bengaard Peak to the south, Softbed Ridges, Fazekas Hills and Mount Oona to the north.

== Features ==
=== Bengaard Peak ===
83°19′S 163°29′E. Prominent rock peak, 2,110 metres (6,920 ft) high, located 6 nautical miles (11 km; 6.9 mi) south of Fazekas Hills, on the east side of Queen Elizabeth Range. Named by the United States Advisory Committee on Antarctic Names (US-ACAN) for Hans J. Bengaard, United States ArmyRP ionospheric scientist at Little America V, 1957.

=== Softbed Ridges ===
83°03′S 163°45′E. A series of parallel rock ridges interspaced by small snow-covered valleys, the whole trending north–south for about 15 nautical miles (28 km; 17 mi) and forming a portion of the divide between Lowery Glacier and Robb Glacier. The name was applied in about 1960 by New Zealand parties working in the area.

=== Fazekas Hills ===
83°08′S 163°10′E. Rugged, ice-free hills trending in a north–south direction for 9 nautical miles (17 km; 10 mi) just east of Mount Oona on the east side of Lowery Glacier. Named by US-ACAN for Stephen P. Fazekas, Sr., United States ArmyRP meteorologist at South Pole Station, 1958.

=== Mount Oona ===
83°09′S 162°36′E. A mountain, 2,170 metres (7,120 ft) high, at the north end of the ridge between Helm Glacier and Lowery Glacier. Named by US-ACAN for Henn Oona, United States ArmyRP aurora scientist at South Pole Station, 1964.

== Sources ==
- Alberts, Fred G., ed. (1995), Geographic Names of the Antarctic (PDF) (2 ed.), United States Board on Geographic Names This article incorporates public domain material from websites or documents of the United States Board on Geographic Names.
- Mount Rabot, USGS: United States Geological Survey
- This article incorporates public domain material from websites or documents of the United States Geological Survey.
