= DeBreuck Glacier =

Glacier in Antarctica

DeBreuck Glacier (82°53′S 162°50′E) is a glacier, 8 nautical miles (15 km) long, which is a southern tributary to Kent Glacier in the Queen Elizabeth Range. It was mapped by the United States Geological Survey from tellurometer surveys and Navy air photos, 1960–62, and was named by the Advisory Committee on Antarctic Names for William DeBreuck, a United States Antarctic Research Program (USARP) Belgian glaciologist at the South Pole Station, 1962–63.

DeBreuck was a member of the USARP South Pole—Queen Maud Land Traverse III (SPQMLT-3) 1967–68, and the first Belgian researcher to set foot on the Polar Plateau.
