= Prince Edward Glacier =

Glacier in Antarctica

Prince Edward Glacier (82°46′S 159°32′E) is a glacier draining the north side of Cotton Plateau in the Queen Elizabeth Range and flowing north for about 6 nautical miles (11 km) along the west side of Hochstein Ridge. Named by New Zealand Antarctic Place-Names Committee (NZ-APC) for Prince Edward, Duke of Edinburgh, son of Elizabeth II of the United Kingdom.
