= Mount Wise =

Mount Wise may refer to:

- Mount Wise, Plymouth, an area in Devon, England
- Mount Wise (Antarctica), a summit in Victoria Land, Antarctica

== See also ==
- Mount Wyss, a peak in the Shackleton Coast of Antarctica
