= Withrow Glacier =

Glacier in Antarctica

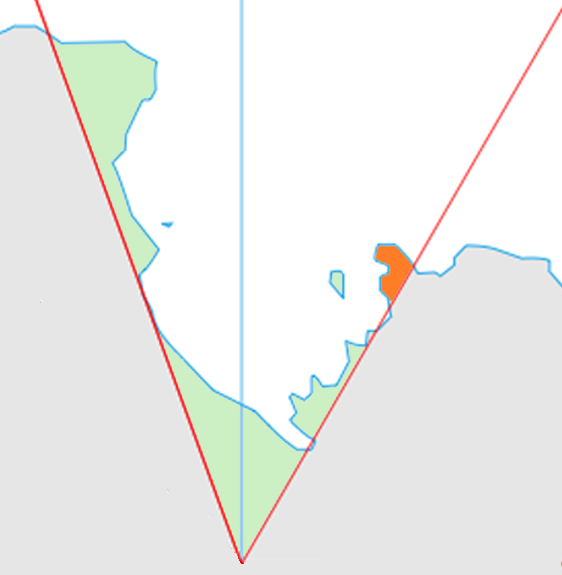
- Location of King Edward VII Land (marked in orange) within the Ross Dependency

- Location within Antarctica
- Location: King Edward VII Land
- Coordinates: 77°24′S 156°25′W
- Thickness: unknown
- Terminus: Bartlett Inlet
- Status: unknown

Withrow Glacier (77°24′S 156°25′W) is a glacier on Edward VII Peninsula, flowing northwest into Bartlett Inlet just east of Cape Colbeck. Mapped from surveys by the United States Geological Survey (USGS) and U.S. Navy air photos (1959–65). Named by Advisory Committee on Antarctic Names (US-ACAN) for Commander W.H. Withrow, U.S. Navy, of the staff of the Commander, Naval Support Force, Antarctica, who was officer in charge of Detachment One at Christchurch, New Zealand, 1965–66.

== See also ==
- List of glaciers in the Antarctic
- Glaciology
