= Robb Glacier =

Glacier in Antarctica

- Location within Antarctica
- Coordinates: 82°38′S 165°0′E
- Length: 70 kilometres (43 mi)
- Terminus: Ross Ice Shelf

Robb Glacier (82°38′S 165°0′E) is a glacier about 40 nautical miles (70 km) long that flows through the Ross Dependency to enter the west coast of the Ross Ice Shelf in Antarctica.

== Location ==
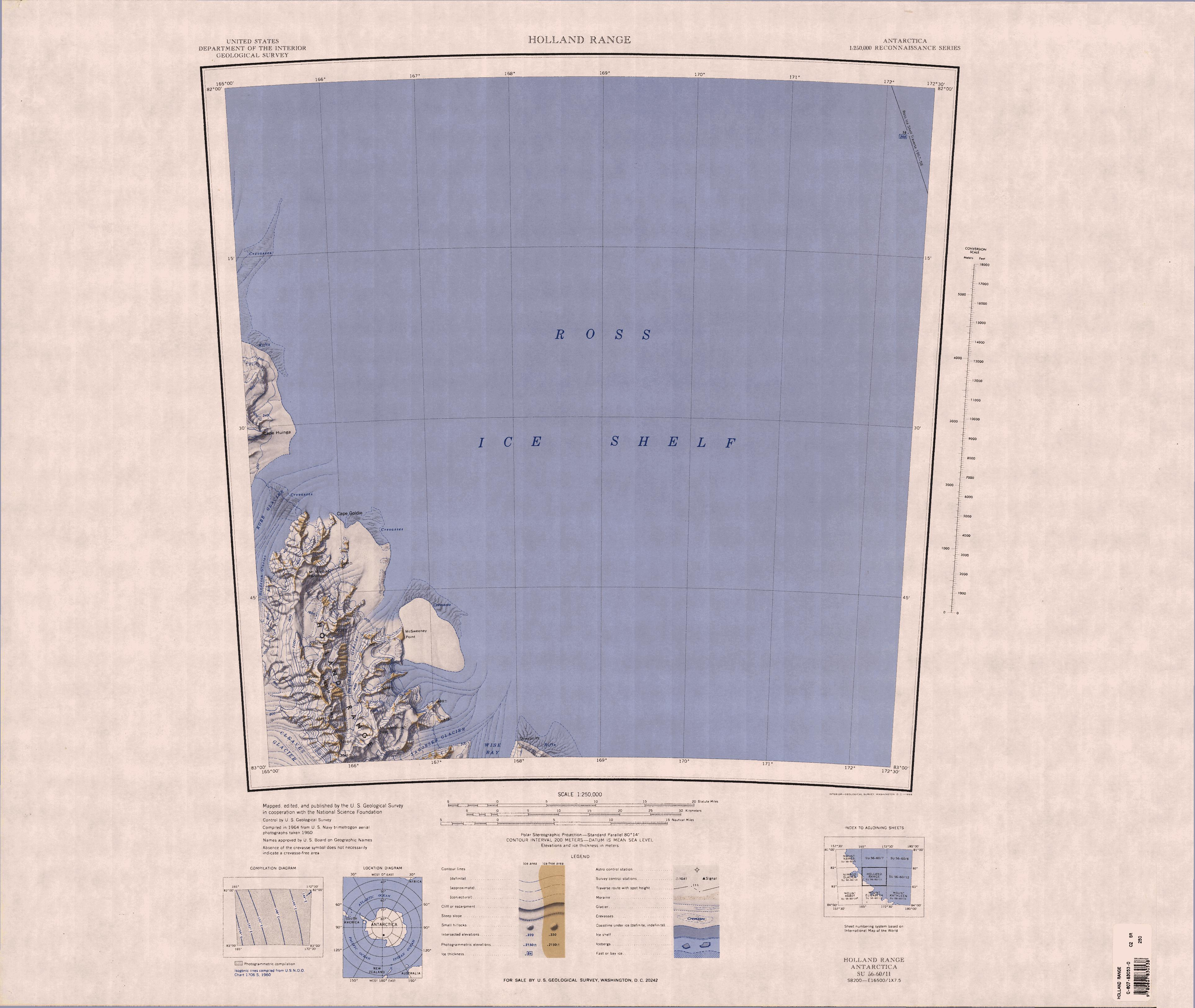
Mouth of Robb Glacier (northwest)

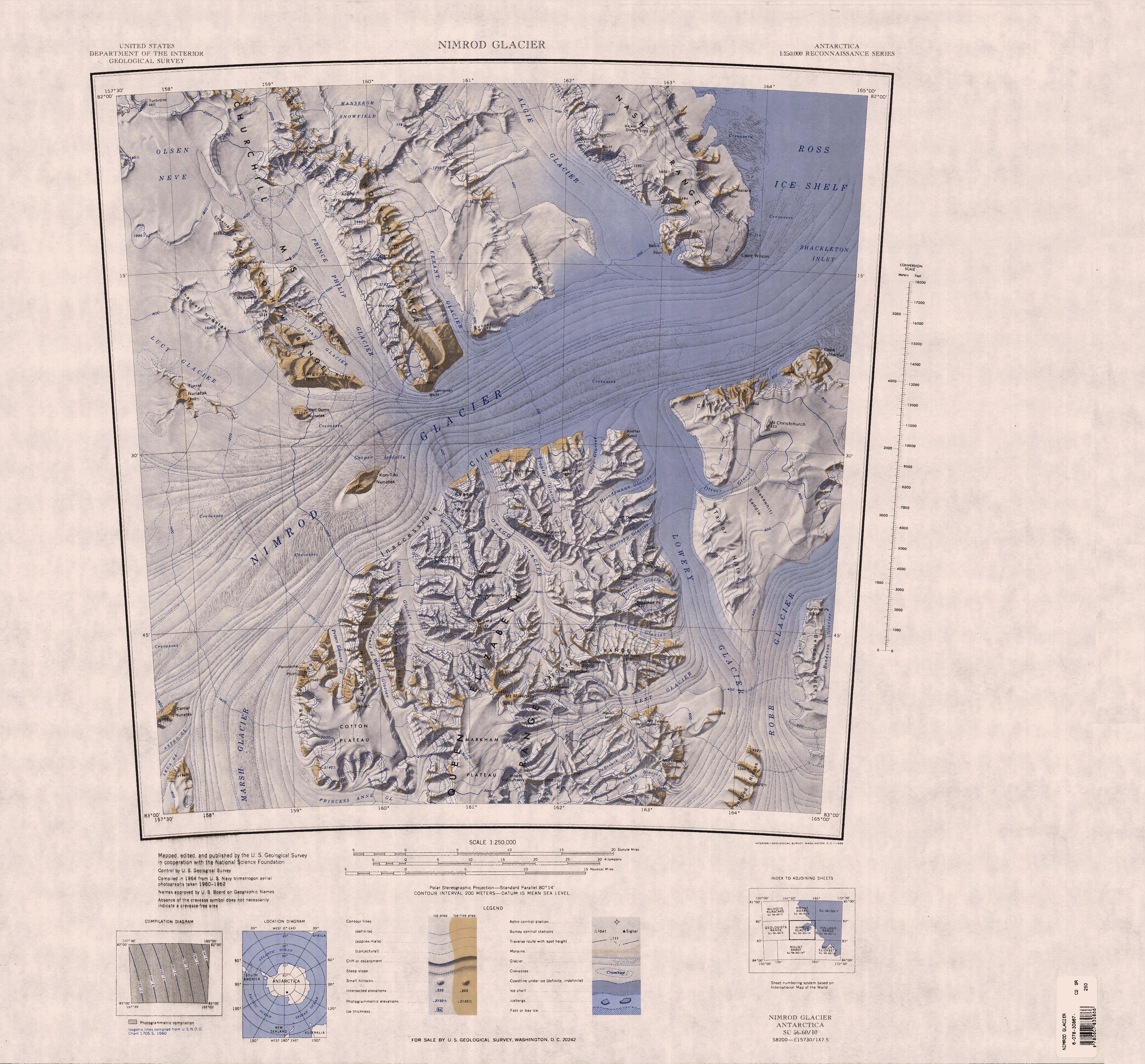
Nimrod Glacier and lower Robb Glacier (extreme east)

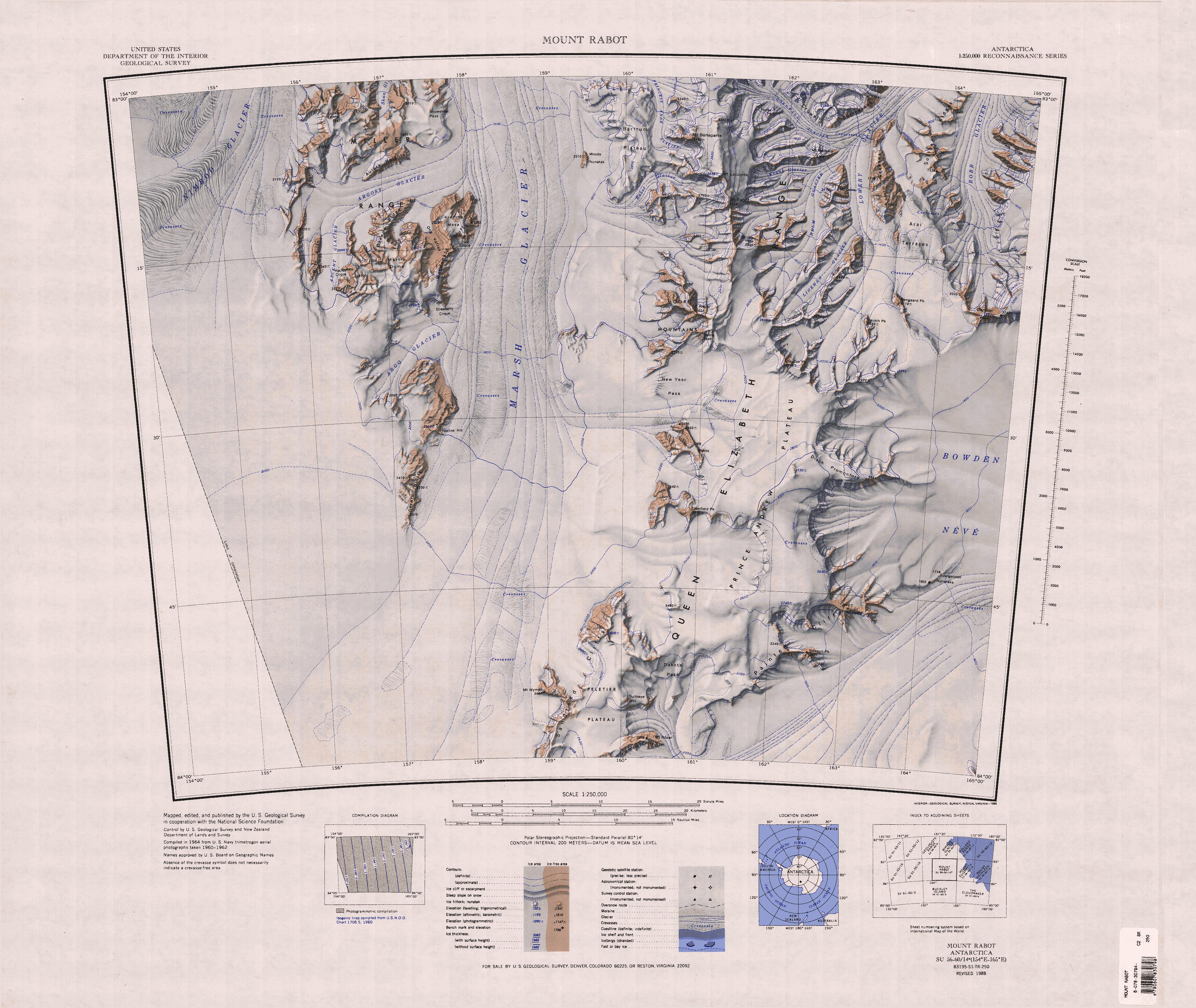
Queen Elizabeth Range and upper Robb Glacier (extreme east)

The Robb Glacier flows from Clarkson Peak north along the east side of Softbed Ridges to the Ross Ice Shelf at Cape Goldie. It flows between the Queen Elizabeth Range to the west and the Holland Range to the east. To the north of Softbed Ridges it converges with Lowery Glacier, which is to the west, but the two glaciers separate when they reach Taylor Hills. Its mouth is southeast of the Lowery Glacier and the Nimrod Glacier. It is north of the Lennox-King Glacier and the Beardmore Glacier.

Named by the expedition after Murray Robb, leader of the New Zealand Geological Survey Antarctic Expedition (NZGSAE) (1959–60), who traversed this glacier to reach Lowery Glacier.

== Mouth ==
=== Cape Goldie ===
82°38′S 165°54′E A cape at the south side of the mouth of Robb Glacier, overlooking the Ross Ice Shelf. Discovered by the BrNAE (1901–04) and named for Sir George Goldie, a member of the committee which made the final draft of the instructions for the expedition.

=== Cape Huinga ===
82°31′S 165°10′E. A bold cape overlooking the Ross Ice Shelf, at the north side of the mouth of Robb Glacier. The Southern Party of the NZGSAE (1959–60) assembled near the cape in November 1959, thus suggesting the name. Huinga is the Maori word for a gathering.

== Right tributaries ==
Tributaries entering the right (east) side of the glacier are:

=== Bondeson Glacier ===
82°44′S 165°00′E Glacier about 7 miles (11 km) long, flowing north along the east side of Benson Ridge into the lower portion of Robb Glacier. Mapped by the USGS from tellurometer surveys (1961–62) and Navy air photos (1960). Named by US-ACAN for W. Bondeson, Master of the USNS Pvt. John R. Towle during USN OpDFrz 1964 and 1965.

=== Cleaves Glacier ===
82°57′S 165°00′E A glacier in the Holland Range, flowing northwest from Mount Reid into the east side of Robb Glacier. Mapped by USGS from tellurometer surveys (1961–62) and Navy air photos (1960). Named by US-ACAN for Harold H. Cleaves, Master of the USNS Pvt. Joseph F. Merrell during OpDFrz 1964–65.

== Sources ==
- Alberts, Fred G., ed. (1995), Geographic Names of the Antarctic (PDF) (2 ed.), United States Board on Geographic Names This article incorporates public domain material from websites or documents of the United States Board on Geographic Names.
- Holland Range, USGS
- Mount Elizabeth, USGS
- Nimrod Glacier, USGS

This article incorporates public domain material from websites or documents of the United States Geological Survey.
