= Cape Lyttelton =

Cape along the Ross Ice Shelf, Antarctica

- Cape
- Location within Antarctica
- Coordinates: 82°21′S 164°39′E

Cape Lyttelton (82°21′S 164°39′E) is a cape forming the southern entrance point of Shackleton Inlet, along the western edge of the Ross Ice Shelf, Antarctica.

== Location ==
Cape Lyttelton lies between Cape Goldie and Shackleton Inlet, along the western edge of the Ross Ice Shelf, Antarctica. It is on an "island" formed where Lowery Glacier diverges from Ross Glacier. Lowery Glacier flows along the west of the island to join the Nimrod Glacier, which flows along the north of the island into Shackleton Inlet and the Ross Ice Shelf. Ross Glacier flows along the southeast of the island to the Ross Ice Shelf. The Holland Range is to the south, and the Queen Elizabeth Range to the east.

Cape Lyttelton was discovered by the British National Antarctic Expedition (1901–04) and named after Lyttelton, New Zealand. The Discovery started on the last lap of its journey south from Lyttelton, where very generous assistance was given the expedition. Robert Falcon Scott reports sighting the cape in his diary.

Wednesday, Nov. 29th. [1902] - Camp 25. Lat. 82 21. Things much better. The land showed up late yesterday; Mount Markham, a magnificent triple peak, appearing wonderfully close, Cape Lyttelton and Cape Goldie.

According to Sailing Directions for Antarctica (1976):

Mount Christchurch, about 4,700 feet high, lies northeastward of Mount Markham, and from this peak the high land descends in a wide snow plateau covering the foothills to Cape Lyttelton (Cape Lyttleton), the southern entrance point of Shackleton Inlet. Southward of this cape stands Mount Longstaff, about 10,350 feet high, which as seen from the northward has two sharp peaks.

== Features ==
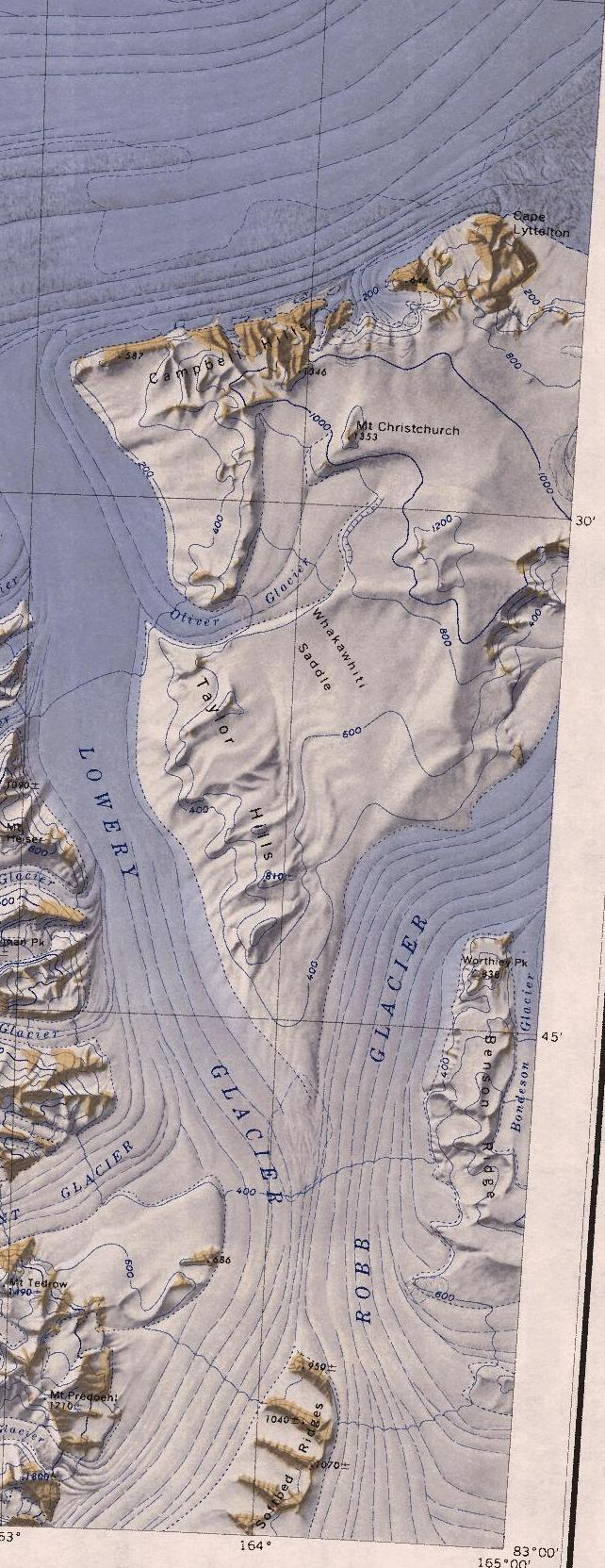
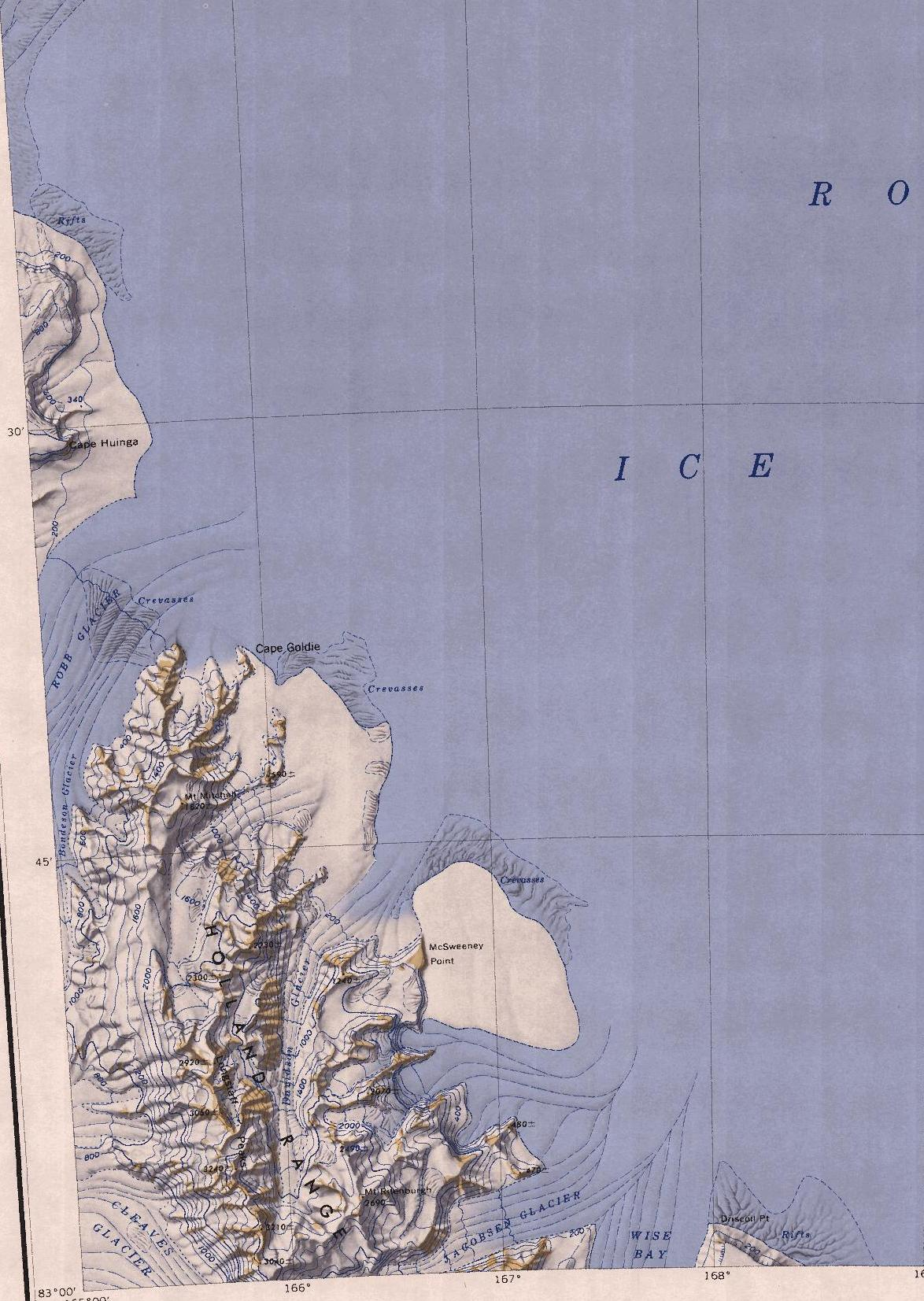
Cape Lyttelton region. "Island" in the northwest.

The island holds Campbell Hills, Mount Christchurch, Oliver Glacier, Taylor Hills and Whakawhiti Saddle.

=== Campbell Hills ===
82°26′S 163°47′E. Group of hills 5 miles (8.0 km) west-south-west of Cape Lyttelton on the south side of Nimrod Glacier. Mapped by the USGS from tellurometer surveys and Navy air photos, 1960-62. Named by US-ACAN for William J. Campbell, USARP glaciologist at the Ross Ice Shelf, 1962-63.

=== Seelig Peak ===
82.4333333°S 163.9666667°E. An ice-free peak, 1,346 metres (4,416 ft) high, which marks the summit of Campbell Hills on the southern side of Nimrod Glacier. The peak stands 2.5 miles (4.0 km) northwest of Mount Christchurch, a mountain named after Christchurch, New Zealand, by Captain R.F. Scott’s British National Antarctic Expedition (BrNAE), 1901-04. In 2005, in association with Mount Christchurch, the New Zealand Geographic Board named this peak after Walter R. Seelig (1919-2005), the National Science Foundation Representative in Christchurch during eleven U.S. Antarctic Research Program (USARP) austral deployments between 1971 and 1986 (Mount Seelig, q.v.). Seelig was accompanied in the Christchurch sojourns by his wife, Josephine Seelig.

=== Mount Christchurch ===
82°28′S 164°10′E. Mountain, 1,355 metres (4,446 ft) high, standing 7 miles (11 km) southwest of Cape Lyttelton on the south side of Shackleton Inlet. Discovered by the BrNAE (1901-04) and named for the city of Christchurch, New Zealand, which generously supported the expedition.

=== Oliver Glacier ===
82°34′S 163°45′E. Glacier draining the area west and south of Mount Christchurch and entering Lowery Glacier just north of the Taylor Hills. Mapped by the USGS from tellurometer surveys and Navy air photos, 1960-62. Named by US-ACAN for Edward J. Oliver, USARP glaciologist at South Pole Station, 1961-62.

=== Taylor Hills ===
82°38′S 163°50′E. A line of ice-covered hills bordering the east side of Lowery Glacier between Oliver Glacier and Robb Glacier. Mapped by the USGS from tellurometer surveys and Navy air photos, 1960-62. Named by US-ACAN for Lawrence D. Taylor, USARP glaciologist at South Pole Station, 1963-64.

=== Whakawhiti Saddle ===
82°34′S 164°05′E. A low, broad snow saddle between Oliver Glacier and the lower portion of Robb Glacier, close east of Taylor Hills. Traversed by the southern party of the NZGSAE (1959-60) and so named because Whakawhiti is a Maori word meaning "crossing over."

== Sources ==
- Alberts, Fred G., ed. (1995), Geographic Names of the Antarctic (PDF) (2 ed.), United States Board on Geographic Names This article incorporates public domain material from websites or documents of the United States Board on Geographic Names.
- Holland Range, USGS
- Huntford, Roland, ed. (2010), Race for the South Pole: The Expedition Diaries of Scott and Amundsen, A&C Black, ISBN 9781441169822
- Nimrod Glacier, USGS
- Sailing Directions for Antarctica: Includes Islands South of Latitude 60.̊, United States. Defense Mapping Agency. Hydrographic Center, 1976
- "Seelig Peak", Geographic Names Information System, United States Geological Survey, United States Department of the Interior
