= Oliver Glacier =

Glacier in Nunavut, Canada

Coordinates: 72°07′05″N 076°47′53″W

Oliver Glacier is a glacier located on the northeast coast of the Baffin Mountains on Baffin Island, Nunavut, Canada. It is just outside Sirmilik National Park.

== See also ==
- List of glaciers
- Whakawhiti Saddle
