= Sherwin Peak =

Mountain in Antarctica

- Location within Antarctica

Highest point
- Coordinates: 82°37′S 161°48′E

Geography
- Continent: Antarctica
- Parent range: Queen Elizabeth Range

Sherwin Peak (82°37′S 161°48′E) is a peak, 2,290 metres (7,510 ft) high, surmounting the east side of Otago Glacier 5 nautical miles (9.3 km; 5.8 mi) southeast of Mount Chivers, in the north part of the Queen Elizabeth Range, Antarctica.

== Exploration and name ==
Sherwin Peak was mapped by the United States Geological Survey (USGS) from tellurometer surveys and Navy air photos, 1960–62. It was named by the United States Advisory Committee on Antarctic Names (US-ACAN) for James S. Sherwin, ionospheric scientist at Little America V, 1958.

== Location ==
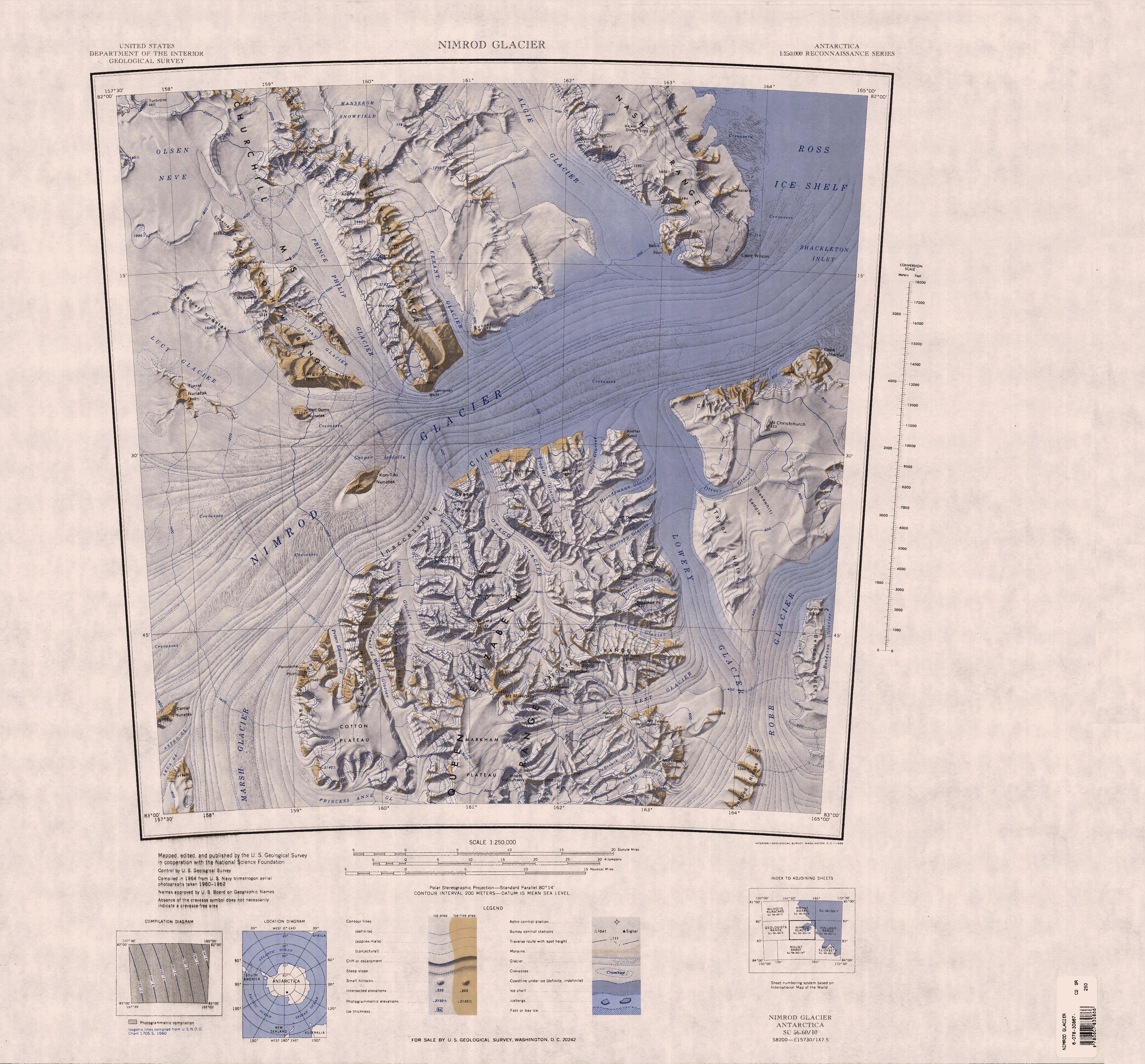
Cotton Plateau in southwest of map

Sherwin Peak is in the northeast of the Queen Elizabeth Range. It rises above Otago Glacier, which flows northwest along its southwest side to Nimrod Glacier. Nottarp Glacier and Heidemann Glacier are to the east and Tranter Glacier forms to the north of Sherwin Peak and flows north to Nimrod Glacier. Nearby features include Mount Chivers to the north, Mount Boman and Kieffer Knoll to the northeast, Mount Damm to the east and Mount Heiser and Kooyman Peak to the southeast.

== Features ==
=== Mount Chivers ===
82°32′S 161°26′E. A mountain, 1,755 metres (5,758 ft) high, standing between the mouths of Otago Glacier and Tranter Glacier. Mapped by the USGS from tellurometer surveys and Navy air photos, 1960–62. Named by US-ACAN for Hugh J.H. Chivers, United States ArmyRP upper atmosphere physicist at Byrd, South Pole and Hallett Stations, 1962–63.

=== Mount Boman ===
82°32′S 162°00′E. A mountain, 1,630 metres (5,350 ft) high, between Tranter Glacier and Doss Glacier. Mapped by the USGS from tellurometer surveys and Navy air photos, 1960–62. Named by US-ACAN for William M. Boman, United States ArmyRP traverse engineer at Roosevelt Island, 1962–63, and McMurdo Station, winter of 1965.

=== Kieffer Knoll ===
82°29′S 162°39′E. A rocky knoll which marks the extreme northeast corner of the Queen Elizabeth Range. Mapped by the USGS from tellurometer surveys and Navy air photos, 1960–62. Named by US-ACAN for Hugh H. Kieffer, United States ArmyRP glaciologist at Roosevelt Island, 1961–62.

=== Mount Damm ===
82°36′S 162°37′E. A snow-covered mountain, 1,130 metres (3,710 ft) high, between Heidemann Glacier and Nottarp Glacier. Mapped by the USGS from tellurometer surveys and Navy air photos, 1960–62. Named by US-ACAN for Robert Damm, United States ArmyRP biologist at McMurdo Station, 1963–64.

=== Mount Heiser ===
82°40′S 162°56′E. A mountain just north of Dorrer Glacier. Mapped by the USGS from tellurometer surveys and Navy air photos, 1960–62. Named by US-ACAN for Paul W. Heiser Jr., USARP aurora scientist Scott Base, 1959.

=== Kooyman Peak ===
82°43′S 162°49′E. A peak, 1,630 metres (5,350 ft) high, on the ridge just south of Dorrer Glacier. Mapped by the USGS from tellurometer surveys and Navy air photos, 1960–62. Named by the US-ACAN for Gerald L. Kooyman, United States ArmyRP biologist at McMurdo Station, 1961–62, 1963–64 and 1964–65.

== Sources ==
- Alberts, Fred G., ed. (1995), Geographic Names of the Antarctic (PDF) (2 ed.), United States Board on Geographic Names This article incorporates public domain material from websites or documents of the United States Board on Geographic Names.
- Nimrod Glacier, USGS: United States Geological Survey
- This article incorporates public domain material from websites or documents of the United States Geological Survey.
