= Holland Range =

Mountain range in Antarctica

- Location within Antarctica

Highest point
- Elevation: 4,160 m (13,650 ft)
- Prominence: 2,297 m (7,536 ft)
- Listing: Ultra, Ribu

Dimensions
- Length: 110 km (68 mi)

Geography
- Location: Antarctica
- Region: Ross Dependency
- Range coordinates: 83°10′S 166°0′E

The Holland Range (83°10′S 166°0′E) is a rugged coastal mountain range in the Ross Dependency, Antarctica, on the west coast of the Ross Ice Shelf. It is about 60 nautical miles (110 km) long.

== Location ==
The Holland Range lies just west of the Ross Ice Shelf and extends from Robb Glacier in the northeast to Lennox-King Glacier in the south. To the north of the range is the "island" that holds Cape Lyttelton. To the west, on the west side of Robb Glacier, is the Queen Elizabeth Range. To the south, across the Lennox-King Glacier, is the Queen Alexandra Range.

The range was named by the Ross Sea Committee for Sir Sidney Holland, who as Prime Minister of New Zealand supported that nation's participation in the Commonwealth Trans-Antarctic Expedition (1956–58).

== Glaciers ==
The Robb Glacier flows from Clarkson Peak north along the east side of Softbed Ridges to the Ross Ice Shelf at Cape Goldie. It flows between the Queen Elizabeth Range to the west and the Holland Range to the east. To the north of Softbed Ridges it converges with Lowery Glacier, which is to the west, but the two glaciers separate when they reach Taylor Hills. Bondeson Glacier flows north along the east side of Benson Ridge into the lower portion of Robb Glacier. Cleaves Glacier flows northwest from Mount Reid into the east side of Robb Glacier.

Further south down the coast, Davidson Glacier flows north along the east side of Longstaff Peaks into the Ross Ice Shelf. Jacobsen Glacier flows east-north-east Mount Reid into the Ross Ice Shelf. Ekblad Glacier flows from the east slopes of the Holland Range into Wise Bay, Ross Ice Shelf. Lennox-King Glacier is a large valley glacier, about 40 miles (64 km) long, that drains Bowden Névé and flows northeast between the Holland and Queen Alexandra Ranges to enter Richards Inlet on the Ross Ice Shelf. Several tributary glaciers in the Holland Range feed the Lennox-King Glacier.

=== Davidson Glacier ===
82°49′S 166°07′E. A glacier in the Holland Range, flowing north along the east side of Longstaff Peaks into the Ross Ice Shelf. }Mapped by the USGS from tellurometer surveys (1961-62) and Navy air photos (1960). Named by US-ACAN for Cdr. E.A. Davidson, USN, Commanding Officer of the USS Edisto during USN OpDFrz 1963.

=== Jacobsen Glacier ===
82°58′S 167°05′E. A glacier flowing east-north-east from Mount Reid, in the Holland Range, into the Ross Ice Shelf. Mapped by the USGS from tellurometer surveys (1961-62) and Navy air photos (1960). Named by US-ACAN for H. Jacobsen, Master of the USNS Chattahoochee during USN OpDFrz 1964 and 1965.

=== Ekblad Glacier ===
83°04′S 167°17′E. A glacier, 8 nautical miles (15 km; 9.2 mi) long, flowing from the east slopes of the Holland Range into Wise Bay, Ross Ice Shelf. Named by US-ACAN for A. Ekblad, Master of the USNS Wyandot during USN OpDFrz, 1964 and 1965.

=== Wise Bay ===
83°02′S 167°35′E. An ice-filled inlet at the terminus of Ekblad Glacier, opening on to the Ross Ice Shelf just west of Driscoll Point. Named by the NZGSAE (1959-60) for K.C. Wise, who was a member of the expedition and wintered over in 1959.

== Coastal features ==
=== Cape Goldie ===
82°38′S 165°54′E. A cape at the south side of the mouth of Robb Glacier, overlooking the Ross Ice Shelf. Discovered by the BrNAE (1901-04) and named for Sir George Goldie, a member of the committee which made the final draft of the instructions for the expedition.

=== McSweeney Point ===
82°49′S 166°40′E. A sharp rock point 3 miles (4.8 km) east of the terminus of Davidson Glacier, overlooking the Ross Ice Shelf. Mapped by the USGS from tellurometer surveys (1961-62) and Navy air photos (1960). Named by US-ACAN for Lt. R.H. McSweeney, USN, Commanding Officer of the USS Tombigbee during USN OpDFrz 1963.

=== Driscoll Point ===
82°59′S 168°00′E Point forming the east side of the entrance to Wise Bay, overlooking the Ross Ice Shelf. Mapped by the USGS from tellurometer surveys (1961-62) and Navy air photos (1960). Named by the US-ACAN after C.E. Driscoll, Master of the USNS Pvt. Joseph F. Merrell during USN OpDFrz 1963.

=== Vaughan Promontory ===
83°08′S 167°35′E. A high, rugged ice-covered promontory which extends eastward from Holland Range between Ekblad and Morton Glaciers. It terminates in Cape Maude overlooking Ross Ice Shelf. Named by US-ACAN for Cdr. V.J. Vaughan, USN, commanding officer of USS Glacier during OpDFrz 1964 and 1965.

=== Cape Maude ===
83°09′S 168°25′E. A high ice-covered cape forming the east end of Vaughan promontory, Holland Range, overlooking Ross Ice Shelf. Discovered by the BrAE (1907-09) and named for Col. LA. Maude, who donated the "Maudgee" pony ration for the expedition.

=== Lewis Ridge ===
83°13′S 167°35′E. A rugged, ice-covered ridge, 14 miles (23 km) long, extending eastward from the Holland Range, between Morton and Hewitt Glaciers, and terminating at Richards Inlet. Named by US-ACAN for Cdr. G.H. Lewis, USN, commanding officer of the USS Burton Island during USN OpDFrz, 1964.

== Western rim ==
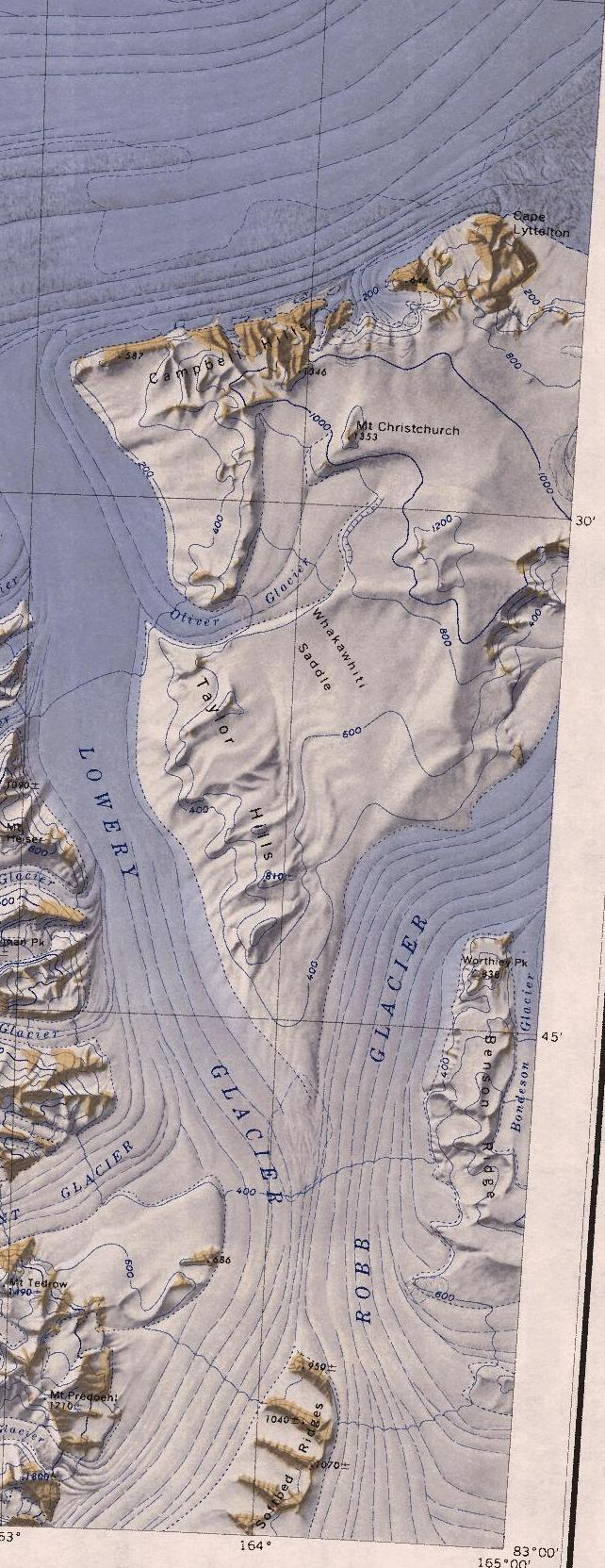
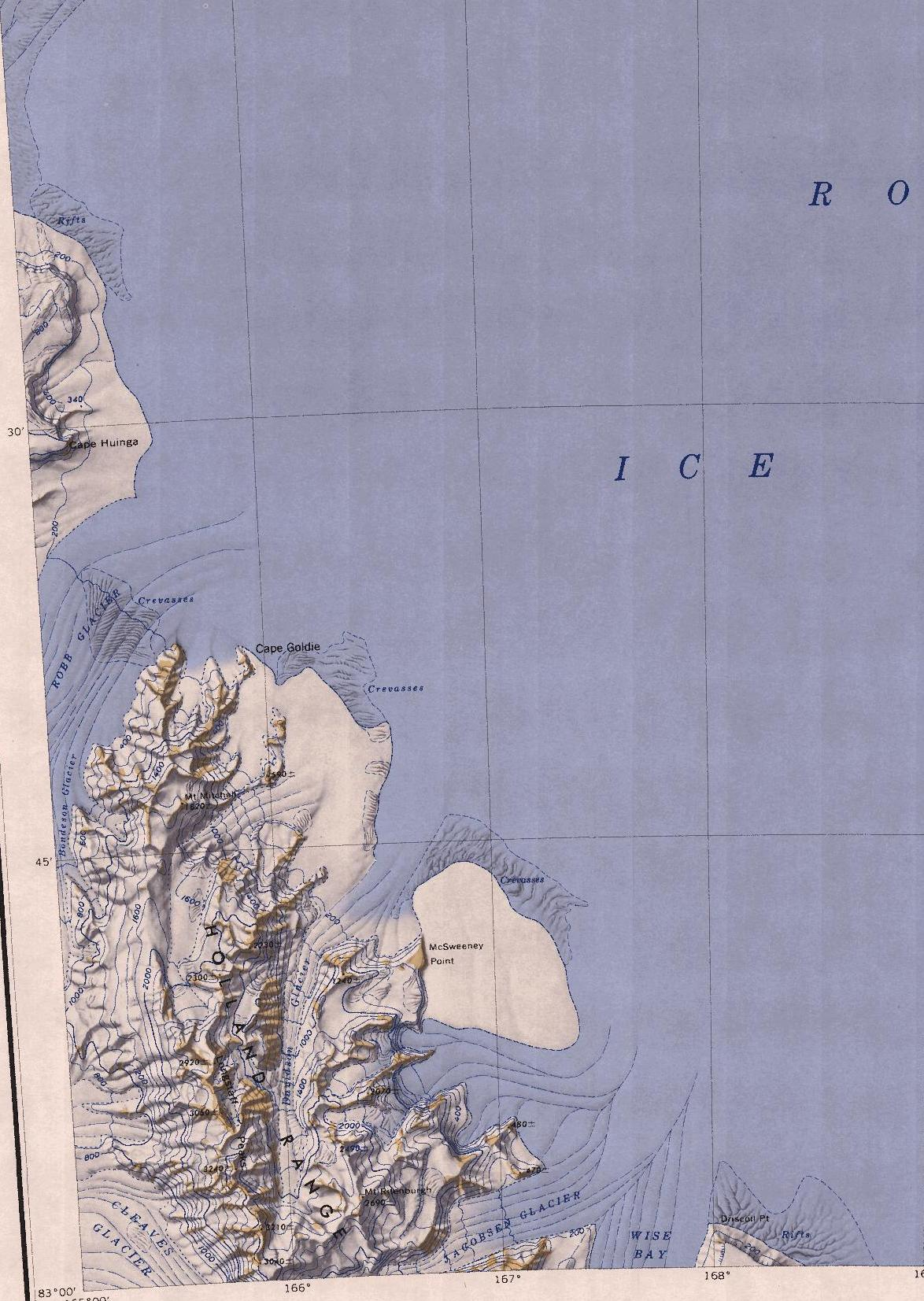

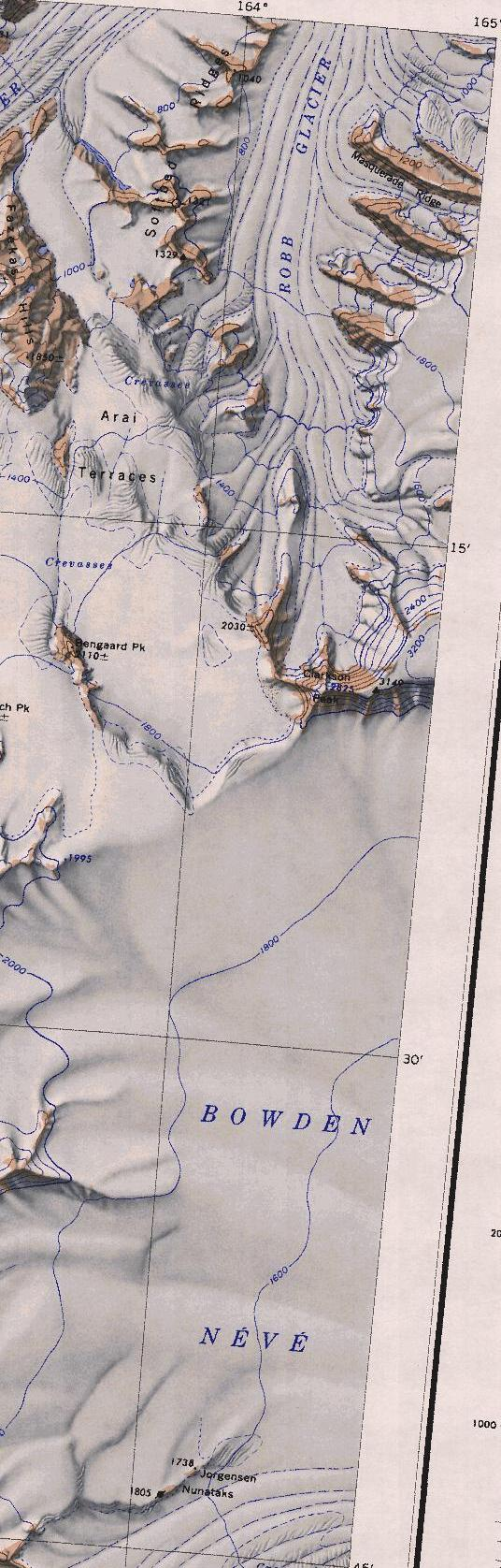
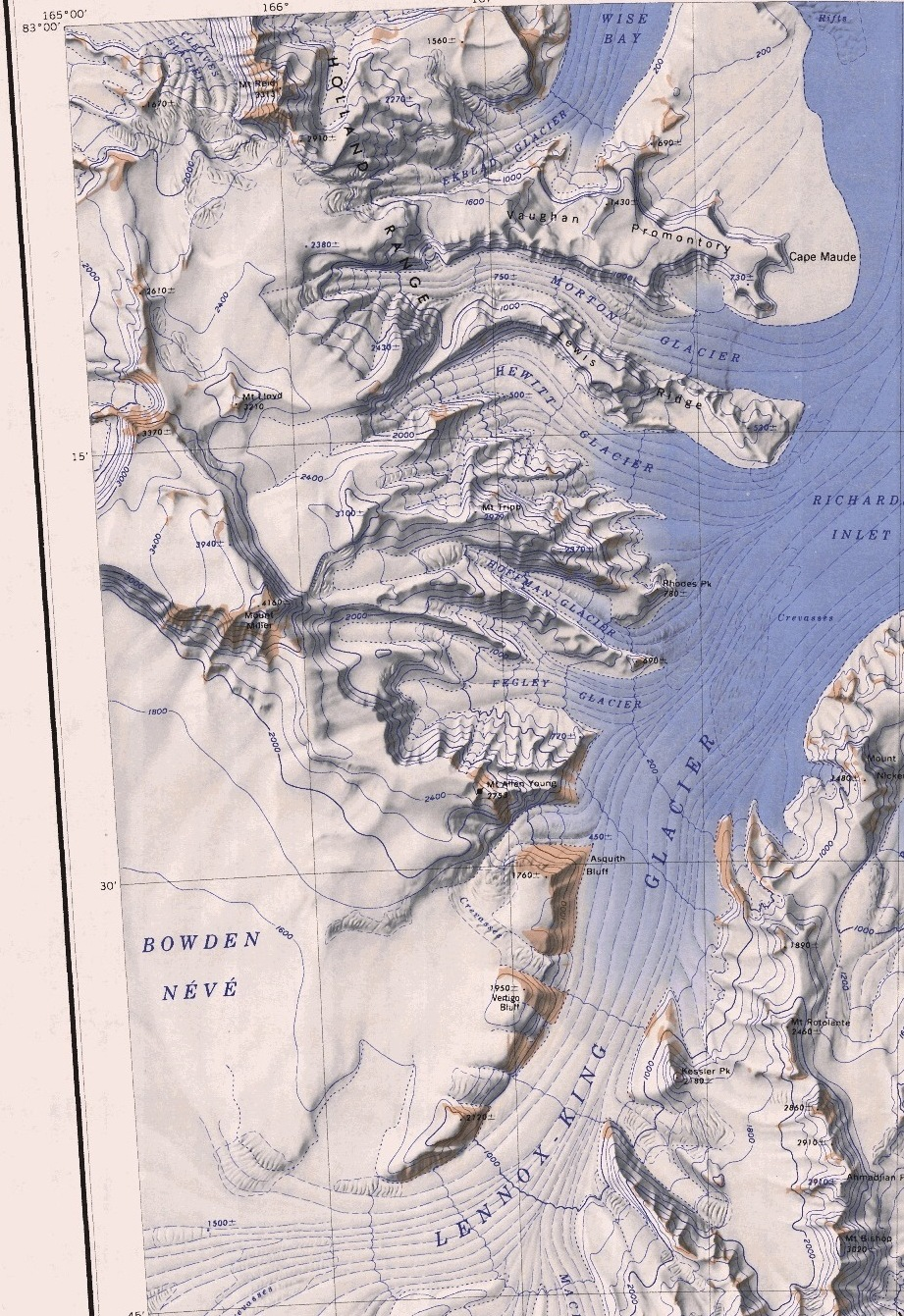
Holland Range

The western rim of the Holland Range is defined by Benson Ridge, Softbed Ridges, Masquerade Ridge and Clarkson Peak, which rises above the Bowden Névé.

=== Benson Ridge ===
82°46′S 164°48′E. Rugged ridge between Robb Glacier and Bondeson Glacier, standing 5 miles (8.0 km) west of the north end of the Holland Range. Mapped by the USGS from tellurometer surveys and Navy air photos, 1960-62. Named by the US-ACAN for Carl S. Benson, USARP glaciologist at Roosevelt Island, 1961-62.

=== Worthley Peak ===
82°43′S 164°46′E. A peak, 840 metres (2,760 ft), at the north end of Benson Ridge overlooking lower Robb Glacier. Mapped by the United States Geological Survey (USGS) from tellurometer surveys and Navy air photos, 1960–62. Named by Advisory Committee on Antarctic Names (US-ACAN) for Elmer G. Worthley, United States Antarctic Research Program (USARP) bryologist at McMurdo Sound, 1958–59.

=== Masquerade Ridge ===
83°04′S 164°40′E. Prominent rock ridge, 5 miles (8.0 km) long, located 16 miles (26 km) north of Clark Peak on the east side of Robb Glacier. Rocks were collected here by John Gunner and John Splettstoesser in December 1969. The name was suggested by Gunner because the ridge is pictured on the cover of the Feb. 7, 1970 issue of Saturday Review, in which an article about the 1969-70 Ohio State University Geological Expedition to the general area appears. The ridge on the photograph was evidently confused with Coalsack Bluff, and the individual in the foreground of the photograph is not David Elliot, as the caption states.

=== Clarkson Peak ===
83°19′S 164°34′E. A prominent conical peak, 2,825 metres (9,268 ft) high, at the head of Robb Glacier, on the spur running west from Mount Miller. Sighted in January 1958 by the N.Z. Southern Party of the CTAE (1956-58), and named for Mr. T.R. Clarkson, a member of the Ross Sea Committee.

== Northern section ==
The northern section of the Holland Range, to the north of the Jacobsen Glacier and Cleaves Glacier, contains Cape Goldie, Mount Mitchell, McSweeney Point, Longstaff Peaks, Mount Rifenburgh and Mount Reid.

=== Mount Mitchell ===
82°43′S 165°36′E. Mountain, 1,820 metres (5,970 ft) high, standing 5 miles (8.0 km) southwest of Cape Goldie in the north part of the Holland Range. Mapped by the USGS from tellurometer surveys (1961-62) and Navy air photos (1960). Named by US-ACAN for Cdr. G.W. Mitchell, Commanding Officer of the USS Burton Island during USN OpDFrz, 1964.

=== Longstaff Peaks ===
82°54′S 165°42′E. A series of high peaks standing just west of Davidson Glacier in the north-central part of the Holland Range. Discovered by the BrNAE (1901-04), and named "Mount Longstaff" for Llewellyn W. Longstaff, a principal contributor to the expedition. The descriptive term was amended by the NZ-APC. Not: Mount Longstaff.

=== Mount Rifenburgh ===
82°57′S 166°20′E. Mountain, 2,690 metres (8,830 ft) high, standing 2 miles (3.2 km) east of the head of Davidson Glacier in the Holland Range. Mapped by the USGS from tellurometer surveys (1961-62) and Navy air photos (1960). Named by US-ACAN for Capt. E. Rifenburgh, USN, Commanding Officer of the USS Arneb during USN OpDFrz 1963.

=== Mount Reid ===
83°03′S 166°01′E. A prominent, mainly ice-free mountain, 3,315 metres (10,876 ft) high, standing just east of the head of Cleaves Glacier in the Holland Range. Discovered by the BrAE (1907-09) and named for Alfred Reid, manager of the expedition.

== Southern section ==
The southern section of the Holland Range, to the south of the Jacobsen Glacier and Cleaves Glacier, contains the Vaughan Promontory, Cape Maude, Lewis Ridge, Mount Lloyd, Mount Tripp, Rhodes Peak, Mount Miller and Mount Allen Young.

=== Mount Lloyd ===
83°13′S 165°44′E. A mountain, 3,210 metres (10,530 ft) high, in the Holland Range, standing north of the head of Hewitt Glacier, 7 miles (11 km) north of Mount Miller. Discovered and named by the BrAE (1907-09).

=== Bordogna Plateau ===
83°18′00″S 165°19′00″E A high triangular plateau in the south Holland Range, approximately 45 square miles (120 km^{2}) in extent and varying from 3,000 to 4,000 metres (9,800 to 13,100 ft) in elevation. The plateau is bordered by steep cliffs, and by Mount Lloyd on the north and Clarkson Peak and Mount Miller on the south. The abrupt southern cliffs rise 1,200 metres (3,900 ft) above the Bowden Névé. Named by the Advisory Committee on Antarctic Names in 2005 after Joseph Bordogna who served the National Science Foundation as Assistant Director for Engineering (1992–96), Assistant Deputy Director (1996–99), and Deputy Director (1999-2005). Throughout the period he provided key leadership and guidance to the United States Antarctic Program at a number of critical points in its evolution.

=== Mount Tripp ===
83°17′S 166°53′E. A massive, cone-shaped, ice-covered mountain, 2,980 metres (9,780 ft) high, standing between Hoffman and Hewitt Glaciers, 7 miles (11 km) west-north-west of Rhodes Peak in the Holland Range. Discovered by the BrAE (1907-09) and named for Leonard O.H. Tripp, of New Zealand, who gave assistance to this expedition and also to Shackleton's expedition of 1914-17.

=== Rhodes Peak ===
83°20′S 167°47′E. A peak, 780 metres (2,560 ft) high, standing at the north side of the mouth of Hoffman Glacier, marking the seaward end of the ridge descending east from Mount Tripp, Holland Range. Named by US-ACAN for Lt. Cdr. A.G. Rhodes, RNZN, commanding officer of HMNZS Pukaki, ocean station ship on duty between New Zealand and McMurdo Sound in 1964 and 1965.

=== Mount Miller ===
83°20′S 165°48′E. A prominent mountain, 4,160 metres (13,650 ft) high, standing in the Holland Range, 7 miles (11 km) south of Mount Lloyd. Discovered and named by the BrAE, 1907-09.

=== Mount Allen Young ===
83°27′S 166°52′E. A prominent pyramidal mountain, 2,755 metres (9,039 ft), standing just south of Fegley Glacier and west of Lennox-King Glacier. Discovered by the BrAE (1907-09) and named for Sir Allen Young, polar explorer who led the successful search for Benjamin Leigh Smith in the Arctic in 1882.

== Sources ==
- Alberts, Fred G., ed. (1995), Geographic Names of the Antarctic (PDF) (2 ed.), United States Board on Geographic Names This article incorporates public domain material from websites or documents of the United States Board on Geographic Names.
- "Bordogna Plateau", Geographic Names Information System, United States Geological Survey, United States Department of the Interior
- Holland Range, USGS
- Mount Elizabeth, USGS
- Mount Rabot, USGS
- Nimrod Glacier, USGS
