= Taylor Hill =

Taylor Hill may refer to:

== Places ==
- Taurere / Taylor Hill, Auckland; a volcanic hill
- Taylor Hill, Huddersfield, West Yorkshire, England, UK; a suburb of the English town of Huddersfield
- Taylor Hill (Delaware County, New York), USA; a mountain

== People ==
- Taylor Hill (baseball) (born 1989), American baseball player
- Taylor Hill (model) (born 1996), American model
- Taylor Hill (sprinter) (born 1996), sprinter from the British Virgin Islands

== See also ==
- Taylor Hills, Carter County, Montana, USA; a set of hills
- Taylor (disambiguation)
