= Svaton Peaks =

Mountain range in Ross Dependency, Antarctica

- Location within Antarctica

Highest point
- Coordinates: 82°35′S 161°00′E

Geography
- Continent: Antarctica
- Parent range: Queen Elizabeth Range

Svaton Peaks (82°35′S 161°00′E) is a cluster of rugged peaks at the north end of the Queen Elizabeth Range, Antarctica, surmounting the area between the mouths of the Heilman Glacier and Otago Glacier.

== Exploration and name ==
The Svaton Peaks were mapped by the United States Geological Survey (USGS) from tellurometer surveys and Navy air photos, 1960–62. They were named by the United States Advisory Committee on Antarctic Names (US-ACAN) for Ernest M. Svaton, United States Antarctic Research Program (USARP) ionospheric physicist at McMurdo Station, winter 1963 and 1964.

== Location ==
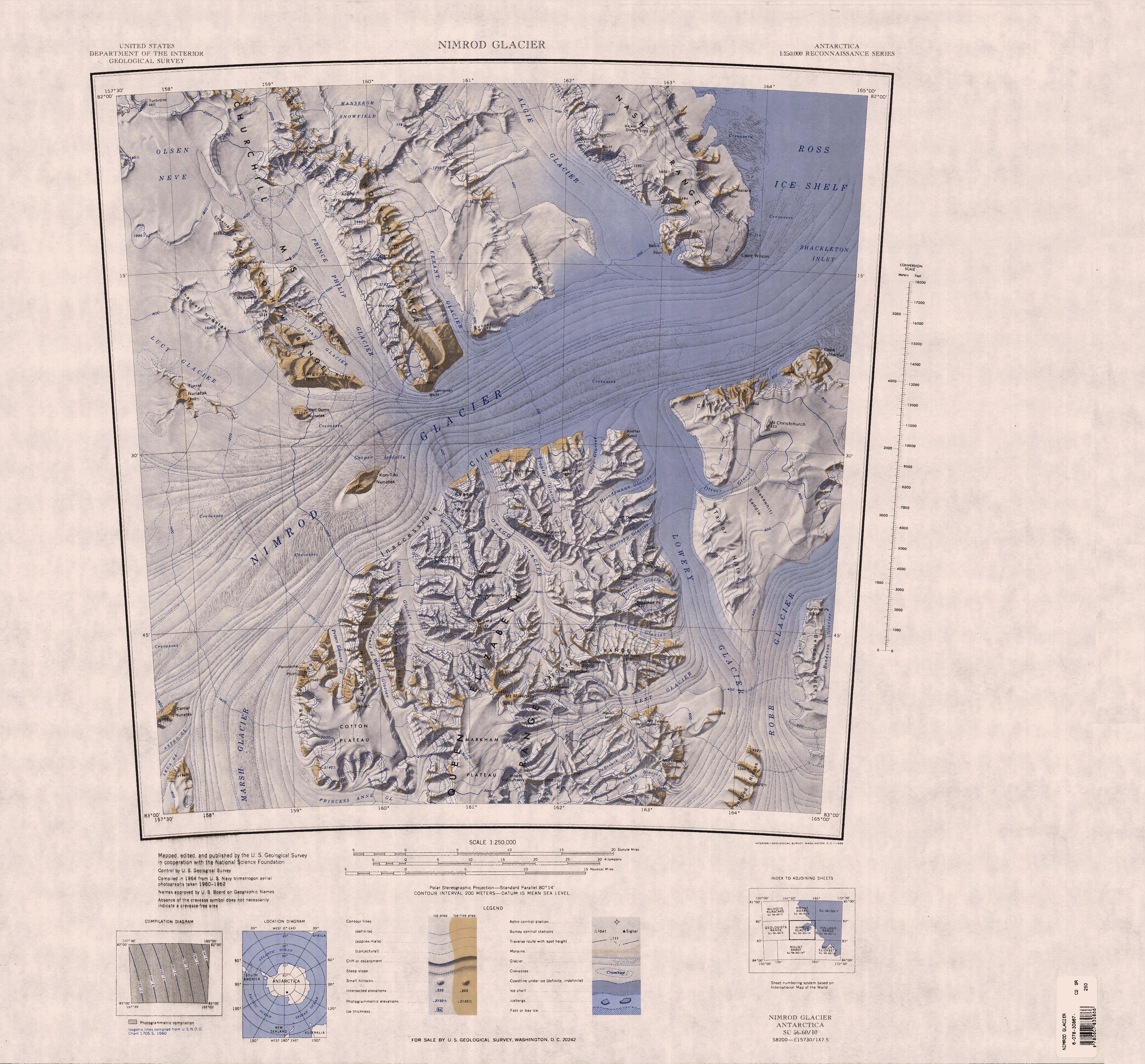
Cotton Plateau in southwest of map

Svaton Peaks are in the north of the Queen Elizabeth Range at the north end of a block bounded by the Inaccessible Cliffs along the coast of the Nimrod Glacier to the north, the Hamilton Glacier to the west and the Otago Glacier to the east. Nearby features include the Heilman Glacier, Mount Hofmann, Mount Sandved, Mount Dougherty and Mount Cara.

== Features ==
=== Inaccessible Cliffs ===
82°33′S 160°48′E. A line of steep cliffs, interrupted by several glaciers, which form the northern escarpment of the Queen Elizabeth Range. The escarpment borders the southern side of the Nimrod Glacier which is very heavily crevassed. Named by the northern party of the NZGSAE (1961-62) because of their general inaccessibility.

=== Mount Hofmann ===
82°40′S 160°36′E. Snow-covered mountain, 2,000 metres (6,600 ft) high, between the mouths of Hamilton Glacier and Heilman Glacier. Mapped by the USGS from tellurometer surveys and Navy air photos, 1960-62. Named by US-ACAN for Walther F. Hofmann, USARP glaciologist on the Ross Ice Shelf, 1962-63.

=== Mount Sandved ===
82°41′S 161°06′E. Mountain, 2,440 metres (8,010 ft) high, standing 2 nautical miles (3.7 km; 2.3 mi) north of Mount Dougherty in the north part of the Queen Elizabeth Range. Mapped by the USGS from tellurometer surveys and Navy air photos, 1960-62. Named by US-ACAN for Kurt G. Sandved, Information Officer at the Office of Antarctic Programs, National Science Foundation.

=== Mount Dougherty ===
82°43′S 161°05′E. A mountain, 2,790 metres (9,150 ft) high, between Mount Sandved and Mount Cara on the main north–south ridge in the north part of the Queen Elizabeth Range. Mapped by the USGS from tellurometer surveys and Navy air photos, 1960-62. Named by US-ACAN for Ellsworth C. Dougherty, USARP biologist at McMurdo Sound, 1959-60 and 1961-62.

=== Mount Cara ===
82°45′S 161°06′E. Peak, 3,145 metres (10,318 ft) high, standing 4 nautical miles (7.4 km; 4.6 mi) north-northwest of Mount Lysaght. Named by the British Antarctic Expedition, 1907–09.

== Sources ==
- Alberts, Fred G., ed. (1995), Geographic Names of the Antarctic (PDF) (2 ed.), United States Board on Geographic Names This article incorporates public domain material from websites or documents of the United States Board on Geographic Names.
- Nimrod Glacier, USGS: United States Geological Survey
- This article incorporates public domain material from websites or documents of the United States Geological Survey.
