= Prince of Wales Glacier =

Glacier in Antarctica

Prince of Wales Glacier (82°44′S 160°10′E) is a glacier in the Queen Elizabeth Range, flowing generally north for about 10 nautical miles (18 km) between Hochstein and Kohmyr Ridges into Hamilton Glacier. Named by the northern party of the New Zealand Geological Survey Antarctic Expedition (NZGSAE) (1961–62) for Charles, Prince of Wales, eldest son of Elizabeth II of the United Kingdom.
