= Frigate Range =

Mountain range in Antarctica

- Location within Antarctica

Geography
- Continent: Antarctica
- Range coordinates: 82°48′S 162°20′E
- Parent range: Queen Elizabeth Range

The Frigate Range (82°48′S 162°20′E) is a high mountain range extending 12 nautical miles (22 km) east from Mount Markham in the Queen Elizabeth Range of Antarctica.

== Name ==
The Frigate Range was named by the northern party of the New Zealand Geological Survey Antarctic Expedition (NZGSAE; 1961–62) to commemorate the work of the New Zealand frigates on Antarctic patrol duties.

== Location ==
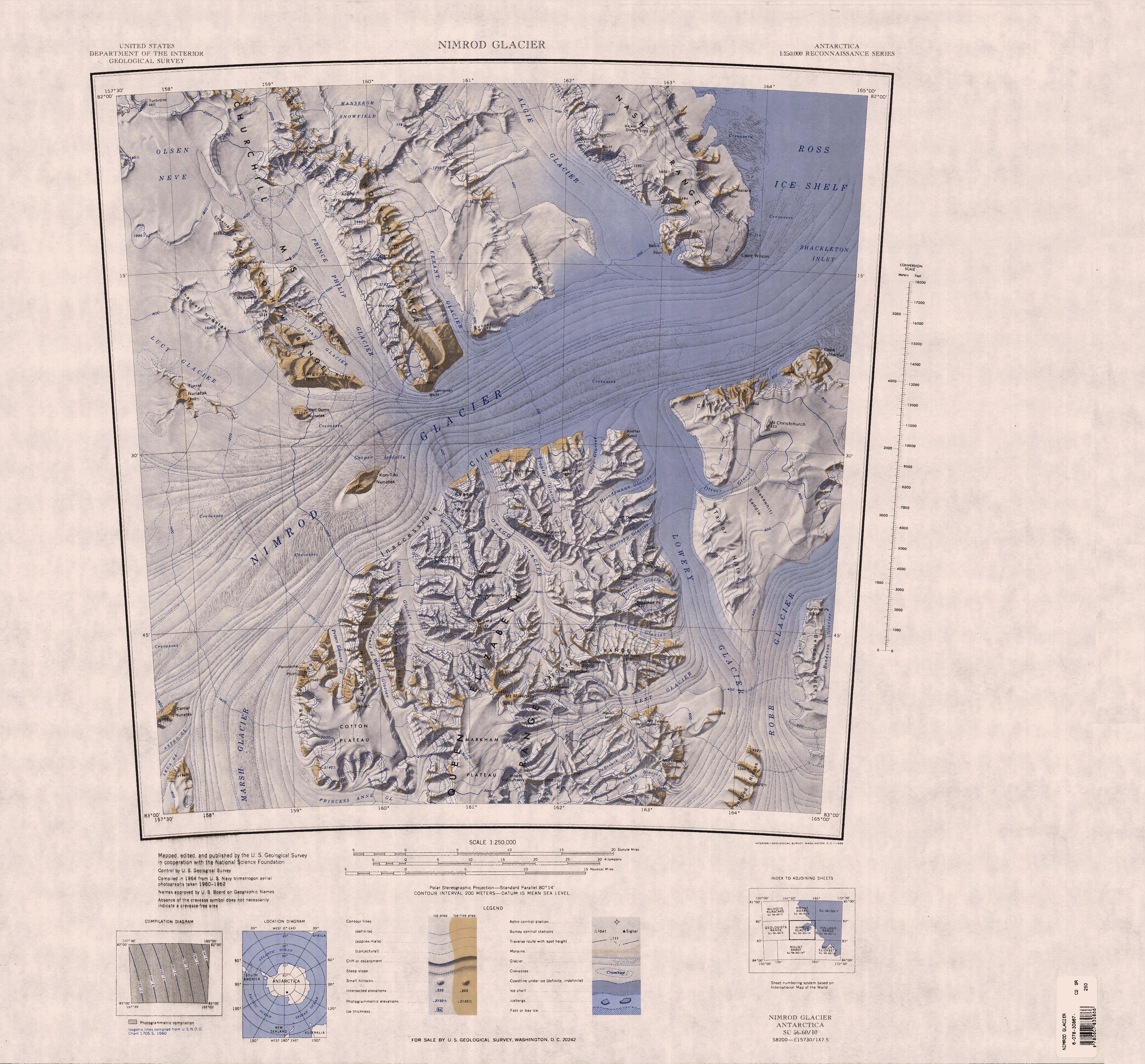
Cotton Plateau in southwest of map

The Frigate Range is a ridge in the east of the Queen Elizabeth Range, bounded by the Lowery Glacier to the east, the Kent Glacier to the south and the Rowland Glacier to the north. Mount Markham is to the west of the range. The Otago Glacier forms to the northwest of the Frigate Range and flows north. Features of the range, from west to east, include Mount Hawea, Mount Pukaki, Mount Rotoiti and Mount Wyss.

== Features ==
=== Mount Hawea ===
82°50′S 161°52′E. A peak, 3,080 metres (10,100 ft) high, standing 4 nautical miles (7.4 km; 4.6 mi) east of Mount Markham. Named by the northern party of the NZGSAE (1961–62) for the New Zealand frigate, Hawea.

=== Mount Pukaki ===
82°49′S 162°06′E. A peak between Mount Hawea and Mount Rotoiti. Named by the northern party of the NZGSAE (1961–62) for the New Zealand frigate Pukaki.

=== Mount Rotoiti ===
82°48′S 162°14′E. A peak, 2,900 metres (9,500 ft) high, standing 1 nautical mile (1.9 km; 1.2 mi) northeast of Mount Pukaki. Named by the northern party of the NZGSAE (1961–62) for the New Zealand frigate, Rotoiti.

=== Mount Wyss ===
82°47′S 162°42′E. A peak, 1,930 metres (6,330 ft) high, standing 3 nautical miles (5.6 km; 3.5 mi) east of Mount Rotoiti. Mapped by the United States Geological Survey (USGS) from tellurometer surveys and Navy air photos, 1960–62. Named by the United States Advisory Committee on Antarctic Names (US-ACAN) for Orville Wyss, USARP biologist at McMurdo Station, 1962–63.

== Sources ==
- Alberts, Fred G., ed. (1995), Geographic Names of the Antarctic (PDF) (2 ed.), United States Board on Geographic Names This article incorporates public domain material from websites or documents of the United States Board on Geographic Names.
- Nimrod Glacier, USGS: United States Geological Survey
- This article incorporates public domain material from websites or documents of the United States Geological Survey.
