= Shackleton Coast =

Portion of the coast of Antarctica

Coordinates: 82°0′S 162°0′E

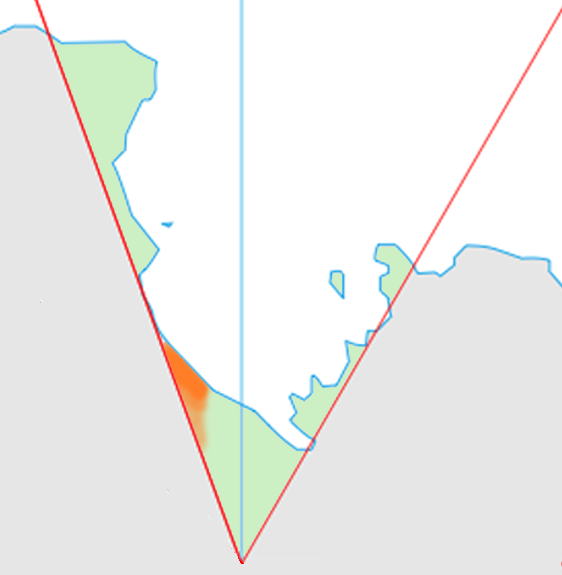
Location of Shackleton Coast (marked in orange) within the Ross Dependency

Shackleton Coast is the portion of the coast along the west side of the Ross Ice Shelf between Cape Selborne and Airdrop Peak at the east side of Beardmore Glacier in Antarctica.

It was named by the New Zealand Antarctic Place-Names Committee (NZ-APC) in 1961 after Sir Ernest Shackleton. He accompanied Scott on the southern journey during the Discovery expedition (1901–04) and subsequently led three Antarctic expeditions. On the British Antarctic Expedition (1907–09), Shackleton discovered the area beyond Shackleton Inlet to the Beardmore Glacier, and was the first to find a practicable route to the South Pole. Lack of food stopped him 97 miles (180 km) from his goal.
