= Bartlett Inlet =

- Location of Bartlett Inlet
- Location: Antarctica
- Coordinates: 77°13′S 156°40′W
- Type: Inlet
- Etymology: Lt. Eugene F. Bartlett
- Part of: Southern Ocean
- Ocean/sea sources: Antarctic Ocean
- Managing agency: New Zealand (Ross Dependency)
- Max. width: 52 feet (16 m)
- Surface elevation: 410 feet (120 m)
- Max. temperature: 23.8 °C (74.8 °F)
- Min. temperature: −16.9 °C (1.6 °F)
- Frozen: Year-round

Bartlett Inlet is a largely ice-filled inlet, about 16 nautical miles (30 km) wide, indenting the north coast of Edward VII Peninsula just east of Cape Colbeck. It was mapped from surveys by the United States Geological Survey and from U.S. Navy air photos (1959–65), and named by the Advisory Committee on Antarctic Names for Lieutenant Eugene F. Bartlett, MC, U.S. Navy, officer in charge at Byrd Station, 1960.
