= Mount Rabot =

Mountain in East Antarctica

- Location within Antarctica

Highest point
- Coordinates: 83°11′S 161°17′E

Geography
- Continent: Antarctica
- Parent range: Queen Elizabeth Range

Mount Rabot (83°11′S 161°17′E) is a mountain, 3,335 metres (10,942 ft) high, standing 3 nautical miles (5.6 km; 3.5 mi) southeast of Mount Lecointe in the Queen Elizabeth Range in Antarctica.

== Name ==
Mount Rabot was discovered and named by the British Antarctic Expedition (BrAE; 1907-09). Charles Rabot was editor of La Géographie, bulletin of the Société Geographique, Paris, and was an outstanding glaciologist of that period.

== Location ==
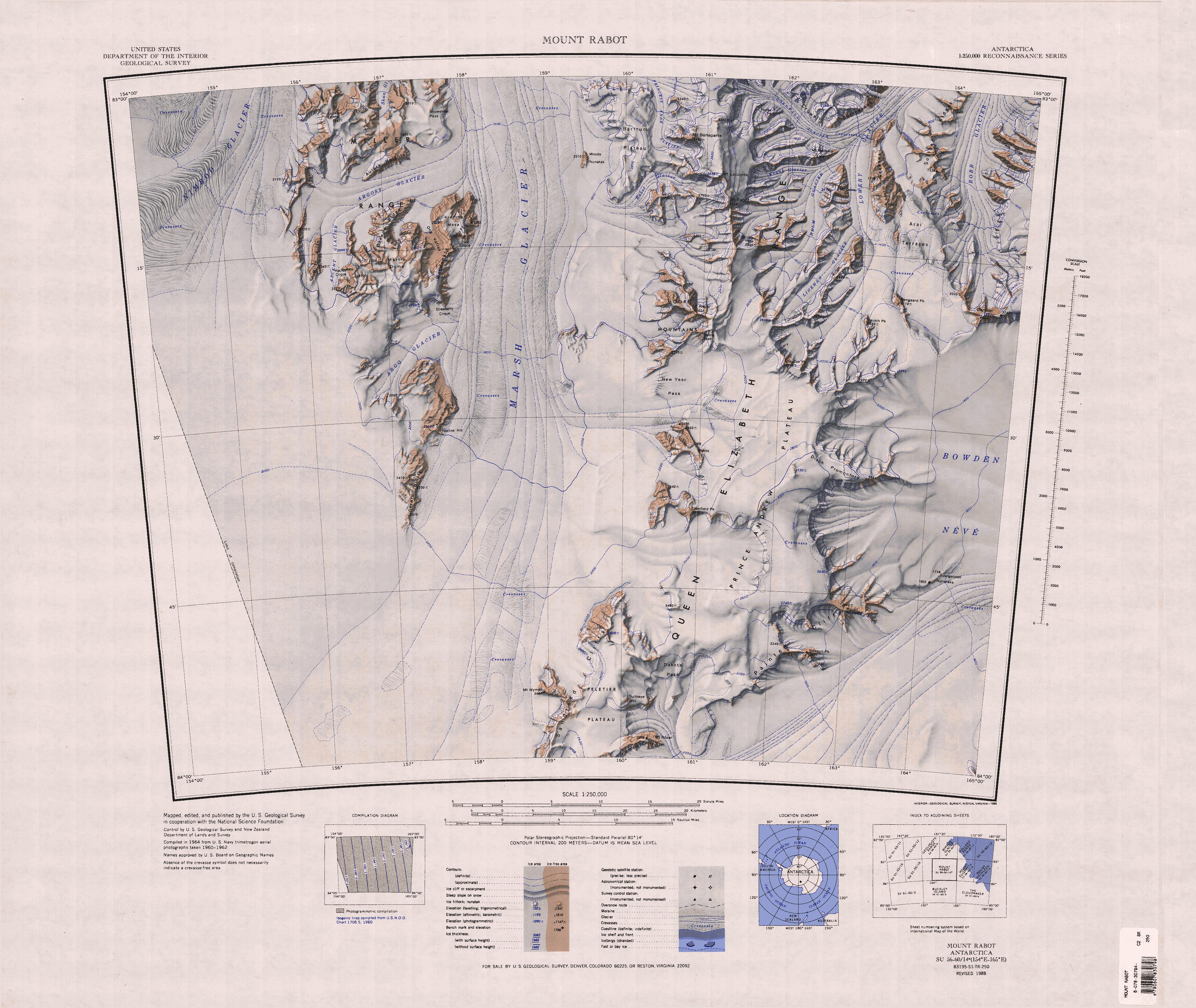
Peletier Plateau in southwest of map

Mount Rabot is in the center of the Queen Elizabeth Range, to the east of the Marsh Glacier and west of the Helm Glacier. The Moore Mountains and Prince Andrew Plateau are to the south. Markham Plateau is to the north. Features near Mount Rabot include Solitary Peak to the south, Mount Counts and Rabot Glacier to the west, Moody Nunatak, Bartrum Plateau and Mount Bonaparte to the northwest, Mount Lecointe to the north, Fopay Peak and Mount Macbain to the northeast.

== Features ==
=== Solitary Peak ===
83°14′S 161°40′E. A peak 2,810 metres (9,220 ft) high located 4.5 nautical miles (8.3 km; 5.2 mi) southeast of Mount Rabot. An important geologic section was measured on the feature by the Ohio State University Geological Party, 1967-68, which suggested the name because of the peak's relative isolation.

=== Mount Counts ===
83°11′S 160°26′E. A sharply pointed peak on the east side of Marsh Glacier marking the termination of the spur running west from Mount Rabot. Named by the New Zealand Geological Survey Antarctic Expedition (NZGSAE; 1961-62) for Lieutenant Commander William D. Counts, United States Navy, pilot on reconnaissance flights, killed in a Neptune plane crash at Wilkes Station in November 1961.

=== Moody Nunatak ===
83°07′S 159°30′E. A prominent isolated nunatak at the east side of Marsh Glacier, 4 nautical miles (7.4 km; 4.6 mi) west of Bartrum Plateau. Named by the NZGSAE (1964-65) for Lieutenant D.M. Moody, pilot with United States Navy Squadron VX-6, who flew the southern party of NZGSAE in and out of the field.

=== Bartrum Plateau ===
83°06′S 160°06′E. An ice-covered plateau, 11 nautical miles (20 km; 13 mi) long and 6 nautical miles (11 km; 6.9 mi) wide, standing west of Mount Bonaparte. Named by the Northern Party of the NZGSAE (1961-62) for geologist, Professor John Bartrum of Auckland University College.

=== Mount Bonaparte ===
83°05′S 160°50′E. A mountain, 3,430 metres (11,250 ft) high, standing 4 nautical miles (7.4 km; 4.6 mi) northwest of Mount Lecointe. Discovered by the BrAE (1907-09) under Ernest Shackleton, and named for Prince Roland Bonaparte, President of the Geographical Society of Paris.

=== Mount Lecointe ===
83°09′S 161°09′E. A conspicuous mountain, 3,620 metres (11,880 ft) high, located 3 nautical miles (5.6 km; 3.5 mi) northwest of Mount Rabot. Named by the BrAE (1907-09) for Lieutenant Georges Lecointe, who was second in command of the BelgAE (1897-99) under Gerlache.

=== Fopay Peak ===
83°03′S 161°47′E. A peak 5 nautical miles (9.3 km; 5.8 mi) northwest of Mount Macbain, on the south side of Cornwall Glacier. Named by the United States Advisory Committee on Antarctic Names (US-ACAN) for Charles F. Fopay, Weather Central Meteorologist at Little America V, 1958.

=== Crowell Buttresses ===
83°03′S 162°30′E. A series of high snow and rock buttresses, 10 nautical miles (19 km; 12 mi) long, forming the north wall of Cornwall Glacier for a distance of 5 nautical miles (9.3 km; 5.8 mi) and then trending northeast an equal distance along the west side of Lowery Glacier. Named by US-ACAN after John T. Crowell (d. 1986), who served with the National Science Foundation as Antarctic Vessel Project Officer, 1960-63, and Special Projects Officer, 1963-69. He led a reconnaissance party to the Antarctic Peninsula in January 1963 to investigate the location for a U.S. station in the peninsula area.

=== Mount Macbain ===
83°06′S 162°18′E. A prominent mountain, 2,205 metres (7,234 ft) high, standing between the mouths of Cornwall Glacier and Helm Glacier. Named by the US-ACAN for Commander Merle Macbain, United States Navy, Public Information Officer, United States Naval Support Force, Antarctica, during United States Navy OpDFrz III and IV, 1957-58 and 1958-59.

== Sources ==
- Alberts, Fred G., ed. (1995), Geographic Names of the Antarctic (PDF) (2 ed.), United States Board on Geographic Names This article incorporates public domain material from websites or documents of the United States Board on Geographic Names.
- Mount Rabot, USGS: United States Geological Survey
- This article incorporates public domain material from websites or documents of the United States Geological Survey.
