= Mount Markham =

Mountain in Ross Dependency, Antarctica

- Location within Antarctica

Highest point
- Elevation: 4,350 m (14,270 ft)
- Prominence: 2,134 m (7,001 ft)
- Listing: Ultra, Ribu
- Coordinates: 82°51′S 161°21′E

Geography
- Location: Shackleton Coast, Antarctica
- Parent range: Queen Elizabeth Range

Mount Markham (82°51′S 161°21′E) is a twin-peaked massif surmounting the north end of the Markham Plateau in the Queen Elizabeth Range of Antarctica. The peaks have elevations of 4,350 metres (14,270 ft) and 4,280 metres (14,040 ft).

== Exploration and name ==
Mount Markham was discovered by the British National Antarctic Expedition of 1901–1904). It is named for Sir Clements Markham, who, as President of the Royal Geographical Society, planned the expedition and chose Robert Falcon Scott as its leader.

== Location ==
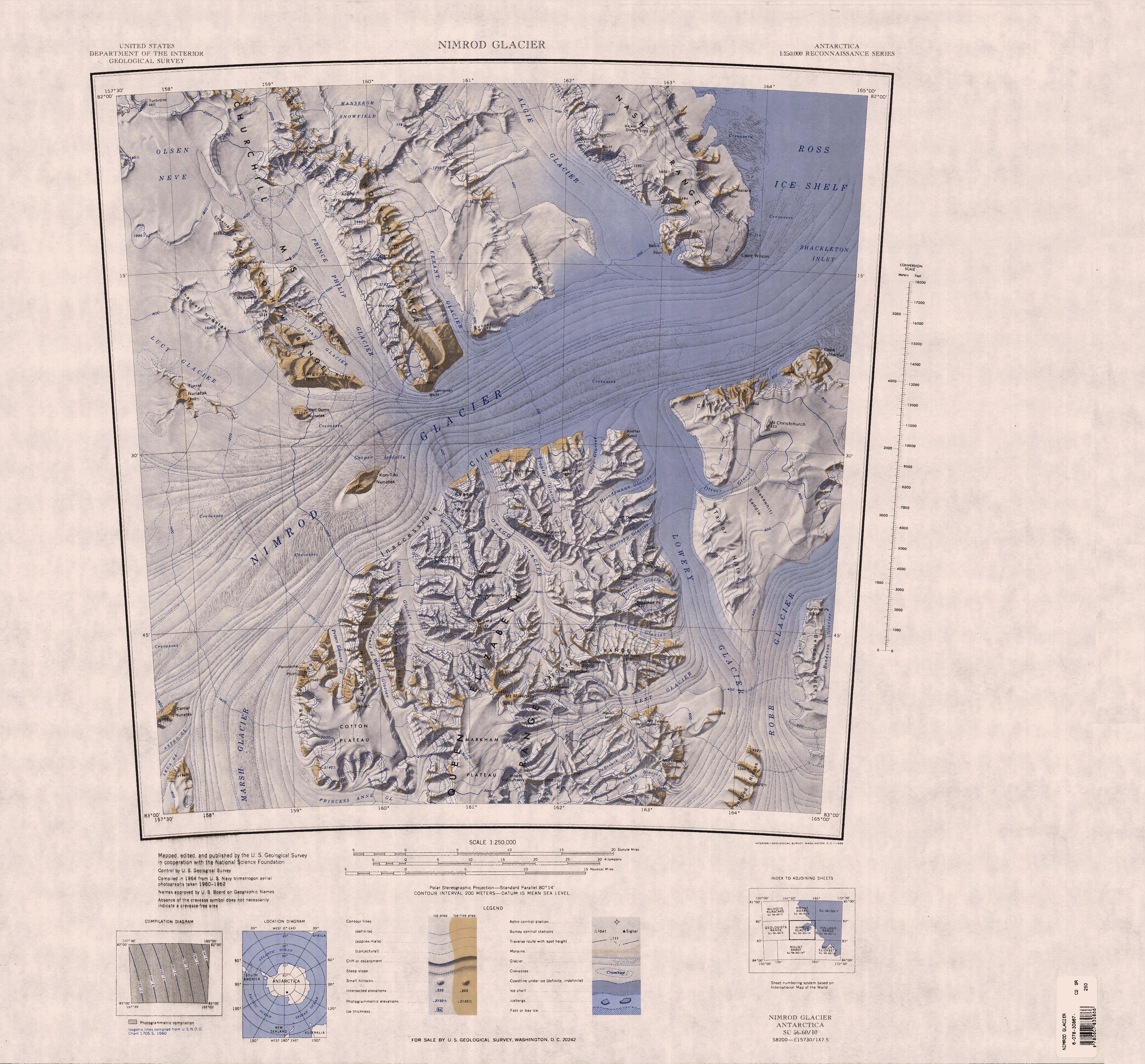
Cotton Plateau in southwest of map

Mount Markham is in the northern part of the Queen Elizabeth Range. It is south of Mount Cara, east of the Frigate Range and the head of the Kent Glacier, and northeast of the Markham Plateau. Nearby features include Mount Lysaght to the north, Mount Katsufrakis to the south and Haven Hill, Mount Tedrow and Mount Predoehl to the east.

== Nearby features ==
=== Markham Plateau ===
82°56′S 161°10′E. A small, but prominent, high plateau which extends south from Mount Markham for about 10 nautical miles (19 km; 12 mi) and forms the divide between east and west-flowing glaciers in the north part of the Queen Elizabeth Range. Mapped by the United States Geological Survey (USGS) from tellurometer surveys and Navy air photos, 1960-62. Named by the United States Advisory Committee on Antarctic Names (US-ACAN) in association with Mount Markham.

=== Mount Lysaght ===
82°49′S 161°19′E. A peak, 3,755 metres (12,320 ft) high, standing 1.5 nautical miles (2.8 km; 1.7 mi) north of Mount Markham. Discovered and named by the British Antarctic Expedition, 1907–09.

=== Mount Korsch ===
82°52′S 160°56′E. A pyramidal peak, rising to about 4,000 metres (13,000 ft) high on the northwest margin of the Markham Plateau, 3 nautical miles (5.6 km; 3.5 mi) west of Mount Markham. Named by US-ACAN in 1988 after geologist Russell J. Korsch who, with E. Stump and D. Egerton, climbed and geologically mapped this peak on December 3, 1985, as a member of a USARP field party. Korsch was a member of United States Antarctic Research Program (USARP) field parties, 1968-69 and 1985-86; NZARP field parties, 1982-83 and 1984-85.

=== Mount Katsufrakis ===
82°58′S 161°38′E. A projecting-type mountain on the east side of Markham Plateau. Mapped by the USGS from tellurometer surveys and Navy air photos, 1960-62. Named by the US-ACAN for John P. Katsufrakis, USARP radio scientist at McMurdo Station, 1963-64, and Byrd Station, 1964-65 and 1965-66.

=== Haven Hill ===
82°53′S 162°36′E. A hill 2 nautical miles (3.7 km; 2.3 mi) west of Mount Tedrow, on the south side of Kent Glacier. Mapped by the USGS from tellurometer surveys and Navy air photos, 1960-62. Named by US-ACAN for Stoner B. Haven, USARP biologist at McMurdo Sound, 1960.

=== Mount Tedrow ===
82°53′S 163°00′E. A mountain, 1,490 metres (4,890 ft) high, standing at the east side of the mouth of DeBreuck Glacier at its juncture with Kent Glacier. Mapped by the USGS from tellurometer surveys and Navy air photos, 1960-62. Named by the US-ACAN for Jack V. Tedrow, USARP glaciologist at McMurdo Station, 1959-60, 1960-61.

=== Mount Predoehl ===
82°56′S 163°11′E. A partly snow-covered mountain, 1,710 metres (5,610 ft) high, just north of lower Pavlak Glacier. Mapped by the USGS from tellurometer surveys and Navy air photos, 1960-62. Named by the US-ACAN for Martin C. Predoehl, USARP meteorologist at McMurdo Station, 1961-62 and 1962-63.

== See also ==
- List of ultras of Antarctica

== Sources ==
- Alberts, Fred G., ed. (1995), Geographic Names of the Antarctic (PDF) (2 ed.), United States Board on Geographic Names This article incorporates public domain material from websites or documents of the United States Board on Geographic Names.
- "Antarctica Ultra-Prominences". peaklist.org.
- Nimrod Glacier, USGS: United States Geological Survey
- This article incorporates public domain material from websites or documents of the United States Geological Survey.
