= Cotton Plateau =

Plateau in Antarctica

- Location within Antarctica

Highest point
- Coordinates: 82°54′S 159°40′E

Geography
- Continent: Antarctica
- Parent range: Queen Elizabeth Range

Cotton Plateau (82°54′S 159°40′E) is a snow-covered plateau just east of the mouth of Marsh Glacier, in the Queen Elizabeth Range.

== Name ==
Cotton Plateau was named by the northern party of the New Zealand Geological Survey Antarctic Expedition (NZGSAE; 1961–62) for Sir Charles Cotton, noted New Zealand geomorphologist and authority on glacial landforms.

== Location ==
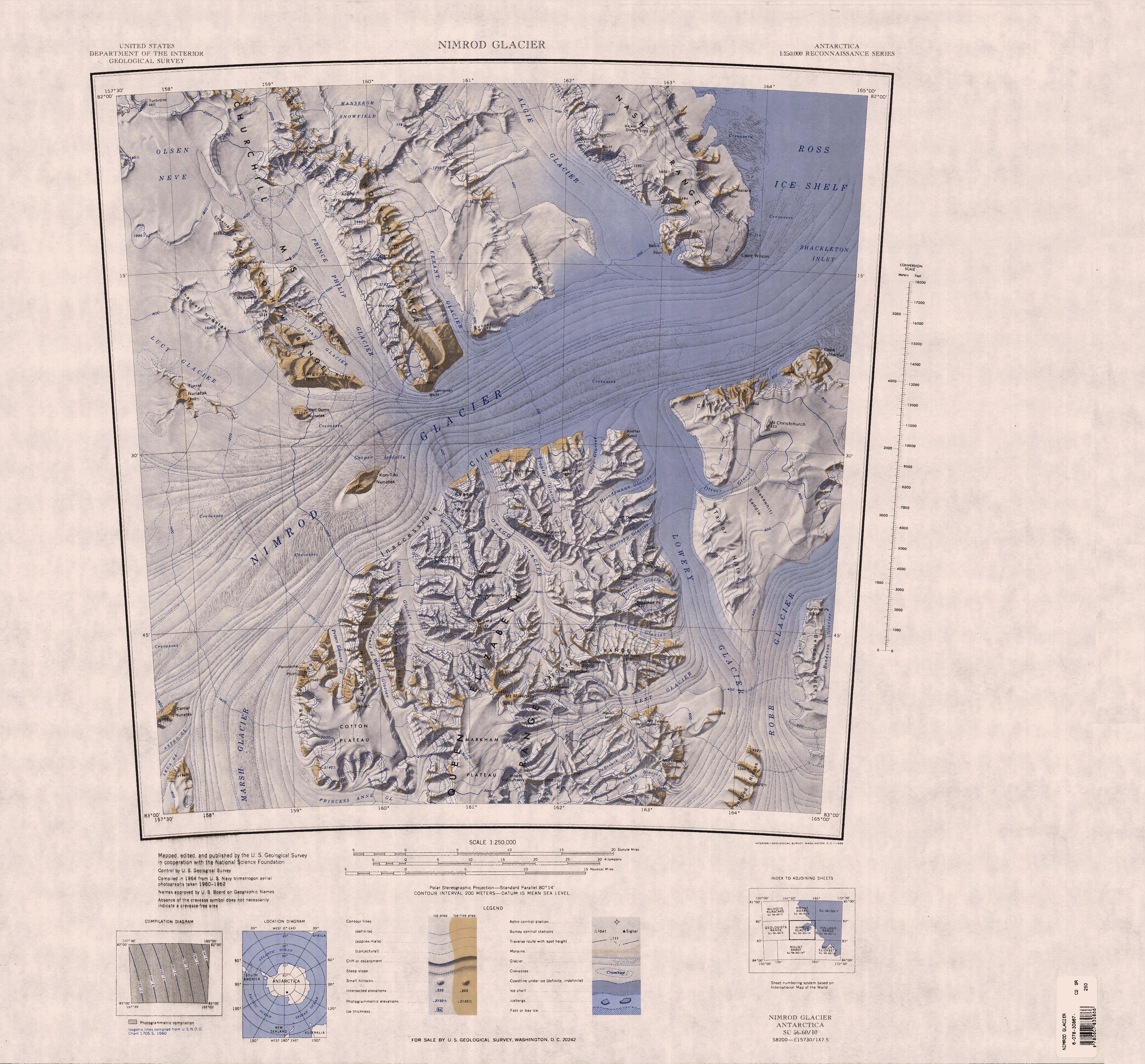
Cotton Plateau in southwest of map

Cotton Plateau is in the west of the Queen Elizabeth Range, bounded by the Marsh Glacier to the west, the Prince of Wales Glacier and Hamilton Glacier to the east and the Princess Anne Glacier to the south. Features include, from north to south, Hochstein Ridge, Prince Edward Glacier, Panorama Point and The Palisades.

== Features ==
=== Hochstein Ridge ===
82°45′S 159°47′E. A ridge 12 nautical miles (22 km; 14 mi) long, extending north from Cotton Plateau between Prince Edward Glacier and Prince of Wales Glacie. Mapped by the United States Geological Survey (USGS) from tellurometer surveys and Navy air photos, 1960-62. Named by the United States Advisory Committee on Antarctic Names (US-ACAN) for Manfred Hochstein, USARP glaciologist at Roosevelt Island, 1961-62, 1962-63 and 1963-64.

=== Komhyr Ridge ===
82°47′S 160°10′E. A prominent ridge immediately east of Hochstein Ridge. Mapped by the USGS from tellurometer surveys and Navy air photos, 1960-62. Named by US-ACAN for Walter D. Komhyr, USARP meteorologist at McMurdo Station, 1963-64.

=== Mount Gregory ===
82°52′S 159°44′E. A mountain 2,940 metres (9,650 ft) high at the south end of Hochstein Ridge. It is the only large elevation rising from Cotton Plateau. The name was suggested by the Holyoake, Cobham and Queen Elizabeth Ranges Part of the NZGSAE, 1964-65. Named for a geologist in the party, M. Gregory.

=== Panorama Point ===
82°49′S 159°10′E. Point surmounted by a small hill on the northwest side of Cotton Plateau, overlooking the junction of Marsh and Nimrod Glaciers. So named by the Holyoake, Cobham and Queen Elizabeth Ranges party of the NZGSAE (1964-65) because it affords an excellent view.

=== The Palisades ===
82°50′S 159°10′E. A steep escarpment at the west side of Cotton Plateau in the Queen Elizabeth Range, overlooking Marsh and Nimrod Glaciers. Seen by the northern party of the NZGSAE (1961-62) and so named because of the resemblance to a protective wall at the junction of two rivers.

== Sources ==
- Alberts, Fred G., ed. (1995), Geographic Names of the Antarctic (PDF) (2 ed.), United States Board on Geographic Names This article incorporates public domain material from websites or documents of the United States Board on Geographic Names.
- Nimrod Glacier, USGS: United States Geological Survey
- This article incorporates public domain material from websites or documents of the United States Geological Survey.
