= Shackleton Inlet =

Coordinates: 82°19′S 164°00′E

The Shackleton Inlet is a reentrant, about 16 km (10 mi) wide, between Cape Wilson and Cape Lyttelton. It is occupied by the terminus of the Nimrod Glacier descending at a low gradient from the bordering highlands to the Ross Ice Shelf.

Discovered by Capt. Robert Falcon Scott, in December 1902, while on his attempted trip to the South Pole. He was accompanied on this trip by Dr. Edward A. Wilson and Lt. (later Sir) Ernest Shackleton, for whom this inlet was named.
