= Marsh Glacier =

Glacier in Antarctica

- Location within Antarctica
- Coordinates: 82°52′S 158°30′E
- Length: 110 kilometres (68 mi)
- Terminus: Nimrod Glacier

The Marsh Glacier (82°52′S 158°30′E) is a glacier about 110 km (70 mi) long that is a tributary of the Nimrod Glacier, which enters the west of the Ross Ice Shelf, Antarctica.

== Location ==
The Marsh Glacier flows north from the Antarctic polar plateau between the Miller Range to the west and Queen Elizabeth Range to the east into the Nimrod Glacier. It was seen by a New Zealand party of the CTAE (1956–58) and named for G.W. Marsh, a member of the party.

== Left tributaries ==
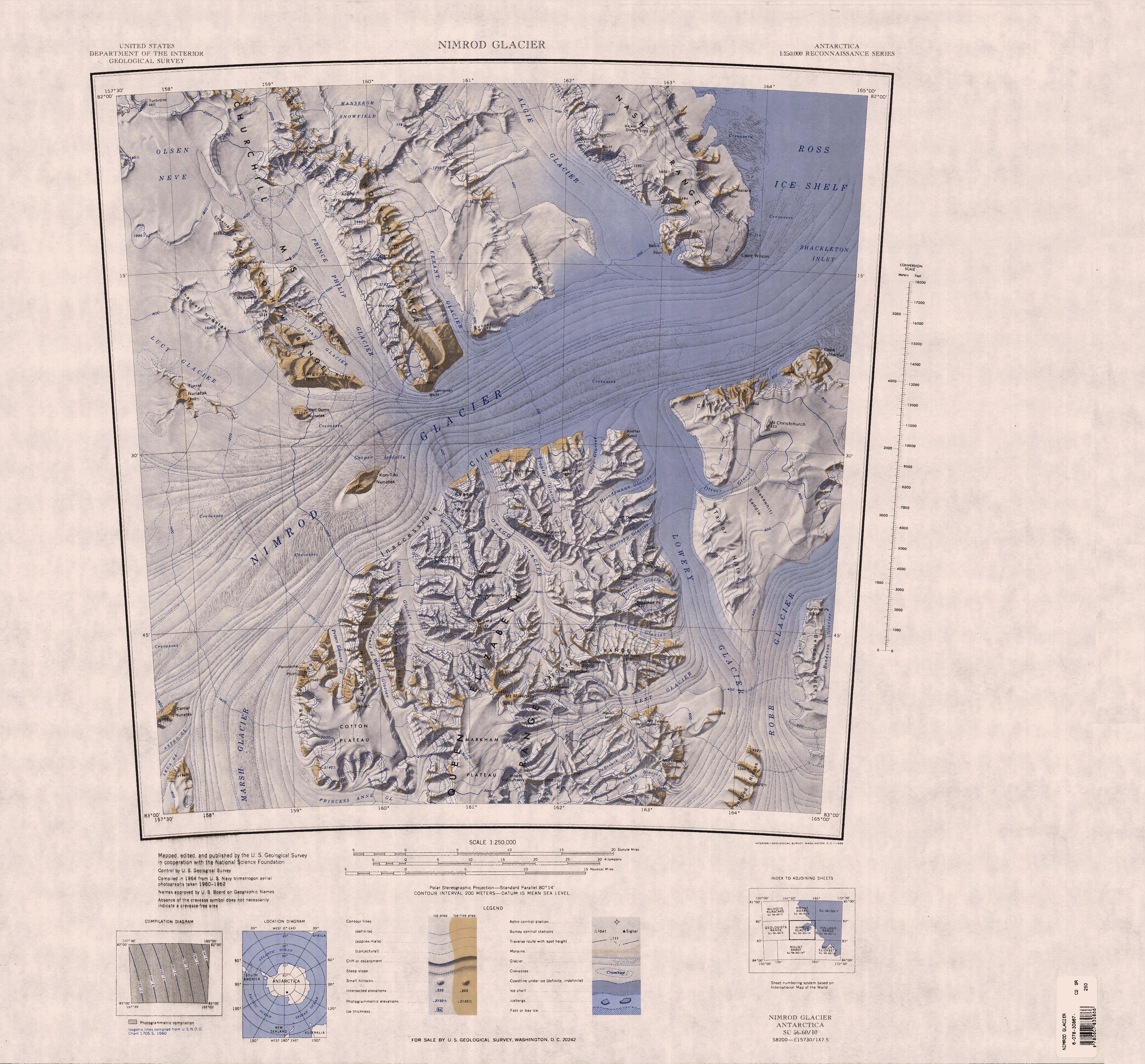
Nimrod Glacier and lower Marsh Glacier

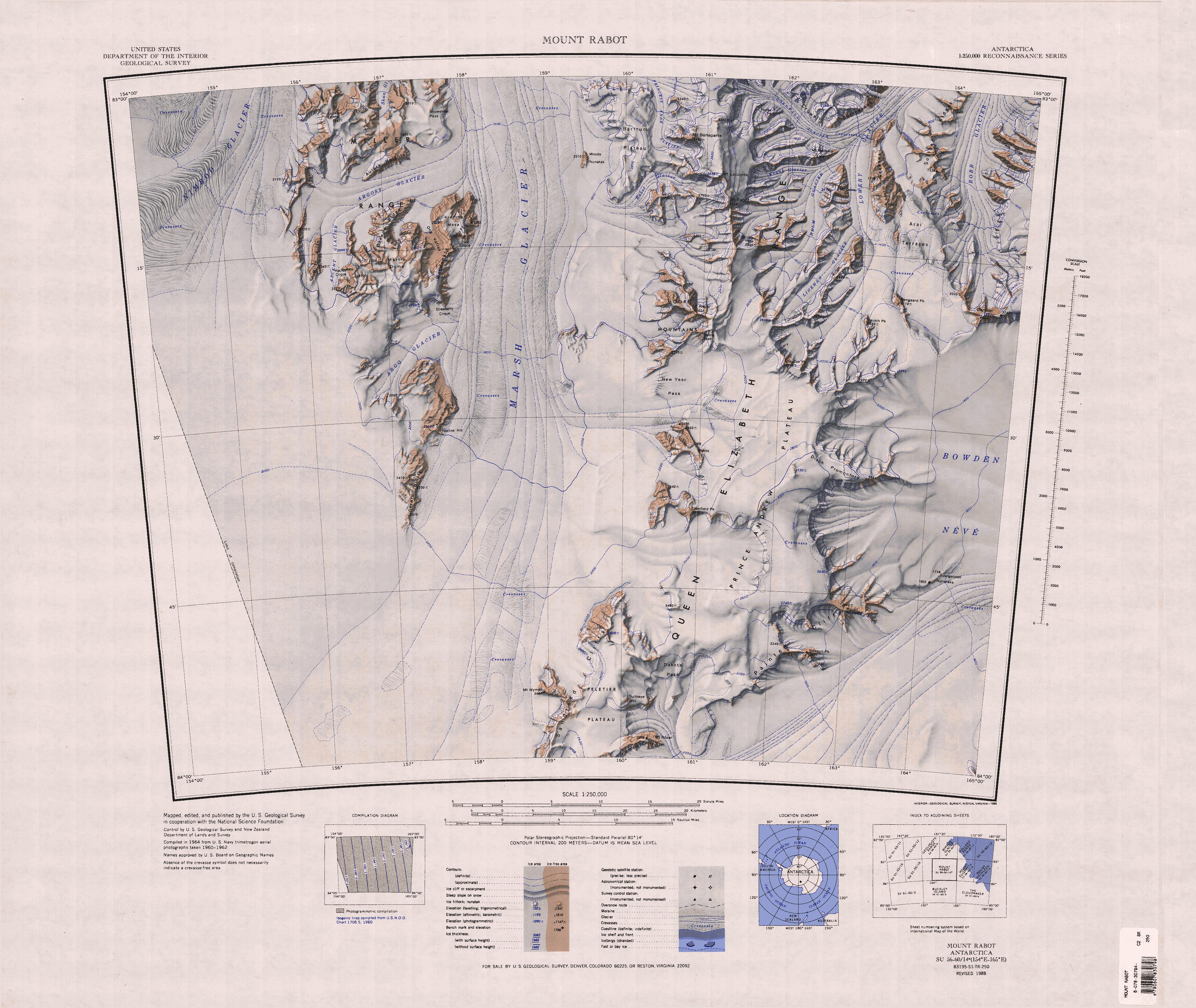
Miller Range and upper Marsh Glacier

Tributary glaciers entering from the left (Miller Range) are:

=== Argo Glacier ===
83°22′S 157°30′E- A glacier in the Miller Range, 10 miles (16 km) long, flowing northeast to enter Marsh Glacier just south of Macdonald Bluffs. Named by NZGSAE (1961–62) after the vessel sailed by Jason in Greek mythology.

=== Argosy Glacier ===
83°08′S 157°35′E. Glacier about 15 miles (24 km) long, flowing east through the Miller Range to enter Marsh Glacier north of Kreiling Mesa. Named by the NZGSAE (1961–62).

=== Ascent Glacier ===
83°13′S 156°24′E. Glacier, 2 miles (3.2 km) wide, flowing north to enter Argosy Glacier in the Miller Range just east of Milan Ridge. Named by the NZGSAE (1961–62) who used this glacier to gain access to the central Miller Range.

=== Astro Glacier ===
82°54′S 157°20′E. Glacier between Turner Hills and Tricom Peak in the Miller Range, flowing northeast into the Marsh Glacier. Seen by the northern party of the NZGSAE (1961–62) and so named because an astro station was set up on the bluff at the mouth of the glacier in December 1961.

=== Skua Glacier ===
82°55′S 157°40′E. A small southern tributary of Astro Glacier in the Miller Range. Mapped by the northern party of the NZGSAE (1961–62) and so named because of the skuas seen at its lower part in December 1961.

== Right tributaries ==
Tributary glaciers entering from the right (Queen Elizabeth Range) are:

=== Princess Anne Glacier ===
82°59′S 159°20′E. Glacier in the Queen Elizabeth Range, flowing from the area south of Mount Bonaparte between Cotton and Bartrum Plateaus into Marsh Glacier. Named by the northern party of the NZGSAE (1961–62) for Princess Anne, daughter of Queen Elizabeth II.

=== Rabot Glacier ===
83°11′S 160°10′E. A glacier in the Queen Elizabeth Range, flowing west from Mount Rabot between Mount Counts and Bartrum Plateau to enter Marsh Glacier. Named in association with Mount Rabot by the NZGSAE, 1961–62.

== See also ==
- List of glaciers in the Antarctic

== Sources ==
- Alberts, Fred G., ed. (1995), Geographic Names of the Antarctic (PDF) (2 ed.), United States Board on Geographic Names This article incorporates public domain material from websites or documents of the United States Board on Geographic Names.
- This article incorporates public domain material from websites or documents of the United States Geological Survey.
