= Lowery Glacier =

Glacier in Antarctica

- Location within Antarctica
- Coordinates: 82°35′S 163°15′E
- Length: 110 kilometres (68 mi)
- Terminus: Nimrod Glacier

Lowery Glacier (82°35′S 163°15′E) is a glacier about 60 nautical miles (110 km) long, a tributary of the Nimrod Glacier, which enters the west of the Ross Ice Shelf, Antarctica.

== Location ==
The Lowery Glacier flows north from Prince Andrew Plateau, Antarctica, along the east side of the Queen Elizabeth Range to enter Nimrod Glacier. To the north of Softbed Ridges it converges with Robb Glacier, but the two glaciers separate when they reach Taylor Hills.

It was named by the New Zealand Geological and Topographical Survey Expedition (1959–60) for J.H. Lowery who, as a member of a field party, suffered injuries when a Sno-cat broke through a crevasse bridge off Cape Selborne in November 1959.

== Icefalls ==
=== Arai Terraces ===
83°12′S 163°36′E. A series of crevassed terraces and icefalls close southward of Fazekas Hills, near the head of Lowery Glacier. So named by the NZGSAE (1959-60) because the feature is a natural barrier to sledge travel which the party was unable to traverse. Arai is the Maori term for barrier.

== Left tributaries ==
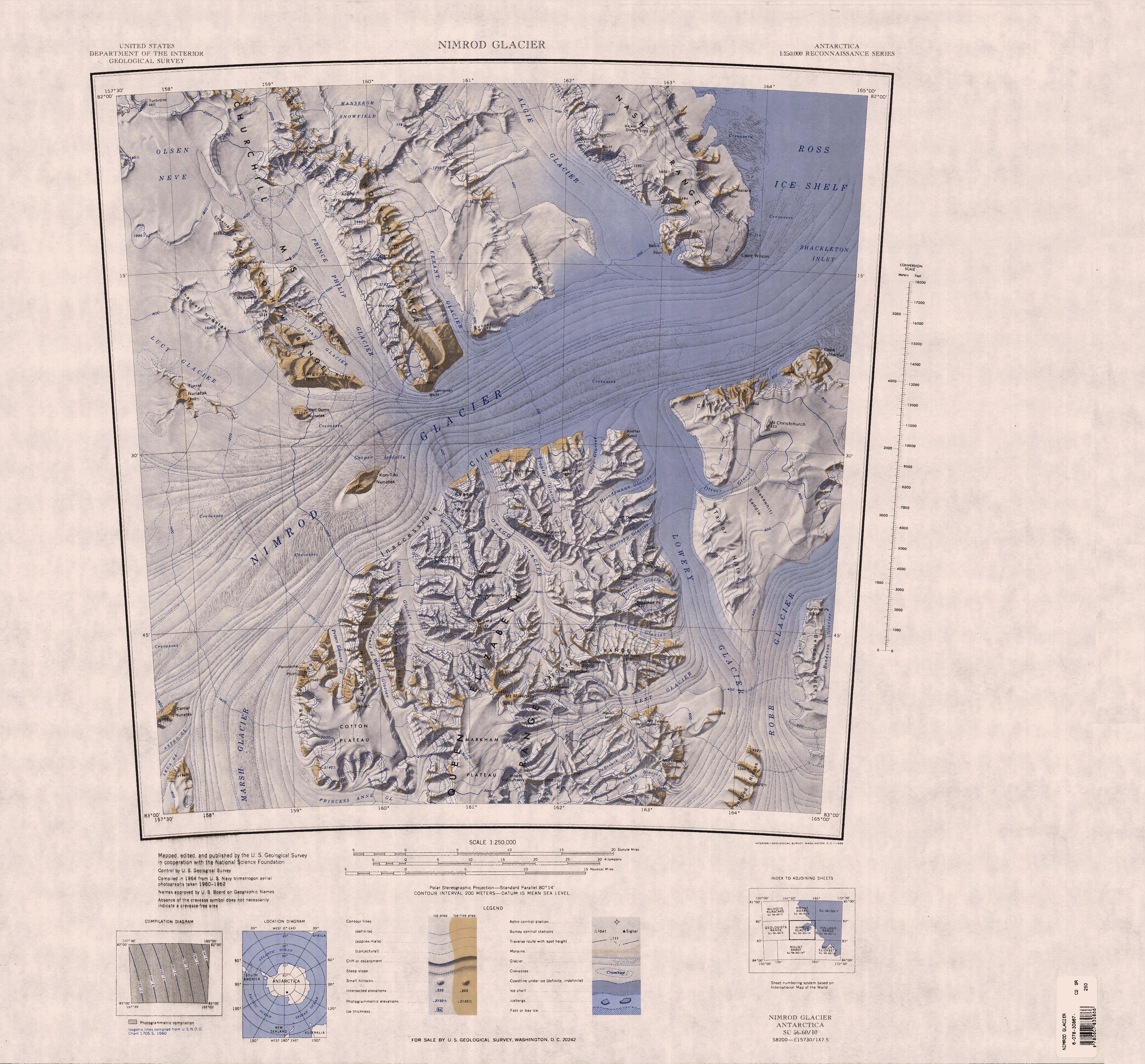
Nimrod Glacier and lower Lowery Glacier (east)

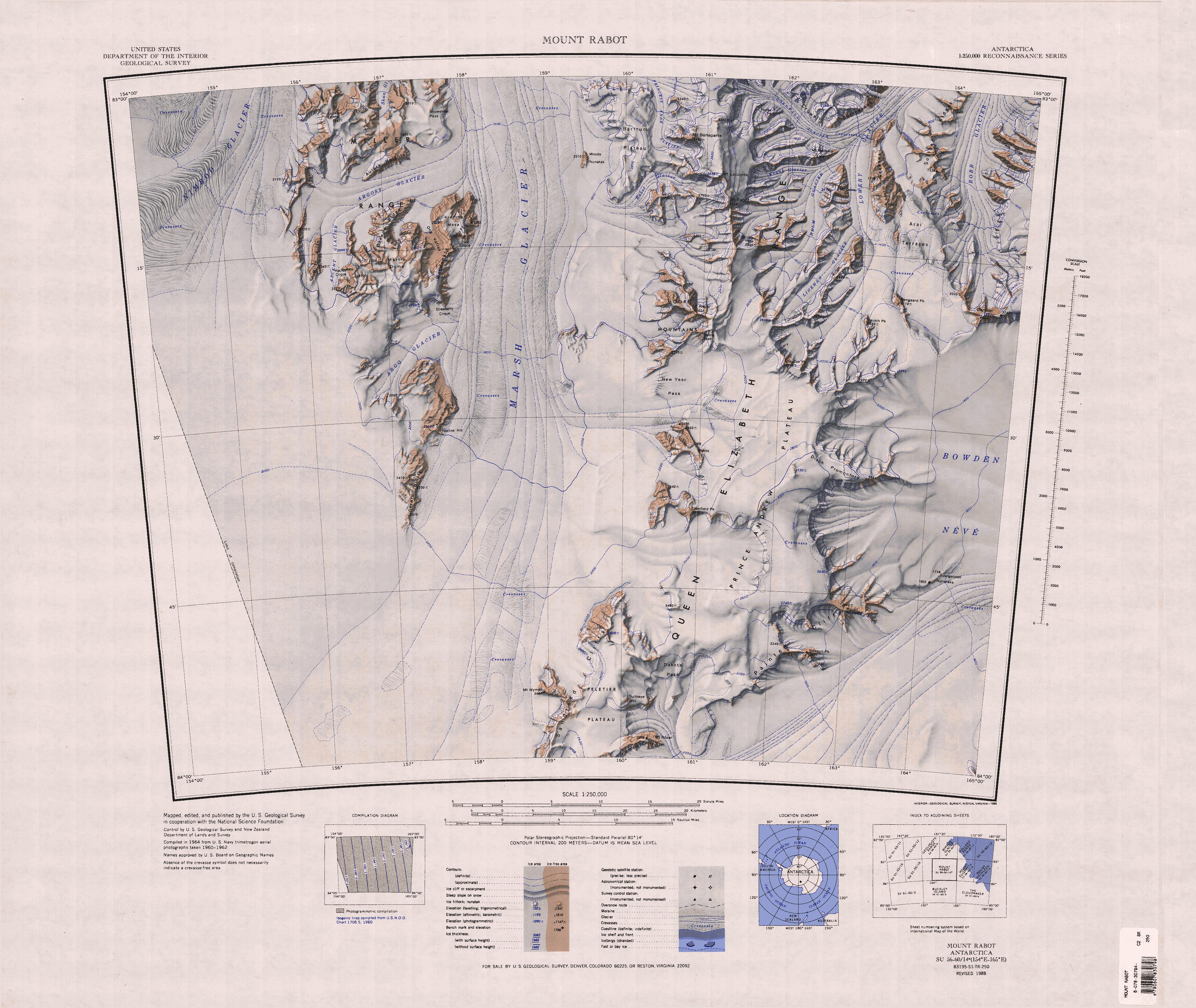
Queen Elizabeth Range and upper Lowery Glacier (east)

Tributaries entering from the left (west) include:

=== Cornwall Glacier ===
83°04′S 162°20′E. A glacier in the Queen Elizabeth Range, draining eastward, to the south of Crowell Buttresses, to enter Lowery Glacier. Named by the Northern Party of NZGSAE (1961-62) after the English County and Dukedom of Cornwall.

=== Dorrer Glacier ===
82°41′S 163°05′E. Glacier just south of Mount Heiser, flowing east into Lowery Glacier from the northeast slopes of the Queen Elizabeth Range. Mapped by the USGS from tellurometer surveys and Navy air photos, 1960-62. Named by US-ACAN for Egon Dorrer, USARP glaciologist on the Ross Ice Shelf 1962-63 and 1965-66.

=== Heidemann Glacier ===
82°33′S 162°50′E. Glacier, 5 miles (8.0 km) long, originating close northwest of Mount Damm in the Queen Elizabeth Range and flowing east into Lowery Glacier. Mapped by the USGS from tellurometer surveys and Navy air photos, 1960-62. Named by US-ACAN for Richard P. Heidemann, USARP glaciologist at Roosevelt Island, 1962-63. Not: Heindemann Glacier.

=== Helm Glacier ===
83°07′S 162°30′E. Glacier 15 miles (24 km) long, flowing north to enter Lowery Glacier just west of Fazekas Hills, in the Queen Elizabeth Range. Named for Arthur S. Helm, former Secretary of the Ross Sea Committee, by the NZGSAE (1961-62).

=== Kent Glacier ===
82°50′S 163°10′E. Glacier which drains the east side of Markham Plateau in the Queen Elizabeth Range and flows east for about 15 miles (24 km) to enter Lowery Glacier. Named by the northern party of the NZGSAE (1961-62) after the English county and the Dukedom of Kent.

=== Linehan Glacier ===
83°15′S 162°41′E. A glacier, 11 miles (18 km) long, flowing northeast from Prince Andrew Plateau along the north side of Turnabout Ridge to enter Lowery Glacier. Named by US-ACAN for French Daniel Linehan, who made seismic soundings of ice thickness from the USS Atka, 1954-55, and in the Ross Sea area, 1955-56.

=== Nottarp Glacier ===
82°37′S 162°54′E. Small glacier draining eastward into Lowery Glacier just south of Mount Damm in the Queen Elizabeth Range. Mapped by the USGS from tellurometer surveys and Navy air photos, 1960-62. Named by US-AC AN for Klemens J. Nottarp, USARP glaciologist on the Ross Ice Shelf, 1962-63 and 1965-66.

=== Pavlak Glacier ===
82°58′S 163°12′E. A glacier that drains east from the Queen Elizabeth Range into Lowery Glacier close south of Mount Predoehl. Mapped by the USGS from tellurometer surveys and Navy air photos, 1960-62. Named by US-ACAN for Thomas L. Pavlak, USARP glaciologist at South Pole Station, 1962-63.

=== Rowland Glacier ===
82°46′S 163°10′E. Glacier on the north side of the Frigate Range, flowing east into Lowery Glacier. Mapped by the USGS from tellurometer surveys and Navy air photos, 1960-62. Named by US-ACAN for Robert W. Rowland, USARP glaciologist at South Pole Station, 1962-63 and 1963-64.

== Right tributaries ==
Tributaries entering from the right (east) include:

=== Oliver Glacier ===
82°34′S 163°45′E Glacier draining the area west and south of Mount Christchurch and entering Lowery Glacier just north of the Taylor Hills. Mapped by the USGS from tellurometer surveys and Navy air photos, 1960-62. Named by US-ACAN for Edward J. Oliver, USARP glaciologist at South Pole Station, 1961-62.

=== Robb Glacier ===
82°38′S 165°00′E. A glacier about 40 miles (64 km) long, flowing from Clarkson Peak north along the east side of Softbed Ridges to the Ross Ice Shelf at Cape Goldie. Named by the expedition after Murray Robb, leader of the NZGSAE (1959-60), who traversed this glacier to reach Lowery Glacier.

== Sources ==
- Alberts, Fred G., ed. (1995), Geographic Names of the Antarctic (PDF) (2 ed.), United States Board on Geographic Names This article incorporates public domain material from websites or documents of the United States Board on Geographic Names.
- Nimrod Glacier, USGS
- This article incorporates public domain material from websites or documents of the United States Geological Survey.
