= Queen Elizabeth Range (Antarctica) =

Mountain range in Antarctica

- Location within Antarctica

Highest point
- Peak: Mount Markham
- Elevation: 4,350 m (14,270 ft)
- Coordinates: 82°51′S 161°21′E

Geography
- Continent: Antarctica
- Region: Shackleton Coast
- Range coordinates: 83°20′S 161°30′E
- Parent range: Transantarctic Mountains

The Queen Elizabeth Range (83°20′S 161°30′E) is a rugged mountain range that parallels the eastern side of Marsh Glacier for nearly 100 nmi (190 km; 120 mi) from Nimrod Glacier in the north to Law Glacier in the south. Mount Markham, 4,350 metres (14,270 ft) high, is the highest elevation in the range.

== Name ==
The Queen Elizabeth Range was named by J.H. Miller of the New Zealand party of the Commonwealth Trans-Antarctic Expedition (CTAE; 1956–58) who, with G.W. Marsh, explored this area. It was named for Queen Elizabeth II of the United Kingdom, the patron of the expedition.

== Location ==
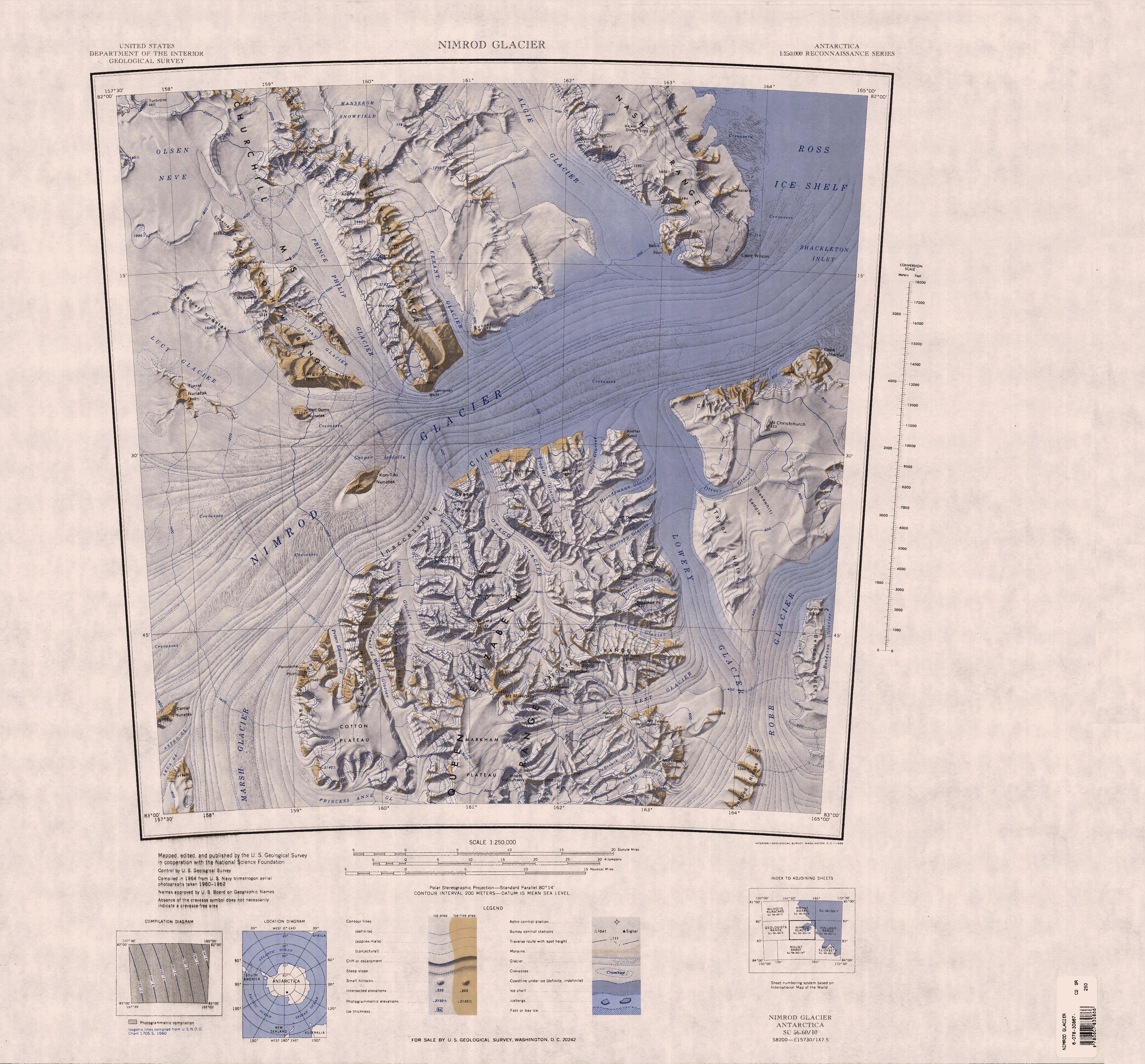
Northern part of Queen Elizabeth Range to the south of Nimrod Glacier

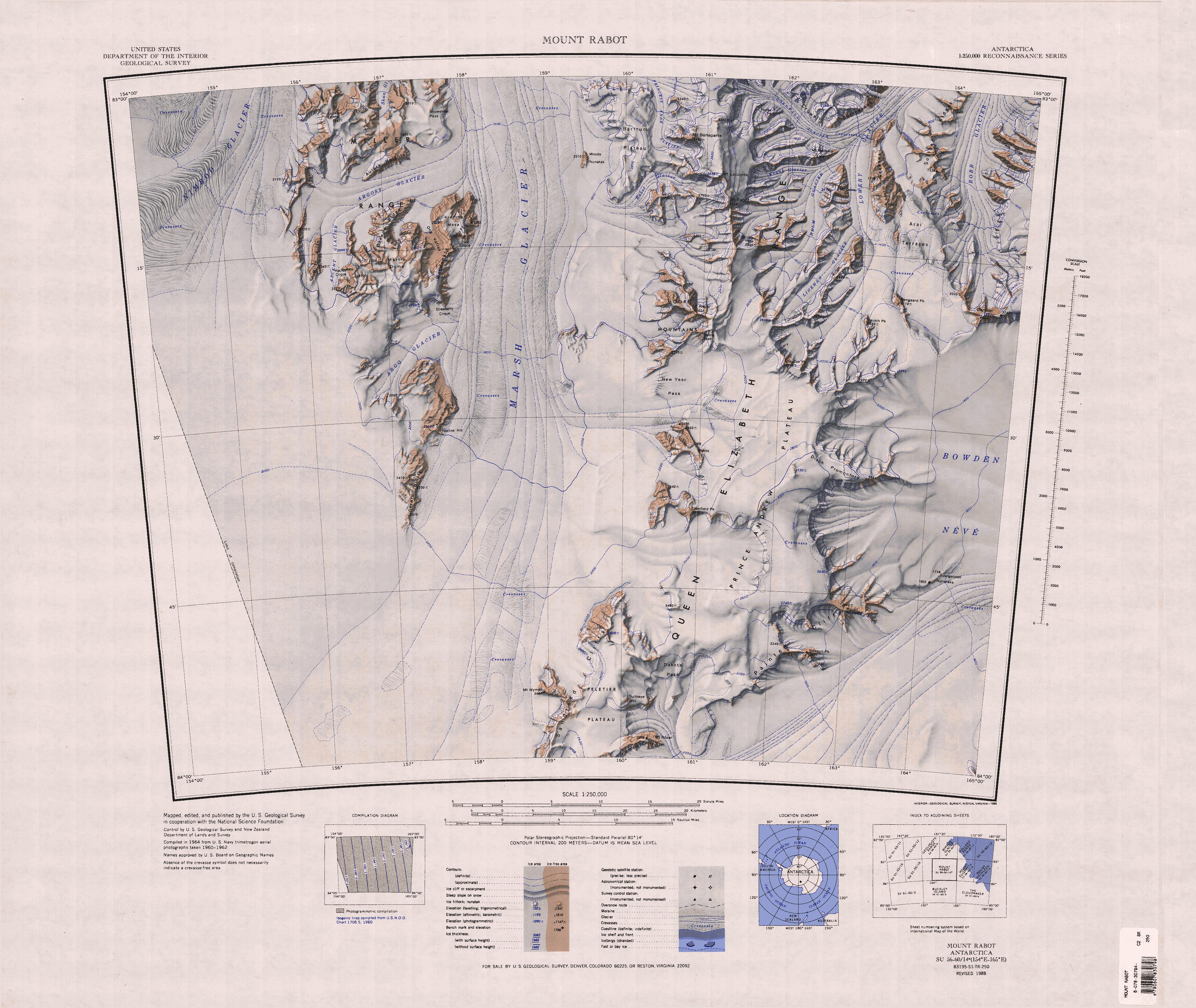
Southern part of Queen Elizabeth Range

The Queen Elizabeth Range is bounded to the north by the Nimrod Glacier, which separates it from the Churchill Mountains and Nash Range. To the east the Lowery Glacier and Robb Glacier separate it from the Holland Range. The Law Glacier to the south separates its from the Colbert Hills and Queen Alexandra Range. The Marsh Glacier separates it from the Miller Range to the west.

== Major glaciers ==
- Nimrod Glacier (82°21′S 163°00′E), a major glacier, about 85 nautical miles (157 km; 98 mi) long, flowing from the polar plateau in a northerly direction between the Geologists Range and Miller Range, then northeasterly between the Churchill Mountains and Queen Elizabeth Range, and finally spilling into Shackleton Inlet and the Ross Ice Shelf between Cape Wilson and Cape Lyttelton.
- Lowery Glacier (82°35′S 163°15′E), a glacier about 60 nautical miles (110 km; 69 mi) long, which flows north from Prince Andrew Plateau along the east side of Queen Elizabeth Range to enter Nimrod Glacier.
- Robb Glacier (82°38′S 165°00′E), a glacier about 40 nautical miles (74 km; 46 mi) long, flowing from Clarkson Peak north along the east side of Softbed Ridges to the Ross Ice Shelf at Cape Goldie.
- Law Glacier (84°05′S 161°00′E), a glacier about 10 nautical miles (19 km; 12 mi) wide between the south end of Queen Elizabeth Range and the MacAlpine Hills, gradually descending east-north-east from the polar plateau to Bowden Névé.
- Marsh Glacier (82°52′S 158°30′E), a glacier about 70 nautical miles (130 km; 81 mi) long, flowing north from the polar plateau between the Miller Range and Queen Elizabeth Range into Nimrod Glacier.

== Features ==
Prominent features or groups of features include:

- Cotton Plateau (82°54′S 159°40′E), a snow-covered plateau just east of the mouth of Marsh Glacier.
- Svaton Peaks (82°35′S 161°00′E), a cluster of rugged peaks at the north end of the Queen Elizabeth Range, surmounting the area between the mouths of the Heilman Glacier and Otago Glacier.
- Sherwin Peak (82°37′S 161°48′E), a peak, 2,290 metres (7,510 ft) high, surmounting the east side of Otago Glacier 5 nautical miles (9.3 km; 5.8 mi) southeast of Mount Chivers, in the north part of the Queen Elizabeth Range.
- Mount Markham (82°51′S 161°21′E), a majestic twin-peaked massif surmounting the north end of the Markham Plateau. The peaks have elevations of 4,350 metres (14,270 ft) and 4,280 metres (14,040 ft).
- Frigate Range (82°48′S 162°20′E), a high mountain range extending 12 nautical miles (22 km) east from Mount Markham in the Queen Elizabeth Range of Antarctica.
- Mount Rabot (83°11′S 161°17′E), a mountain, 3,335 metres (10,942 ft) high, standing 3 nautical miles (5.6 km; 3.5 mi) southeast of Mount Lecointe.
- Moore Mountains (83°21′S 160°45′E), a small but conspicuous group of mountains just north of New Year Pass in the Queen Elizabeth Range in Antarctica.
- Ārai Terraces (83°12′S 163°36′E), a series of crevassed terraces and icefalls close southward of Fazekas Hills, near the head of Lowery Glacier.
- Prince Andrew Plateau (83°38′S 162°00′E), an ice-covered plateau, about 40 nautical miles (74 km; 46 mi) long and 15 nautical miles (28 km; 17 mi) wide, lying south of Mount Rabot.
- Peletier Plateau (83°55′S 159°40′E), an ice-covered plateau, about 20 nautical miles (37 km; 23 mi) long and 5 nautical miles (9.3 km; 5.8 mi) wide, forming the southern part of Queen Elizabeth Range.

== Sources ==
- Alberts, Fred G., ed. (1995), Geographic Names of the Antarctic (PDF) (2 ed.), United States Board on Geographic Names This article incorporates public domain material from websites or documents of the United States Board on Geographic Names.
- Buckley Island, USGS: United States Geological Survey
- Mount Rabot, USGS: United States Geological Survey
- Nimrod Glacier, USGS: United States Geological Survey
- This article incorporates public domain material from websites or documents of the United States Geological Survey.
