= Taylor Hills =

Set of hills in Montana, United States

- Location within Montana

Highest point
- Elevation: 3,474 ft (1,059 m)
- Coordinates: 45°39′17″N 104°27′47″W

Geography
- Country: United States
- State: Montana

The Taylor Hills, elevation 3,474 feet (1,059 m), is a set of hills southeast of Ekalaka, Montana, in Carter County, Montana.

== See also ==
- List of mountain ranges in Montana
