= Algie (disambiguation) =

Algie is a surname, given name and nickname.

- Algie (surname)

Algie may also refer to:

- Algie Glacier, Antarctica
- Algie Knoll, Antarctica
- al-Jiyya, a Palestinian village which is sometimes transliterated as Algie
- Algie, one of the most famous of the Pink Floyd pigs show props

== See also ==
- Algae (disambiguation)
