= Carnegie Range =

Mountain range in Antarctica

- Location within Antarctica

Geography
- Location: Antarctica
- Region: Ross Dependency
- Range coordinates: 82°11′S 161°10′E

The Carnegie Range (82°11′S 161°10′E) is a mountain range in the Churchill Mountains of the Transantarctic Mountains System, in the Ross Dependency of Antarctica.

== Location ==
The Carnegie Range is 18 nautical miles (33 km) long, running north–south between Errant Glacier and the Holyoake Range on the west and Algie Glacier and the Nash Range on the east. The range rises to over 1,400 metres (4,600 ft) and is ice-covered except for peaks and ridges in the northern portion and Russell Bluff at the south end.

It was named by the Advisory Committee on Antarctic Names after Andrew Carnegie, American industrialist of Scottish birth who established numerous foundations and endowments for education, research, and social advancement, including the provision of public libraries in the United States, Great Britain, and other English speaking countries.

== Features ==
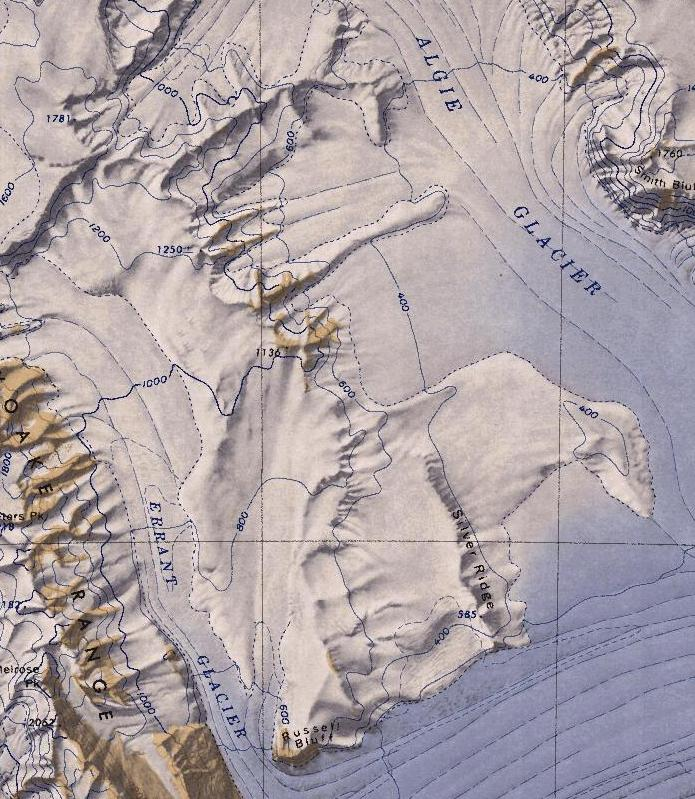
Carnegie Range and surroundings

=== McClintock Ridge ===
82°3′S 161°0′E. A prominent east–west ridge that is ice-covered, 6 nautical miles (11 km) north of Rubin Peak in the Carnegie Range of the Churchill Mountains, Antarctica. The ridge comprises several aligned summits that descend the east slope of the range for 7 nautical miles (13 km), ending at Algie Glacier. The western portion, near Mansergh Wall, rises to over 1,400 metres (4,600 ft); elevations decline to 400 metres (1,300 ft) near Algie Glacier. The ridge was named by the Advisory Committee on Antarctic Names after Barbara McClintock of the Department of Genetics, Carnegie Institution, Cold Spring Harbor, New York, 1942–67, although she continued full-time research, supported by Carnegie, until her death. McClintock was awarded the Nobel Prize in Physiology or Medicine in 1983.

=== Rubin Peak ===
82°10′S 161°9′E. A prominent rock summit rising to over 1,100 metres (3,600 ft) in the central part of Carnegie Range, Churchill Mountains. The peak is 11 nautical miles (20 km) north of Russell Bluff. Named by Advisory Committee on Antarctic Names (US-ACAN) after Vera Rubin, observational astronomer, Department of Terrestrial Magnetism, Carnegie Institution of Washington, 1965–2002; with Carnegie Institution co-worker Kent Ford, Rubin confirmed that most of the universe consists of dark matter, 1978.

== Nearby Features ==
=== Mansergh Snowfield ===
82°1′S 159°50′E A snowfield in Antarctica feeding the central portion of Starshot Glacier, separating the Surveyors Range and Holyoake Range. It was seen by the Holyoake, Cobham and Queen Elizabeth Ranges party of the New Zealand Geological Survey Antarctic Expedition (1964–65) and named for G. Mansergh, a geologist with the party.

=== Russell Bluff ===
82°21′S 161°06′E. An ice-free bluff at the east side of the mouth of Errant Glacier, at the juncture with Nimrod Glacier. Mapped by the USGS from tellurometer surveys and Navy air photos, 1960-62. Named by US-ACAN for John Russell, USARP traverse specialist at McMurdo Sound, 1959.

=== Silver Ridge ===
82°16′S 161°40′E. A long snow-covered ridge lying west of the mouth of Algie Glacier, being a prominent landmark on the north side of Nimrod Glacier. So named by the southern party of the NZGSAE (1960-61) because of the absence of rock on this steep-sided feature.

=== Algie Knoll ===
82°12′S 162°9′E. A rounded ice-covered elevation rising to 400 metres (1,300 ft) between Silver Ridge and the mouth of Algie Glacier. Named by Advisory Committee on Antarctic Names in association with Algie Glacier.

== Sources ==
- Alberts, Fred G., ed. (1995), Geographic Names of the Antarctic (PDF) (2 ed.), United States Board on Geographic Names This article incorporates public domain material from websites or documents of the United States Board on Geographic Names.
- "Algie Knoll", Geographic Names Information System, United States Geological Survey, United States Department of the Interior
- "Carnegie Range", Geographic Names Information System, United States Geological Survey, United States Department of the Interior
- "Mansergh Snowfield", Geographic Names Information System, United States Geological Survey, United States Department of the Interior
- "McClintock Ridge", Geographic Names Information System, United States Geological Survey, United States Department of the Interior
- "Rubin Peak", Geographic Names Information System, United States Geological Survey, United States Department of the Interior
- This article incorporates public domain material from websites or documents of the United States Geological Survey.
