= Mount Hayter =

Mountain in Oates Land, Antarctica

Coordinates: 82°2′S 157°26′E

Mount Hayter is a peak in Antarctica, 2,690 metres (8,830 ft) high, standing 1 nautical mile (2 km) southeast of Laird Plateau on the west side of Olson Neve. It was seen by the New Zealand Geological Survey Antarctic Expedition (1964–65) and named for Adrian Hayter, leader at Scott Base in 1965.
