= Algie =

Algie (/ˈældʒiː/ AL-jee) is a family name, originating from Jacobo Algeo, from Italy in 1420. He travelled to Scotland in 1453. Many Scottish Algeos descended from him later changed the name to Algie approximately six generations later, while others later changed their surname once again to Elgee. Some Elgees migrated to Ireland, while others eventually migrated to the United States and Canada from Scotland and Ireland.

== People ==
=== Surname ===
- Algie (surname)

=== First name ===
- Algie Eggertsen Ballif (1896–1984), educational leader and politician in Utah
- Algie Howell (born 1938), American politician
- Algie Martin Simons (1870–1950), American socialist journalist, newspaper editor and political activist

=== Nickname ===
- Algernon Gissing (1860–1937), English writer and novelist
- Algernon Algie McBride (1869–1956), American baseball player
- Algernon Algie Rainbow (1885–1969), New Zealand accountant, company director and local politician
- Algernon Stanley Smith (1890–1978), British Protestant Christian missionary in Uganda and Ruanda

== Fictional characters ==
- the title character of Algie the Miner, a 1912 film
- the protagonist of Algie's Romance, a 1918 Australian film
