= Chappell Nunataks =

The Chappell Nunataks (82°18′S 158°12′E) are a group of nunataks 3 nautical miles (6 km) west of the central part of the Cobham Range. They were named by the New Zealand Geological Survey Antarctic Expedition (1964–65) for J. Chappell, geologist with the expedition.
