= Olson Névé =

Olson Névé (82°07′00″S 158°00′00″E) is a névé on the northwest side of the Cobham Range, which nourishes the Lucy and Prince Philip Glaciers, in the Churchill Mountains, Antarctica. It was mapped by the Holyoake, Cobham and Queen Elizabeth Ranges party of the New Zealand Geological Survey Antarctic Expedition (1964-1965), and named for Lieutenant Dennis A. Olson, United States Navy, who flew the New Zealand party to the névé and supported it during the summer season. The feature is incorrectly identified as "Olsen Névé" on some maps of the late 1960s.
