= Geologists Range =

Antarctic mountain range

- Location within Antarctica

Geography
- Location: Antarctica
- Range coordinates: 82°30′S 155°30′E

The Geologists Range is a mountain range about 55 km (34 mi) long, standing between the heads of Lucy and Nimrod Glaciers in Antarctica. Seen by the northern party of the New Zealand Geological Survey Antarctic Expedition (NZGSAE) (1961–62) and named to commemorate the work of geologists in Antarctic exploration. The Churchill Mountains are to the north, the Queen Elizabeth Range to the east and the Miller Range to the southeast

== Glaciers ==
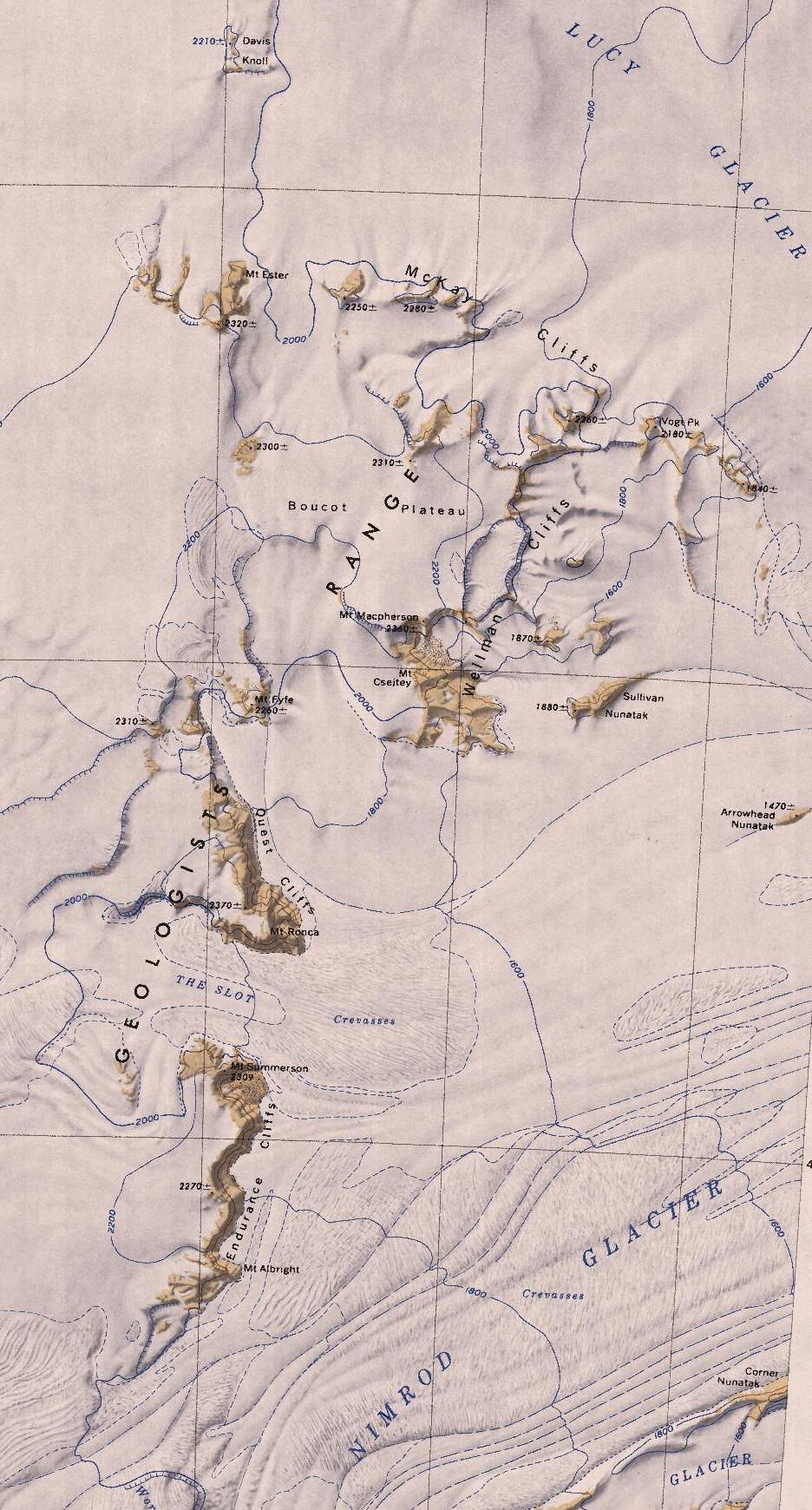
Map of the range

The Geologists Range lies between Nimrod Glacier to the southeast and Lucy Glacier to the northeast. It contains The Slot, a small tributary of the Nimrod Glacier.

- Nimrod Glacier (82°21′S 163°00′E), a major glacier, about 85 miles (137 km) long, flowing from the polar plateau in a northerly direction between the Geologists and Miller Ranges, then northeasterly between the Churchill Mountains and Queen Elizabeth Range, and finally spilling into Shackleton Inlet and the Ross Ice Shelf between Capes Wilson and Lyttelton.
- Lucy Glacier (82°24′S 158°25′E), a wide glacier which flows southeast from the polar plateau, between Laird Plateau and McKay Cliffs, into Nimrod Glacier.
- The Slot (82°40′S 155°05′E), a small swift glacier descending from the polar plateau between Mount Ronca and Mount Summerson.

== Mountains ==
This range includes the following mountains and peaks:

=== Mount Albright ===
82°49′S 155°06′E. A mountain surmounting the southern end of the Endurance Cliffs. Mapped by the United States Geological Survey (USGS) from tellurometer surveys and Navy air photos, 1960–62. Named by Advisory Committee on Antarctic Names (US-ACAN) for John C. Albright, United States Antarctic Research Program (USARP) geologist on the South Pole-Queen Maud Land Traverse, 1964–65.

=== Mount Csejtey ===
82°30′S 155°50′E. A mountain 1.5 nautical miles (2.8 km; 1.7 mi) south of Mount Macpherson in the central part of the range. Mapped by the USGS from tellurometer surveys and U.S. Navy air photos, 1960–62. Named by US-ACAN for Bela Csejtey, U.S. Antarctic Research Program (USARP) geologist at McMurdo Station, 1962–63.

=== Mount Ester ===
82°18′S 155°04′E. A mountain over 2,200 m, surmounting the western part of McKay Cliffs in the Geologists Range. Mapped by the USGS from tellurometer surveys and Navy air photos, 1960-62. Named by US-ACAN for Donald W. Ester, USARP geologist at McMurdo Station, 1962-63.

=== Mount Fyfe ===
82°32′S 155°10′E. A mountain, 2,260 metres (7,410 ft), standing 3 miles (4.8 km) north of Quest Cliffs in the Geologists Range. Seen by the northern party of the NZGSAE (1961-62) and named for H.E. Fyfe, chief geologist of the New Zealand Geological Survey.

=== Mount Isbell ===
2,360 metres (7,743 ft) 82°22′S 156°24′E. A mountain at the northeastern perimeter of the range. The summit is 2.6 miles (4.2 km) west of Vogt Peak. Named by US-ACAN after John L Isbell, Department of Geosciences, University of Wisconsin–Milwaukee; investigator of Permian and Lower Triassic strata of the Darwin and Churchill Mountains in several field seasons, 1992–2001, including work near this mountain.

=== Mount Macpherson ===
2,360 metres (7,743 ft) 82°29′S 155°50′E. Mountain standing 1.5 miles (2.4 km) north of Mount Csejtey on the southern edge of Boucot Plateau. Seen by the northern party of the New Zealand Geological Survey Antarctic Expedition (NZGSAE) (1961–62) and named for E.O. Macpherson, formerly chief geologist of the New Zealand Geological Survey.

=== Mount Ronca ===
82°38′S 155°15′E. Mountain over 2,200 metres (7,200 ft), surmounting the south end of Quest Cliffs in the Geologists Range. Mapped by the USGS from tellurometer surveys and Navy air photos, 1960-62. Named by US-ACAN for Luciano B. Ronca, USARP geologist at McMurdo Station, 1960-61.

=== Sullivan Nunatak ===
82°31′S 156°35′E. Long, narrow nunatak 2 miles (3.2 km) east of the south end of Wellman Cliffs in the Geologists Range. Mapped by the USGS from tellurometer surveys and Navy air photos, 1960-62. Named by the US-ACAN for James G. Sullivan, USARP geologist at McMurdo Station, winter 1961 and the 1961-62 summer season.

=== Mount Summerson ===
2,310 metres (7,579 ft) 82°43′S 155°05′E. Mountain surmounting the northern end of Endurance Cliffs. Mapped by USGS from tellurometer surveys and U.S. Navy air photos, 1960–62. Named by US-ACAN for Charles H. Summerson, U.S. Antarctic Research Program (USARP) geologist to the Mount Weaver area, 1962–63.

=== Vogt Peak ===
2,180 metres (7,152 ft) 82°22′S 156°44′E Peak surmounting the east part of McKay Cliffs. Mapped by the USGS from Tellurometer surveys and U.S. Navy air photos, 1960–62. Named by US-ACAN for Peter R. Vogt, United States Antarctic Research Program (USARP) geologist at McMurdo Station, 1962–63.

== Other features ==
=== Boucot Plateau ===
82°25′S 155°40′E. A small ice-covered plateau which rises west of Wellman Cliffs and south of McKay Cliffs. Mapped by the USGS from tellurometer surveys and U.S. Navy air photos, 1960–62. Named by US-ACAN for Arthur J. Boucot, U.S. Antarctic Research Program (USARP) geologist at Byrd Station and to the Horlick Mountains, 1964–65.

=== Endurance Cliffs ===
82°47′S 155°05′E. A line of steep east-facing cliffs between Mount Summerson and Mount Albright in the southern part of the range. Mapped by the northern party of the NZGSAE (1961–62).

=== McKay Cliffs ===
82°19′S 156°00′E. A line of cliffs about 32 km (20 mi) long, forming the north wall of the range. Seen by the northern party of the NZGSAE (1961–62) and named for Alexander McKay, pioneer New Zealand geologist.

=== Quest Cliffs ===
82°36′S 155°10′E. A line of steep east-facing cliffs immediately north of The Slot in the Geologists Range. Seen by the northern party of the NZGSAE (1961-62) and named after the Quest, the ship of the ShackletonRowett Antarctic Expedition, 1921-22. Not: Quest Nunatak.

=== Wellman Cliffs ===
82°27′S 156°10′E. Prominent cliffs about 20 km (12 mi) long on the east side of Boucot Plateau. Seen by the northern party of the NZGSAE (1961–62) and named for H.W. Wellman, geologist, who devised a simple method of map-making from air photos, used by the expedition.

== Sources ==
- Alberts, Fred G., ed. (1995), Geographic Names of the Antarctic (PDF) (2 ed.), United States Board on Geographic Names This article incorporates public domain material from websites or documents of the United States Board on Geographic Names.
- Geologists Range, USGS United States Geologic Survey, 1960
- "Mount Isbell", Geographic Names Information System, United States Geological Survey, United States Department of the Interior
