= Elgee =

Elgee is a surname. Notable people with the surname include:

- Cyril Hammond Elgee (1871–1917), British colonial administrator in Nigeria
- Frank Elgee (1880–1944), British archaeologist, geologist and naturalist
- Jane Wilde (1821–1896), née Elgee, Irish poet and mother of Oscar Wilde

== See also ==
- Algie
