= Churchill Mountains =

Mountain range in Antarctica

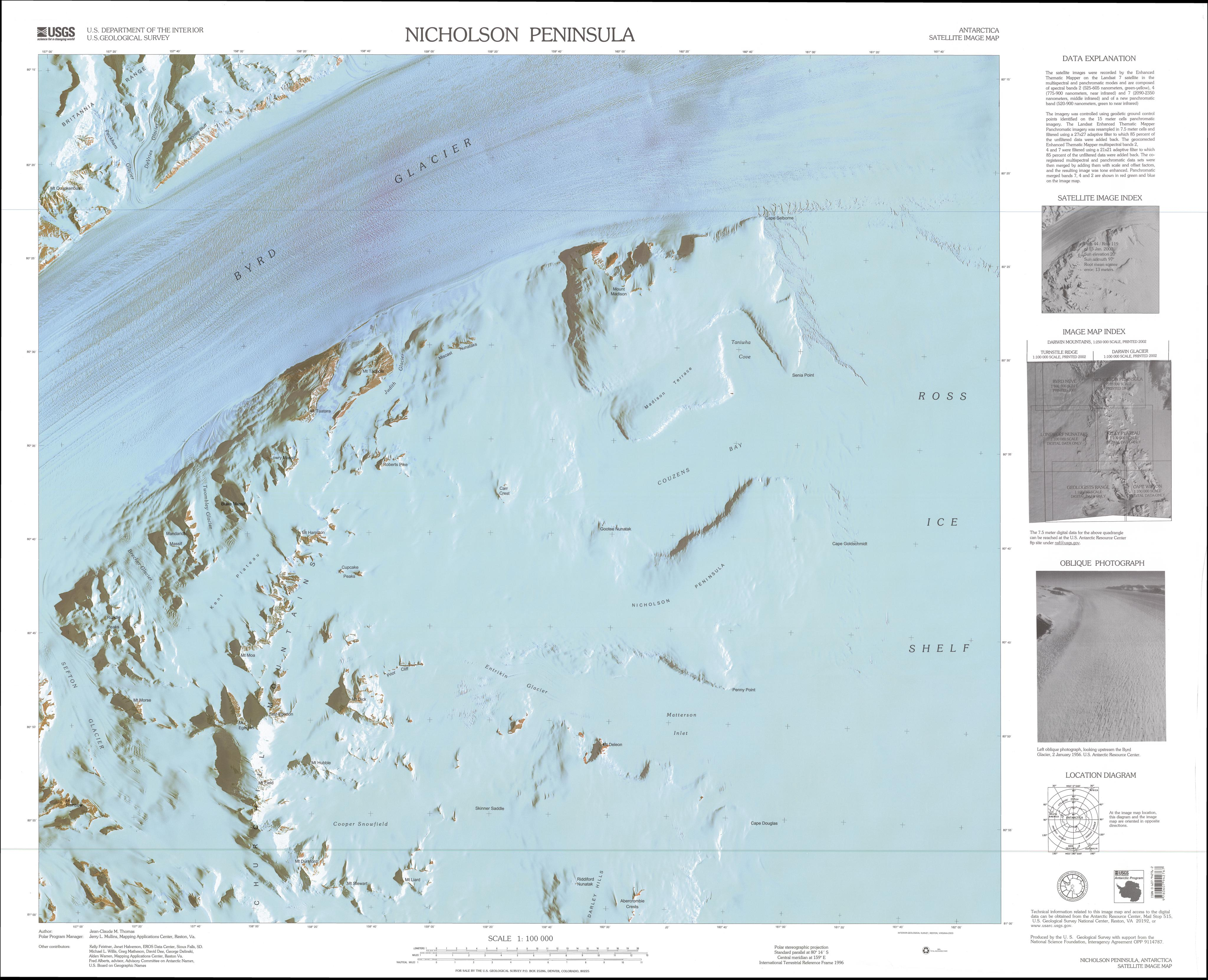
- North tip of the range, and Byrd Glacier

Highest point
- Peak: Mount Albert Markham
- Elevation: 3,205 m (10,515 ft)
- Coordinates: 81°23′S 158°14′E

Geography
- Location within Antarctica
- Continent: Antarctica
- Region: Ross Dependency
- Range coordinates: 81°30′S 158°30′E
- Parent range: Transantarctic Mountains

The Churchill Mountains is a major range of mountains and associated elevations bordering the western side of the Ross Ice Shelf, between Byrd Glacier and Nimrod Glacier. They are south of the Britannia Range and north of the Geologists Range, Miller Range and Queen Elizabeth Range.

== Exploration and naming ==
Several of the range's highest summits, including Mount Egerton, Mount Field, Mount Nares, Mount Wharton, and Mount Albert Markham were first seen and named by the British National Antarctic Expedition of 1901–1904 under Robert Falcon Scott. The mountains were mapped in detail by the USGS from tellurometer surveys during 1960–61, and by United States Navy air photos in 1960. They were named by the United States US-ACAN for Sir Winston Churchill.

== Location ==
The Churchill mountains extend from the Byrd Glacier south to the Nimrod Glacier. The Antarctic Plateau is to their west, with various groups of nunataks, and the Ross Ice Shelf is to their east.

== Mountains and peaks ==
The higher mountains and peaks include:

Mountain	Metres	Feet	Coordinates
Mount Albert Markham	3,205	10,515	81°23′S 158°14′E
Mount Field	3,010	9,880	80°53′S 158°02′E
Mount Nares	3,000	9,800	81°27′S 158°10′E
Mount Egerton	2,830	9,280	80°50′S 157°55′E
Pyramid Mountain	2,810	9,220	81°19′S 158°15′E
Mount Wharton	2,800	9,200	81°03′S 157°49′E
Mount Isbell	2,360	7,740	82°22′S 156°24′E
Mount Frost	2,350	7,710	81°11′S 158°21′E
Mount Zinkovich	2,280	7,480	81°08′S 158°21′E
Turk Peak	2,000	6,600	81°02′S 158°23′E
Mount Hamilton	1,990	6,530	80°40′S 158°17′E
Mount Tuatara	1,640	5,380	80°34′S 158°20′E

== Major glaciers ==
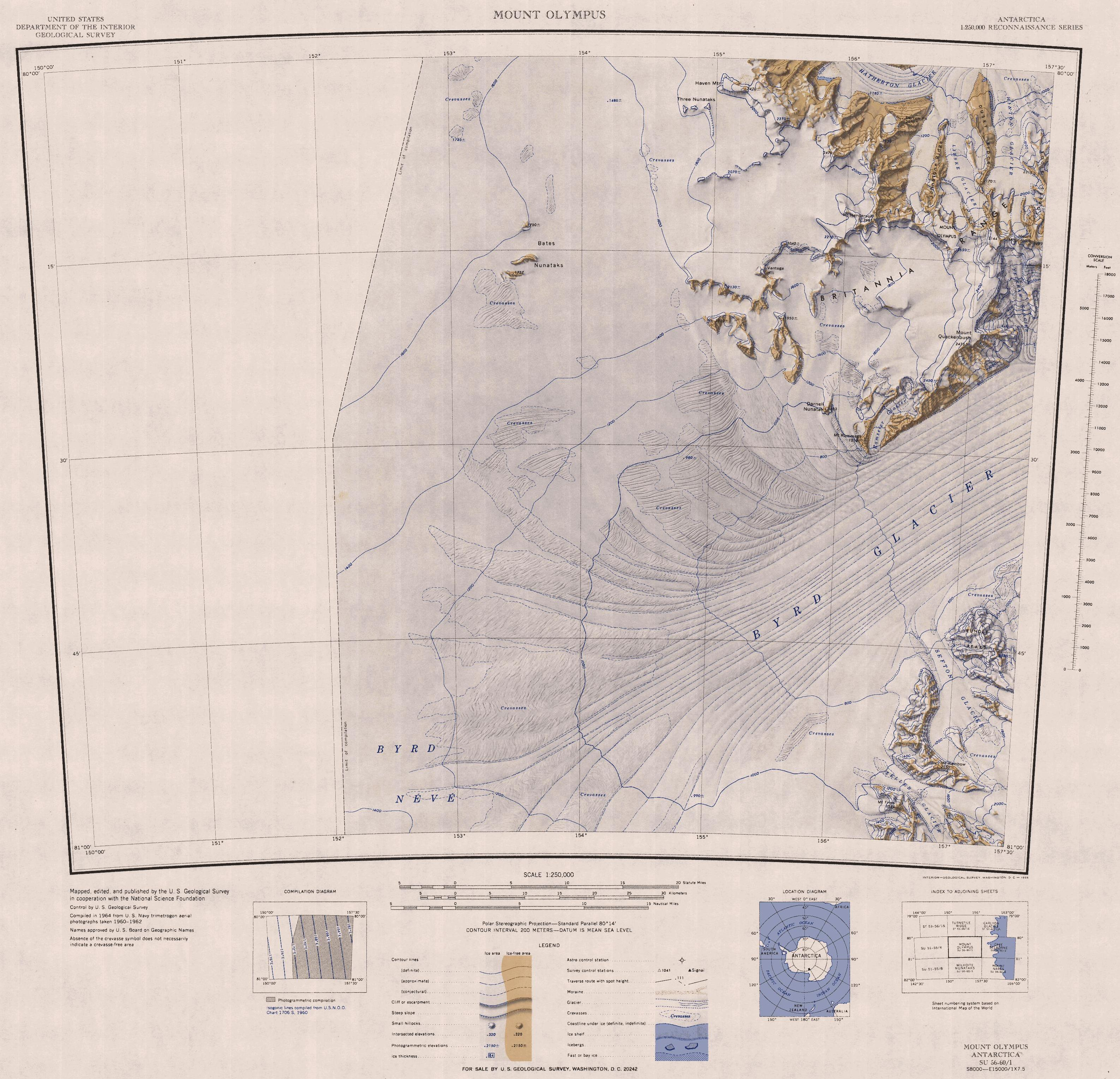
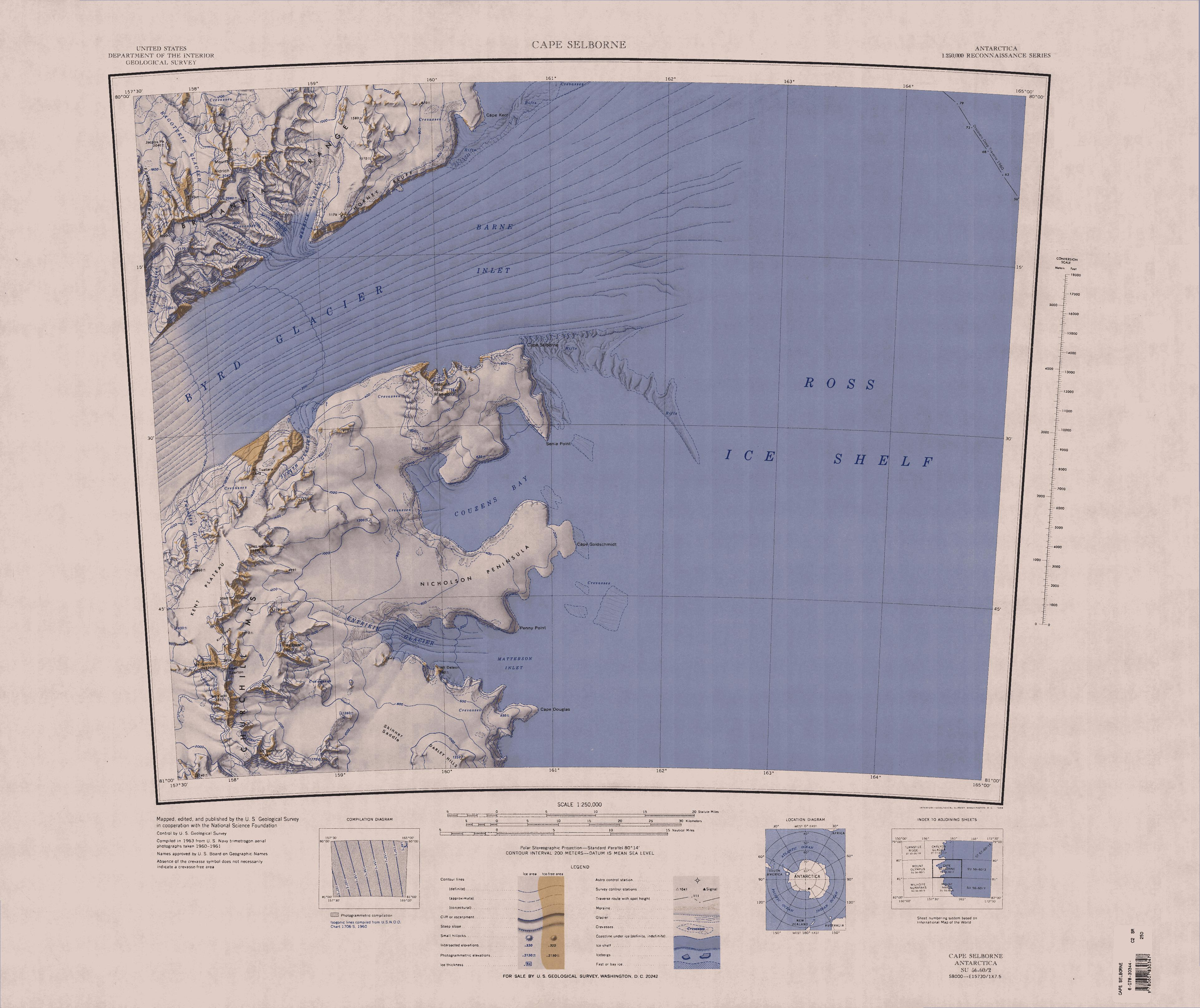
Northern part of range south of Byrd Glacier
- Byrd Glacier (80°20′S 159°00′E), a major glacier in Antarctica, about 136 kilometres (85 mi) long and 24 kilometres (15 mi) wide. It drains an extensive area of the Antarctic plateau, and flows eastward to discharge into the Ross Ice Shelf.
- Nursery Glacier (81°16′S 160°30′E), a coastal glacier about 20 nautical miles (37 km; 23 mi) long that flows southeast along the west side of Darley Hills to enter Ross Ice Shelf just south of Cape Parr.
- Starshot Glacier (81°20′S 160°20′E), a glacier 50 nautical miles (93 km; 58 mi) long that flows from the polar plateau eastward through the Churchill Mountains, then north along the west side of Surveyors Range, entering the Ross Ice Shelf south of Cape Parr.
- Nimrod Glacier (81°21′S 163°00′E) is a major glacier about 85 nautical miles (157 km; 98 mi) long, flowing from the polar plateau in a northerly direction through the Transantarctic Mountains into the Ross Ice Shelf. It flows north between the Geologists Range and Miller Range, then northeasterly between the Churchill Mountains and Queen Elizabeth Range, and finally spills into Shackleton Inlet and the Ross Ice Shelf between Capes Wilson and Lyttelton.

== Sub−ranges ==
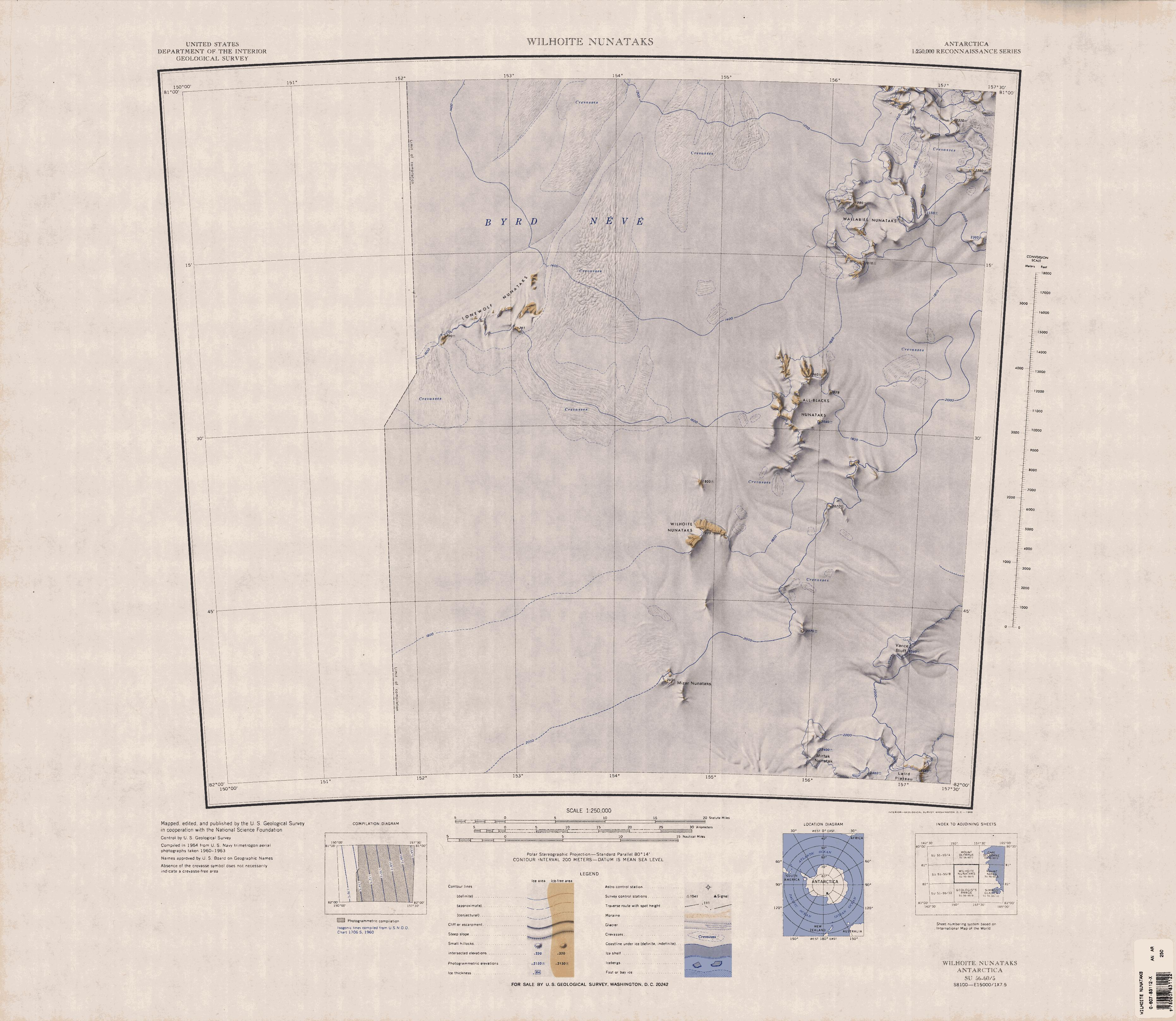
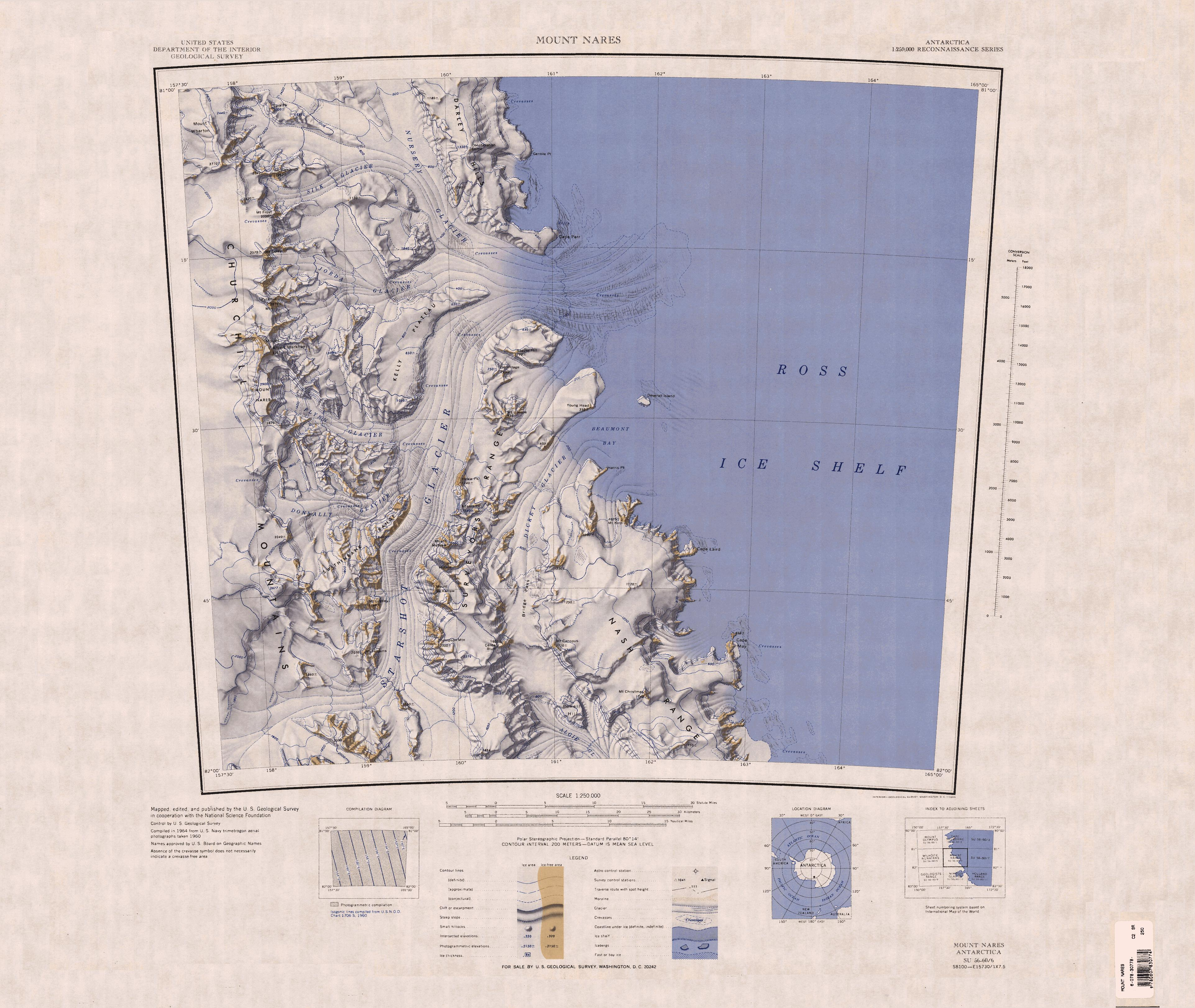
Central part of range

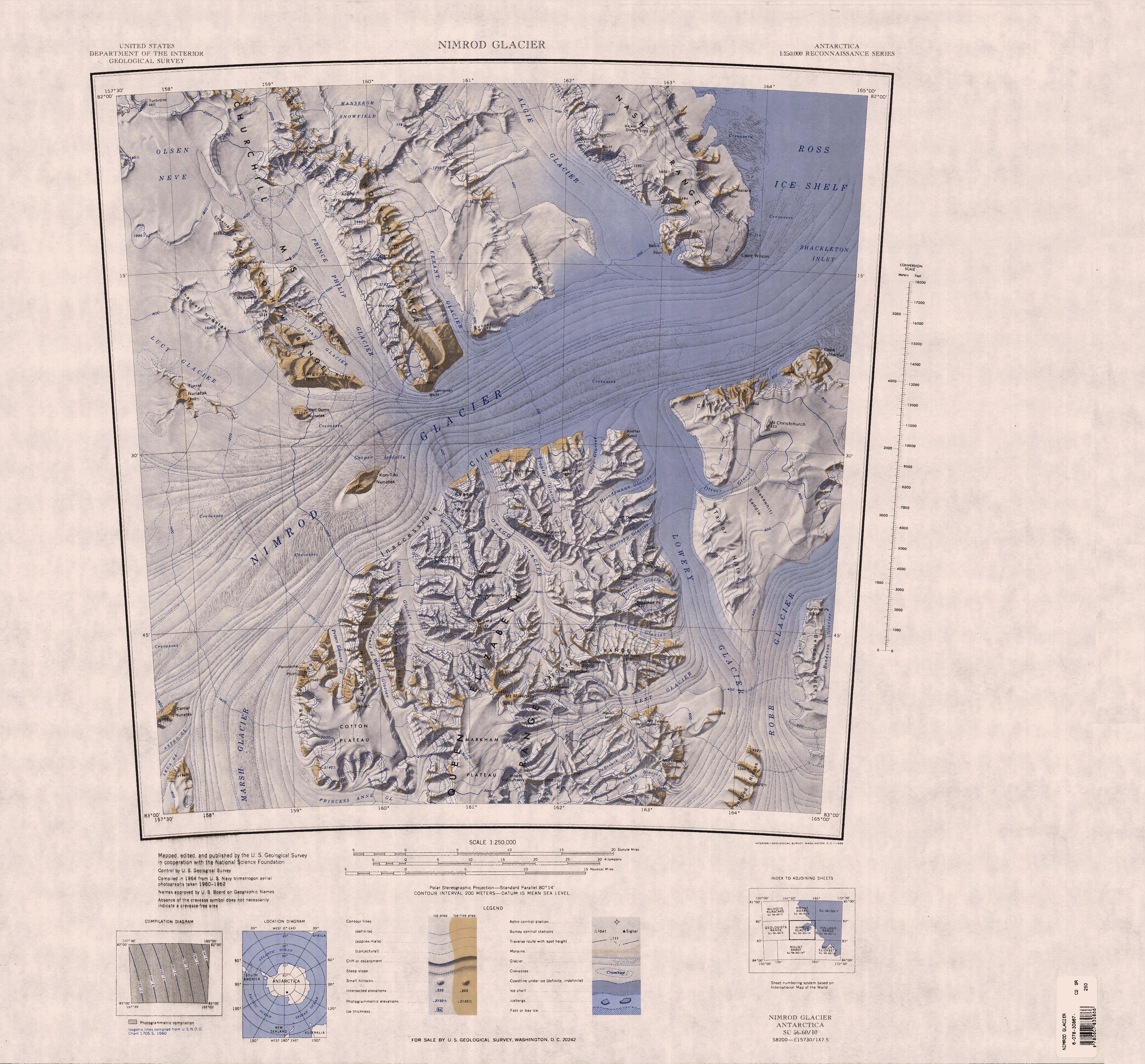
Southern part of range north of Nimrod Glacier

Sub−ranges of the Churchill Mountains include:

- Carlstrom Foothills (81°25′S 159°0′E), a group of peaks and ridges that run north–south between Mount Albert Markham and Kelly Plateau in the Churchill Mountains. The feature is 10 nautical miles (20 km) long with summits rising to 1,690 metres (5,540 ft).
- Carnegie Range (82°11′S 161°10′E), 18 nautical miles (33 km) long, running north–south between Errant Glacier and the Holyoake Range on the west and Algie Glacier and the Nash Range on the east. The range rises to over 1,400 metres (4,600 ft) and is ice-covered except for peaks and ridges in the northern portion and Russell Bluff at the south end.
- Cobham Range (82°18′S 159°0′E), trends in a northwest–southeast direction for about 20 nautical miles (40 km), standing west of Prince Philip Glacier in the southern part of the Churchill Mountains.
- Darley Hills (81°6′S 160°10′E), a range of high, ice-covered coastal hills that overlook the Ross Ice Shelf, and trend north–south for about 20 nautical miles (40 km) between Cape Douglas and Cape Parr.
- Holyoake Range 82°13′S 160°00′E, a range in the south part of the Churchill Mountains, extending in a NW-SE direction for about 25 mi between Prince Philip and Errant Glaciers.
- Nash Range (81°55′S 162°0′E), a mainly ice-covered coastal range, 40 nautical miles (70 km) long, bordering the west side of the Ross Ice Shelf between the Dickey Glacier and Nimrod Glacier.
- Surveyors Range (81°37′S 160°15′E), a 30 miles (48 km) long range extending north along the east side of Starshot Glacier from the Thompson Mountain area to the glacier's terminus at the Ross Ice Shelf.
- Swithinbank Range 81°42′S 159°0′E, a small range extending eastward between Donnally and Ahern Glaciers to the west side of Starshot Glacier.

== Plateaus and snowfields ==
- Kent Plateau (80°44′S 157°50′E), an ice-covered plateau, 12 miles (19 km) long and 4 miles (6.4 km) wide, extending northward from Mount Egerton and Kiwi Pass to the vicinity of Mount Hamilton. It is in the northern extreme of the Churchill Mountains.
- Cooper Snowfield (80°56′S 158°40′E), a snowfield with an area of about 25 square miles (65 km^{2}) that rises to over 1,200 metres (3,900 ft) and is nearly encircled by ridges connecting Mount Field, Mount Durnford, and Mount Liard.
- Chapman Snowfield (81°30′S 157°20′E), a large snowfield lying west of the central ridge in the Churchill Mountains, bounded to the north by Elder Peak and the massif surmounted by Mount Wharton, to the south by Soza Icefalls, Black Icefalls and the head of Starshot Glacier, and to the west by the Wallabies Nunataks and the All-Blacks Nunataks.

== Sources ==
- Alberts, Fred G., ed. (1995), Geographic Names of the Antarctic (PDF) (2 ed.), United States Board on Geographic Names This article incorporates public domain material from websites or documents of the United States Board on Geographic Names.
- "Carlstrom Foothills", Geographic Names Information System, United States Geological Survey, United States Department of the Interior
- "Carnegie Range", Geographic Names Information System, United States Geological Survey, United States Department of the Interior
- "Chapman Snowfield", Geographic Names Information System, United States Geological Survey, United States Department of the Interior
- "Cooper Snowfield", Geographic Names Information System, United States Geological Survey, United States Department of the Interior
- This article incorporates public domain material from websites or documents of the United States Geological Survey.
