= Miller Range =

Mountain range in Antarctica

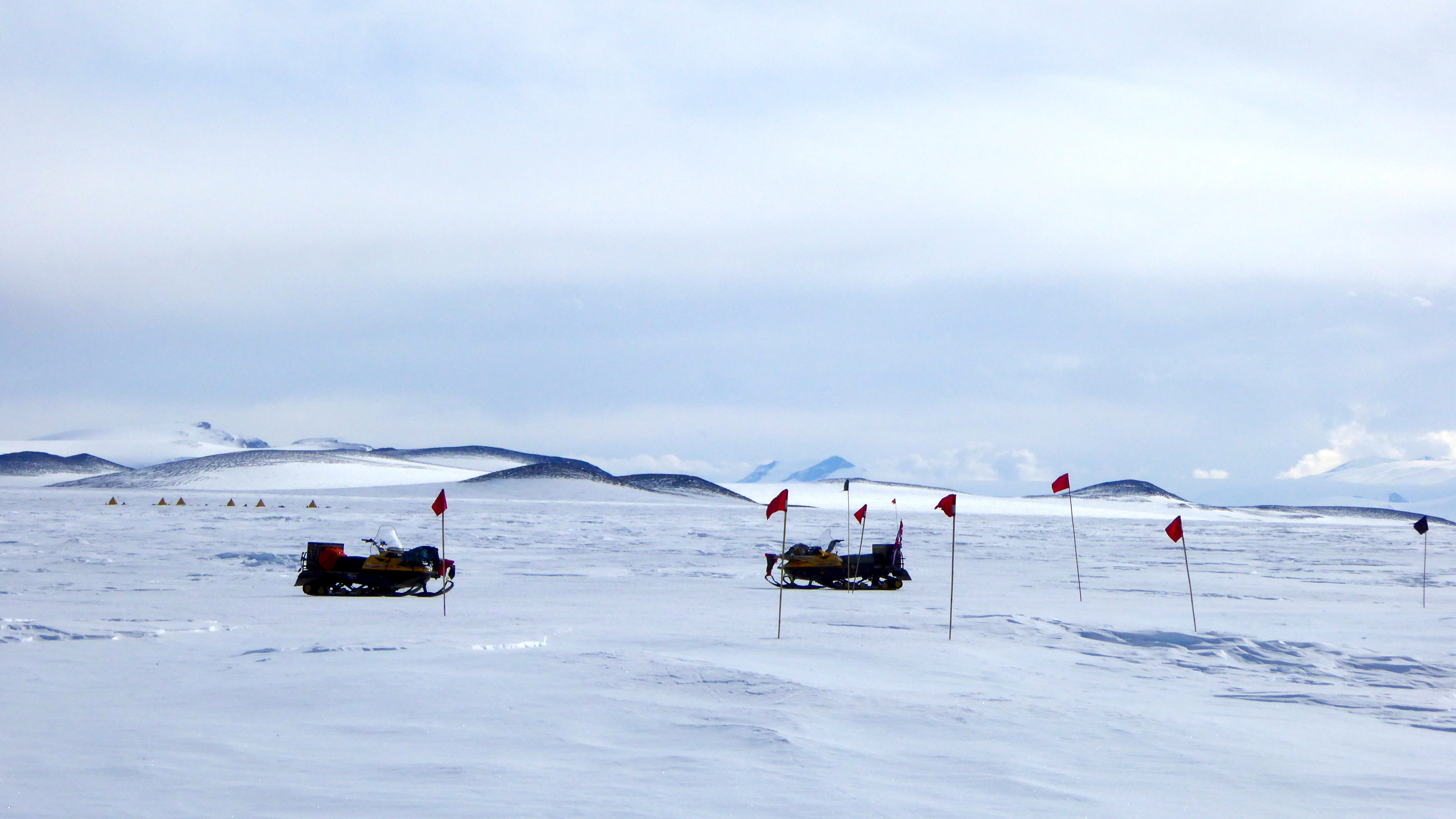
- The ANSMET team searches for meteorites on the blue ice field in the Miller Range 3 January 2016

Highest point
- Elevation: 3,000 m (9,800 ft)

Geography
- Location within Antarctica
- Range coordinates: 83°15′S 157°00′E

The Miller Range (83°15′S 157°00′E) is a mountain range extending south from Nimrod Glacier for 80 km (50 mi) along the western edge of the Marsh Glacier in Antarctica.

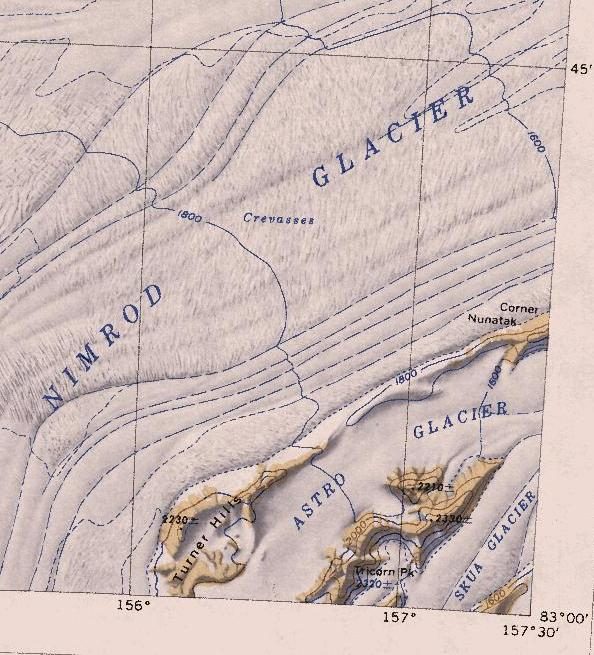
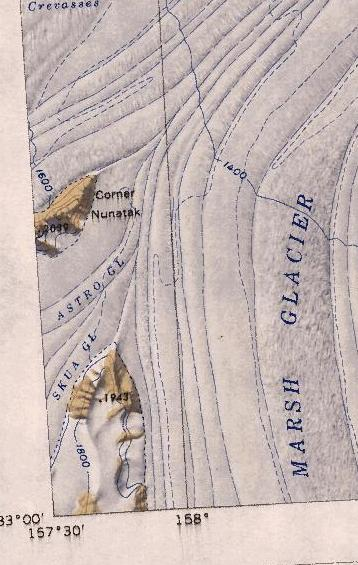
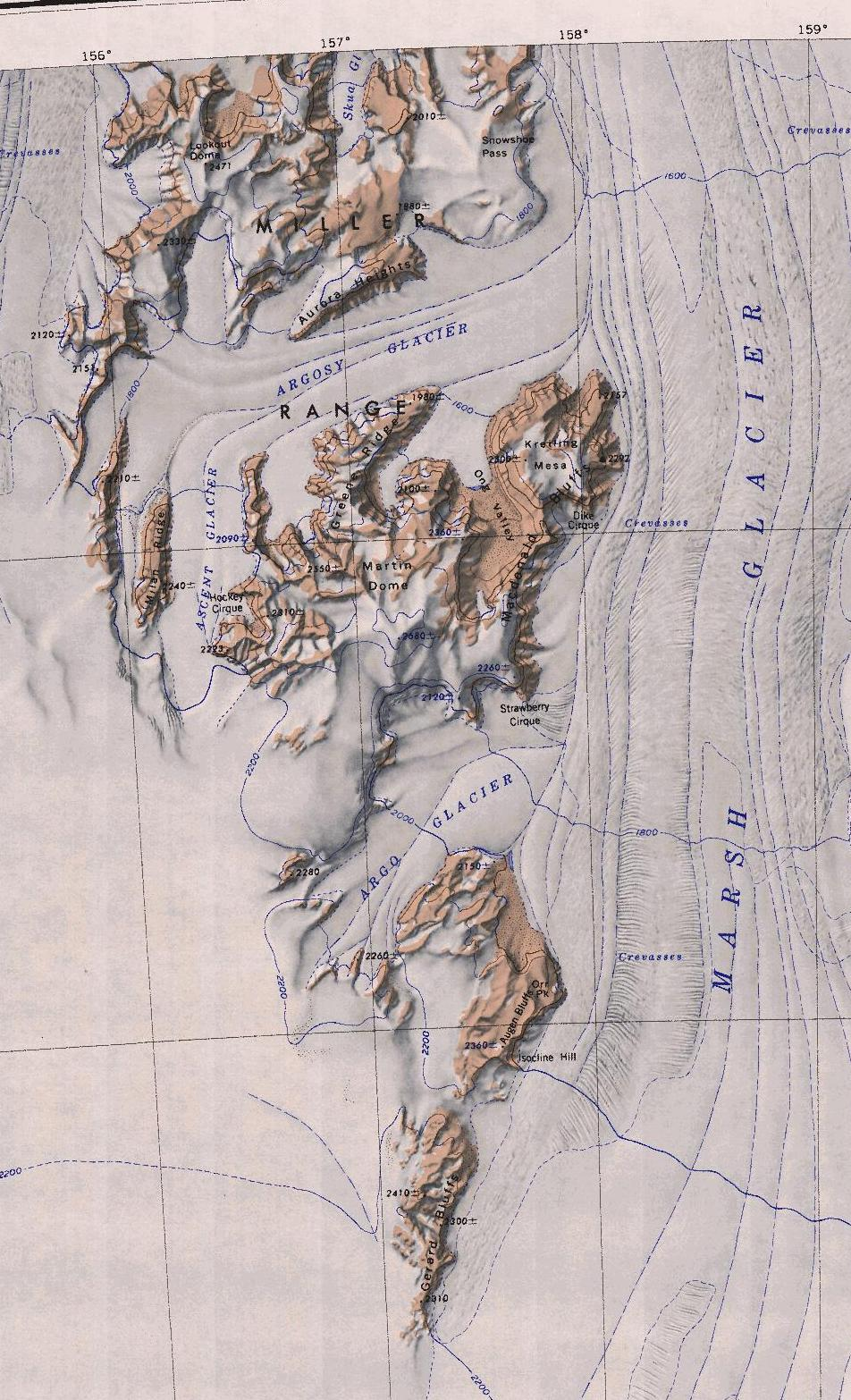
Maps of the Miller Range

== Name ==
The range is named for J.H. "Bob", now Sir Joseph Holmes Miller, a member of the New Zealand party of the Commonwealth Trans-Antarctic Expedition (1958) who, with G.W. Marsh, mapped this area.

== Location ==
The Miller Range is in the Transantarctic Mountains to the east of the Ross Ice Shelf. It runs from north to south, and is about 80 kilometres (50 mi) long and up to 30 kilometres (19 mi) wide. The maximum elevation above the ice sheet is about 1,700 metres (5,600 ft). There are signs of glaciation on the highest points of the range.

The Miller Range is separated by about 20 kilometres (12 mi) from the adjacent ranges of the Transantarctic Mountains by the Nimrod and Marsh glaciers. The Marsh Glacier to the east and Nimrod Glacier to the west both flow north and converge just north of the range. The Queen Elizabeth Range is east of the Miller Range, on the other side of Marsh Glacier. The Cobham Range is to the northeast and the Geologists Range to the northwest, both on the other side of the Nimrod Glacier.

== Geology ==
The Miller Range was part of the Mawson Continent. There is evidence that suggests that the Miller Range terrain was accreted to the Gawler–Adélie Craton during the 1730–1690 Ma Kimban–Nimrod Orogeny, with a suture zone that may be at or near the location of the Nimrod Group.

The range is in the Beardmore-Nimrod Glacier area, which has a basement complex of igneous, metamorphic and sedimentary rocks. This is unconformably overlain by a thick sequence of sedimentary rocks, mostly from the Devonian to Triassic and of continental origin. The Miller Range differs from its neighbors in being composed only of the basement complex, which holds regional metamorphic rocks of the Nimrod Group, with Hope Granite intrusions. Metamorphic rocks of the Nimrod Group include mica schists, metaquartzites, banded gneisses, augen gneisses and marbles, all mostly derived from sedimentary sources, and amphibolites derived from basaltic rocks.

== Glaciers ==
The Marsh Glacier lies to the east and Nimrod Glacier to the west, both of which flow north and converge just north of the range. Argo Glacier, which flows east into Marsh Glacier, divides the southern part of the range from the central part. Argosy Glacier, fed from the south by Ascent Glacier, also flows east into Marsh Glacier, and divides the central part of the range from the northern part. Skua Glacier and Astro Glacier flow northeast through the northern portion of the range into Marsh Glacier.

== Cirques ==
=== Dike Cirque ===
83°14′S 157°57′E. A semi-circular glacial cirque 1 mile (1.6 km) wide in the Miller Range. It is carved into Macdonald Bluffs at the southeast base of Kreiling Mesa. So named by the Ohio State University Geological Party of 1967–68, because the granite cliffs surrounding the cirque are cut by numerous black dikes.

=== Hockey Cirque ===
83°17′S 156°30′E. A glacial cirque 0.5 miles (0.80 km) wide along the east wall of Ascent Glacier in the Miller Range. It was named by the Ohio State University Geological Party of 1967–68 because the cirque was the scene of a game of ice hockey.

=== Strawberry Cirque ===
83°20′S 157°36′E. A semi-circular glacial cirque, 1 mile (1.6 km) wide, at the south end of Macdonald Bluffs in Miller Range. It indents the cliff, at the north side of the terminus of Argo Glacier where the latter enters Marsh Glacier. So named by the Ohio State University Geological Party, 1967–68, because the granite cliffs of the cirque have a bright pink to red color in certain lighting.

== Southern section ==
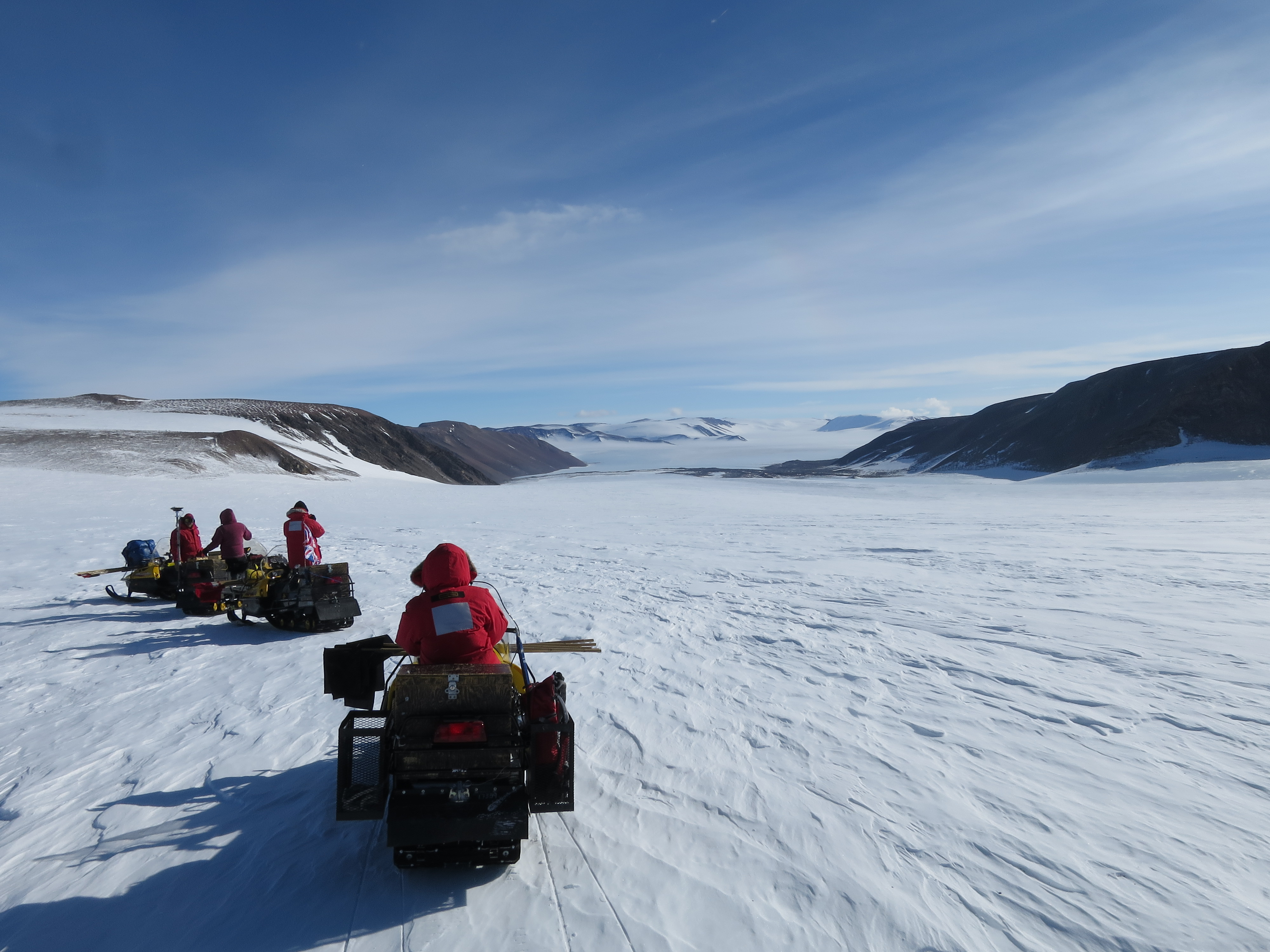
Aboard snow machines, the team traverses a pass toward the blue ice field in the distance.

The southern section is to the south of Argo Glacier.

=== Gerard Bluffs ===
83°37′S 157°15′E. Prominent ice-free bluffs marking the southern extremity of the Miller Range. Mapped in December 1957, and named by the New Zealand southern party of the CTAE (1956–58) for V. Gerard, IGY scientist at Scott Base in 1957.

=== Augen Bluffs ===
83°30′S 157°40′E. Rock bluffs between Orr Peak and Isocline Hill along the west side of Marsh Glacier, in the Miller Range. So named by the Ohio State University Geological Party, 1967–68, because rocks of the locality include augengneiss.

=== Isocline Hill ===
83°31′S 157°36′E. A hill in the south part of Augen Bluffs, Miller Range. The hill rises 100–200 metres (330–660 ft) above the west side of Marsh Glacier and is connected to Augen Bluffs by a col 10–20 metres (33–66 ft) lower than the height of the hill. So named by the Ohio State University Geological Party of 1967–68 because an isoclinal fold is well exposed on the side of the hill.

=== Orr Peak ===
83°29′S 157°49′E. A peak in the Miller Range overlooking Marsh Glacier, forming the eastern salient in the bluffs southward of Argo Glacier. Observed in December 1957 by the New Zealand Southern Party of the CTAE (1956–58). Named for H. Orr, IGY scientist at Scott Base in 1957.

== Central section ==
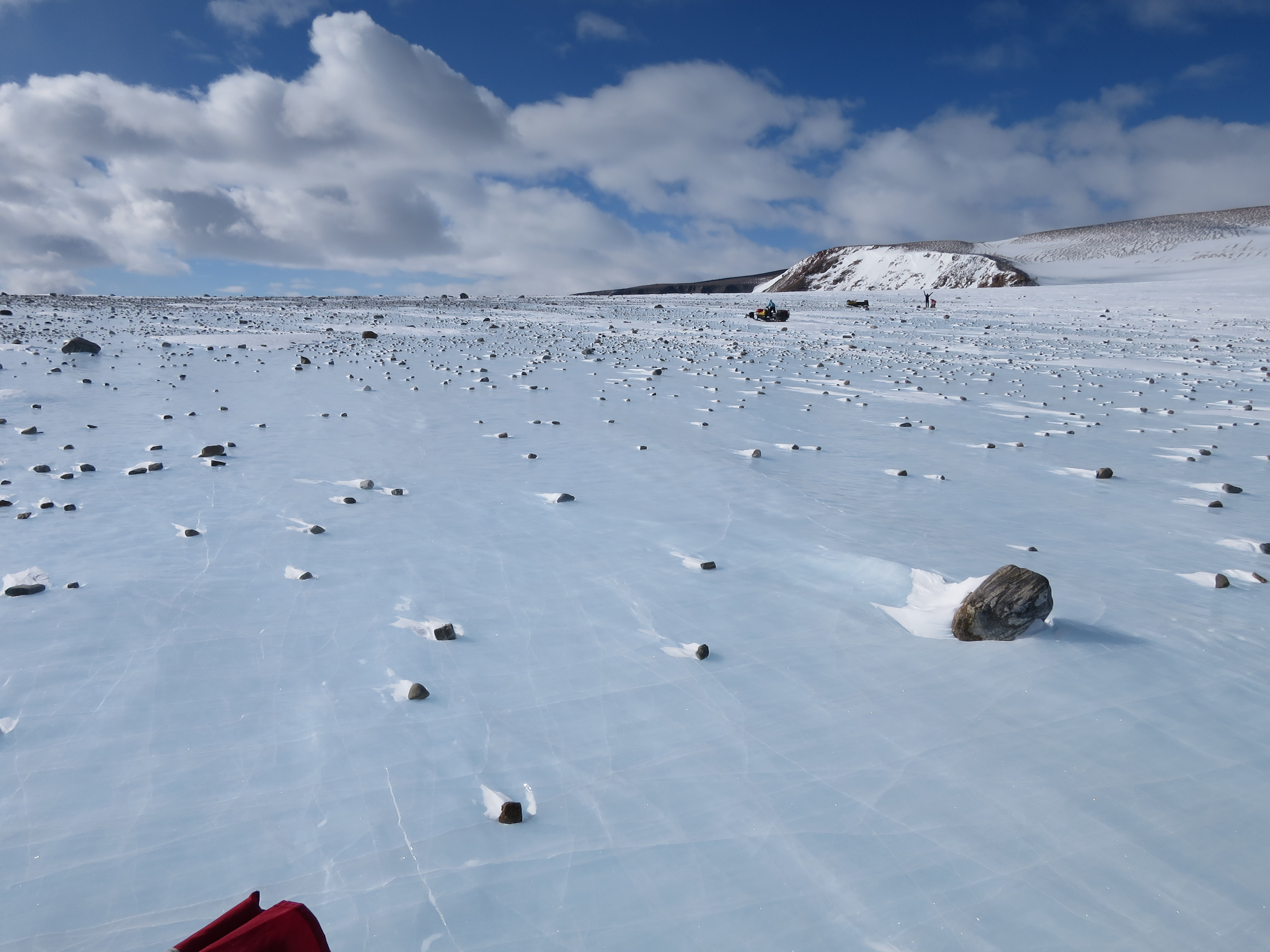
Blue ice field in the Miller Range, near the edge of a moraine.

The Central section is between Argo Glacier and Argosy Glacier.

=== Milan Ridge ===
83°15′S 156°08′E. A mainly ice-free ridge, 5 miles (8.0 km) long, bordering the west side of Ascent Glacier in the Miller Range. Named by US-ACAN for Frederick M. Milan, physiologist at Little America V, 1957.

=== Greene Ridge ===
83°12′S 157°10′E. A partially ice-covered ridge, 5 miles (8.0 km) long, extending northward from Martin Dome to the southern edge of Argosy Glacier in the Miller Range. Named by US-ACAN after Charles R. Greene, Jr., USARP ionospheric scientist at the South Pole Station, 1958.

=== Martin Dome ===
83°18′S 157°12′E. An elevated, snow-covered prominence between Argosy Glacier and Argo Glacier in the Miller Range. Sighted in December 1957 by the New Zealand Southern Party of the CTAE. Named for L. Martin, leader at Scott Base in 1958. Not: Martins Dome.

=== Ong Valley ===
83°14′S 157°37′E. A mainly ice-free valley 5 miles (8.0 km) long, just west of Kreiling Mesa in the Miller Range. Named by US-AC AN for John S. Ong, USARP traverse engineer on the South Pole Traverse (1962–63).

=== Macdonald Bluffs ===
83°15′S 157°50′E. Prominent east-facing bluffs between Argosy and Argo Glaciers in the Miller Range, descending to the Marsh Glacier. Mapped by the New Zealand Southern Party of the CTAE (1956–58) and named for W.J.P. Macdonald, IGY scientist at Scott Base in 1957. Not: Macdonald Cliffs.

=== Kreiling Mesa ===
83°13′S 157°54′E. A distinctive, partially ice-covered mesa at the S side of the mouth of Argosy Glacier in the Miller Range. Named by US-ACAN for Lee W. Kreiling, USARP traverse engineer at NAF McMurdo, winter 1961, Ellsworth Land Traverse, 1961–62, and Roosevelt Island, 1962–63.

== Northern Section ==
The Northern section is to the north of Argosy Glacier.

=== Aurora Heights ===
83°07′S 157°05′E. Prominent heights 5 miles (8.0 km) long, bordering the north side of Argosy Glacier. Named by the NZGSAE (1961–62) for the Aurora, the ship of the Ross Sea Party of the British Trans-Antarctic Expedition (1914–1917).

=== Lookout Dome ===
83°03′S 156°27′E. An ice-covered, dome-shaped mountain, 2,470 metres (8,100 ft) high. So named by the NZGSAE (1961–62) because its heights offer an extensive view of Nimrod Glacier and were used as a survey station.

=== Turner Hills ===
82°58′S 156°18′E. A group of hills between Astro Glacier and Nimrod Glacier in the northwest part of the Miller Range. Mapped by the USGS from tellurometer surveys and Navy air photos, 1960–62. Named by US-ACAN for Dr. Mort D. Turner of the National Science Foundation who has been Program Manager for Polar Earth Sciences, Division of Polar Programs, since 1959. Turner studied the geology of the dry valley areas near McMurdo Sound, 1959–60, and in several subsequent seasons served as USARP Representative in Antarctica.

=== Tricorn Peak ===
82°59′S 156°48′E. Snow-covered peak, 2,320 m, on the ridge between Astro Glacier and Skua Glacier. Seen by the northern party of the NZGSAE (1961–62) and so named because of its resemblance to a three-cornered hat.

=== Snowshoe Pass ===
83°03′S 157°36′E. A snow saddle 4 miles (6.4 km) northeast of Aurora Heights, between Argosy and Skua Glaciers. Discovered and named by the northern party of NZGSAE (1961–62), who found the deep soft snow here made snowshoeing the best method of travel.

=== Rust Bluff ===
82°56′S 157°42′E. A small bluff or promontory on the east side of Miller Range, overlooking Marsh Glacier 5 miles (8.0 km) south of Corner Nunatak. Named by US-ACAN for Izak C. Rust, professor of geology, University of Port Elizabeth, South Africa. Rust was international exchange scientist with the Ohio State University Geological Expedition, 1969–70, and with John Gunner collected geological samples at this bluff.

=== Corner Nunatak ===
82°52′S 157°39′E. A nunatak at the extreme northeast corner of the Miller Range, between Nimrod Glacier and Marsh Glacier. Named by the northern party of the NZGSAE (1961–62). Not: Corner Peak.

== Sources ==
- Alberts, Fred G., ed. (1995), Geographic Names of the Antarctic (PDF) (2 ed.), United States Board on Geographic Names This article incorporates public domain material from websites or documents of the United States Board on Geographic Names.
- Gunner, John D. (1969), Petrography of Metamomorphic Rocks from the Miller Range, Antarctica (PDF), Institute of Polar Studies
- Mount Rabot, USGS United States Geologic Survey, 1960
- Payne, Justin L.; Hand, Martin; Barovich, Karin M.; Reid, Anthony; Evans, David A. D. (2009), "Correlations and reconstruction models for the 2500–1500 Ma evolution of the Mawson Continent", Special Publications, vol. 323, no. 1, Geological Society, London, pp. 319–355, Bibcode:2009GSLSP.323..319P, doi:10.1144/SP323.16
