= Kon-Tiki Nunatak =

Raft-like nunatak In Antarctica

Kon-Tiki Nunatak (82°33′S 159°52′E) is a raft-like nunatak, 1,300 metres (4,300 ft) high, surmounting the Cooper Icefalls in the center of Nimrod Glacier, Antarctica. It was first seen by the northern party of the New Zealand Geological Survey Antarctic Expedition (1961–62) and named after the raft Kon-Tiki which was sailed across the Pacific Ocean from East to West in 1947 by the Norwegian explorer Thor Heyerdahl.
