= Cooper Snowfield =

Antarctic snowfield

- Snow field
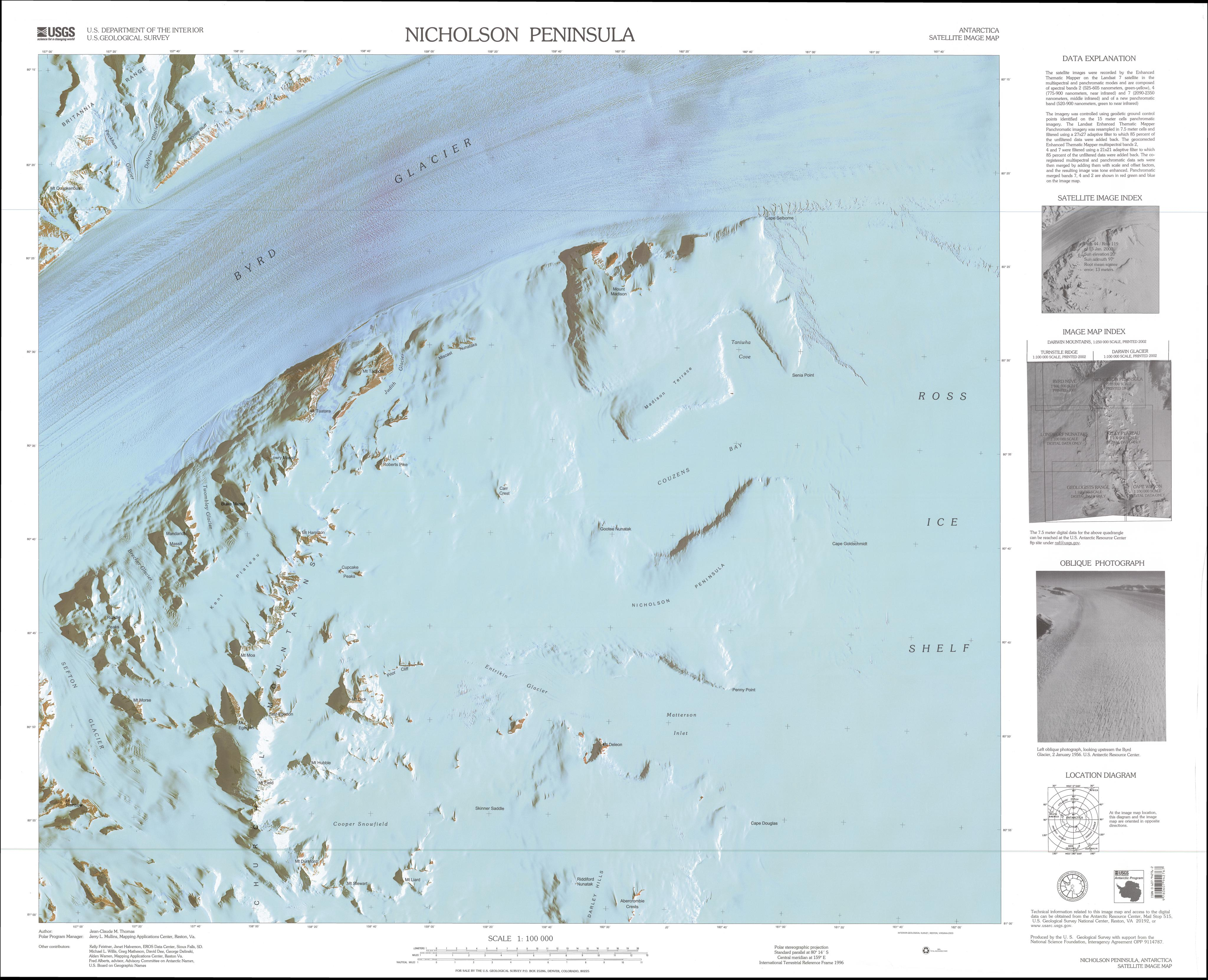
- USGS Satellite Image. Cooper Snowfield in the south, towards the west

- Location within Antarctica
- Coordinates: 80°56′S 158°40′E

Cooper Snowfield (80°56′S 158°40′E) is a snowfield with an area of about 25 square miles (65 km^{2}) in the Churchill Mountains of Antarctica.

== Location ==
The snowfield rises to over 1,200 metres (3,900 ft) and is nearly encircled by ridges connecting Mount Field, Mount Durnford, and Mount Liard. (Note: The USGS entry for Cooper Snowfield includes "Mount Bevin" in the list of surrounding entries. There is a Mount Bevin in the Admiralty Mountains, but none on the maps of the Cooper Snowfield surroundings.) It was named after Alan K. Cooper, a marine geophysicist with the United States Geological Survey, Menlo Park, California, who was involved in drilling and seismic studies of the Antarctic continental margin for deriving paleoenvironments and ice sheet history, 1984–2002.

== Surrounding features ==
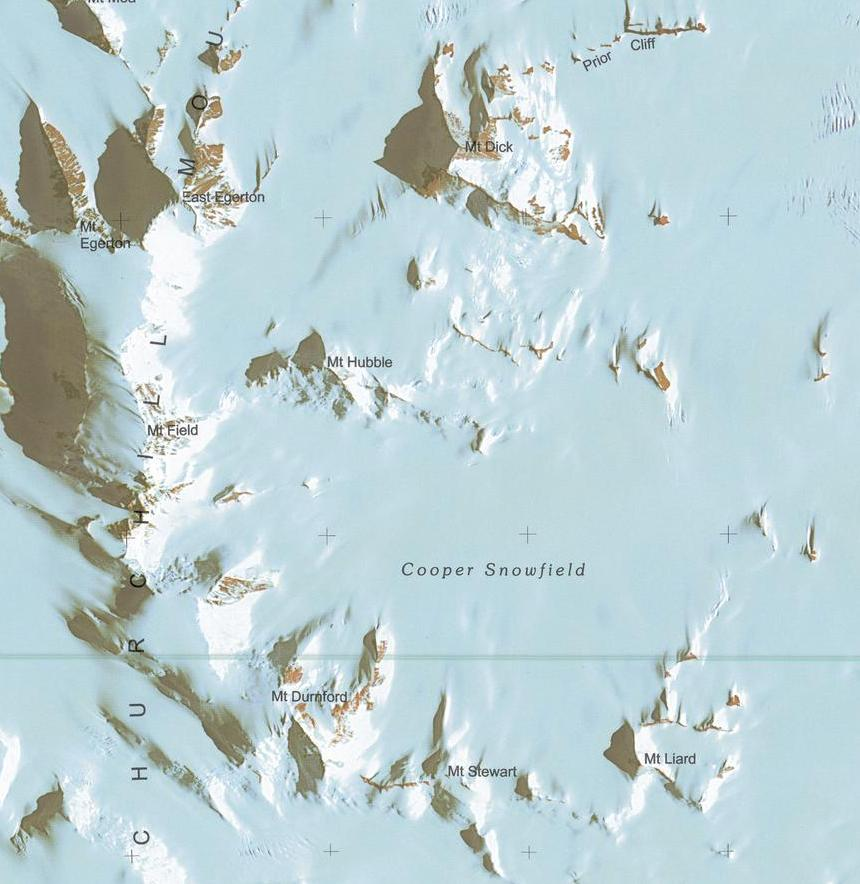
Satellite image map of the snowfield and surroundings

The snowfield is bordered by the Skinner Saddle to the east. Surrounding mountains clockwise from the southeast are Mount Liard, Mount Stewart, Mount Durnford, Mount Field, Mount Hubble.

=== Mount Liard ===
80°58′S 158°51′E. A peak 6 nautical miles (11 km) east of Mount Durnford. It rises to 1,770 metres (5,800 ft) on the ridge south of Cooper Snowfield. The peak was named by the Advisory Committee on Antarctic Names after Theodore J. Liard, Jr. (1918–2002), a geographer with the Department of Interior and the Department of Defense in toponymic research for the U.S. Board on Geographic Names, 1949–80. Liard was Chief of the Geographic Names Division at the Defense Mapping Agency, 1969–80.

=== Mount Stewart ===
80°59′S 158°32′E. A mountain rising to 1,900 metres (6,200 ft), located mid way between Mount Durnford and Mount Liard. Named in honor of Ian Stewart, a retired diplomat, who was also the Whaling Commissioner for 12 years before John Scott and Jim McLay, setting the groundwork in place.

=== Mount Durnford ===
80°58′S 158°15′E. A mountain, 2,715 metres (8,907 ft) high, standing 5 miles (8.0 km) southeast of Mount Field. Discovered and named "Durnford Bluff by the BrNAE (1901-04), for Admiral Sir John Durnford, a Junior Naval Lord who was of assistance to the expedition. The NZGSAE (1960-61) remapped the feature and amended the name to Mount Durnford. Not: Durnford Bluff.

=== Mount Field ===
80°53′S 158°02′E. A mountain, 3,010 metres (9,880 ft) high, standing 3 miles (4.8 km) south-south-east of Mount Egerton. Discovered and named by the BrNAE, 1901-04, under Scott.

=== Mount Hubble ===
80°52′S 158°19′E A mountain rising to 2,490 metres (8,170 ft) between Mount Field and Mount Dick. It was named after American astronomer Edwin Hubble of the Carnegie Institution of Washington's Mount Wilson Observatory, 1919–53; in 1923 he furnished the first certain evidence that extragalactic nebulae were situated far outside the boundaries of our own galaxy, in fact were independent stellar systems.

== Northern peaks ==
To the north of Mount Field and Mount Hubble are Mount Egerton, East Egerton, Mount Dick and Prior Cliff

=== Mount Egerton ===
80°50′S 157°55′E. A mountain, 2,830 metres (9,280 ft) high, rising 3 miles (4.8 km) north-north-west of Mount Field. Discovered by the BrNAE (1901-04) and named for Admiral Sir George Le Clerc Egerton, a member of the Arctic Expedition of 1875-76, one of Scott's advisors for this expedition.

=== East Egerton ===
80°50′S 158°06′E A prominent peak, 2,815 metres (9,236 ft) high, rising 2 miles (3.2 km) east of Mount Egerton. Mapped by the NZGSAE (1960-61) and named in association with Mount Egerton.

=== Mount Dick ===
80°49′S 159°32′E. A prominent peak, 2,410 metres (7,910 ft) high, standing 6 miles (9.7 km) east of Mount Egerton. Named by the NZGSAE (1960-61) for R.G. Dick, Surveyor General of New Zealand.

=== Prior Cliff ===
80°47′S 158°50′E. A cliff between 1,000 and 1,200 metres (3,300 and 3,900 ft) extending east north east from Mount Dick. Named in honor of Stuart Prior, a senior public servant with the Ministry of Foreign Affairs and Trade with previous involvement in Antarctic Treaty administration, who led New Zealand's Antarctic Policy Unit for several years and has actively worked against illegal sub-Antarctic fishing.

== Sources ==
- Alberts, Fred G., ed. (1995), Geographic Names of the Antarctic (PDF) (2 ed.), United States Board on Geographic Names This article incorporates public domain material from websites or documents of the United States Board on Geographic Names.
- "Cooper Snowfield", Geographic Names Information System, United States Geological Survey, United States Department of the Interior
- "Hubble, Mount", Geographic Names Information System, United States Geological Survey, United States Department of the Interior
- "Mount Liard", Geographic Names Information System, United States Geological Survey, United States Department of the Interior
- Nicholson Peninsula, USGS
- "Prior Cliff", Geographic Names Information System, United States Geological Survey, United States Department of the Interior
