= Tellurometer =

Microwave electronic distance measurement equipment

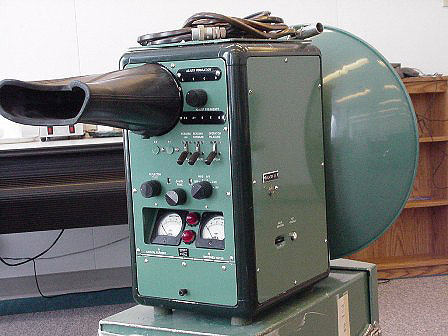
Tellurometer model M/RA-1

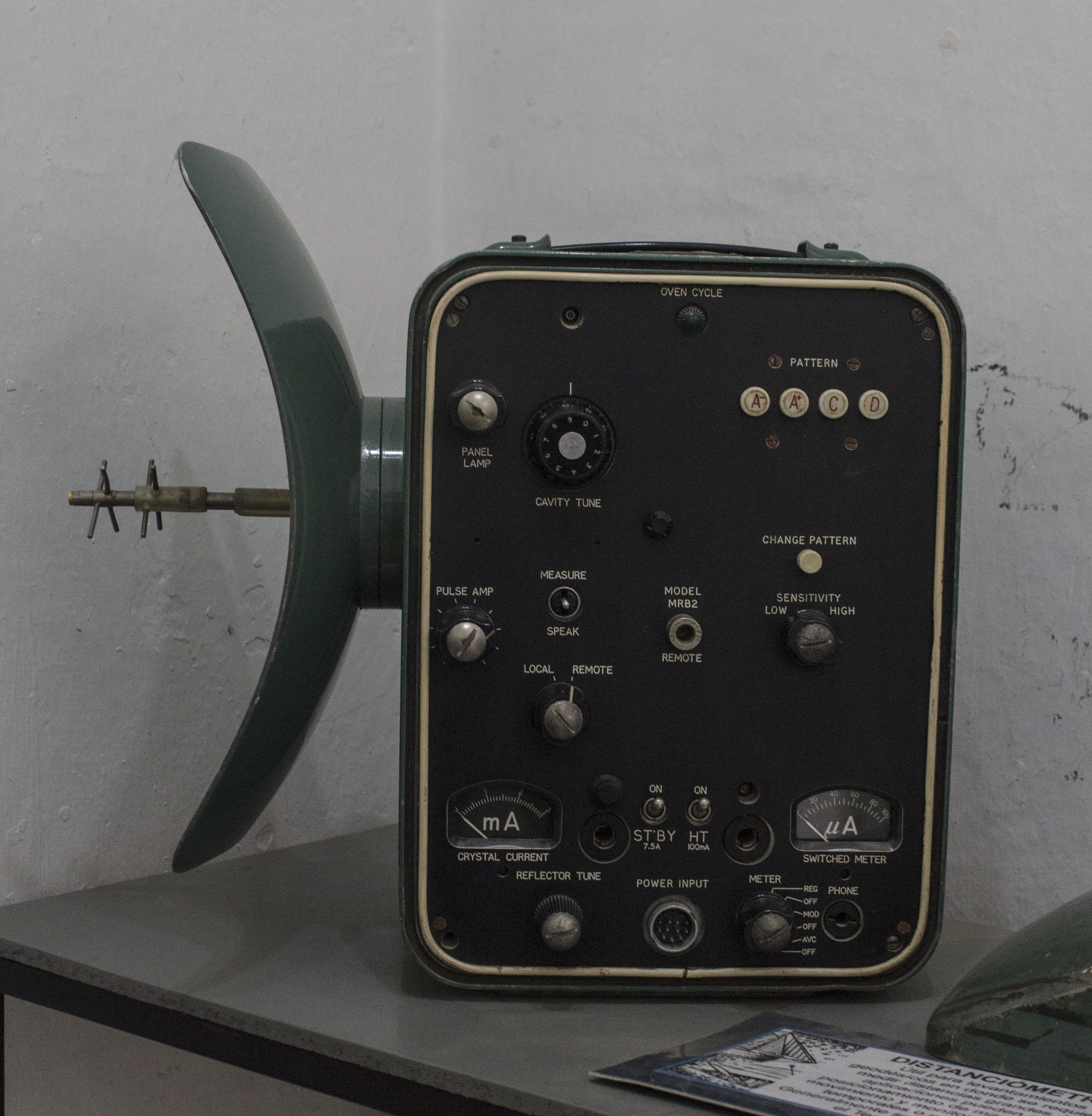
Tellurometer model MRB2

The tellurometer was the first successful microwave electronic distance measurement equipment. The name derives from the Latin tellus, meaning Earth.

== History ==
The original tellurometer, known as the Micro-Distancer MRA 1, was introduced in 1957. It was invented by Trevor Wadley of the Telecommunications Research Laboratory of the South African Council for Scientific and Industrial Research (CSIR). He was also responsible for the Wadley loop receiver, which allowed precision tuning over wide bands, a task that had previously required switching out multiple crystal oscillators.

== Principle ==
The tellurometer emits a microwave-frequency radio wave. The remote station carries a transponder that reradiates the incoming wave in a similar wave of more complex modulation. The resulting phase shift is a measure of the two-way distance travelled. The results appear on a cathode ray tube with circular sweep.

== Application ==
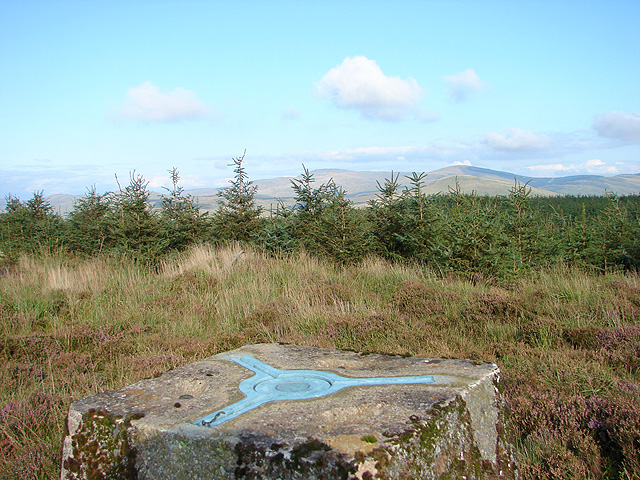
Typical distance measurements were between mountain tops

The tellurometer design yields high accuracy distance measurements over geodetic distances, but it is also useful for second order survey work, especially in areas where the terrain is rough and/or the temperatures extreme. Examples of remote locations mapped using Tellurometer surveys are Adams Bluff, Churchill Mountains, Cook Mountains, Jacobsen Glacier, Mount Albright, Mount Predoehl, Mount Summerson, Sherwin Peak and Vogt Peak.

The instrument penetrates haze and mist in daylight or darkness and has a normal range of 30–50 km but can extend up to 70 km.

The MRB2 or Hydrodist was a marine version that was used in coastal hydrographic surveys and calibrating ships using other survey navigation systems.

They were used by the Army of the Republic of Vietnam in the late 1960s.

== Commercial exploitation ==
Plessey, the British electronics company, formed a new subsidiary known as Tellurometer (Pty) Limited in the 1960s to manufacture the product and to develop and sell derivatives. The company subsequently introduced numerical displays, solid state transmitters, integrated circuits and eventually microprocessors for the product.

== Gallery ==
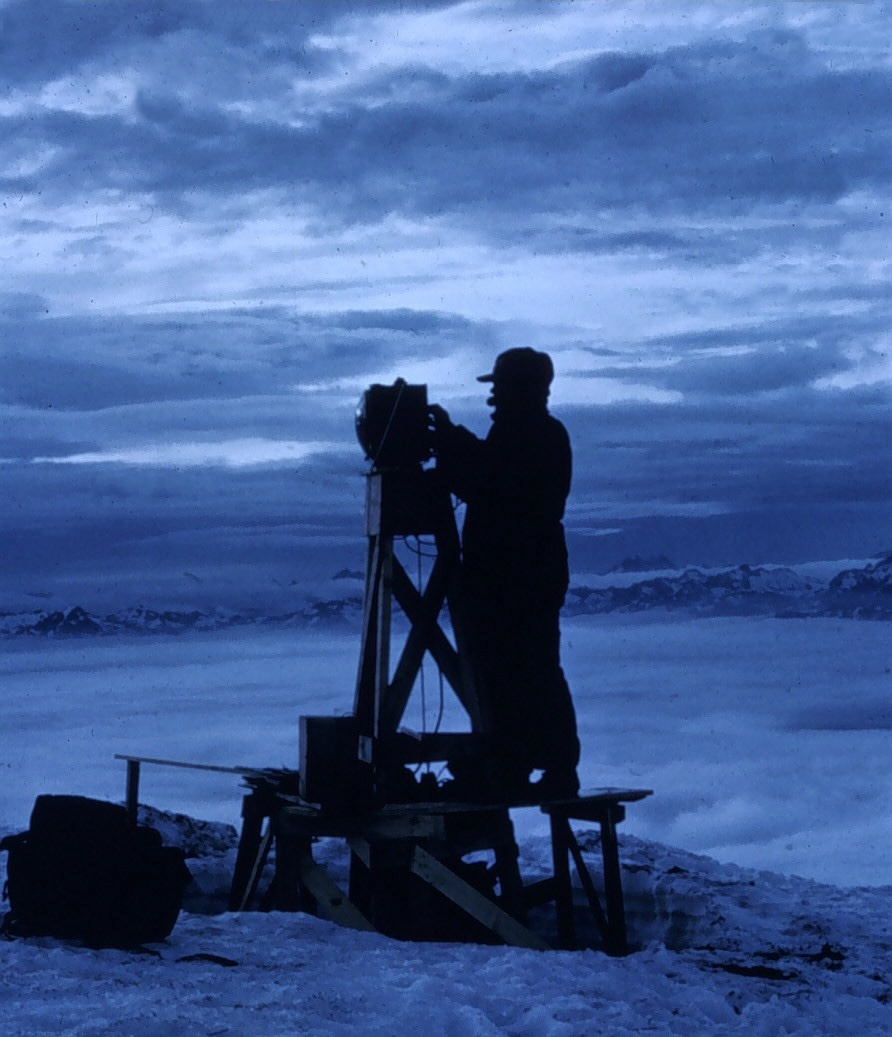
Tellurometer being set up on a mountaintop in Alaska by the US Geodetic Survey

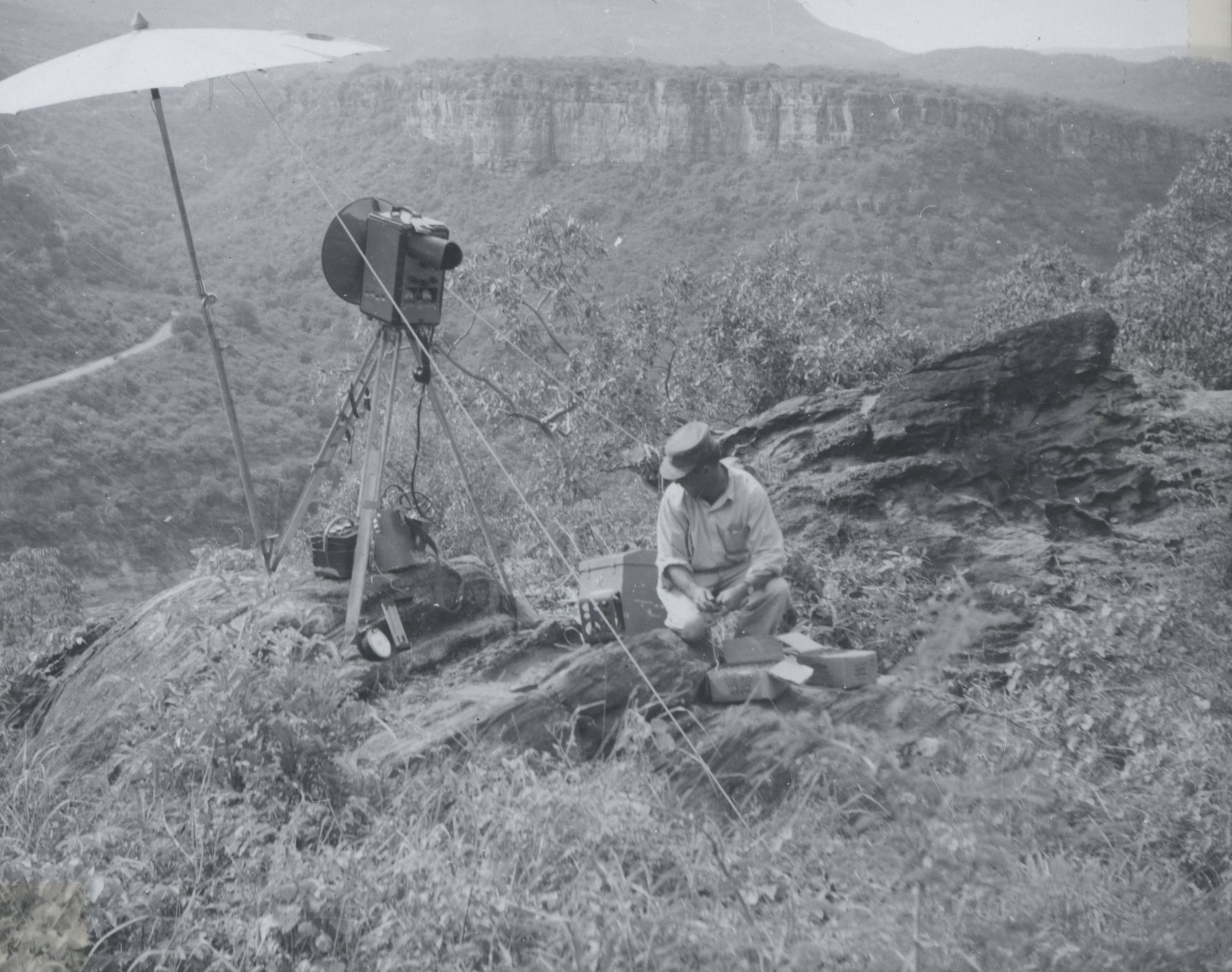
Tellurometer being set up by the US National Geodetic Survey in Ethiopia

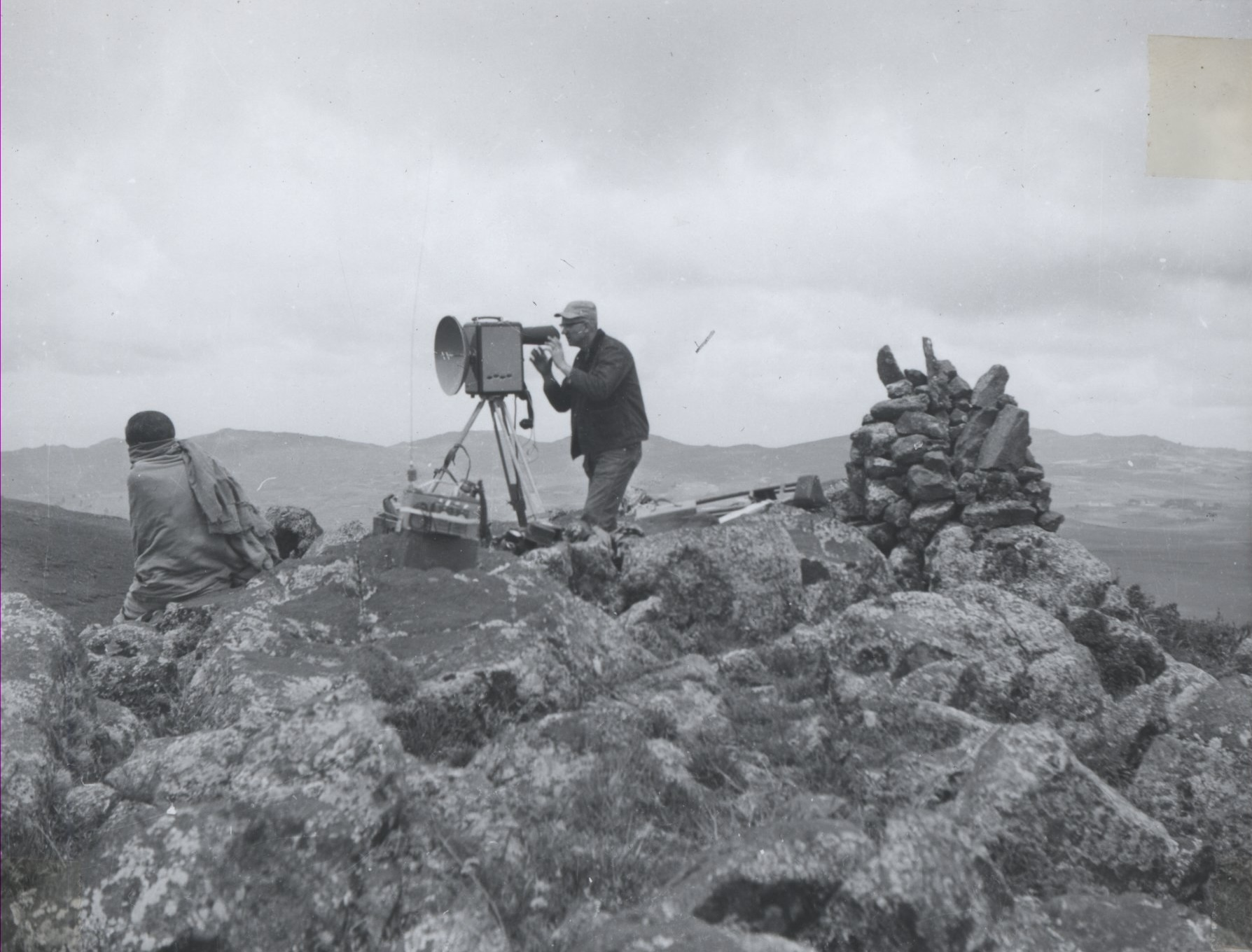
Another tellurometer being set up in Ethiopia

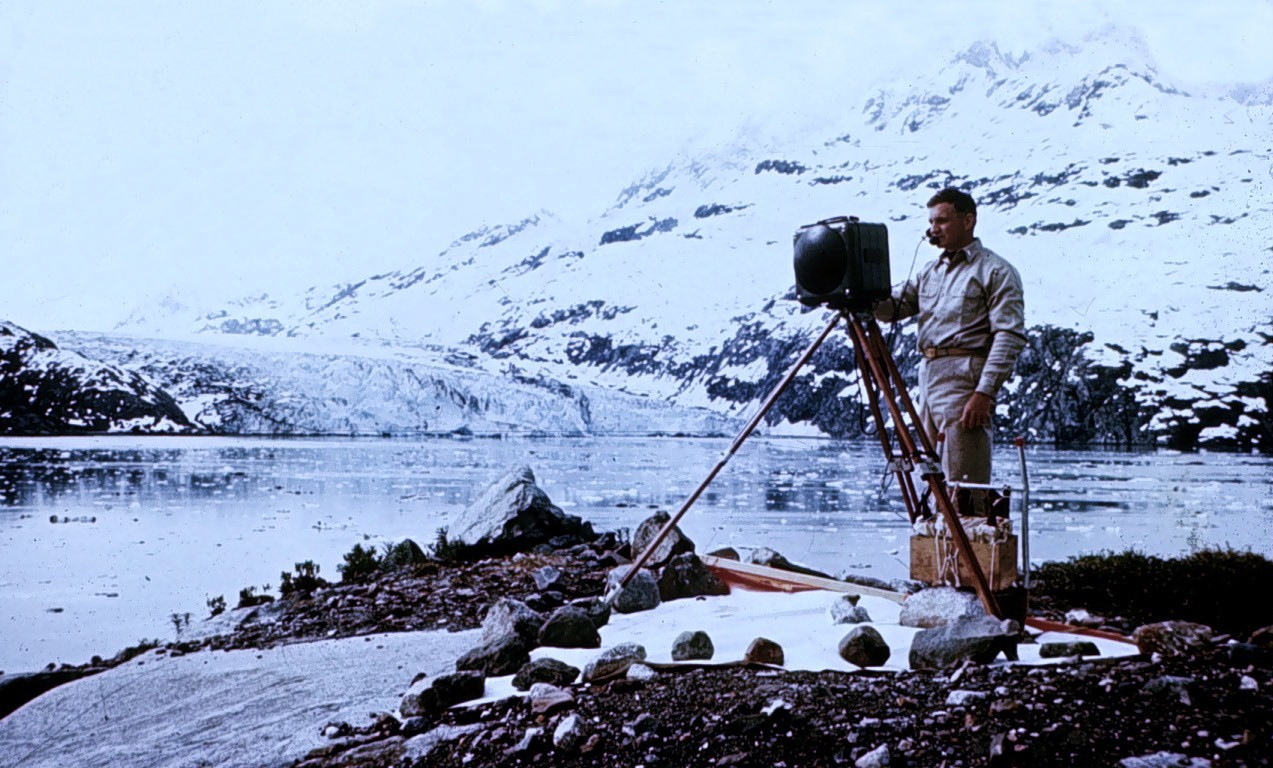
Another tellurometer from the US National Geodetic Survey at Columbia Glacier

== See also ==
- Geodimeter
- Laser rangefinder
- Microwave rangefinder
