= Algie's Romance =

1918 film

- Directed by: Leonard Doogood
- Written by: Leonard Doogood; Keith Yelland
- Produced by: Leonard Doogood
- Starring: Leonard Doogood; Boyd Irwin
- Production company: South Australian Feature Film Company
- Release dates: 20 April 1918 (preview); 1 September 1918 (Sydney)
- Running time: 3,500 feet
- Country: Australia
- Languages: Silent film English intertitles

Algie's Romance is a 1918 Australian silent film. It is a comedy starring Charlie Chaplin impersonator Leonard Doogood as an Englishman who arrives in Australia and has adventures.

== Plot ==
An Englishman, Algie, arrives in Australia and stays with friends in the country. Twin sisters both fall in love with him.Algie finds himself subjected to various practical jokes, but ultimately he demonstrates his courage and ability. Through showcasing his prowess as a crack shot, he not only overcomes the jests but also wins a wife in the process..

== Cast ==
- Leonard Doogood as Algie
- Boyd Irwin
- May Henry
- June Henry

== Production ==
Doogood was a Charlie Chaplin impersonator who had previously made a one-reel short film in South Australia, Charlie's Twin Brother.

The film was shot on a cattle station owned by the Downer family in South Australia, near the Mount Lofty Ranges. Technical facilities were provided by Southern Cross Feature Films.

The film was well received and Doogood made plans for a follow-up, Dinkum Oil, based on a novel by Frederick J Mills, but it was never shot.

It is considered a lost film.
