= Laird Plateau =

Laird Plateau (82°0′S 157°0′E) is a high plateau, over 2,400 metres (8,000 ft) above sea level, standing 1 nautical mile (2 km) northwest of Mount Hayter on the north side of the head of Lucy Glacier, Antarctica. It was first seen by the New Zealand Geological Survey Antarctic Expedition (NZGSAE)(1964–65) and was named after Malcolm G. Laird, the leader of this geological party to the area, as was also Cape Laird.
