= Algie (surname) =

Algie is a surname, and may refer to:

- Jessie Algie (1859–1927), Scottish painter
- Matthew Algie (1810–1902), Scottish tea and coffee trader, founder of Matthew Algie
- Ronald Algie (1888–1978), New Zealand lawyer and politician
- Roy Algie (1889–1946), Australian rugby league footballer
- Wallace Lloyd Algie (1891–1918), Canadian Victoria Cross recipient
