= Nimrod Glacier =

Glacier in Antarctica

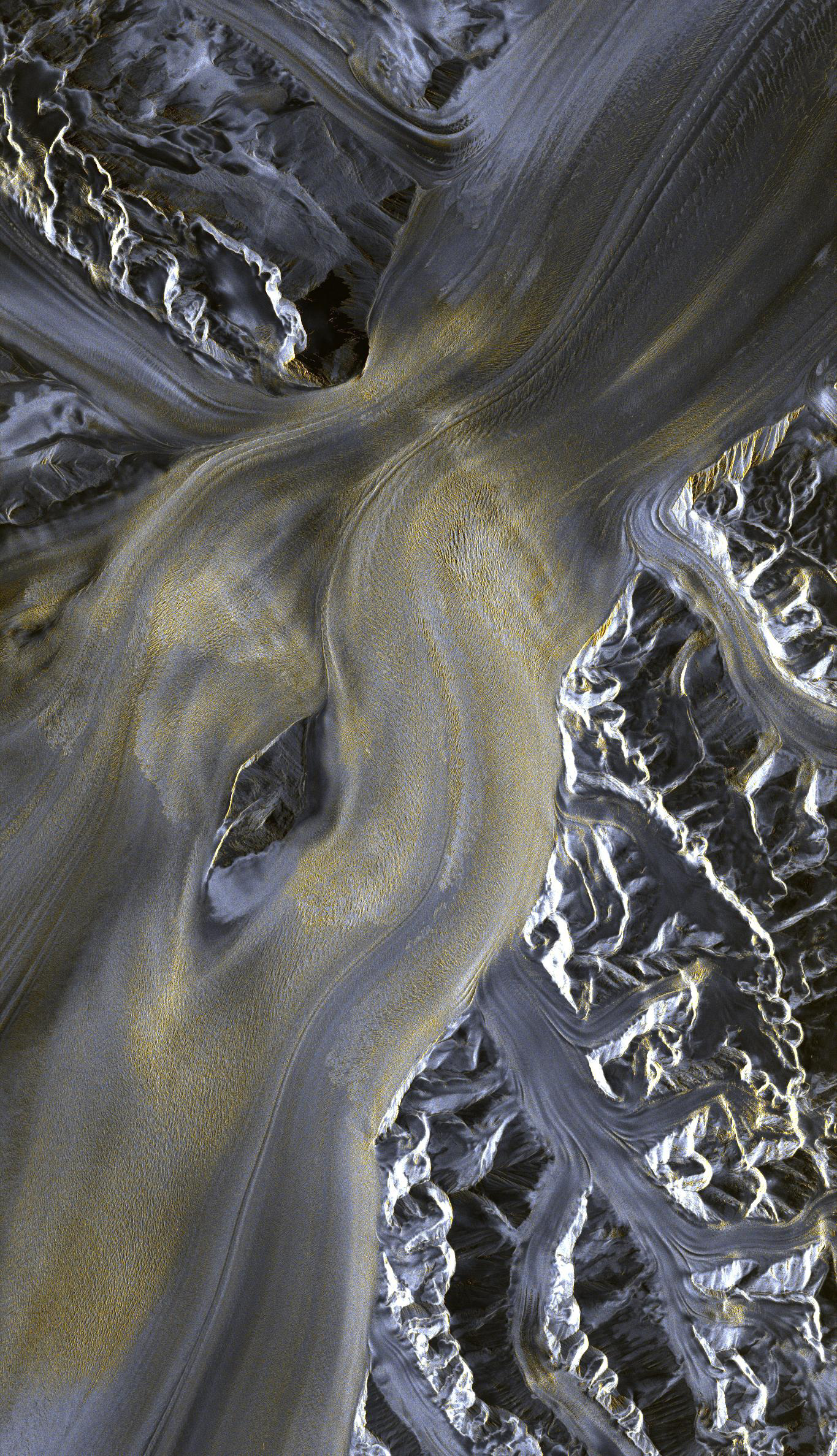
- Satellite image of the Nimrod Glacier flowing round the Kon-Tiki Nunatak.

- Location within Antarctica
- Coordinates: 82°21′S 163°00′E
- Length: 135 kilometres (84 mi)
- Terminus: Ross Ice Shelf

The Nimrod Glacier (82°21′S 163°00′E) is a major glacier about 85 nautical miles (157 km; 98 mi) long, flowing from the polar plateau in a northerly direction through the Transantarctic Mountains into the Ross Ice Shelf, Antarctica.

== Location ==
The Nimrod Glacier flows north between the Geologists and Miller Ranges, then northeasterly between the Churchill Mountains and Queen Elizabeth Range, and finally spills into Shackleton Inlet and the Ross Ice Shelf between Capes Wilson and Lyttelton. It was photographed from the air by USN Operation Highjump, 1946–47. The name, given by US-ACAN, is in association with Shackleton Inlet and is for the Nimrod, the ship of the British Antarctic Expedition (1907–09) under Ernest Shackleton. The mouth of the glacier is southeast of the Starshot Glacier and the Nursery Glacier. It is north of Robb Glacier.

== Icefalls ==
=== Worsley Icefalls ===
82°57′S 155°00′E Icefalls near the head of Nimrod Glacier. Seen by the northern party of the NZGSAE (1961-62) and presumbably named for Frank Worsley, member of the British Trans-Antarctic Expedition, 1914-16, and Shackleton-Rowett Antarctic Expedition, 1921-22.

=== Cooper Icefalls ===
82°31′S 160°00′E. The main icefalls of the Nimrod Glacier, in the vicinity of Kon-Tiki Nunatak. Named by the southern party of the NZGSAE (1960-61) for Christopher Neville Cooper, a member of the expedition, and also a member of the New Zealand Alpine Club Antarctic Expedition, 1959-60.

== Left tributaries ==
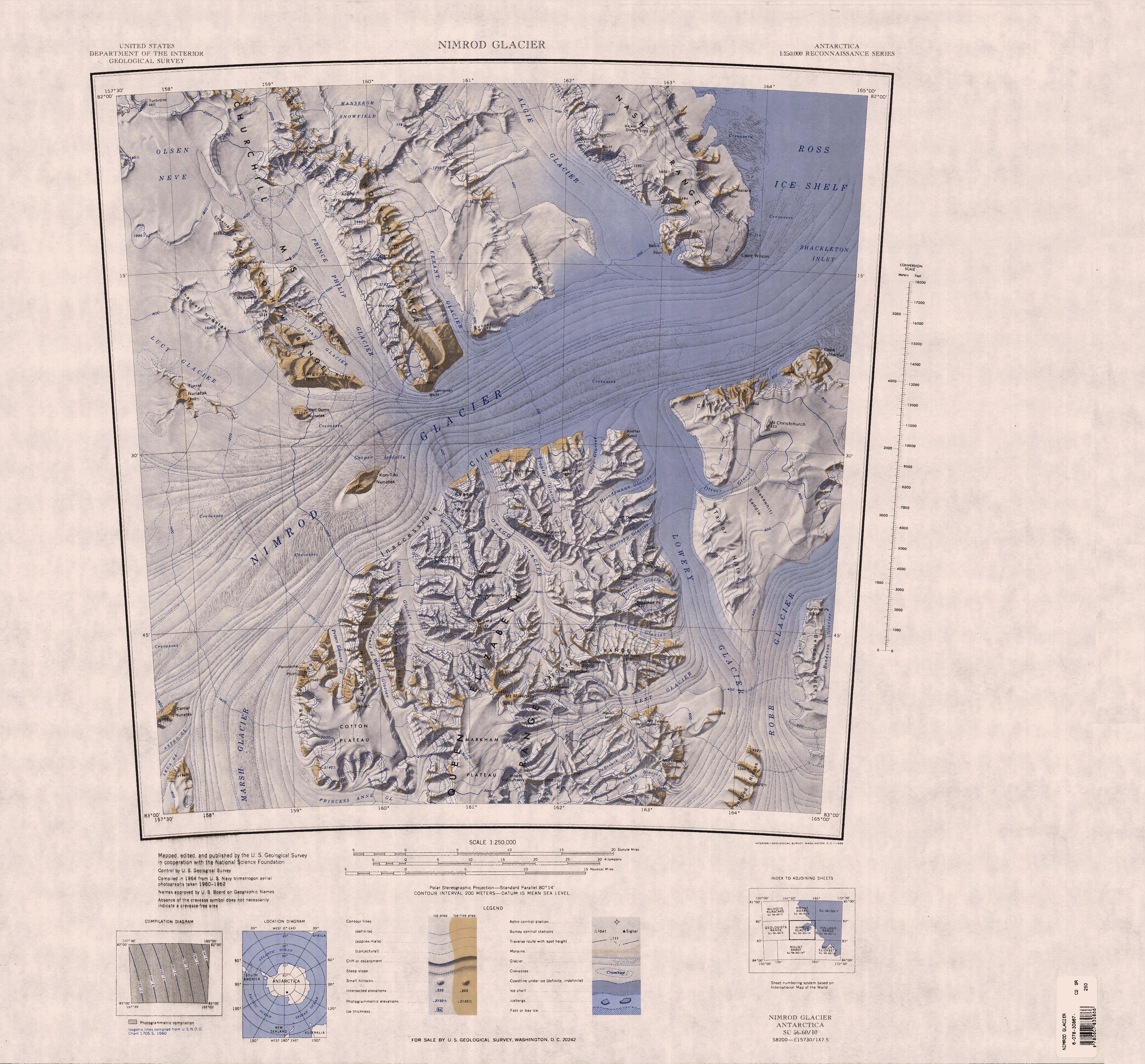
Lower Nimrod Glacier

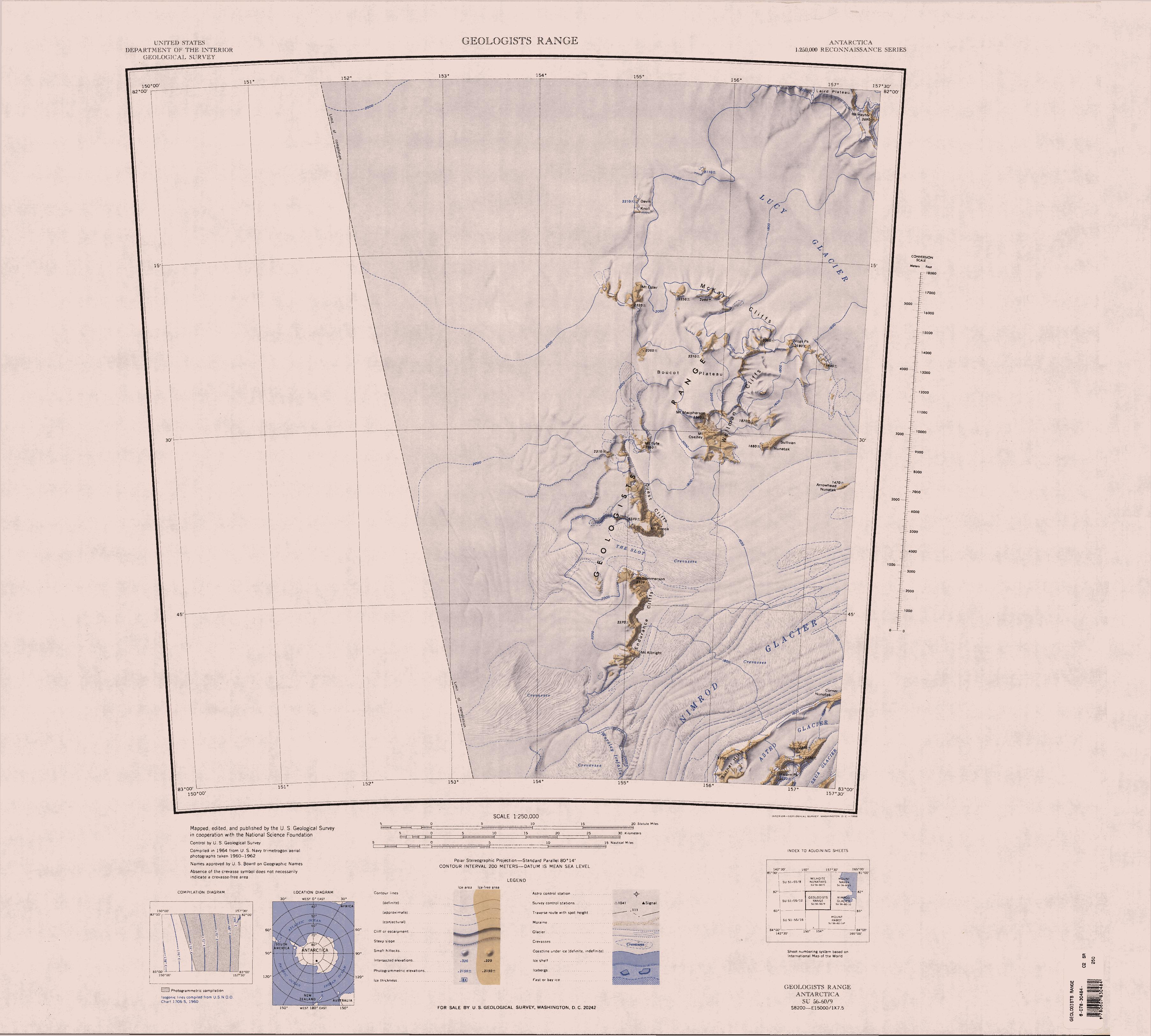
Geologists Range and upper Nimrod Glacier

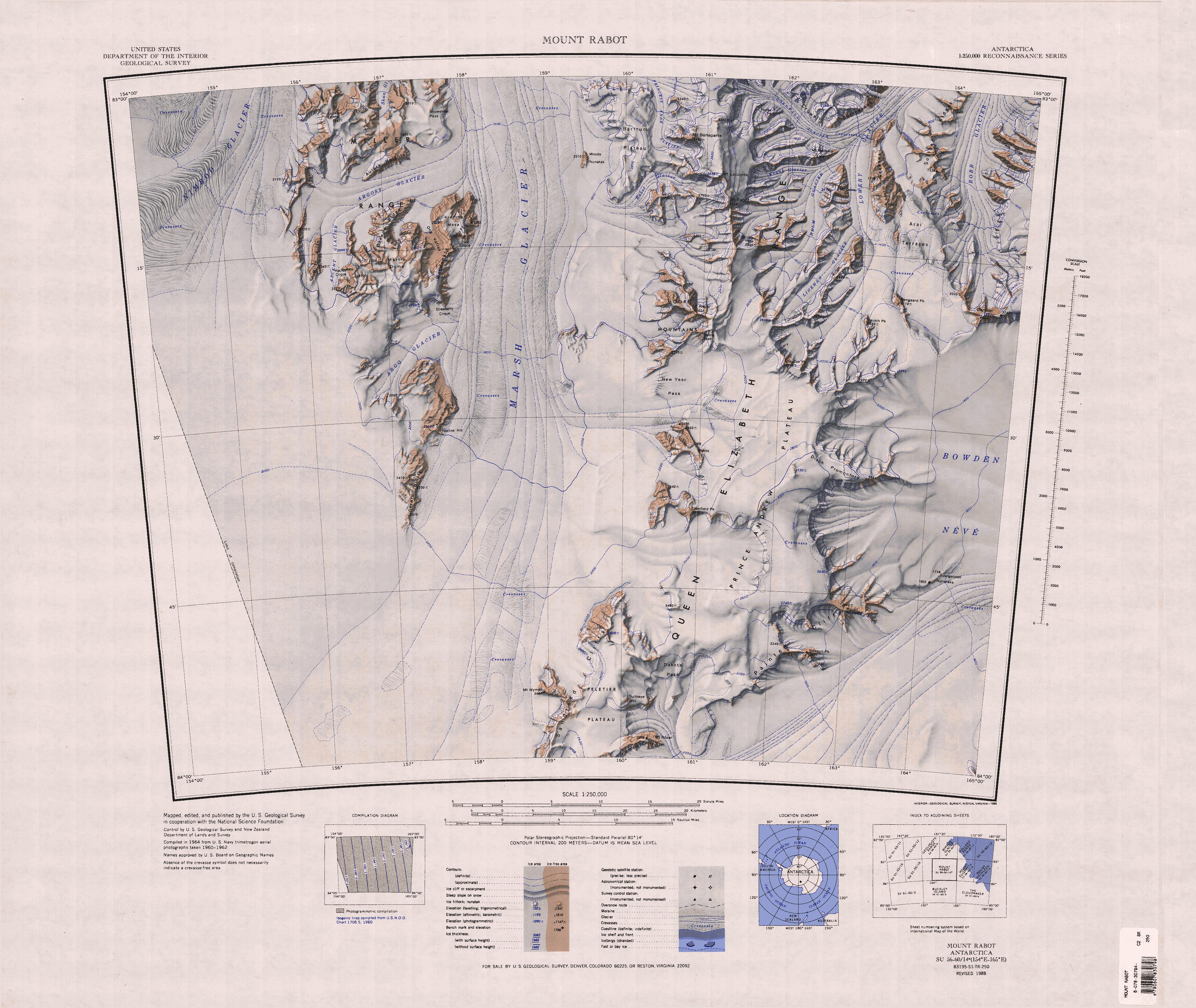
Miller Range and Marsh Glacier

Tributaries from the left (Churchill Mountains) side are, from east to west:

=== Algie Glacier ===
82°08′S 162°05′E. Glacier about 25 miles (40 km) long, flowing southeast into Nimrod Glacier just west of Nash Range. Named by the New Zealand Ross Sea Committee for the Hon. R.M. Algie who, as Minister in Charge of Scientific and Industrial Research, gave his strong support to the New Zealand party of the CTAE, 1956-58.

=== Errant Glacier ===
82°21′S 160°58′E. Glacier, 15 miles (24 km) long, which lies on the east side of Holyoake Range and drains south into Nimrod Glacier. This glacier offered a route to the southern party of the NZGSAE (1960-61) when they journeyed north from Nimrod Glacier in December 1960. Named by them to describe the zigzag route of the party in traveling on the glacier in search for a route north.

=== Prince Philip Glacier ===
82°21′S 159°55′E. Glacier flowing south for about 20 miles (32 km) between Cobham and Holyoake ranges into Nimrod Glacier. Named by the NZ-APC for Prince Philip, Duke of Edinburgh, husband of Queen Elizabeth II.

=== Gray Glacier ===
82°23′S 159°35′E. A glacier in the Cobham Range, 6 miles (9.7 km) long, lying south of Tarakanov Ridge and flowing southeast to merge with Prince Philip Glacier where the two join the Nimrod Glacier. Named by the Holyoake, Cobham, and Queen Elizabeth Ranges party of the NZGSAE (1964-65) for M. Gray, postmaster and assistant radio officer at Scott Base, 1965.

=== The Slot ===
82°40′S 155°05′E. A small swift glacier descending from the polar plateau between Mount Ronca and Mount Summerson in the Geologists Range. Seen by the northern party of the NZGSAE (1961-62) and so named because of its narrowness and crevassed nature.

=== Lucy Glacier ===
82°24′S 158°25′E. A wide glacier which flows southeast from the polar plateau, between Laird Plateau and McKay Cliffs, into Nimrod Glacier. Named for W.R. Lucy, surveyor with 1963-64 Scott Base projects, who wintered over in 1964, and was surveyor with the 1964-65 Geologists Range field party of the NZGSAE.

On December 31, 1993, a ski-equipped Hercules (LC-130) aircraft crashed on Lucy Glacier, near Mount Isbell. The aircraft was retrieving a group from the University of Wisconsin–Milwaukee who had spent six weeks investigating the geology in the mountains between the Byrd Glacier and Nimrod Glacier. The group consisted of Gina Seegers-Szablewski, Greg Gelhar, mountaineer Shaun Norman (New Zealand), and John Isbell.

== Right tributaries ==
Tributaries from the right (Queen Elizabeth Range) side are, from east to west:

=== Lowery Glacier ===
82°35′S 163°15′E. Glacier about 60 miles (97 km) long, which flows north from Prince Andrew Plateau along the east side of Queen Elizabeth Range to enter Nimrod Glacier. Named by the N.Z Geological and Topographical Survey Expedition (1959-60) for J.H. Lowery who, as a member of a field party, suffered injuries when a Sno-cat broke through a crevasse bridge off Cape Selborne in November 1959.

=== Doss Glacier ===
82°30′S 162°21′E. A small glacier just east of Mount Boman, flowing into Nimrod Glacier from the north slopes of the Queen Elizabeth Range. Mapped by the USGS from tellurometer surveys and Navy air photos, 1960-62. Named by US-ACAN for Edgar L. Doss, USARP glaciologist at Roosevelt Island, 1962-63.

=== Tranter Glacier ===
82°32′S 161°45′E. A glacier in the north part of Queen Elizabeth Range, draining into Nimrod Glacier between Mount Chivers and Mount Boman. Mapped by the USGS from tellurometer surveys and Navy air photos, 1960-62. Named by US-ACAN for David L. Tranter, USARP glaciologist at Roosevelt Island, 1962-63.

=== Otago Glacier ===
82°32′S 161°0′E Glacier about 20 miles (32 km) long draining the northeast side of Mount Markham and entering Nimrod Glacier just east of Svaton Peaks. Named by the northern party of the NZGSAE (1961-62) for Otago University, New Zealand.

=== Heilman Glacier ===
82°37′S 160°46′E. A glacier in the north part of Queen Elizabeth Range, flowing northwest from Mount Sandved into Nimrod Glacier. Mapped by the USGS from tellurometer surveys and Navy air photos, 1960-62. Named by US-ACAN for William L. Heilman, USARP glaciologist at Roosevelt Island, 1961-62.

=== Hamilton Glacier ===
82°40′S 160°15′E. A glacier about 12 miles (19 km) long flowing from the northwest slopes of Markham Plateau in the Queen Elizabeth Range into Nimrod Glacier. Named by the northern party of the NZGSAE (1960-61) for W.M. Hamilton, Secretary of the New Zealand Dept. of Scientific and Industrial Research.

=== Marsh Glacier ===
82°52′S 158°30′E. Glacier about 70 miles (110 km) long, flowing north from the polar plateau between the Miller Range and Queen Elizabeth Range into Nimrod Glacier. Seen by a New Zealand party of the CTAE (1956-58) and named for G.W. Marsh, a member of the party.

== See also ==
- List of glaciers in the Antarctic

== Sources ==
- Alberts, Fred G., ed. (1995), Geographic Names of the Antarctic (PDF) (2 ed.), United States Board on Geographic Names This article incorporates public domain material from websites or documents of the United States Board on Geographic Names.
- Holland Range, USGS: United States Geological Survey
- Mount Nares, USGS: United States Geological Survey
- This article incorporates public domain material from websites or documents of the United States Geological Survey.
