= Cobham Range =

Mountain range in Antarctica

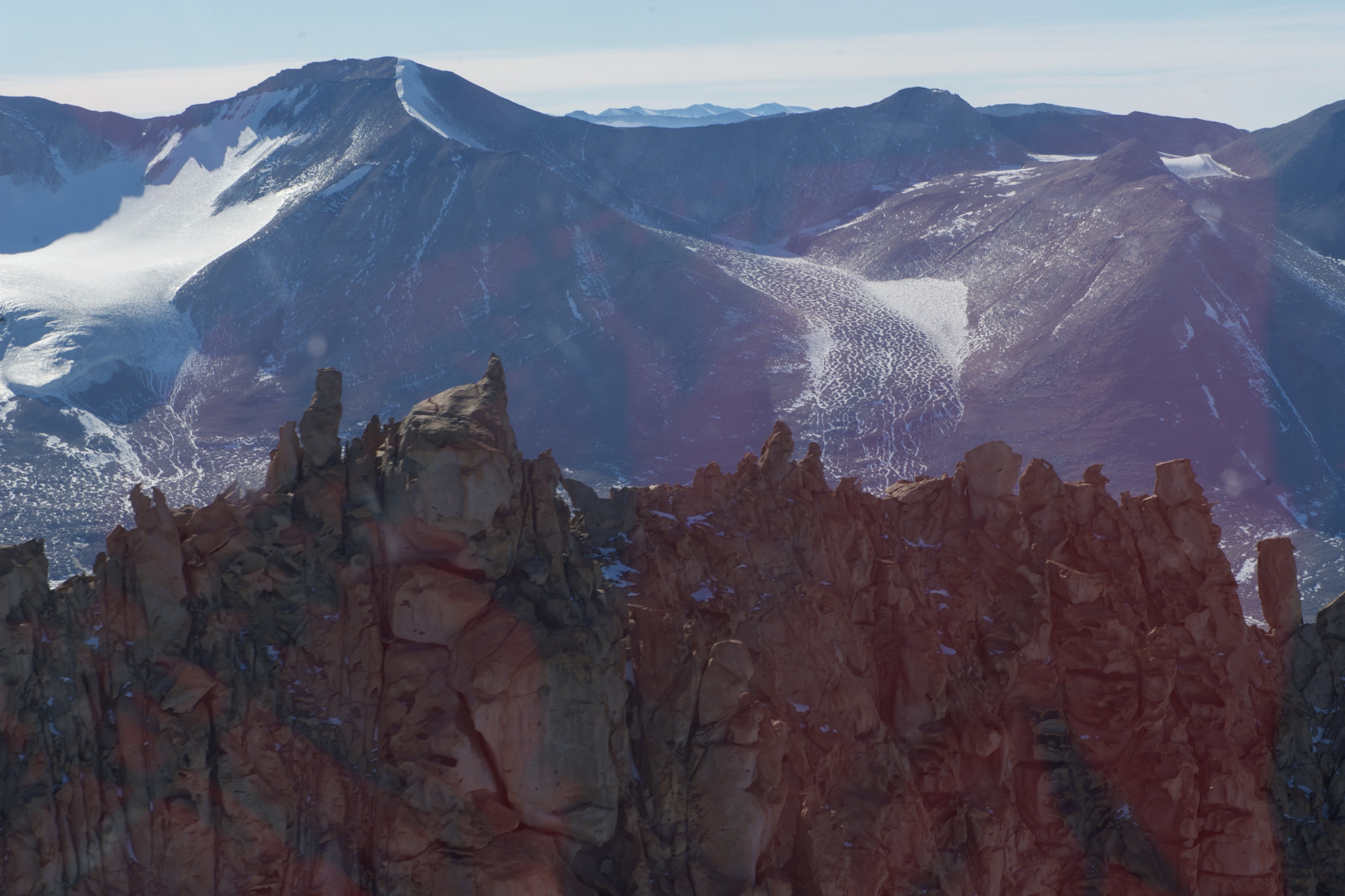
- Gargoyle Ridge (foreground) as seen on November 11, 2016, by U.S. Secretary of State John Kerry

Highest point
- Elevation: 2,335 m (7,661 ft)

Geography
- Location within Antarctica
- Location: Antarctica
- Region: Ross Dependency
- Range coordinates: 82°18′S 159°0′E

The Cobham Range (82°18′S 159°0′E) is a mountain range in the Churchill Mountains of the Ross Dependency, Antarctica. It extends to the north of the Nimrod Glacier.

== Location ==
The Cobham Range trends in a northwest–southeast direction for about 20 nautical miles (40 km) in the southern part of the Churchill Mountains of the Ross Dependency, Antarctica. The Prince Philip Glacier runs south down the east side of the Cobham Range, and the Lucy Glacier runs southeast down the west side. They both feed the Nimrod Glacier, which flows to the northeast past the south end of the range. The Holyoake Range is east of the Cobham Range on the east side of the Prince Philip Glacier. The Queen Elizabeth Range is south of the Cobham Range on the south side of the Nimrod Glacier.

== Early exploration and naming ==
The Cobham Range was mapped by the northern party of the New Zealand Geological Survey Antarctic Expedition (NZGSAE), 1961–62, and named by the New Zealand Antarctic Place-Names Committee for a former Governor-General of New Zealand, Lord Cobham.

== Geology ==
The range gives its name to the "Cobham Formation". This is a sequence of interlayered quartzite, marble and schist of the albite-epidote hornfels facies. It is conformably overlain by greywacke and argillite of the Goldie Formation. The Cobham Formation crops out in the south-west portion of the Cobham Range as a strip about 2–4 kilometres (1.2–2.5 mi) wide extending from west of Mount Kopere south to Gargoyle Ridge.

== Features ==
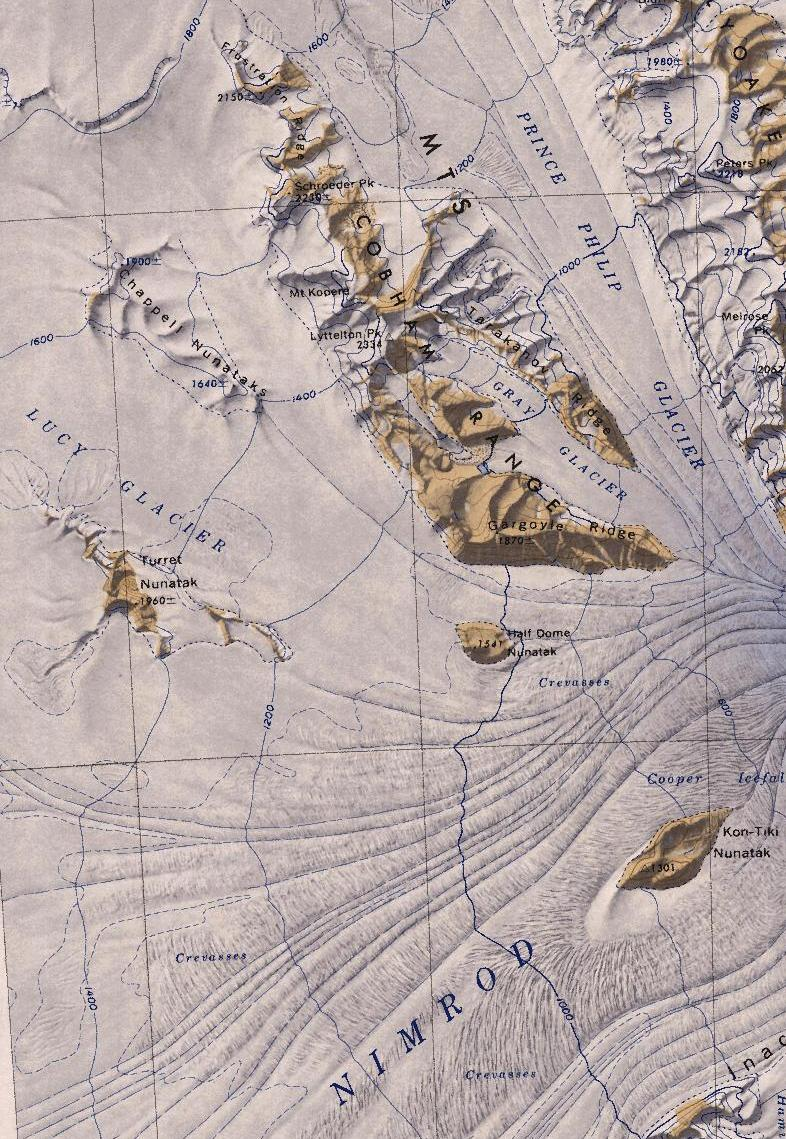
Cobham Range and surroundings

Geographical features from north to south include:

=== Frustration Ridge ===
82°12′S 158°38′E. Ridge forming the north end of the Cobham Range in the Churchill Mountains. So named by the Holyoake, Cobham, and Queen Elizabeth Ranges party of the NZGSAE (1964–65) because although from below it looked a simple climb, great difficulty was experienced in traversing it.

=== Schroeder Peak ===
82°15′S 158°37′E. Peak, 2,230 metres (7,320 ft) high, standing 3 miles (4.8 km) northwest of Mount Kopere in the Cobham Range. Mapped by the USGS from tellurometer surveys and Navy air photos, 1960–62. Named by the Advisory Committee on Antarctic Names (US-ACAN) for James E. Schroeder, United States Antarctic Program (USARP) glaciologist at Little America V, 1959–60.

=== Mount Kopere ===
82°17′S 158°51′E. Peak 1.5 miles (2.4 km) northwest of Lyttelton Peak in the central part of Cobham Range. Named by the Holyoake, Cobham and Queen Elizabeth Ranges party of the NZGSAE (1964–65). Kopere is the Maori word for arrow; the peak's triangular cross section from most directions suggests an arrowhead.

=== Lyttelton Peak ===
82°18′S 158°56′E. The highest peak, 2,335 m, of the Cobham Range. Mapped by the NZGSAE (1961–62) and given the family name of the former Governor-General of New Zealand, Lord Cobham. Not: Lyttleton Peak.

=== Tarakanov Ridge ===
82°19′S 159°24′E. A prominent ridge from the Cobham Range, between the Gray Glacier and Prince Philip Glacier. Mapped by the USGS from tellurometer surveys and Navy air photos, 1960–62. Named by US-ACAN for Gennady Tarakanov, Soviet exchange scientist, meteorologist at McMurdo Station in 1963.

=== Gray Glacier ===
82°23′S 159°35′E. A glacier in the Cobham Range, 6 miles (9.7 km) long, lying south of Tarakanov Ridge and flowing southeast to merge with Prince Philip Glacier where the two join the Nimrod Glacier. Named by the Holyoake, Cobham, and Queen Elizabeth Ranges party of the NZGSAE (1964–65) for M. Gray, postmaster and assistant radio officer at Scott Base, 1965.

=== Gargoyle Ridge ===
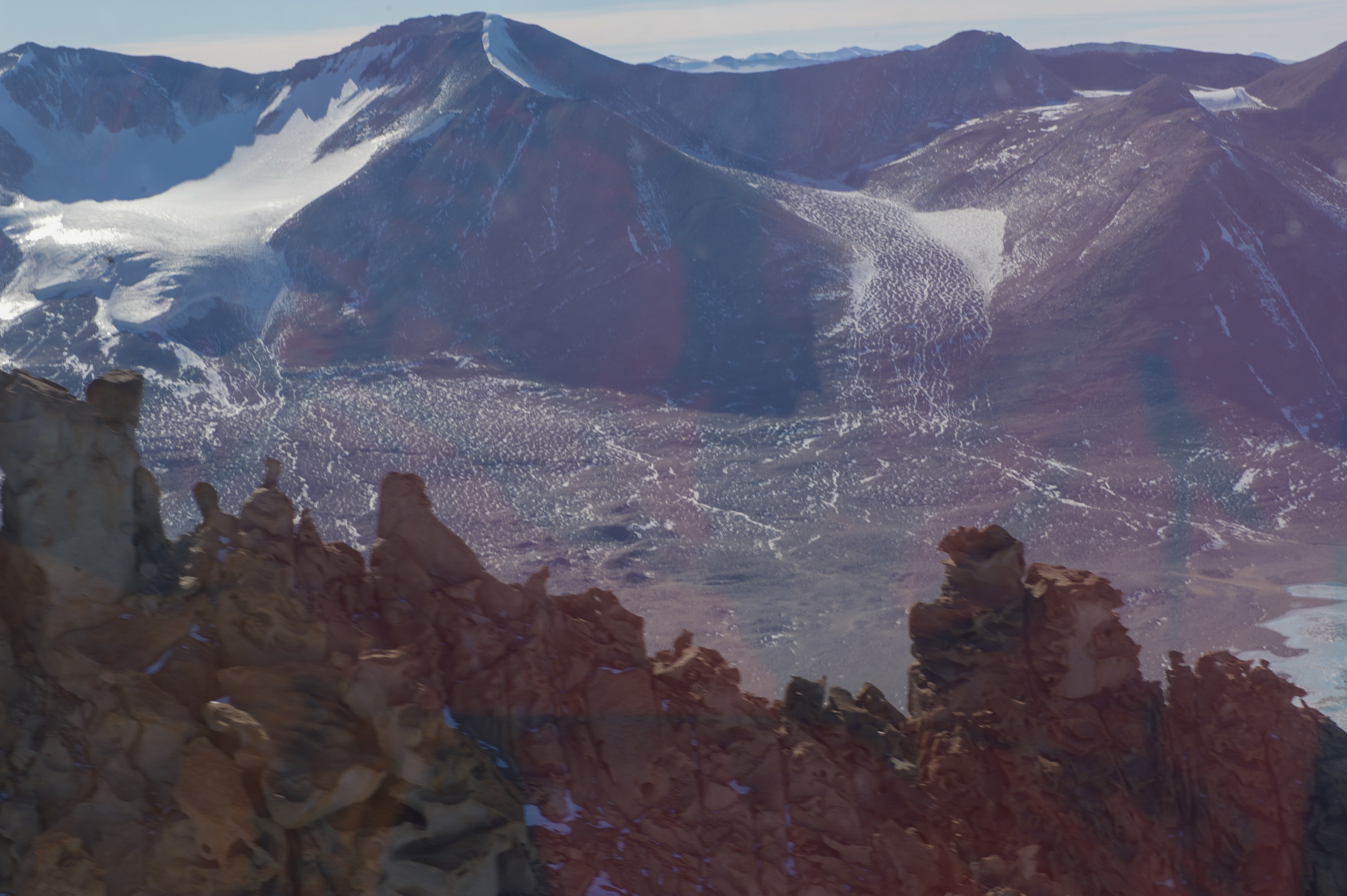
Gargoyle Ridge on November 11, 2016. Image taken by helicopter. Wright Valley visible behind the ridge.

82°24′S 159°30′E. High rock ridge forming the south end of Cobham Range in the Churchill Mountains. So named by the Holyoake, Cobham, and Queen Elizabeth Ranges party of the NZGSAE (1964–65) because of the curiously wind-carved rock buttresses on top of the ridge.

== Nearby features ==
Nearby features include:

=== Olson Névé ===
82°07′S 158°00′E. A névé on the northwest side of Cobham Range which nourishes the Lucy and Prince Philip Glaciers, in the Churchill Mountains. Mapped by the Holyoake, Cobham and Queen Elizabeth Ranges party of the NZGSAE (1964–65). Named for Lt. Dennis A. Olson, USN, who flew the New Zealand party to the névé and supported it during the summer season. The feature is incorrectly identified as "Olsen Névé"on some maps of the late 1960s.

=== Chappell Nunataks ===
82°18′S 158°12′E. Group of nunataks 3 miles (4.8 km) west of the central part of the Cobham Range. Named by the NZGSAE (1964–65) for J. Chappell, geologist with the expedition.

=== Turret Nunatak ===
82°25′S 158°00′E. Elongated nunatak, 1,960 metres (6,430 ft) high, standing west of Cobham Range in the lower portion of Lucy Glacier. Mapped by the northern party of the NZGSAE (1961–62) and so named because of the turreted cliffs on its southern side.

=== Half Dome Nunatak ===
82°27′S 159°14′E. Nunatak lying 2 miles (3.2 km) south of Cobham Range, at the mouth of Lucy Glacier. So named by the northern party of the NZGSAE (1961–62) because it is rounded on one side and cut into sheer cliffs on the other side.

=== Kon-Tiki Nunatak ===
82°33′S 159°52′E. Raft-like nunatak, 1,300 metres (4,300 ft) high, surmounting the Cooper Icefalls in the center of Nimrod Glacier. Seen by the northern party of the NZGSAE (1961–62) and named after the raft Kon-Tiki which drifted across the Pacific Ocean from east to west in 1947.

== Sources ==
- Alberts, Fred G., ed. (1995), Geographic Names of the Antarctic (PDF) (2 ed.), United States Board on Geographic Names This article incorporates public domain material from websites or documents of the United States Board on Geographic Names.
- Laird, M. G; Mansergh, G. D.; Chappell, J. M. A. (1971), "Geology of the Central Nimrod Glacier area, Antarctica", New Zealand Journal of Geology and Geophysics, 14 (3): 427–468, doi:10.1080/00288306.1971.10421939
- Nimrod Glacier, USGS United States Geologic Survey, 1960
