= List of glaciers of Oates Land =

Location of Oates Land (red), Australian Antarctic Territory in Antarctica

Following is a list of glaciers of Oates Land in Antarctica. There are many glaciers in Oates Land, not all of which have been named. This list may not reflect recent namings.

- Ahern Glacier
- Alley Glacier
- Argo Glacier
- Argosy Glacier
- Ascent Glacier
- Astro Glacier
- Bally Glacier
- Bartrum Glacier
- Benbrook Glacier
- Bledisloe Glacier
- Brecher Glacier
- Byrd Glacier
- Deception Glacier
- DeVries Glacier
- Donnally Glacier
- Entrikin Glacier
- Exodus Glacier
- Farmer Glacier
- Fastook Glacier
- Fergusson Glacier
- Flynn Glacier
- Foggydog Glacier
- Gaussiran Glacier
- Gray Glacier
- Green Glacier
- Gutenberg Glacier
- Hatherton Glacier
- Heap Glacier
- Hinton Glacier
- Hourihan Glacier
- Judith Glacier
- Laizure Glacier
- Lashly Glacier
- Lee Glacier
- Lieske Glacier
- McCleary Glacier
- McCraw Glacier
- McLay Glacier
- McLeod Glacier
- Manna Glacier
- Matusevich Glacier
- Mercury Glacier
- Merrick Glacier
- Noll Glacier
- Odell Glacier
- Overturn Glacier
- Paternostro Glacier
- Peckham Glacier
- Prince Edward Glacier
- Prince Philip Glacier
- Ragotzkie Glacier
- Ramseier Glacier
- Robilliard Glacier
- Sefton Glacier
- Sennet Glacier
- Shimmering Icefield
- Silk Glacier
- Sivjee Glacier
- Skellerup Glacier
- Skua Glacier
- Sylwester Glacier
- Tomilin Glacier
- Touchdown Glacier
- Twombley Glacier
- Walsh Glacier
- Yancey Glacier
- Zeller Glacier
