= Mount Archer =

Mount Archer may refer to:

- Mount Archer (Antarctica), a rock point in Antarctica
- Mount Archer, Queensland (disambiguation), various place names in Queensland, Australia
