= Blick (disambiguation) =

Blick may refer to:

- Blick, a daily Swiss newspaper
- Blick Art Materials
- Mount Blick, a mountain in East Antarctica
- Blickensderfer, an early typewriter make
- Blick, a slang term for a pistol
- Hugo Blick, English filmmaker
- Dick Blick (swimmer), American athlete
- Graeme Blick, Chief Geodesist of New Zealand
- Joseph Blick (1867 - 1947), American architect
- Raymond Blick, a British sprint canoer
- Roy Early Blick, 20th century American law enforcement official
- Shy Blick, American serial technology entrepreneur and co-founder of Blooma.AI

== See also ==
- Blick's grass rat, a species of rodent
- Blic, a Serbian tabloid
- Blikk, a Hungarian tabloid
