= Arthurson =

Arthurson is a surname meaning "son of Arthur". Notable people with the surname include:

- Charles Arthurson, Canadian Anglican bishop
- Ken Arthurson (born 1929), Australian rugby league player

== See also ==
- Arthurson Bluff, cliff of Victoria Land, Antarctica
- Arthurson Ridge, ridge of Oates Land, Antarctica
