= Aviation Island =

Aviation Island may refer to:

- Aviation Islands in Antarctica
- An islet in Palmyra Atoll, US Minor Outlying Islands
