= Mount Zinkovich =

Mountain in Ross Dependency, Antarctica

- Location within Antarctica

Geography
- Location: Antarctica
- Region: Ross Dependency
- Range coordinates: 81°08′S 158°21′E

Mount Zinkovich (81°08′S 158°21′E) is a pointed mountain, 2,280 metres (7,480 ft) high, standing 4 miles (6.4 km) north of Mount Frost at the north side of the head of Silk Glacier in the Churchill Mountains of Antarctica.

== Name ==
Mount Zinkovich was named by US-ACAN for Lt. Col. Michael Zinkovich, USAF, commanding officer of the 1710th Aerial Port Squadron, which furnished airlift support between New Zealand and Antarctica, and from McMurdo Sound inland to Byrd, Eights, and South Pole Stations during USN OpDFrz 1962.

== Location ==
Mount Zinkovich is on a ridge that extends from Pyramid Mountain to the south, through Mount Coley, Mount Frost, Mount Zinkovich, and further north past Mount Wharton and Turk Peak. The Silk Glacier is fed from this ridge just south of Mount Zinkovich and flows east to join Nursery Glacier. The Jorda Glacier is fed from the ridge between Pyramid Mountain and Mount Coley, and also flows east to join Nursery Glacier. To the west is the Byrd Névé, from which rise the Wallabies Nunataks and the All-Blacks Nunataks.

The Sailing Directions for Antarctica describes the ridge as follows:

Mount Wharton, about 8,850 feet high, lies westward of Cape Parr and is the highest of a series of four peaks, rising like teeth of a saw. On the southern side of Mount Wharton, the coastal range appears broken for about 5 miles, then rises to Pyramid Mountain, a remarkably sharp apex approximately 9,000 feet high, with uniform sides which rest on a base of irregular country several thousand feet below the summit.

== Nearby Features ==
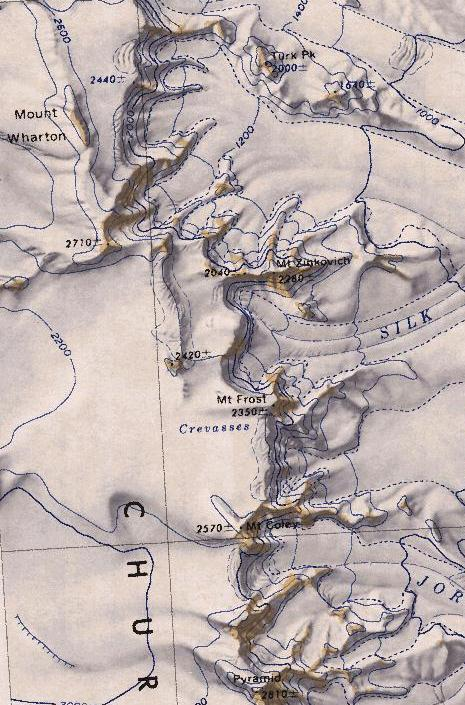
Mount Zinkovich and surroundings

Nearby features, from south to north:

=== Kilroy Bluff ===
81.25°S 159.7°E. An ice-covered bluff, 1,040 metres (3,410 ft) high, on the west side of Nursery Glacier at the junction with Jorda Glacier. The east face of the feature is indented by twin cirques that resemble eyes. Under certain light conditions, the bluff's appearance is reminiscent of ubiquitous Kilroy graffiti from World War II: a caricature of a head peering over a wall and the message "Kilroy was here".

=== Mount Coley ===
81°15′S 158°13′E. A mountain, 2,570 metres (8,430 ft), standing 3 miles (4.8 km) south of Mount Frost, in the Churchill Mountains. Named by US-ACAN for Cdr. Vernon J. Coley, commanding officer of USN Squadron VX-6 in Antarctica, 1957–58.

=== Young Peaks ===
81.2333333°S 158.7°E Young Peaks is a group of peaks along a ridge running west–east, starting 5 km east of Mount Coley. The feature is 5 km long with summits rising above 1200 m. Flanked by Lee Glacier to the north and Jorda Glacier to the south. Named in honour of Pamela Young, who was the first female event member in the New Zealand Antarctic Research Programme (NZARP).

=== Mount Frost ===
81°11′S 158°21′E. Mountain, 2,350 metres (7,710 ft) high, in the Churchill Mountains, standing 4 miles (6.4 km) south of Mount Zinkovich, at the south side of the head of Silk Glacier. Named by US-ACAN for Lt. Col. Foy B. Frost, USAF, commanding officer of the Ninth Troop Carrier Squadron, which furnished C-124 Globemaster airlift support between New Zealand and the Antarctic and from McMurdo Sound inland to Byrd, Eights, and South Pole Stations during USN OpDFrz 1962.

=== Mount Wharton ===
81°03′S 157°49′E. A mountain over 2,800 metres (9,200 ft), standing 5.5 miles (8.9 km) west of Turk Peak in the Churchill Mountains. Discovered by the BrNAE (1901–04) and named for Sir William Wharton, Hydrographer to the Royal Navy, 1884–1904.

=== Turk Peak ===
81°02′S 158°23′E. A large hump-shaped peak, 2,000 metres (6,600 ft) high, is the central of three peaks on a ridge 6 miles (9.7 km) north of Mount Zinkovich, in the Churchill Mountains. Named by US-ACAN for Lt. Col. Wilbert Turk, commander of the 61st Troop Carrier Squadron, which initiated the flights of C-130 Hercules aircraft in Antarctica in January 1960.

=== Bradshaw Peak ===
81.05°S 158.5666667°E A peak rising to 1,640 metres (5,380 ft), 4 kilometres (2.5 mi) southeast of Turk Peak. Situated on the southwest side of McLay Glacier. Named in honour of Margaret Bradshaw, a geologist at the University of Canterbury, who, in 1979, was the first woman to lead a deep field party in Antarctica. Bradshaw is also the only New Zealand woman to have been awarded a Polar Medal.

== Sources ==
- Alberts, Fred G., ed. (1995), Geographic Names of the Antarctic (PDF) (2 ed.), United States Board on Geographic Names This article incorporates public domain material from websites or documents of the United States Board on Geographic Names.
- "Bradshaw Peak", Geographic Names Information System, United States Geological Survey, United States Department of the Interior
- "Kilroy Bluff", Geographic Names Information System, United States Geological Survey, United States Department of the Interior
- Mount Nares, USGS United States Geologic Survey, 1960
- Sailing Directions for Antarctica: Includes Islands South of Latitude 600, U.S. Naval Oceanographic Office, 1960
- Wilhoite Nunataks, USGS
- "Young Peaks", Geographic Names Information System, United States Geological Survey, United States Department of the Interior
