= Arthurson Ridge =

Important Bird Area in Antarctica

- Coastal ridge
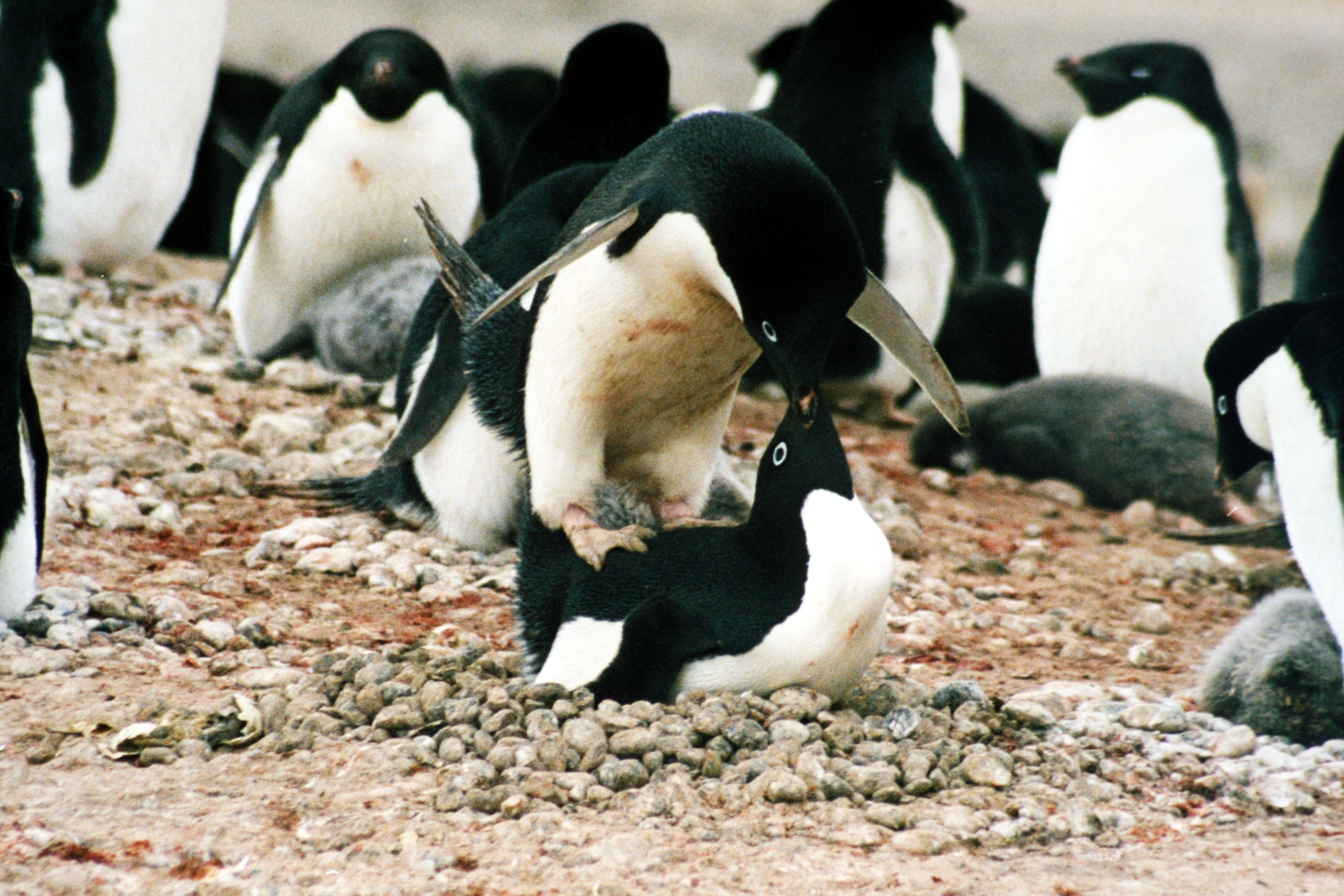
- Mating Adélie penguins

- Location within Antarctica
- Coordinates: 69°22′S 158°30′E
- Location: Oates Land, Antarctica
- Part of: Wilson Hills
- Etymology: ANARE helicopter pilot J. Arthurson

Arthurson Ridge is a short coastal ridge or promontory, a northern extension from the Wilson Hills, rising between Cook Ridge and the terminus of McLeod Glacier at the head of Davies Bay, Antarctica. It was photographed from aircraft of U.S. Navy Operation Highjump, 1946–47, and first visited by an Australian National Antarctic Research Expeditions (ANARE) airborne field party in March 1961. It was named for J. Arthurson, helicopter pilot with ANARE on the MV Magga Dan in 1961.

== Important Bird Area ==
The 154 ha ice-free outcrop has been identified as an Important Bird Area by BirdLife International because it supports a breeding colony of about 14,000 pairs of Adélie penguins. An emperor penguin colony is situated nearby in Davis Bay.
