= Kartografov Island =

Island in Oates Land, Antarctica

- Location within Antarctica

Geography
- Location: Oates Land, Antarctica
- Coordinates: 69°12′S 157°43′E
- Length: 0.5 km (0.31 mi)

Administration
- Administered under the Antarctic Treaty System

Demographics
- Population: Uninhabited

Kartografov Island is a small coastal island lying in the western part of the mouth of Harald Bay, Oates Land, Antarctica. It was photographed by U.S. Navy Operation Highjump (1946–47), the Soviet Antarctic Expedition (1957–58) and the Australian National Antarctic Research Expedition (1959). The island was named "Ostrov Kartografov" (Cartographers' Island) by the Soviet expedition.

== Important Bird Area ==
A 204 ha site comprising the whole of Kartografov Island, as well as the lower eastern extremity of neighbouring Mount Archer, and including the intervening marine area, has been designated an Important Bird Area (IBA) by BirdLife International because it supports about 21,000 breeding pairs of Adélie penguins, as estimated by 2012 satellite imagery.

== See also ==
- List of Antarctic and Subantarctic islands
