= Lazarev Mountains, Antarctica =

Chain of mountains in Antarctica

Lazarev Mountains
- Location within Antarctica

Dimensions
- Length: 25 nautical miles (50 km)

Naming
- Etymology: Mikhail Petrovich Lazarev, commander of the Mirnyy

Geography
- Continent: Antarctica
- Area: Oates Land
- Range coordinates: 69°32′S 157°20′E

The Lazarev Mountains (69°32′S 157°20′E) are a chain of mountains in Antarctica. They extend along the west side of Matusevich Glacier southward of Eld Peak, and are about 25 nautical miles (46 km; 29 mi) long.

== Discovery and naming ==
The Lazarev Mountains were photographed from the air by United States Navy Operation Highjump (1946–1947), the Soviet Antarctic Expedition (1957–1958) and an Australian National Antarctic Research Expedition (ANARE) (1959). They were named by the Soviet expedition after Lieutenant Mikhail Petrovich Lazarev, commander of the sloop Mirnyy of the Bellingshausen expedition (1819–1821).

== Features ==
Features include, from south to north, the Arkhangel'skiy Nunataks including Outrider Nunatak, Rescue Nunatak, Mount Martyn and Eld Peak.

=== Arkhangel'skiy Nunataks ===
69°28′S 156°30′E. A group of scattered rock outcrops about 15 nautical miles (28 km; 17 mi) west of the central part of Lazarev Mountains. Photographed by United States Navy Operation Highjump, 1946–47, the Soviet Antarctic Expedition, 1958, and Australian National Antarctic Research Expedition (ANARE), 1959. The largest of the outcrops had been named by the Soviet expedition after Soviet geologist A.D. Arkhangel'skiy. The broader application of the name to the entire group follows the recommendation by ANCA.

=== Outrider Nunatak ===
69°28′S 156°23′E. A prominent nunatak, 1,250 metres (4,100 ft) high, in the north-central portion of the Arkhangel'skiy Nunataks. The feature was photographed from aircraft of United States Navy Operation Highjump on January 4, 1947. The summit of the nunatak was intersected by members of the United States Geological Survey (USGS) Topo West Traverse, 1962-63. Named by the New Zealand Geological Survey Antarctic Expedition (NZGSAE), 1963–64, presumably because of its forward position in the group.

=== Rescue Nunatak ===
69°37′S 157°27′E. A nunatak 14 nautical miles (26 km; 16 mi) south-southeast of Mount Martyn in the southern Lazarev Mountains. The feature lies along the west side of upper Matusevich Glacier. Plotted by ANARE from photos taken by United States Navy Operation Highjump (1946–47) and ANARE (1959). Visited by NZGSAE (1963–64) who gave the name because of the rescue, in bitter conditions, of a sledge and dogs which had fallen into a nearby crevasse.

=== Mount Martyn ===
69°24′S 157°10′E. A cluster of bare rock faces with one peak, standing 3 nautical miles (5.6 km; 3.5 mi) south of Eld Peak in the Lazarev Mountains. This is probably the most prominent rock outcrop on the west side of Matusevich Glacier. Photographed by United States Navy Operation Highjump, 1946-47. Photographed on February 20, 1959, by ANARE (Magga Dan) led by Phillip Law, and named for D.F. Martyn, a member of the AN ARE Executive Planning Committee.

=== Eld Peak ===
69°20′S 157°12′E. A prominent peak, 800 metres (2,600 ft) high, rising 6 nautical miles (11 km; 6.9 mi) southeast of Reynolds Peak on the west side of Matusevich Glacier. Two conical peaks were sighted in the area from the Peacock on January 16, 1840 by Passed Midshipmen Henry Eld and William Reynolds of the USEE (1838 42). The southeastern peak was named for Eld by USEE leader Lt. Charles Wilkes. In 1959 Phillip Law of ANARE made investigations of features in this area. Reference to Wilkes' narrative showed that the recorded descriptions of the peaks sighted by Eld and Reynolds to be in accord with photographs of the peaks on the west side of Matusevich Glacier. The peak described was selected by Law to commemorate Wilkes' naming.

== Northern features ==
Features to the north, along the west of the Matusevich Glacier, include the Burnside Ridges, Reynolds Peak, Drury Nunatak, Coombes Ridge and Magga Peak.

=== Burnside Ridges ===
69°12′S 157°10′E. Three roughly parallel ridges running approximately northeast-southwest with their northeast extremities terminating at Matusevich Glacier. This area was photographed from the air by United States Navy Operation Highjump in 1947. The feature was sketched and photographed on February 20, 1959 by Phillip Law, leader of the ANARE (Magga Dan) expedition. Named by ANCA after Lt. Cdr. I.M. Burnside, RAN, hydrographic surveyor on the Magga Dan during the voyage.

=== Reynolds Peak ===
69°16′S 157°01′E. A prominent peak, 785 metres (2,575 ft) high, rising 6 nautical miles (11 km; 6.9 mi) northwest of Eld Peak on the west side of Matusevich Glacier. Two conical peaks were sighted in the area from the Peacock on Jan. 16, 1840 by Passed Midshipmen William Reynolds and Henry Eld of the USEE (1838–42). The northwestern peak was named for Reynolds by USEE leader Lt. Charles Wilkes. In 1959 Phillip Law of ANARE made investigations of features in this area. Reference to Wilkes' narrative showed that the recorded descriptions of the peaks seen by Reynolds and Eld to be in accord with photographs of the peaks on the west side of Matusevich Glacier. The peak described was selected by Law to commemorate Wilkes' naming.

=== Drury Nunatak ===
69°14′S 156°58′E. A bare, black, isolated nunatak standing up boldly from the ice at the head of Lauritzen Bay, 1.5 nautical miles (2.8 km; 1.7 mi) northwest of Reynolds Peak. The feature was observed and charted on Feb. 20, 1959 by ANARE (Magga Dan) led by Phillip Law. Named by ANCA for Alan Campbell-Drury, Photographic Officer of the Antarctic Division who accompanied this expedition.

=== Coombes Ridge ===
69°08′S 157°05′E. A rocky coastal ridge 2 nautical miles (3.7 km; 2.3 mi) west of Magga Peak. The ridge, which runs roughly north–south, forms the east extremity of Lauritzen Bay. This area was photographed from the air by United States Navy Operation Highjump in 1947. The ridge was mapped on February 20, 1959 by ANARE (Magga Dan), led by Phillip Law. Named by ANCA for Bruce Coombes, airport engineer, Australian Dept. of Civil Aviation, who accompanied the expedition to investigate potential airfield sites at Wilkes Station and elsewhere.

=== Magga Peak ===
69°10′S 157°11′E. A triangular "flatiron" shaped wall of sheer rock forming the end of the northernmost of the Burnside Ridges. The summit is a sharp point. Photographed by United States Navy Operation Highjump in 1947. A first landing from a ship was made on Feb. 20, 1959 by ANARE (Magga Dan) led by Phillip Law.

== Nearby features ==
=== Berg Mountains ===
69°13′S 156°04′E. A mountain and two ridges 14 nautical miles (26 km; 16 mi) south of Cape Buromskiy, Krylov Peninsula. Photographed by United States Navy Operation Highjump, 1946–47, the Soviet Antarctic Expedition, 1958, and ANARE, 1959. The feature was visited by an airborne survey party from the Soviet expedition and called "Gory L'va Berga" after the Soviet geographer Lev Berg.

== Sources ==
- Alberts, Fred G., ed. (1995), Geographic Names of the Antarctic (PDF) (2 ed.), United States Board on Geographic Names This article incorporates public domain material from websites or documents of the United States Board on Geographic Names.
- SR 57-58 2023 Edition Map Catalogue No.15582 (PDF), Australian Antarctic Division, 2023, ISBN 978-1-876934-48-4

This article incorporates public domain material from websites or documents of the United States Geological Survey.
