= Margaret Bradshaw =

British-born New Zealand geologist

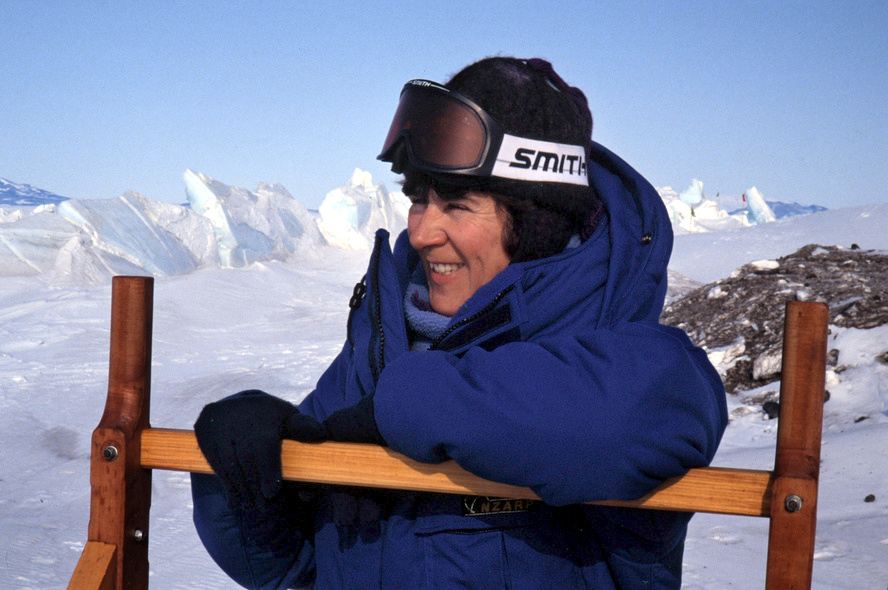
- Bradshaw in Antarctica in 1991
- Born: Margaret Ann Cresswell; 31 December 1941 (age 84); Nottingham, Nottinghamshire, England
- Citizenship: New Zealand
- Spouse: John Bradshaw (m. 1963; died 2025)
- Awards: Polar Medal; Royal Society of New Zealand Science & Technology Medal
- Scientific career
- Fields: Geology
- Workplaces: University of Canterbury; Canterbury Museum

Margaret Ann Bradshaw (née Cresswell; born 31 December 1941) is a New Zealand geologist and a retired staff member at the University of Canterbury. She is considered a trailblazer and influential female role model in Antarctic research.

== Early life and education ==
Born Margaret Ann Cresswell in Nottingham, England, on 31 December 1941, she married John Dudley Bradshaw in Nottingham in 1963, and they moved to Christchurch, New Zealand, in 1966. Bradshaw began her work there on Devonian invertebrate palaeontology, gradually incorporating Antarctica into her research. She became a naturalised New Zealand citizen in 1980.

== Career and impact ==
Bradshaw focused her research on the structure and stratigraphy of Devonian rocks, around 400 million years old, in New Zealand and Antarctica. Specifically she worked on the development and relationship of Paleozoic terrains in New Zealand, as well as the paleobiogeography of Devonian Bivalves and the Paleontology and environmental significance of Paleozoic Trace fossils in both New Zealand, Antarctica and Australia. Bradshaw was a curator at the Canterbury Museum and her initial trips to Antarctica were to collect fossils and rocks for the Antarctic display.

Bradshaw was the curator of Geology at the Canterbury Museum for 17 years. Her first trip to Antarctica was from 1975 to 1976 to collect specimens for the museum's Antarctic Hall. Bradshaw was the first woman to lead an Antarctic deep field party in her 1979 to 1980 field season to the remote Ohio Range. Her continued research within the Ohio Range, specifically the Horlick Formation, led to substantial development with the identification and naming of several lithofacies and trace fossils. She was the first to discover new fish fossils in the exposures of the Cook Mountains in her 1988 to 1989 field season.

Bradshaw was the president of the New Zealand Antarctic Society for 10 years until 2003. She is a member of the Association of Australian Paleontologists.

== Awards and honours ==
Bradshaw is the second woman to win the Queen's Polar Medal, and the first New Zealand woman to be awarded this medal, in 1993. She received the Royal Society of New Zealand Science & Technology Medal in 1994. Bradshaw is a New Zealand Antarctic Society Life Member, nominated in 2006. In 2017, Bradshaw was selected as one of the Royal Society Te Apārangi's "150 women in 150 words", celebrating the contributions of women to knowledge in New Zealand.

Bradshaw Peak, situated on the south west side of the McLay Glacier in Antarctica, is named in her honour. Bradshaw, alongside two other women that also played major roles in New Zealand's Antarctic Research Programme, has a laboratory named after her situated at Scott Base.

== Later life ==
Bradshaw's husband, John Bradshaw, died in 2025.
