= Benbrook (disambiguation) =

Benbrook is a city in Tarrant County, Texas, near Fort Worth.

Benbrook may also refer to:

- Benbrook Glacier, a glacier in the Churchill Mountains
- Benbrook Lake, a lake near the Texas city of the same name
- Benbrook Field, an airfield also near the Texas city of the same name
- Chuck Benbrook, an agricultural economist at Washington State University
