= Carlstrom Foothills =

Mountain in Ross Dependency, Antarctica

- Location within Antarctica

Geography
- Location: Antarctica
- Region: Ross Dependency
- Range coordinates: 81°25′S 159°0′E

The Carlstrom Foothills (81°25′S 159°0′E) are a group of peaks and ridges in the Churchill Mountains, Antarctica.

== Location ==
Carlstrom Foothills run north–south between Mount Albert Markham and Kelly Plateau. The feature is 10 nautical miles (20 km) long with summits rising to 1,690 metres (5,540 ft). It is bounded by Jorda Glacier to the north and Flynn Glacier to the south.

It was named by the Advisory Committee on Antarctic Names after John Carlstrom of the department of astronomy and astrophysics, University of Chicago; projects director, Center for Astrophysical Research in Antarctica at South Pole Station from 2001.

== Glaciers ==
=== Jorda Glacier ===
81°18′S 159°49′E. A glacier, about 15 miles (24 km) long, draining the east slopes of the Churchill Mountains between Mount Coley and Pyramid Mountain and merging with the lower Nursery Glacier just before the latter enters the Ross Ice Shelf. Named by US-ACAN for Lt. Cdr. Henry P. Jorda, USN, pilot with Squadron VX-6 during USN OpDFrz I, 1955-56.

=== Bally Glacier ===
81°22′S 159°12′E. A glacier 6 nautical miles (11 km) long which occupies the central part of the Carlstrom Foothills. It flows north along the east side of Mount Blick into Jorda Glacier. It was named by the Advisory Committee on Antarctic Names after John Bally of the University of Colorado Center for Astrophysics and Space Astronomy, Boulder, Colorado; he was a United States Antarctic Program principal investigator and field team member of the Advanced Telescope Project, South Pole Center for Astrophysical Research in Antarctica, 1992–95.

=== Flynn Glacier ===
81°31′S 159°21′E. A glacier about 10 miles (16 km) long, draining eastward from Mount Nares in the Churchill Mountains and entering Starshot Glacier south of Kelly Plateau. Named by US-ACAN for Cdr. William F. Flynn (CEC), USN, commanding officer Mobile Construction Battalion, Special Detachment Bravo, at McMurdo Sound, winter 1957.

=== Benbrook Glacier ===
81°27′S 158°55′E. A glacier 5 nautical miles (9 km) long in the Churchill Mountains. It flows south-southeast from Egress Peak, Carlstrom Foothills, into the Flynn Glacier. It was named after James R. Benbrook of the Department of Physics, University of Houston, Texas, a United States Antarctic Program team member in balloon-borne investigation of the ionosphere and magnetosphere over the Geographic South Pole, 1985–95.

== Features ==
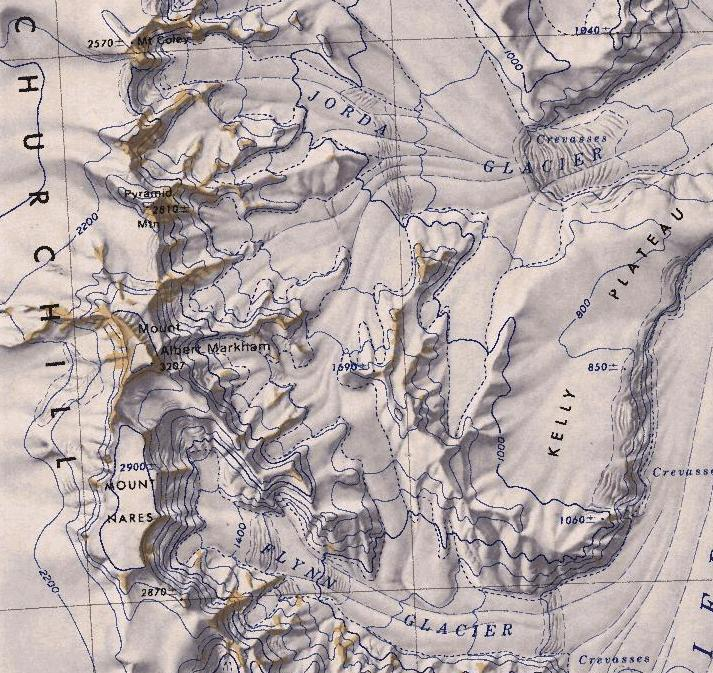
Carlstrom Foothills region

Geographical features include:

=== Egress Peak ===
81°24′S 158°54′E. A peak rising to 1,690 metres (5,540 ft) 6 nautical miles (11 km) east of Mount Albert Markham. Situated at the western extremity of the Carlstrom Foothills, the peak overlooks a 1,400-metre (4,600 ft) ice divide. Benbrook Glacier flows south from the divide into Flynn Glacier; an unnamed glacier flows north from the divide into Jorda Glacier. The peak was so named by the Advisory Committee on Antarctic Names because of the emergence of the two glaciers adjacent to this peak.

=== Mount Blick ===
81°21′S 159°5′E. A conical peak rising to over 1400 m in the north extremity of Carlstrom Foothills. The peak is on the west side of Bally Glacier, 8 nautical miles (15 km) east-southeast of Pyramid Mountain. Named by Advisory Committee on Antarctic Names (US-ACAN) in honor of Graeme Blick, Geodetic Survey Advisor, Office of the New Zealand Surveyor-General, 1996–2002. From 1998 to the present he has worked closely with the United States Geological Survey on geodetic surveys in the Ross Sea Region and has overseen the development of the new Ross Sea Region Geodetic Datum 2000.

=== Pernic Bluff ===
81°29′S 159°30′E.

An ice-covered bluff, 1,060 metres (3,480 ft), at the south end of Kelly Plateau and Carlstrom Foothills. The bluff rises 700 m above the terminus of Flynn Glacier at the junction with Starshot Glacier. Named by Advisory Committee on Antarctic Names (US-ACAN) after Robert J. Pernic, electrical engineer, University of Yerkes Observatory, Williams Bay, Wisconsin; team leader for polar operations in support of CARA-wide projects at the United States Antarctic Program (USAP) Center for Astrophysical Research in Antarctica at the South Pole Station, 1991–2002.

== Nearby Features ==
=== Mount Nares ===
81°27′S 158°10′E A massive mountain, over 3,000 metres (9,800 ft), standing just south of Mount Albert Markham and overlooking the head of Flynn Glacier. Discovered by the BrNAE (1901-04) led by Scott, who named it for Sir George S. Nares, captain of the Challenger during part of its cruise of 1872-74, leader of an Arctic expedition in 1875-76, and a member of the Ship Committee for Scott's expedition.

=== Peacock Heights ===
81°33′S 158°45′E. A bold array of peaks and ridges, 11 nautical miles (20 km) long and 5 nautical miles (9 km) wide, extending east-southeast from Mount Nares. The feature rises from about 600 metres (2,000 ft) on Starshot Glacier to about 2,600 metres (8,500 ft) near Mount Nares and forms the divide between Flynn Glacier and Donnally Glacier. Named by Advisory Committee on Antarctic Names (US-ACAN) after Dennis S. Peacock (Peacock Peak, q.v.), Director, Solar-Terrestrial Physics Program in the Division of Atmospheric Sciences, National Science Foundation, 1975–87; Section Head for Upper Atmospheric Research, 1988–91; U.S. Antarctic Program Chief Scientist, 1991–2002, concurrently serving as Head, Polar Sciences Section in the National Science Foundation (NSF) Office of Polar Programs.

=== Mount Albert Markham ===
80°23′S 158°14′E. A striking flat-topped mountain, 3,205 m, standing midway between Mount Nares and Pyramid Mountain. Discovered by the BrNAE (1901-04) and named for Admiral Sir Albert Hastings Markham, a member of the Ship Committee for the expedition.

=== Pyramid Mountain ===
81°19′S 158°15′E. A conspicuous pyramidal mountain, 2,810 metres (9,220 ft) high, standing 4 miles (6.4 km) north of Mount Albert Markham. Discovered and named by the BrNAE, 1901-04.

=== Kelly Plateau ===
81°24′S 159°30′E. An ice-covered plateau, about 15 miles (24 km) long and from 2 to 4 miles (3.2 to 6.4 km) wide, located on the east side of the Churchill Mountains between the lower parts of Jorda and Flynn Glaciers. Named by US-ACAN for Cdr. George R. Kelly, USN, commanding officer of USN Squadron VX-6 during OpDFrz 1964.

=== Sleek Spur ===
81.3166667°N 160.2°E. A tapered, ice-covered coastal spur at the east end of Kelly Plateau. The spur is 8 miles (13 km) southwest of Cape Parr where the confluent Nursery, Jorda, and Starshot Glaciers enter Ross Ice Shelf. Named descriptively by Advisory Committee on Antarctic Names (US-ACAN).

== Sources ==
- Alberts, Fred G., ed. (1995), Geographic Names of the Antarctic (PDF) (2 ed.), United States Board on Geographic Names This article incorporates public domain material from websites or documents of the United States Board on Geographic Names.
- "Bally Glacier", Geographic Names Information System, United States Geological Survey, United States Department of the Interior
- "Benbrook Glacier", Geographic Names Information System, United States Geological Survey, United States Department of the Interior
- "Carlstrom Foothills", Geographic Names Information System, United States Geological Survey, United States Department of the Interior
- "Egress Peak", Geographic Names Information System, United States Geological Survey, United States Department of the Interior
- "Mount Blick", Geographic Names Information System, United States Geological Survey, United States Department of the Interior
- Mount Nares, USGS United States Geologic Survey, 1960
- "Peacock Heights", Geographic Names Information System, United States Geological Survey, United States Department of the Interior
- "Pernic Bluff", Geographic Names Information System, United States Geological Survey, United States Department of the Interior
- "Sleek Spur", Geographic Names Information System, United States Geological Survey, United States Department of the Interior
- This article incorporates public domain material from websites or documents of the United States Geological Survey.
