= Suvorov Glacier =

Glacier in Antarctica

- Location within Antarctica
- Type: Outlet glacier
- Location: East Antarctica
- Coordinates: 69°56′S 160°0′E
- Terminus: Southern Ocean

Suvorov Glacier (69°56′S 160°0′E) is a glacier, 5 nautical miles (9.3 km; 5.8 mi) wide, flowing east from the Wilson Hills and discharging into the sea south of Northrup Head and Belousov Point. The glacier was mapped by the Soviet Antarctic Expedition, 1958, and named after V.S. Suvorov, Soviet mechanic who perished in the Arctic.

== Location ==
The Suvorov Glacier forms in the Wilson Hills and flows east to the Southern Ocean. Mount Steele, Mount Ellery, the Hornblende Bluffs, Heth Ridge and Mount Send are to the west. To the north, near its mouth, it passes Northrup Head, Whited Inlet and Belousov Point on the Anderson Peninsula.

== Features ==
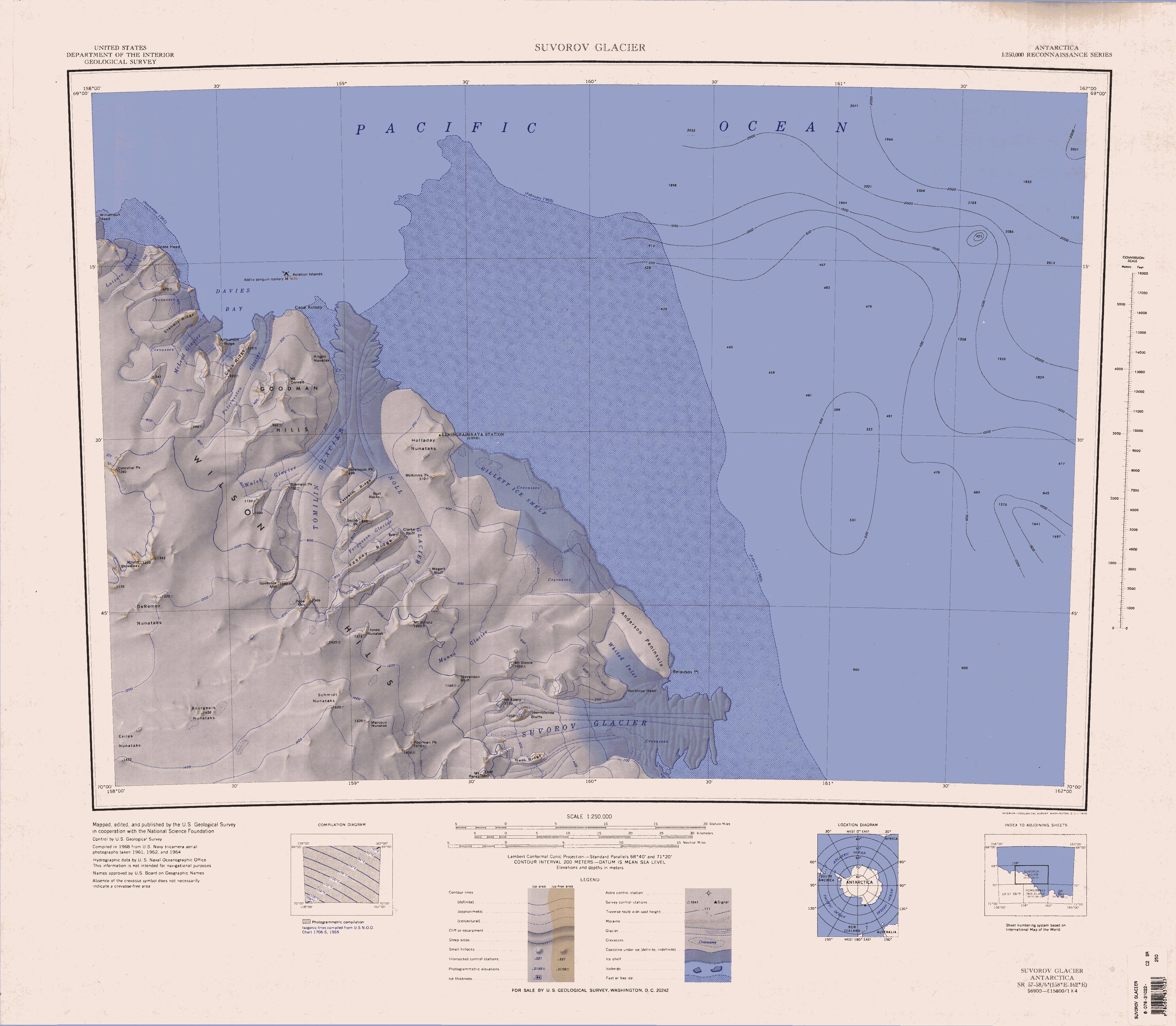
Suvorov Glacier in south east of map

=== Hornblende Bluffs ===
69°54′S 159°45′E. Prominent bluffs that rise to 1,050 metres (3,440 ft) high, located 2 nautical miles (3.7 km; 2.3 mi) southeast of Mount Ellery and near the head of Suvorov Glacier, in Wilson Hills. So named by the northern party of New Zealand Geological Survey Antarctic Expedition (NZGSAE), 1963-64, who found the rock here contains the mineral hornblende.

=== Heth Ridge ===
69°58′S 159°45′E. A ridge 3 nautical miles (5.6 km; 3.5 mi) long, located 4 nautical miles (7.4 km; 4.6 mi) south of Hornblende Bluffs and near the head of Suvorov Glacier, in the Wilson Hills. Mapped by United States Geological Survey (USGS) from surveys and United States Navy air photos, 1960-63. Named by United States Advisory Committee on Antarctic Names (US-ACAN) for Samuel R. Heth, United States Antarctic Research Program (USARP) biologist at Hallett Station, 1968-69.

=== Northrup Head ===
69°52′S 160°09′E. An ice-covered headland on the north side of Suvorov Glacier. The headland, a coastal extension of the Wilson Hills, stands 3.5 nautical miles (6.5 km; 4.0 mi) west-southwest of Belousov Point. Mapped by USGS from surveys and United States Navy air photos, 1960-63. Named by US-ACAN for David A. Northrup, ATN2, United States Navy, Aviation Electronics Technician with Squadron VX-6 at McMurdo Station, 1967.

=== Whited Inlet ===
69°50′S 160°08′E. An ice-filled inlet along the coast between Northrup Head and Anderson Peninsula. Mapped by USGS from surveys and United States Navy air photos, 1960-63. Named by US-ACAN for Master Chief Quartermaster Robert J. Whited, United States Navy, Leading Chief for the staff and a member of Operations Division responsible for maintaining and updating charts for Task Force 43 during Operation Deep Freeze 1968 and 1969.

=== Anderson Peninsula ===
69°48′S 160°13′E. Low ice-covered peninsula, 7 nautical miles (13 km; 8.1 mi) long, terminating in Belousov Point. The feature lies between Gillett Ice Shelf and Suvorov Glacier on the coastal margin of the Wilson Hills. Mapped by USGS from surveys and United States Navy air photos, 1960-64. Named by US-ACAN for Lieutenant (later Captain) Richard E. Anderson, CEC, United States Navy, base public works officer at McMurdo Sound during Operation Deep Freeze I and II. He wintered over in the McMurdo area during the latter operation, 1957.

== Sources ==
- Alberts, Fred G., ed. (1995), Geographic Names of the Antarctic (PDF) (2 ed.), United States Board on Geographic Names This article incorporates public domain material from websites or documents of the United States Board on Geographic Names.
- Pomerantz Tableland, USGS: United States Geological Survey
- Suvorov Glacier, USGS: United States Geological Survey

This article incorporates public domain material from websites or documents of the United States Geological Survey.
