= Tomilin Glacier =

Glacier in Antarctica

- Location within Antarctica
- Type: Outlet glacier
- Location: East Antarctica
- Coordinates: 69°30′S 159°0′E
- Length: 15 nautical miles (28 km; 17 mi)
- Thickness: unknown
- Terminus: Southern Ocean
- Status: unknown

The Tomilin Glacier (69°30′S 159°0′E) is a glacier over 15 nautical miles (28 km; 17 mi) long, draining north from Pope Mountain in the central Wilson Hills. It enters the sea east of Goodman Hills and Cape Kinsey, forming a substantial glacier tongue.

== Discovery and naming ==
The Tomilin Glacier was photographed from aircraft of the United States Navy Operation Highjump in 1947, and by the Soviet Antarctic Expedition 1958. It was named by the latter for Soviet polar aviator Mikhail N. Tomilin (1908–1952), who perished in the Arctic.

== Location ==
The Tomilin Glacier forms in the Wilson Hills, flowing north or northeast from Governor Mountain and Pope Mountain, and passing Feeney Ridge, Serba Peak, Axthelm Ridge and Parkinson Peak to the east. It is joined from the west by Walsh Glacier, just north of Schmehl Peak, and flows north past the Goodman Hills to enter the ocean in an ice tongue. It is joined from the southeast by Noll Glacier, which forms near Wegert Bluff and flows northwest past Clarke Bluff, where it is joined by Fergusson Glacier, past Burt Rocks and Axtberm Ridge before joining Tomilin Glacier at Parkinson Point.

== Tributaries ==
=== Walsh Glacier ===
69°33′S 158°45′E. Tributary glacier in the central part of Wilson Hills. It drains east-northeast along the south side of Goodman Hills to enter the lower part of Tomilin Glacier. Mapped by the United States Geological Survey (USGS) from surveys and United States Navy air photos, 1960-64. Named by United States Advisory Committee on Antarctic Names (US-ACAN) for Gary Walsh, United States Antarctic Research Program (USARP) biologist at Hallett Station, 1968-69.

=== Noll Glacier ===
69°33′S 159°09′E. Glacier, nearly 20 nautical miles (37 km; 23 mi) long, draining northeast from Jones Nunatak in central Wilson Hills. The glacier turns northwest at Wegert Bluff and enters the lower part of Tomilin Glacier before the latter debouches into the sea. Mapped by USGS from surveys and United States Navy air photos, 1960-64. Named by US-ACAN for Major Edmund P. Noll, USMC, Cargo Officer and LC-130 Aircraft Commander with United States Navy Squadron VX-6 during Operation Deep Freeze 1968.

=== Fergusson Glacier ===
69°38′S 159°10′E. Tributary glacier that flows northeast between Serba Peak and Feeney Ridge into Noll Glacier, in the Wilson Hills. Named by the northern party of NZGSAE, 1963-64, after Sir Bernard Fergusson, Governor-General of New Zealand, who made a flight over the party during his visit to Antarctica.

== Features ==
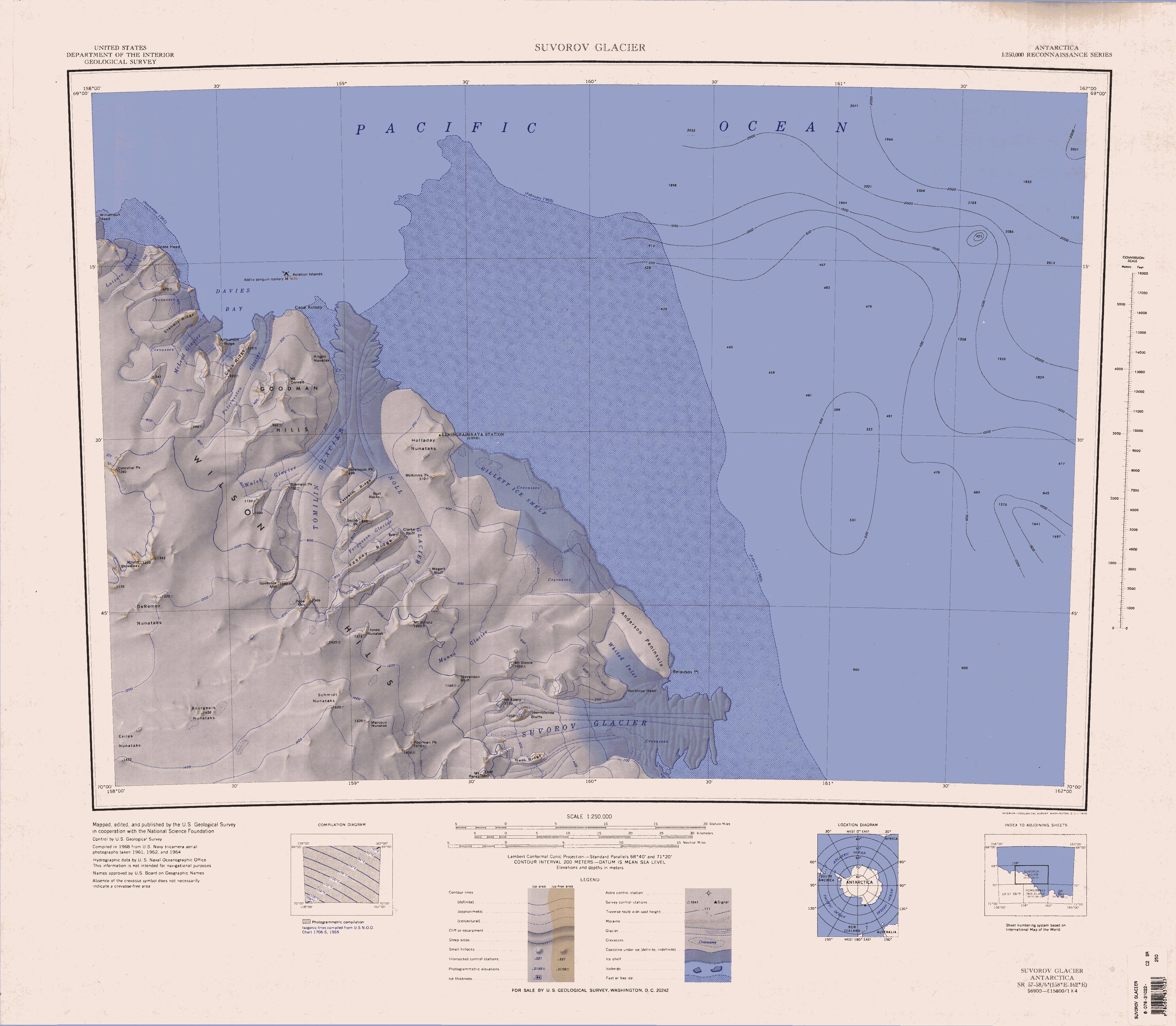
Tomilin Glacier to the northwest of the map

=== Feeney Ridge ===
69°40′S 159°06′E. A ridge, 6 nautical miles (11 km; 6.9 mi) long, which is mainly ice free along the crest. It parallels the southeast side of Fergusson Glacier in the Wilson Hills. Mapped by USGS from surveys and United States Navy air photos, 1960-63. Named by US-ACAN for Lieutenant Commander Edward J. Feeney, United States Navy, Aircraft Commander (LC-130F Hercules) during Operation Deep Freeze 1968.

=== Serba Peak ===
69°37′S 159°03′E. A prominent rock peak, 830 metres (2,720 ft) high, that surmounts the ridge along the north side of Fergusson Glacier, in the Wilson Hills. Mapped by USGS from surveys and US Navy air photos, 1960-63. Named by US-ACAN for Lieutenant Edward W. Serba, United States Navy, Navigator in LC-130F Hercules aircraft during Operation Deep Freeze 1967 and 1968.

=== Axthelm Ridge ===
69°33′S 159°02′E. A narrow ridge, 4 nautical miles (7.4 km; 4.6 mi) long, 1.5 nautical miles (2.8 km; 1.7 mi) southeast of Parkinson Peak in the Wilson Hills. Mapped by USGS from surveys and United States Navy air photos, 1960-63. Named by US-ACAN for Commander Charles E. Axthelm, United States Navy, Flag Secretary to the Commander of the United States Naval Support Force, Antarctica, during Operation Deep Freeze 1969 and 1970; Executive Officer on the USS Glacier during Deep Freeze 1965 and 1966.

=== Parkinson Peak ===
69°33′S 159°00′E. A pyramidal peak, 690 metres (2,260 ft) high, near the coast in the north-central Wilson Hills. It surmounts the north extremity of the ridge complex that is the divide between Tomilin and Noll Glaciers. Visited in March 1961 by an airborne field party from the Australian National Antarctic Research Expedition (ANARE) (Magga Dan, 1961) led by Phillip Law. Named for W.D. Parkinson, geophysicist with the expedition.

=== Schmehl Peak ===
69°34′S 158°45′E. A rock peak, 750 metres (2,460 ft) high, at the north end of the ridge overlooking the junction of the Walsh Glacier with the Tomilin Glacier, in the Wilson Hills. Mapped by USGS from surveys and United States Navy air photos, 1960-63. Named by US-ACAN for Lieutenant (j-g-) Peter W. Schmehl, United States Navy Reserve, Navigator in LC-130F Hercules aircraft during Operation Deep Freeze 1968.

=== Wegert Bluff ===
69°42′S 159°20′E. A bluff, the northeast extremity of a truncated ridge that overlooks the east margin of Noll Glacier in the Wilson Hills. Mapped by USGS from surveys and United States Navy air photos, 1960-63. Named by US-ACAN for Lieutenant Commander Sidney J. Wegert, United States Navy, pilot in LC-130F Hercules aircraft during Operation Deep Freeze 1967 and 1968.

=== Clarke Bluff ===
69°39′S 159°13′E. A steep bluff, 840 metres (2,760 ft) high, at the east end of Feeney Ridge in the Wilson Hills. Mapped by USGS from surveys and United States Navy air photos, 1960-63. Named by US-ACAN for Lieutenant (j.g.) Jon B. Clarke, United States Navy, Navigator on aerial photographic missions in LC-130F Hercules aircraft during Operation Deep Freeze 1967 and 1968.

=== Burt Rocks ===
69°35′S 159°09′E. A cluster of rocks at the west margin of Noll Glacier, 1.5 nautical miles (2.8 km; 1.7 mi) south of Axthelm Ridge, in Wilson Hills. Mapped by USGS from surveys and United States Navy air photos, 1961-64. Named by US-ACAN for DeVere E. Burt, USARP biologist at Hallett Station, 1968-69.

== Sources ==
- Alberts, Fred G., ed. (1995), Geographic Names of the Antarctic (PDF) (2 ed.), United States Board on Geographic Names This article incorporates public domain material from websites or documents of the United States Board on Geographic Names.
- Suvorov Glacier, USGS: United States Geological Survey

This article incorporates public domain material from websites or documents of the United States Geological Survey.
