= Lenfant Bluff =

Cliff in Antarctica

Lenfant Bluff (70°22′S 160°3′E) is a rock bluff marking the south side of the mouth of Svendsen Glacier, in the Usarp Mountains of Antarctica. It was mapped by the United States Geological Survey from surveys and U.S. Navy air photos, 1960–62, and was named by the Advisory Committee on Antarctic Names for Claude J.M. Lenfant, a United States Antarctic Research Program biologist at McMurdo Station, 1967–68.
