= Krylov Peninsula =

Peninsula in Oates Coast, Antarctica

- Location within Antarctica

Geography
- Location: Antarctica
- Coordinates: 69°5′S 156°20′E
- Adjacent to: Lauritzen Bay; Southern Ocean
- Length: 77 km (47.8 mi)
- Width: 38 km (23.6 mi)

Krylov Peninsula is an ice-covered peninsula west of Lauritzen Bay on Oates Coast, Antarctica. It was photographed by U.S. Navy Operation Highjump (1946–47), the Soviet Antarctic Expedition (1957–58), and the Australian National Antarctic Research Expeditions (1959). It was named by the Soviet expedition after Soviet mathematician and academic naval architect Alexei Krylov.

== See also ==
- Berg Mountains
