= Cape Buromskiy =

Headland on Oates Coast, Antarctica

Coordinates: 69°0′S 156°5′E

Cape Buromskiy is the northern point of the Krylov Peninsula. It was photographed from the air by U.S. Navy Operation Highjump in 1947, and mapped from air photos taken by the Soviet Antarctic Expedition of 1958. It was named by the latter after a member of the Soviet expedition, hydrographer N.I. Buromskiy, who died in Antarctica in 1957.
