= Darley Hills =

Range of hills in the Churchill Mountains, Antarctica

- Location within Antarctica

Highest point
- Peak: Constellation Dome
- Elevation: 1,330 m (4,360 ft)

Geography
- Location: Antarctica
- Region: Ross Dependency
- Range coordinates: 81°6′S 160°10′E

The Darley Hills (81°6′S 160°10′E) are a range of high, ice-covered coastal hills in the Churchill Mountains, Antarctica.

== Location ==
The Darley Hills overlook the Ross Ice Shelf, and trend north–south for about 20 nautical miles (40 km) between Cape Douglas and Cape Parr. To the west, they are bounded by the Skinner Saddle in the north, from which Nursery Glacier flows south and then east into the Ross Ice Shelf.

== Name ==
The hills were named by the Advisory Committee on Antarctic Names for James M. Darley, chief cartographer of the National Geographic Society, 1940–63, under whose direction many important maps of Antarctica were published.

== Features ==
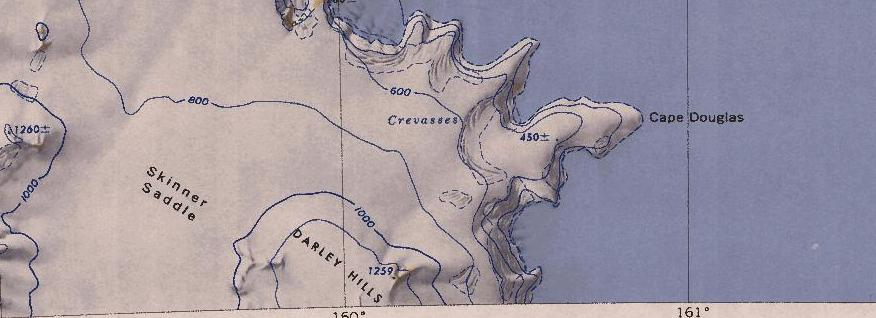
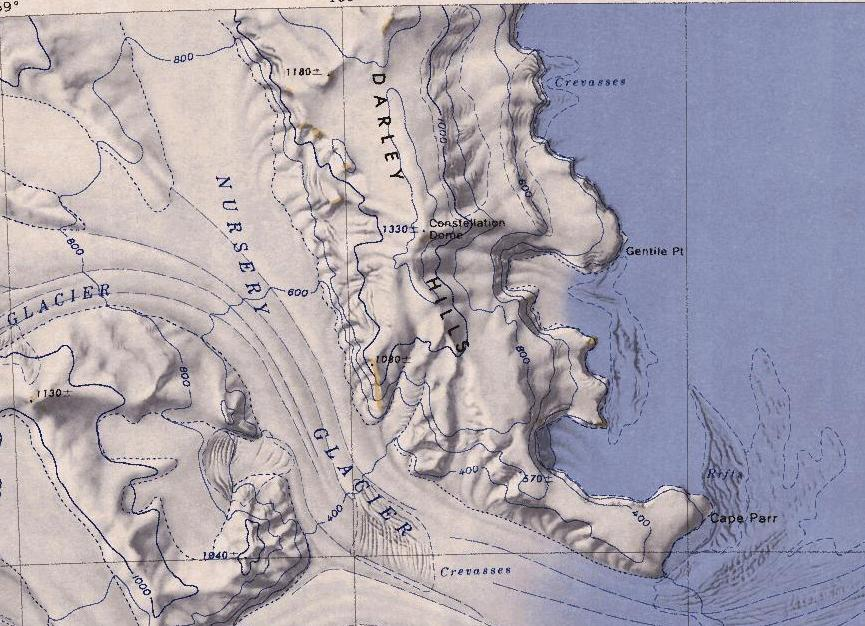
1:250,000 scale topographic maps of the Darley Hills

Geographical features from north to south include:

=== Skinner Saddle ===
80°58′S 159°25′E. A high, broad, snow-covered saddle between the northern part of Darley Hills and that portion of Churchill Mountains eastward of Mount Durnford. Mapped by the Northern Party of NZGSAE (1960–61) and named for D.N. Skinner, geologist with the party.

=== Riddiford Nunatak ===
80°59′S 159°48′E) A small but conspicuous nunatak (c.1200 m) with an adjoining lower outcrop, lying 2.5 nautical miles (4.6 km) west-northwest of Abercrombie Crests in Darley Hills, Churchill Mountains. Named by Advisory Committee on Antarctic Names (US-ACAN) after Charles E. Riddiford, National Geographic cartographer/typographer, about 1923–58; his drawings illustrate the NGM monograph The Round Earth on Flat Paper, 1947.

=== Abercrombie Crests ===
81°0′S 160°9′E. A cluster of rock summits rising to 1,259 metres (4,130 ft) in the north part of Darley Hills, Churchill Mountains, 9 miles (14 km) south-southeast of Mount Deleon. Named by Advisory Committee on Antarctic Names (US-ACAN) after Thomas J. Abercrombie of National Geographic Foreign Editorial Staff, 1957–90, who was on assignment in Antarctica, 1957–58.

=== Chamberlin Rampart ===
81°3′S 159°53′E). A a series of ice-covered bluffs midway along the west slope of the Darley Hills, in the Churchill Mountains. The bluffs rise to 1,200 metres (3,900 ft) and are interspaced by heavily crevassed ice. The feature was named by the Advisory Committee on Antarctic Names after Wellman Chamberlin, a National Geographic cartographer, from about 1935 to 1970, and author of the NGM monograph The Round Earth on Flat Paper, 1947.

=== Constellation Dome ===
81°06′S 160°13′E. An ice-covered prominence, 1,330 metres (4,360 ft) high, the highest feature in the Darley Hills, standing 5 miles (8.0 km) west of Gentile Point, between the Ross Ice Shelf and Nursery Glacier. So named by the Northern Party of the NZGSAE (1960–61) because it was here that the party carried out the first astro fix of the journey.

=== Gentile Point ===
81°07′S 160°48′E. A rounded, ice-covered point 7 miles (11 km) north of Cape Parr, extending seaward from Darley Hills on the west side of Ross Ice Shelf. Named by US-ACAN for Peter A. Gentile, Master of USNS Alatna in USN OpDFrz 1961, and of USNS Chattahoochee which made four fuel-carrying trips between New Zealand and McMurdo Sound in USN OpDFrz 1963.

=== Fisher Point ===
81°9′S 160°43′E A rock coastal point on the east margin of the Darley Hills, in the Churchill Mountains of Antarctica. The point marks the south side of the mouth of ice-filled Grazzini Bay at the Ross Ice Shelf. It was named by the Advisory Committee on Antarctic Names after Franklin L. Fisher, Chief of the Illustrations Division, National Geographic, about 1905–49.

=== Grazzini Bay ===
81°8′S 160°38′E An ice-filled coastal embayment, 2 nautical miles (4 km), between Gentile Point and Fisher Point on the east side of the Darley Hills, in the Churchill Mountains of Antarctica. The bay opens to the Ross Ice Shelf. It was named by the Advisory Committee on Antarctic Names after Athos D. Grazzini, a cartographer and toponymic specialist on the National Geographic staff from about 1950–70.

=== Boyer Bluff ===
81°10′S 160°5′E. A a mostly ice-covered bluff, 1,080 metres (3,540 ft) high, at the southwest periphery of the Darley Hills in the Churchill Mountains. The feature is 4 nautical miles (7 km) southwest of Constellation Dome. It was named by the Advisory Committee on Antarctic Names after David S. Boyer of the National Geographic Foreign Editorial Staff, who was on assignment in Antarctica, 1956–57. This is just one of several features in the Darley Hills that are named for NGM staff.

=== Nursery Glacier ===
81°16′S 160°30′E. Glacier about 20 miles (32 km) long, flowing southeast along the west side of Darley Hills to enter Ross Ice Shelf just south of Cape Parr. So named by the NZGSAE (1959–60) because it was on this glacier that a litter of husky pups was born.

== Sources ==
- "Abercrombie Crests", Geographic Names Information System, United States Geological Survey, United States Department of the Interior
- Alberts, Fred G., ed. (1995), Geographic Names of the Antarctic (PDF) (2 ed.), United States Board on Geographic Names This article incorporates public domain material from websites or documents of the United States Board on Geographic Names.
- "Boyer Bluff", Geographic Names Information System, United States Geological Survey, United States Department of the Interior
- Cape Selborne, USGS United States Geologic Survey, 1960
- "Chamberlin Rampart", Geographic Names Information System, United States Geological Survey, United States Department of the Interior
- "Fisher Point", Geographic Names Information System, United States Geological Survey, United States Department of the Interior
- "Grazzini Bay", Geographic Names Information System, United States Geological Survey, United States Department of the Interior
- Mount Nares, USGS United States Geologic Survey, 1960
- Riddiford Nunatak, AADC Australian Antarctic Data Centre
- This article incorporates public domain material from websites or documents of the United States Geological Survey.
