= Mercury Glacier (Cook Mountains) =

Glacier in the Cook Mountains, Antarctica

Mercury Glacier (79°34′S 157°17′E) is a wide glacier flowing south from the slopes of Mount Hughes in the Cook Mountains of Antarctica. It was named by the New Zealand Antarctic Place-Names Committee after Mercury, a god in Greek mythology, in association with other names in this area.
