= Wilson Hills =

Group of hills in Antarctica

- Location within Antarctica

Highest point
- Coordinates: 69°40′S 158°30′E

Geography
- Continent: Antarctica
- Parent range: Transantarctic Mountains

Wilson Hills (69°40′S 158°30′E) is a group of scattered hills, nunataks and ridges that extend northwest–southeast about 70 nautical miles (130 km; 81 mi) between Matusevich Glacier and Pryor Glacier in Antarctica.

== Discovery and naming ==
The Wilson Hills were discovered by Lieutenant Harry Pennell, Royal Navy, on the Terra Nova Expedition in February 1911 during Robert Falcon Scott's last expedition. They were named after Edward Adrian Wilson, a zoologist with the expedition, who perished with Scott on the return journey from the South Pole.

== Location ==
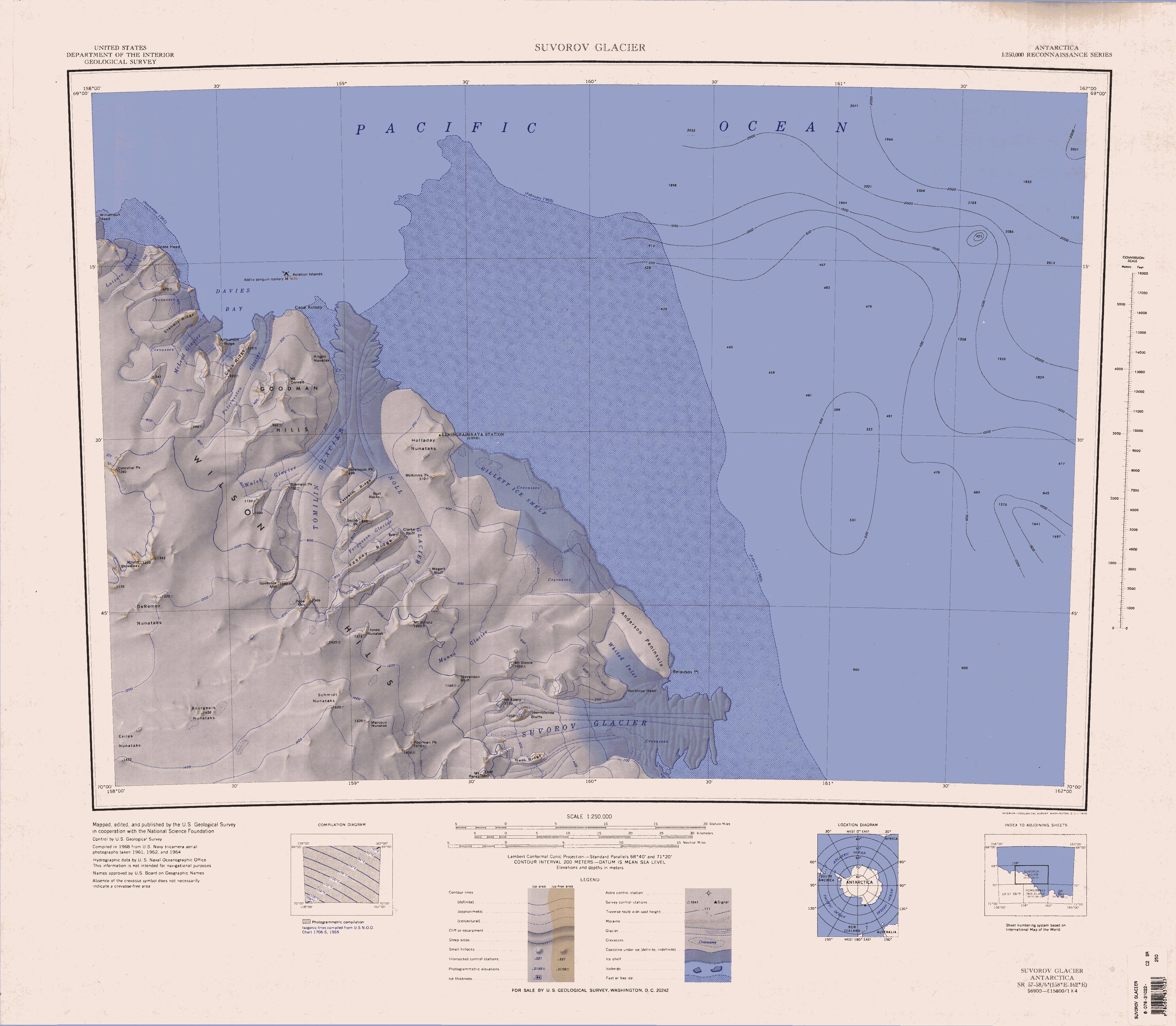
Wilson Hills along the coast

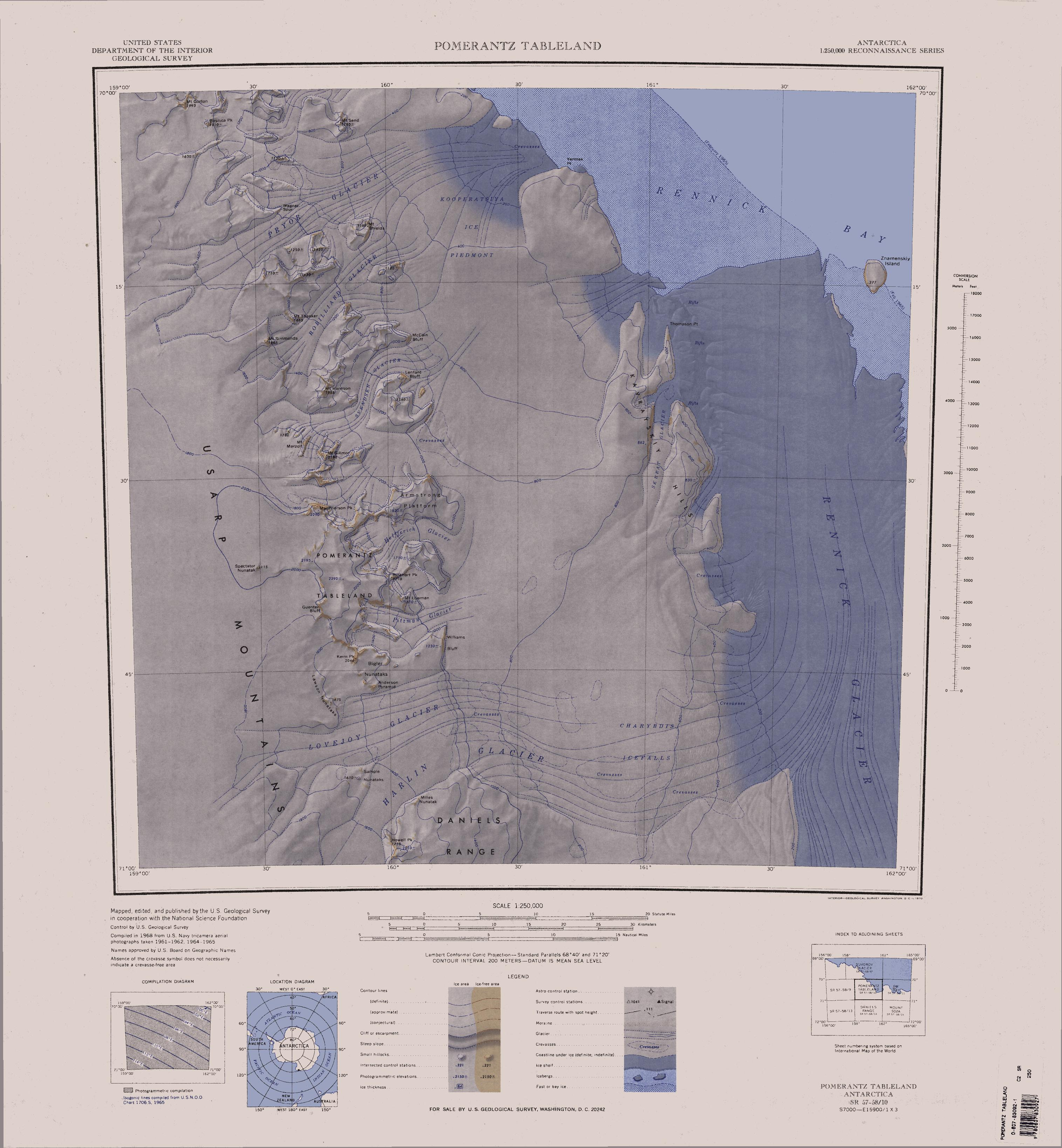
South end of Wilson Hills in the northwest

Features of the Wilson Hills along the east of the Matusevich Glacier include, from south to north, Mount Dalton, Thompson Peak, Ringgold Knoll and Mount Archer. Other inland features include, from northwest to southeast, Celestial Peak, Governor Mountain, Pope Mountain, Jones Nunatak, Mount Schutz, Stevenson Bluff, Mount Steele, Mount Ellery, Poorman Peak and Mount Perez. Features of the extreme south include Mount Gorton, Basilica Peak and Mount Send. Scattered peaks and nunataks further inland include Mount Blowaway, DeRemer Nunataks, Exiles Nunataks, Bourgeois Nunataks, Schmidt Nunataks and Marcoux Nunatak.

Coastal features between Wilson Hills and the Southern Ocean include, from northwest to southeast, Williamson Head, Laizure Glacier, Davies Bay, Goodman Hills, Walsh Glacier, which joins Tomilin Glacier from the north of Schmehl Peak, and Noll Glacier, which joins Tomlin Glacier from the south. Coastal features to the east and south of Noll Glacier include Holladay Nunataks, home to Leningradskaya Station, the Gillett Ice Shelf, Manna Glacier, the Anderson Peninsula, Whited Inlet, Belousov Point, Northrup Head and the Suvorov Glacier. The southern end of the hills extends to Pryor Glacier.

== Inland features ==
=== Mount Dalton ===
69°29′S 157°54′E. A peak 1,175 metres (3,855 ft) high on the east side of Matusevich Glacier, 6 nautical miles (11 km; 6.9 mi) southeast of Thompson Peak, in the northwest part of Wilson Hills. Sketched and photographed by Phillip Law on February 20, 1959, during the Australian National Antarctic Research Expedition (ANARE) (Magga Dan) expedition. Named by Antarctic Names Committee of Australia (ANCA) for R.F.M. Dalton, Technical Officer (aircraft) of the Antarctic Division and second-in-charge of this expedition.

=== Thompson Peak ===
69°25′S 157°40′E. A peak, 980 metres (3,220 ft) high, 5 nautical miles (9.3 km; 5.8 mi) south of Ringgold Knoll in the northwest end of Wilson Hills. Plotted by ANARE from aerial photographs taken by United States Navy Operation Highjump (1946–47) and ANARE (1959). Named by ANCA for R.H.J. Thompson, Administrative Officer of the Antarctic Division, Melbourne, second-in-command of several ANARE expeditions to the Antarctic.

=== Ringgold Knoll ===
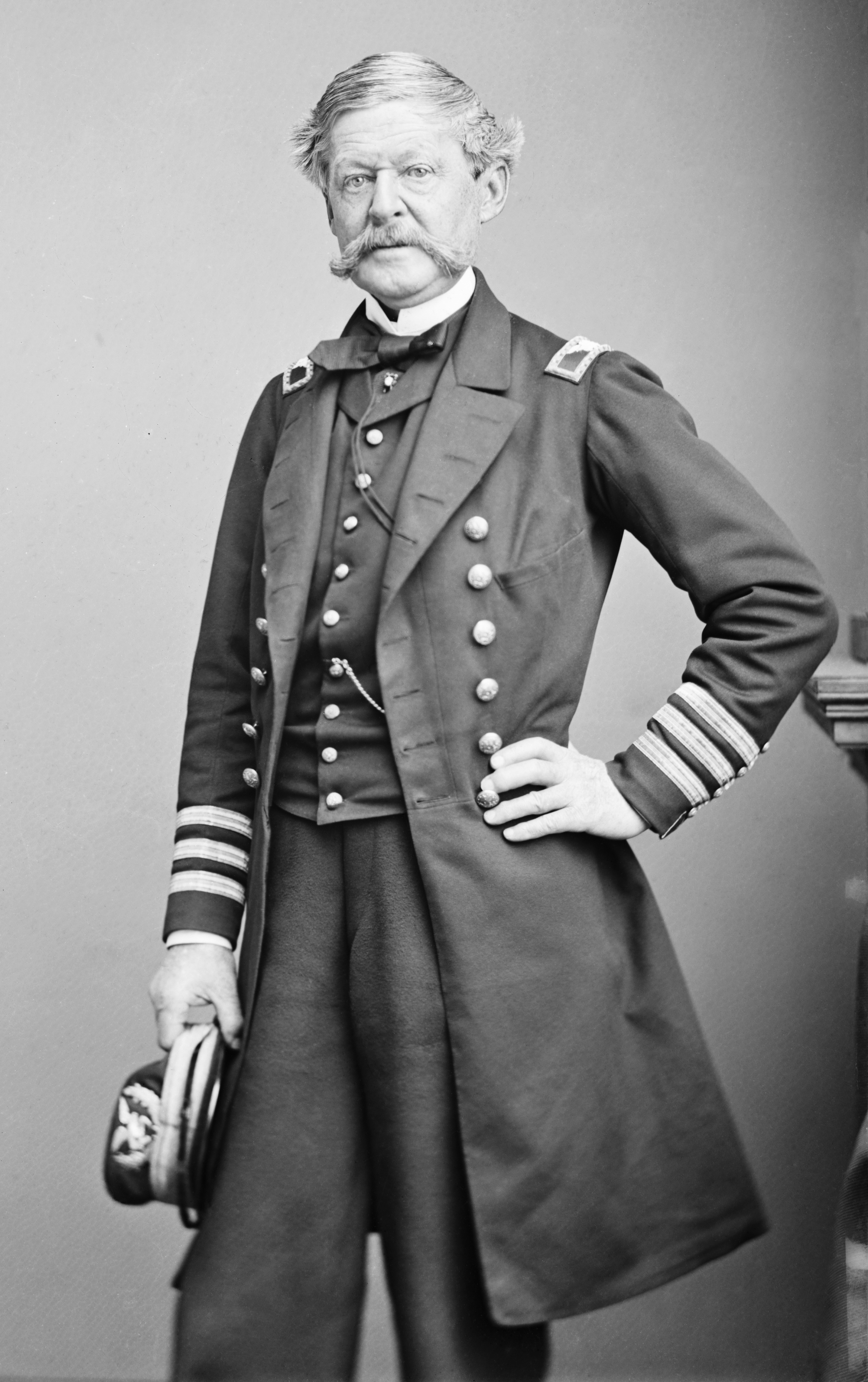
Cadwalader Ringgold

69°20′S 157°39′E. A mountain 9 nautical miles (17 km; 10 mi) south of Archer Point on the east side of Matusevich Glacier. On January 16, 1840, Lieutenant-Commandant Cadwalader Ringgold on the Porpoise, one of the ships of the USEE (1838–42) under Wilkes, sighted a large dark mountain in this direction. It was named Ringgold's Knoll on the chart by Wilkes. In 1959 Phillip Law of ANARE made an investigation of features in the area. It was not possible to identify the feature sighted by Ringgold, but this mountain is in proper relationship to nearby Reynolds Peak and Eld Peak as indicated on Wilkes' chart. It was selected by Law of ANARE to perpetuate Wilkes' naming.

=== Mount Archer ===
69°12′S 157°39′E. A rock peak immediately south of Archer Point on the west side of Harald Bay. The peak was mapped from air photos taken in February 1959 by the ANARE (Magga Dan) led by Phillip Law. Named after Archer Point.

=== Celestial Peak ===
69°33′S 158°03′E. A granite peak, 1,280 metres (4,200 ft) high, 8 nautical miles (15 km; 9.2 mi) north of Mount Blowaway. First mapped by the United States Geological Survey (USGS) Topo West survey party, 1962-63. Named by the northern party of New Zealand Geological Survey Antarctic Expedition (NZGSAE), 1963–64, which occupied the peak as a survey and gravity station. So named by NZGSAE because the party's first observations of stars were made nearby.

=== Governor Mountain ===
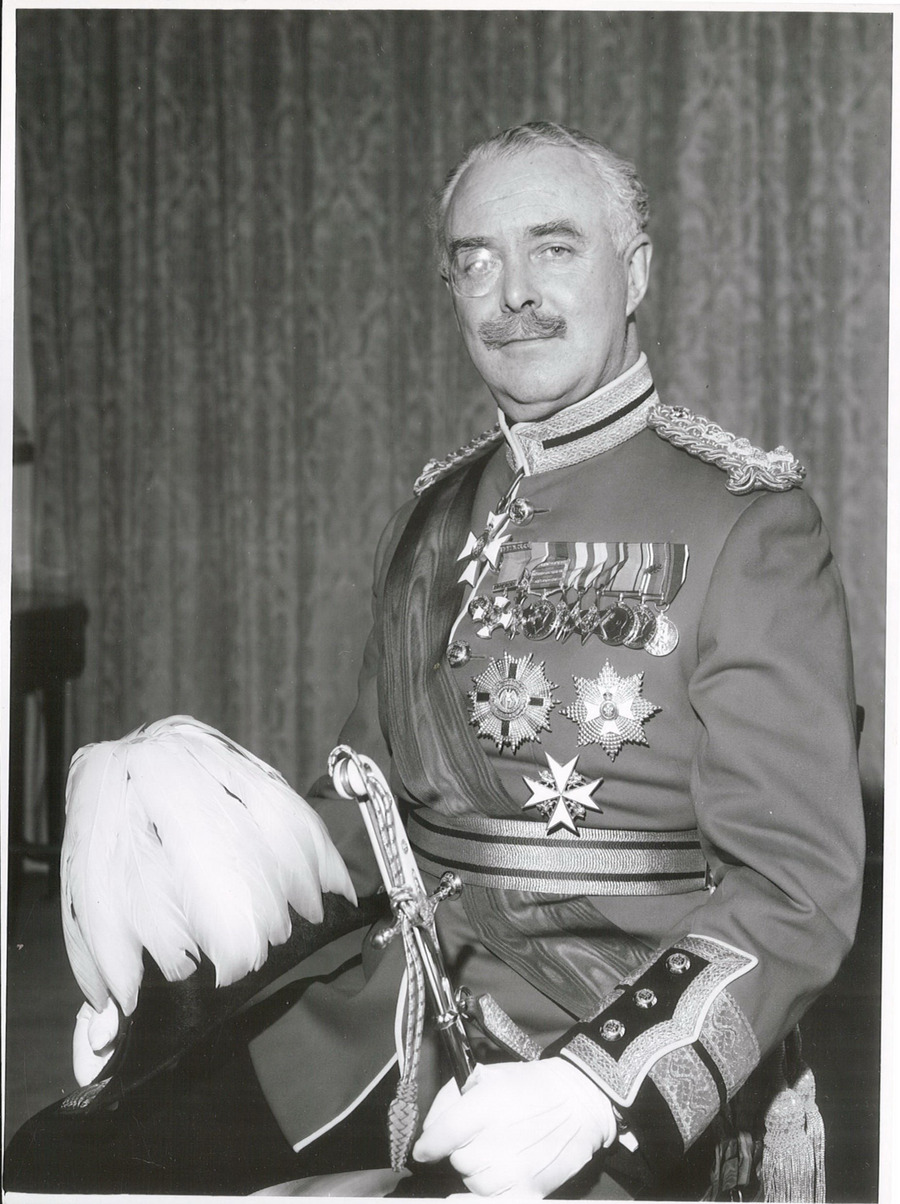
Bernard Fergusson

69°43′S 158°43′E. A mainly ice-free mountain 1,550 metres (5,090 ft) high at the west side of the head of Tomilin Glacier. Mapped by the USGS Topo West party, 1962-63. The mountain was occupied as a survey station by the Northern Party of the NZGSAE, 1963–64, which named it for Sir Bernard Fergusson, Governor-General of New Zealand, and because of the dominating aspect of this feature.

=== Pope Mountain ===
69°44′S 158°50′E. A largely ice-free mountain 1,345 metres (4,413 ft) high rising directly at the head of Tomilin Glacier, 3 nautical miles (5.6 km; 3.5 mi) southeast of Governor Mountain. Mapped by USGS from surveys and United States Navy air photos, 1960-63. Named by US-ACAN for Lieutenant Thomas J. Pope, United States Navy Reserve, Navigator in LC-130F Hercules aircraft during Operation Deep Freeze, 1968.

=== Jones Nunatak ===
69°47′S 159°04′E. A nunatak at the head of Noll Glacier, 4 nautical miles (7.4 km; 4.6 mi) west of Mount Schutz. Mapped by USGS from surveys and United States Navy air photos, 1960-63. Named by the United States Advisory Committee on Antarctic Names (US-ACAN) for Frank E. Jones, Aviation Boatswain's Mate of United States Navy Squadron VX-6, a member of the aircraft ground handling crew at Williams Field, McMurdo Sound, during Operation Deep Freeze 1967 and 1968.

=== Mount Schutz ===
69°46′S 159°16′E. A mountain 1,260 metres (4,130 ft) high rising at the east side of the head of Noll Glacier. Mapped by USGS from surveys and United States Navy, air photos, 1960-63. Named by US-ACAN for Lieutenant Commander Albert C. Schutz, Jr., United States Navy, Aircraft Commander in LC-117D and Co-pilot in LC-130F aircraft during Operation Deep Freeze 1967 and 1968.

=== Stevenson Bluff ===
69°51′S 159°28′E. A bluff 4 nautical miles (7.4 km; 4.6 mi) northwest of Mount Ellery. The bluff forms a portion of the divide between the Manna and Suvorov Glaciers. Mapped by USGS from surveys and United States Navy air photos, 1960-63. Named by US-ACAN for William P. Stevenson, Aviation Machinist's Mate of United States Navy Squadron VX-6, a helicopter crew-member at McMurdo Station during 1968.

=== Mount Steele ===
69°50′S 159°40′E. A mountain, 1,050 metres (3,440 ft) high, situated 4.5 nautical miles (8.3 km; 5.2 mi) east-northeast of Stevenson Bluff on the divide between Suvorov Glacier and Manna Glacier. Mapped by USGS from surveys and United States Navy air photos, 1960-63. Named by US-ACAN for Carlett D. Steele, Chief Aviation Machinist's Mate of Squadron VX-6. Steele participated in several Deep Freeze operations between 1957 and 1968 as helicopter crewmember and maintenance supervisor.

=== Mount Ellery ===
69°53′S 159°38′E. A mountain 1,110 metres (3,640 ft) high near the head of Suvorov Glacier, 2 nautical miles (3.7 km; 2.3 mi) northwest of Hornblende Bluffs. The region was photographed by United States Navy Operation Highjump, 1946-47. The position of the mountain was fixed on February 21, 1962 by Syd L. Kirkby, surveyor with the ANARE Thala Dan cruise led by Phillip Law. Named for R.L.J. Ellery, a member of the Australian Antarctic Exploration Committee of 1886.

=== Poorman Peak ===
69°57′S 159°15′E. A rock peak 1,610 metres (5,280 ft) high near the head of Suvorov Glacier, 9 nautical miles (17 km; 10 mi) west-southwest of Mount Ellery. Mapped by USGS from surveys and United States Navy air photos, 1960-63. Named by US-ACAN for Dean A. Poorman, ADJ1, United States Navy, Aviation Machinist's Mate with Squadron VX-6 at McMurdo Station, 1967.

=== Mount Perez ===
70°00′S 159°32′E. A mountain 1,610 metres (5,280 ft) high at the south side of the upper reaches of Suvorov Glacier, 6 nautical miles (11 km; 6.9 mi) southwest of Hornblende Bluffs. Named by US-ACAN for Manuel J. Perez, Photographer's Mate, United States Navy member of the USGS Topo West survey party that established geodetic control for features between Cape Adare and the Wilson Hills during 1962-63.

=== Mount Gorton ===
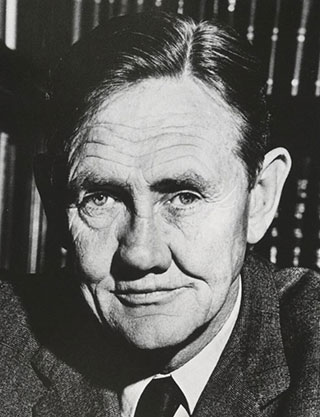
John Gorton

70°01′S 159°15′E. A prominent mountain 1,995 metres (6,545 ft) high located 6 nautical miles (11 km; 6.9 mi) west-southwest of Mount Perez in southern Wilson Hills. Photographed by United States Navy Operation Highjump, 1946-47. The mountain was sighted in 1961 by Phillip Law of ANARE and was positioned by observations from the ship Magga Dan. Named by ANCA after Senator J.G. Gorton, Australian Minister for the Navy at that time.

=== Basilica Peak ===
70°02′S 159°20′E. A granite peak 1,810 metres (5,940 ft) high located 2.5 nautical miles (4.6 km; 2.9 mi) southeast of Mount Gorton in the south part of Wilson Hills. Mapped by USGS (1962–63) and NZGSAE (1963–64). Named by NZGSAE because of its shape.

=== Mount Send ===
70°02′S 159°49′E. A mountain 1,180 metres (3,870 ft) high on the north flank of Pryor Glacier, 10 nautical miles (19 km; 12 mi) east of Basilica Peak, in southern Wilson Hills. Mapped by USGS from surveys and United States Navy air photos, 1960-62. Named by US-ACAN for Raymond F. Send, USARP geophysicist at McMurdo Station, 1967-68.

== Western features ==
Scattered peaks and nunataks further inland in the Wilson Hills include Mount Blowaway, DeRemer Nunataks, Exiles Nunataks, Bourgeois Nunataks, Schmidt Nunataks and Marcoux Nunatak.

=== Mount Blowaway ===
69°41′S 158°09′E. A gneissic mountain 1,320 metres (4,330 ft) high with extensive areas of exposed rock, located 12 nautical miles (22 km; 14 mi) west-northwest of Governor Mountain. So named by the northern party of the NZGSAE, 1963–64, because three members of the party were forced by a blizzard to abandon their proposed survey and gravity station there.

=== DeRemer Nunataks ===
69°45′S 158°09′E. A group of nunataks centered about 4 nautical miles (7.4 km; 4.6 mi) southeast of Mount Blowaway. Mapped by USGS from surveys and United States Navy aerial photographs, 1960-63. Named by US-ACAN for Yeoman First Class Dennis L. DeRemer, United States Navy, who served with the United States Naval Support Force, Antarctica, February 1967 to July 1970.

=== Exiles Nunataks ===
69°57′S 158°03′E. A cluster of small nunataks 8 nautical miles (15 km; 9.2 mi) south-southwest of DeRemer Nunataks. Mapped by USGS from surveys and United States Navy air photos, 1960-63. So named by the northern party of the NZGSAE, 1963–64, because of their isolated position.

=== Bourgeois Nunataks ===
69°54′S 158°22′E. A group of nunataks 12 nautical miles (22 km; 14 mi) southwest of Governor Mountain. Mapped by USGS from surveys and United States Navy air photos, 1960-63. Named by US-ACAN for William L. Bourgeois, Chief Aviation Machinist's Mate, United States Navy, flight engineer on LC-130 Hercules aircraft during Operation Deep Freeze 1967 and 1968.

=== Schmidt Nunataks ===
69°53′S 158°56′E. A cluster of nunataks 11 nautical miles (20 km; 13 mi) southeast of Governor Mountain. Mapped by USGS from surveys and United States Navy air photos, 1960-63. Named by US-ACAN for James L. Schmidt, AE2, United States Navy, Aviation Electrician's Mate of Squadron VX-6 and a member of the winter-over party at McMurdo Station, 1967.

=== Marcoux Nunatak ===
69°55′S 159°04′E. A nunatak 1,530 metres (5,020 ft) high about midway between Schmidt Nunataks and Poorman Peak. It stands above the ice near the head of Manna Glacier. Mapped by USGS from surveys and United States Navy air photos, 1960-63. Named by US-ACAN for John S. Marcoux, United States Navy, aviation structural mechanic with Squadron VX-6, who wintered at McMurdo Station in 1967.

== Coastal features ==
=== Laizure Glacier ===
69°15′S 158°07′E. A broad glacier that enters the sea immediately west of Drake Head, Gates Coast. The glacier was roughly plotted by Australia from United States Navy Operation Highjump photography, 1946–47, and from photographs and other data obtained by ANARE, 1959-62. It was mapped in detail by USGS from surveys and United States Navy photography, 1960-64. Named by US-ACAN for Lieutenant (j.g.) David H. Laizure, United States Navy, navigator on LC-130 aircraft during Operation Deep Freeze 1968.

=== Holladay Nunataks ===
69°31′S 159°19′E. A cluster of nunataks 3 nautical miles (5.6 km; 3.5 mi) in extent, occupying the central part of the peninsula between the terminus of Tomilin Glacier and the Gillett Ice Shelf. Mapped by USGS from surveys and United States Navy air photos, 1960-63. Named by US-ACAN for Billy W. Holladay, Chief Aviation Electronics Technician, United States Navy, who was Maintenance Control Chief at McMurdo Station during Operation Deep Freeze, 1968.

=== McKinnis Peak ===
69°34′S 159°21′E. A peak, (510 metres (1,670 ft) high, 2 nautical miles (3.7 km; 2.3 mi) southeast of Holladay Nunataks. It surmounts the peninsula that is bounded by Tomilin and Noll Glaciers on the west and Gillett Ice Shelf on the east. Mapped by USGS from surveys and United States Navy air photos, 1960-63. Named by US-ACAN for Joe D. McKinnis of United States Navy Squadron VX-6, Aviation Electronics Technician and air crewman on LC-130F aircraft in five Operation Deep Freeze deployments through 1969.

=== Gillett Ice Shelf ===
69°35′S 159°42′E. A narrow ice shelf occupying an indentation of the coast off the Wilson Hills between the peninsula containing the Holladay Nunataks and the Anderson Peninsula. Mapped by USGS from surveys and United States Navy air photos, 1960-63. Named by US-ACAN for Capt. Clarence R. Gillett, USCG, who served on the USCGC Burton Island and participated in several Deep Freeze operations, December 1966 to May 1970.

=== Manna Glacier ===
69°45′S 159°40′E. A broad depression glacier located north of Stevenson Bluff and Mount Steele. It drains NE into the east part of Gillett Ice Shelf. So named by the northern party of NZGSAE, 1963–64, because of an airdrop of extra comforts from an aircraft which carried the Governor-General of New Zealand over this area.

== Sources ==
- Alberts, Fred G., ed. (1995), Geographic Names of the Antarctic (PDF) (2 ed.), United States Board on Geographic Names This article incorporates public domain material from websites or documents of the United States Board on Geographic Names.
- Pomerantz Tableland, USGS: United States Geological Survey, 1968
- SR 57-58 2023 Edition Map Catalogue No.15582 (PDF), Australian Antarctic Division, 2023, ISBN 978-1-876934-48-4
- Suvorov Glacier, USGS: United States Geological Survey, 1968

This article incorporates public domain material from websites or documents of the United States Geological Survey.
