= Nursery Glacier =

Glacier in Antarctica

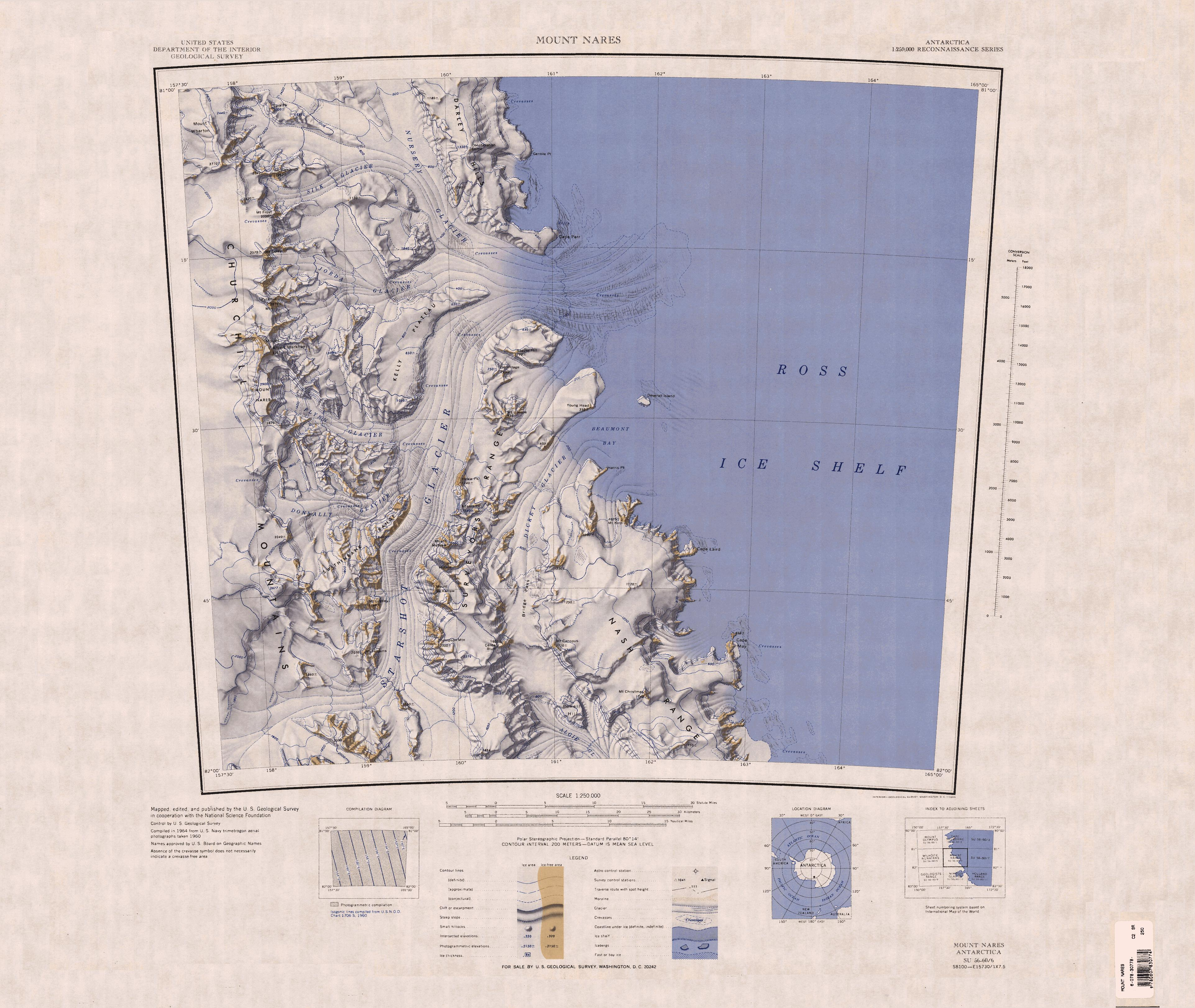
- Mpunt Nares region. Nursery Glacier to the northwest

- Location within Antarctica
- Coordinates: 81°16′S 160°30′E
- Terminus: Ross Ice Shelf

Nursery Glacier (81°16′S 160°30′E) is a coastal glacier in the Churchill Mountains of Antarctica.

== Location ==
The glacier is about 20 nautical miles (37 km) long. It flows southeast along the west side of Darley Hills to enter Ross Ice Shelf just south of Cape Parr. It is joined from the west by the Silk Glacier in its upper reaches and the Jorda Glacier near its mouth. It merges with the larger Starshot Glacier coming from the south as it enters the ice shelf. The New Zealand Geological Survey Antarctic Expedition (NZGSAE) (1959–60) named it Nursery Glacier because it was on this glacier that a litter of husky pups was born.

== Tributaries ==
=== Jorda Glacier ===
81°18′S 159°49′E. A glacier, about 15 miles (24 km) long that drains the east slopes of the Churchill Mountains between Mount Coley and Pyramid Mountain and merges with the lower Nursery Glacier just before the latter enters the Ross Ice Shelf. Named by US-ACAN for Lt. Cdr. Henry P. Jorda, USN, pilot with Squadron VX-6 during USN OpDFrz I, 1955-56.

=== Lee Glacier ===
81°15′S 159°7′E. A glacier flowing southeast into Jorda Glacier. Mount Frost and Mount Coley are located at its head. The glacier was named in honor of Sandra Lee, a former New Zealand Minister of Conservation, for her contribution to environmental protection in Antarctica and its surrounding waters.

=== Bally Glacier ===
81°22′S 159°12′E. A glacier 6 nautical miles (11 km) long which occupies the central part of the Carlstrom Foothills. It flows north along the east side of Mount Blick into Jorda Glacier. It was named by the Advisory Committee on Antarctic Names after John Bally of the University of Colorado Center for Astrophysics and Space Astronomy, Boulder, Colorado; he was a United States Antarctic Program principal investigator and field team member of the Advanced Telescope Project, South Pole Center for Astrophysical Research in Antarctica, 1992–95.

=== Silk Glacier ===
81°09′S 158°55′E. A glacier, 10 miles (16 km) long, draining the east slopes of the Churchill Mountains between Mount Frost and Mount Zinkovich to enter Nursery Glacier. Named by US-ACAN for Cdt. P.R.H. Silk, RNZN, commanding officer of HMNZS Endeavour II in Antarctic waters, 1963-64.

=== McLay Glacier ===
81°2′S 158°49′E. A glacier flowing southeast into Nursery Glacier. Mount Durnford, Mount Stewart and Mount Liard flank the north and Turk Peak and Bradshaw Peak flank the south. It was named in honor of the Honourable Sir James Kenneth McLay, KNZM QSO, who was the former Minister of Justice, Attorney-General and Deputy Prime Minister of New Zealand. He held the position of New Zealand's Whaling Commissioner for 9 years, during which time he fought for the Southern Ocean Whale Sanctuary, and opposed scientific whaling.

== Sources ==
- Alberts, Fred G., ed. (1995), Geographic Names of the Antarctic (PDF) (2 ed.), United States Board on Geographic Names This article incorporates public domain material from websites or documents of the United States Board on Geographic Names.
- "Bally Glacier", Geographic Names Information System, United States Geological Survey, United States Department of the Interior
- "Lee Glacier", Geographic Names Information System, United States Geological Survey, United States Department of the Interior
- "McLay Glacier", Geographic Names Information System, United States Geological Survey, United States Department of the Interior
- Mount Nares, USGS
