= Mount Archer, Queensland =

Mount Archer may refer to:

- Mount Archer, Queensland (Rockhampton Region) is a mountain and place in Central Queensland, Australia.
- Mount Archer, Queensland (Somerset Region) is a mountain and place in South-East Queensland, Australia.
- Mount Archer National Park is a national park in Central Queensland, Australia.
