= Graeme Blick =

New Zealand geodesist

Graeme Blick CNZM
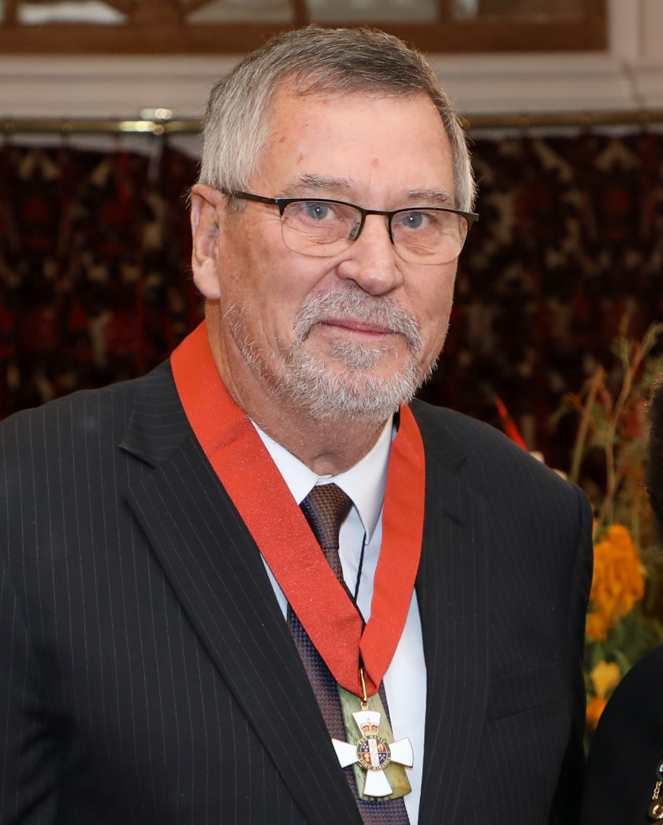
- Blick in 2025
- Born: Graeme Hilton Blick; 1953 (age 72–73)
- Education: University of Otago
- Occupations: Surveyor; geodesist
- Years active: 1969–2020
- Employers: GNS Science; LINZ

Graeme Hilton Blick CNZM (born 1953) is a New Zealand surveyor and photogrammetrist. He was chief geodesist of New Zealand, working for Land Information New Zealand, from 2009 until his retirement in 2024.

== Biography ==
Blick was born in 1953.

Blick graduated from the University of Otago in 1980 with a degree in surveying, and worked for several years at GNS Science focused on measurement of crustal deformation across New Zealand. In 1992/1993 he won a visiting NAVSTAR scientist award to work on plate tectonics, until in 1995 he joined Land Information New Zealand, where he established the Antarctic mapping and charting programme. In 1998, he implemented a new dynamic geodetic system in New Zealand, in 2001 along with GNS Science he established the GeoNet system, and in 2016 he defined the New Zealand height standard. From 2009, he worked as Chief Geodesist of New Zealand; that same year he announced the launch of a new series of topographical maps for the country. In 2022 he supported the deployment of the Southern Positioning Augmentation Network to increase the accuracy of satellite navigation.

From 2013, Blick represented New Zealand at the United Nations Global Geospatial Information Management Committee of Experts. He has been a longstanding member of the Scientific Committee on Antarctic Research, and also chaired the FIG Commission on Reference Frames.

Blick retired from LINZ in 2020.

=== Awards and honours ===
Blick was awarded the Ron Munro Memorial Lifetime Achievement Award in 2024. For services to geodesy, he was appointed a Companion of the New Zealand Order of Merit in the 2025 New Year Honours.

Mount Blick, in the Carlstrom Foothills, Antarctica, was named in honour of Blick by the Advisory Committee on Antarctic Names.

== Selected bibliography ==
- G.H. Blick; B.J. Scott; P.M. Otway (1995). 1995 Taupo Volcanic Zone GPS Project field report. Institute of Geological & Nuclear Sciences. ISBN 0478088752.
- Blick, G.; Crook, C.; Grant, D.; Beavan, J (2005). "Implementation of a Semi-Dynamic Datum for New Zealand". A Window on the Future of Geodesy. International Association of Geodesy Symposia. Vol. 128. Springer, Berlin, Heidelberg. pp. 38–43. doi:10.1007/3-540-27432-4_7. ISBN 3-540-24055-1.
- G.H. Blick (August 2007). Where in the world are we? : a technical guide to datums and projections in New Zealand (PDF). LINZ. ISBN 9780478107548.
