= Pryor Glacier =

Glacier in Antarctica

- Location within Antarctica
- Type: Outlet glacier
- Location: East Antarctica
- Coordinates: 70°5′S 160°10′E
- Terminus: Southern Ocean

Pryor Glacier (70°5′S 160°10′E) is a glacier flowing northeastward, to the north of Mount Shields and Yermak Point, into Rennick Bay. The feature is about 30 nautical miles (56 km; 35 mi) long and forms a physical separation between Wilson Hills and Usarp Mountains.

== Discovery and naming ==
Mapped by United States Geological Survey (USGS) from surveys and United States Navy aerial photographs, 1960–62. Named by the United States Advisory Committee on Antarctic Names (US-ACAN) for Madison E. Pryor, scientific leader at McMurdo Station (1959) and U.S. Exchange Scientist at the Soviet Mirny Station (1962).

== Location ==
The Pryor Glacier originates in the west between the Wilson Hills and the Usarp Mountains and flows north-northeast to enter Rennick Bay to the north of Yermak Point. It passes Wagner Spur and Mount Send to the north. Past Mount Shields it is joined from the southwest by Robilliard Glacier. Svendsen Glacier and Robilliard Glacier feed the Kooperatsiya Ice Piedmont, which joins Pryor Glacier from the south just before its mouth. Features along the Svendsen Glacier and Robilliard Glacier include Mount Simmonds, Mount Theaker, Mount Harrison, McCain Bluff, Mount Gillmor and Lenfant Bluff, all in the Usarp Mountains.

== Features ==
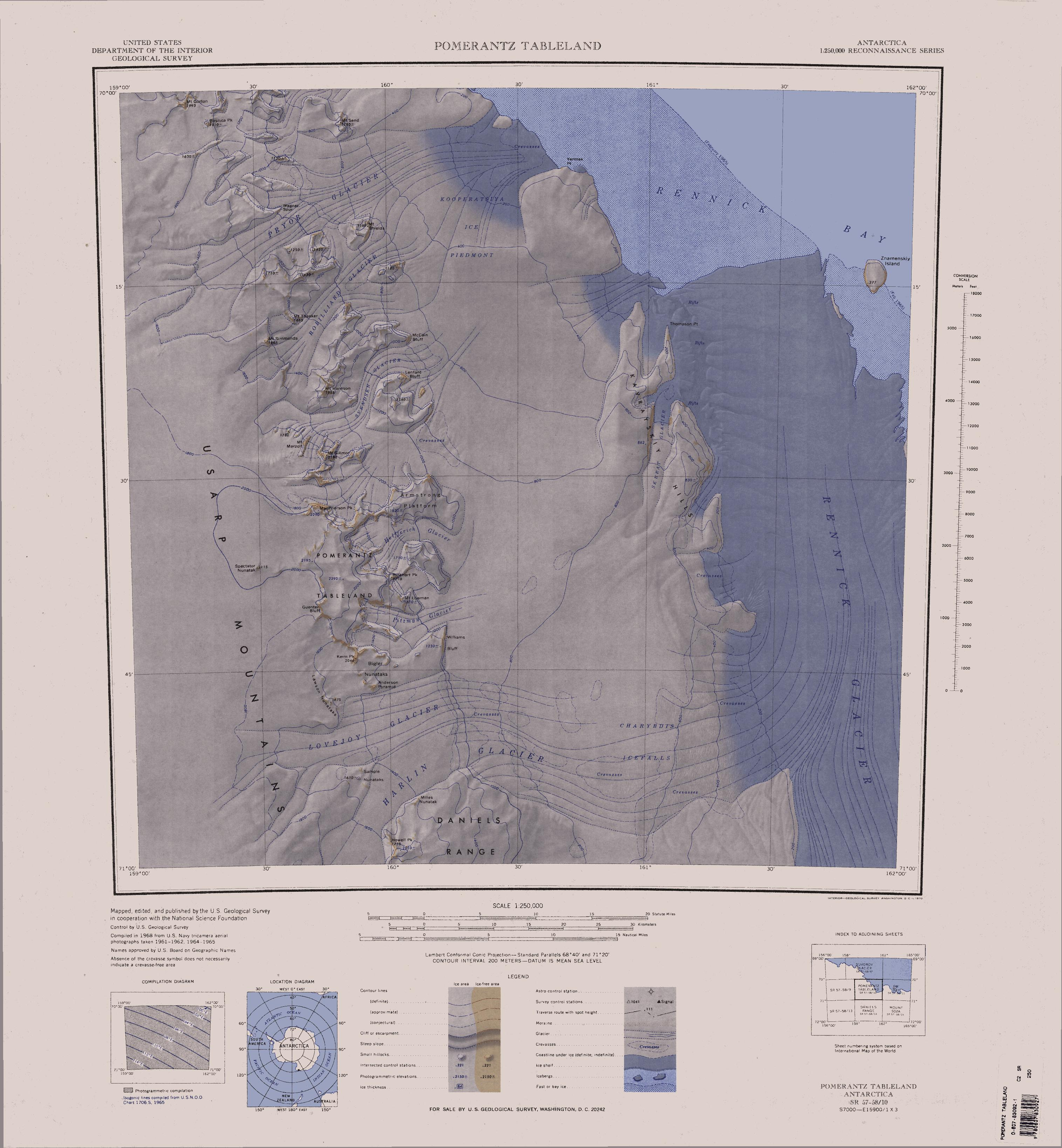
Pryor Glacier in the northwest

=== Wagner Spur ===
70°09′S 159°36′E. A pointed rock and ice spur along the north flank of Pryor Glacier, 11 nautical miles (20 km; 13 mi) southeast of Mount Gorton, at the southeast extremity of Wilson Hills. Mapped by United States Geological Survey (USGS) from surveys and United States Navy aerial photography, 1960–62. Named by United States Advisory Committee on Antarctic Names (US-ACAN) for John E. Wagner, worker in the field of glaciology at McMurdo Station, 1967–68.

=== Robilliard Glacier ===
70°13′S 159°56′E. A valley glacier, 17 nautical miles (31 km; 20 mi) long, which flows northeastward through the Usarp Mountains. It rises southward of Mount Simmonds and emerges from the mountains at Mount Shields, where it joins Kooperatsiya Ice Piedmont. Mapped by USGS from surveys and United States Navy air photos, 1960–62. Named by US-ACAN for Gordon Robilliard, United States Antarctic Research Program (USARP) biologist at McMurdo Station in 1967-68 and 1968–69.

=== Svendsen Glacier ===
70°21′S 160°00′E. A meandering glacier, 13 nautical miles (24 km; 15 mi) long, in the Usarp Mountains. It flows northeastward from Mount Marzolf and emerges between McCain Bluff and Lenfant Bluff onto an ice piedmont just west of the terminus of Rennick Glacier. Mapped by USGS from surveys and United States Navy air photos, 1960–62. Named by US-ACAN for Kendall L. Svendsen, USARP geomagnetist at McMurdo Station, 1967–68.

=== Kooperatsiya Ice Piedmont ===
70°15′S 160°25′E. An ice piedmont at the southwest side of Yermak Point on the west shore of Rennick Bay. This area was photographed in 1958 by the Soviet Antarctic Expedition which gave the name "Zaliv Kooperatsiya" to the western portion of Rennick Bay. The US-ACAN has retained the prior name Rennick Bay. For the sake of historical continuity, the name Kooperatsiya Ice Piedmont has been approved for the feature described. Named after the Kooperatsiya, the expedition ship used by the Soviet Antarctic Expedition in 1958.

== Sources ==
- Alberts, Fred G., ed. (1995), Geographic Names of the Antarctic (PDF) (2 ed.), United States Board on Geographic Names This article incorporates public domain material from websites or documents of the United States Board on Geographic Names.
- Pomerantz Tableland, USGS: United States Geological Survey

This article incorporates public domain material from websites or documents of the United States Geological Survey.
