= Benbrook Glacier =

Glacier in Antarctica

Benbrook Glacier (81°27′S 158°55′E) is a glacier 5 nautical miles (9 km) long in the Churchill Mountains. It flows south-southeast from Egress Peak, Carlstrom Foothills, into the Flynn Glacier. It was named after James R. Benbrook of the Department of Physics, University of Houston, Texas, a United States Antarctic Program team member in balloon-borne investigation of the ionosphere and magnetosphere over the Geographic South Pole, 1985–95.
