= Mount Archer (Antarctica) =

Mountain of Antarctica

Coordinates: 69°11′50″S 157°40′26″E

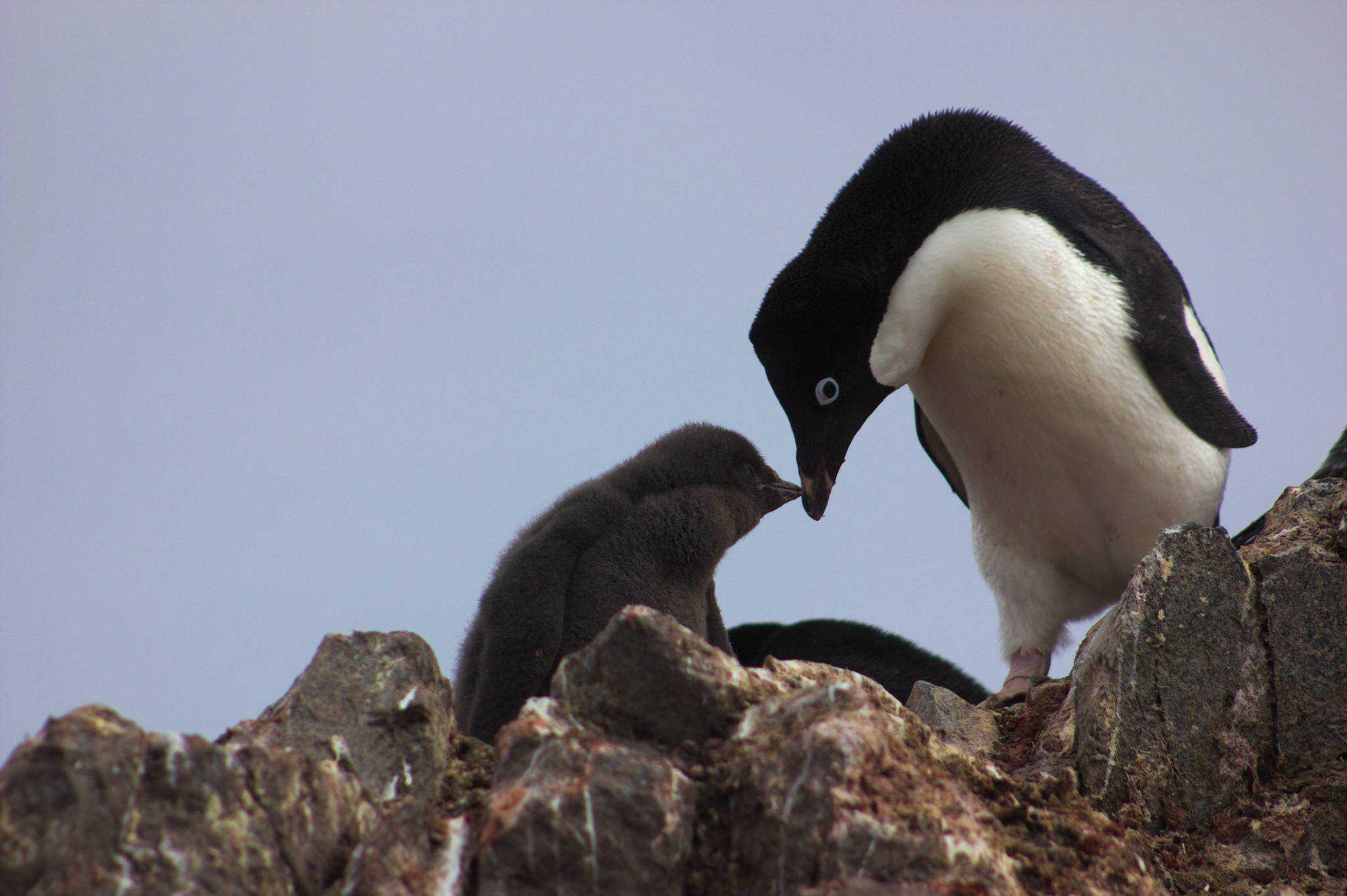
Adélie penguins breed in the IBA

Mount Archer is a rock peak immediately south of Archer Point on the west side of Harald Bay in Antarctica. The peak was mapped from aerial photos taken in February 1959 by the ANARE (Australian National Antarctic Research Expeditions) led by Phillip Law. It is named after Archer Point.

== Important Bird Area ==
A 204 ha site comprising the lower eastern extremity of Mount Archer and the whole of neighbouring Kartografov Island, as well as the intervening marine area, has been designated an Important Bird Area (IBA) by BirdLife International because it supports about 21,000 breeding pairs of Adélie penguins, as estimated by 2012 satellite imagery.
