= Matusevich Glacier =

Glacier in Antarctica

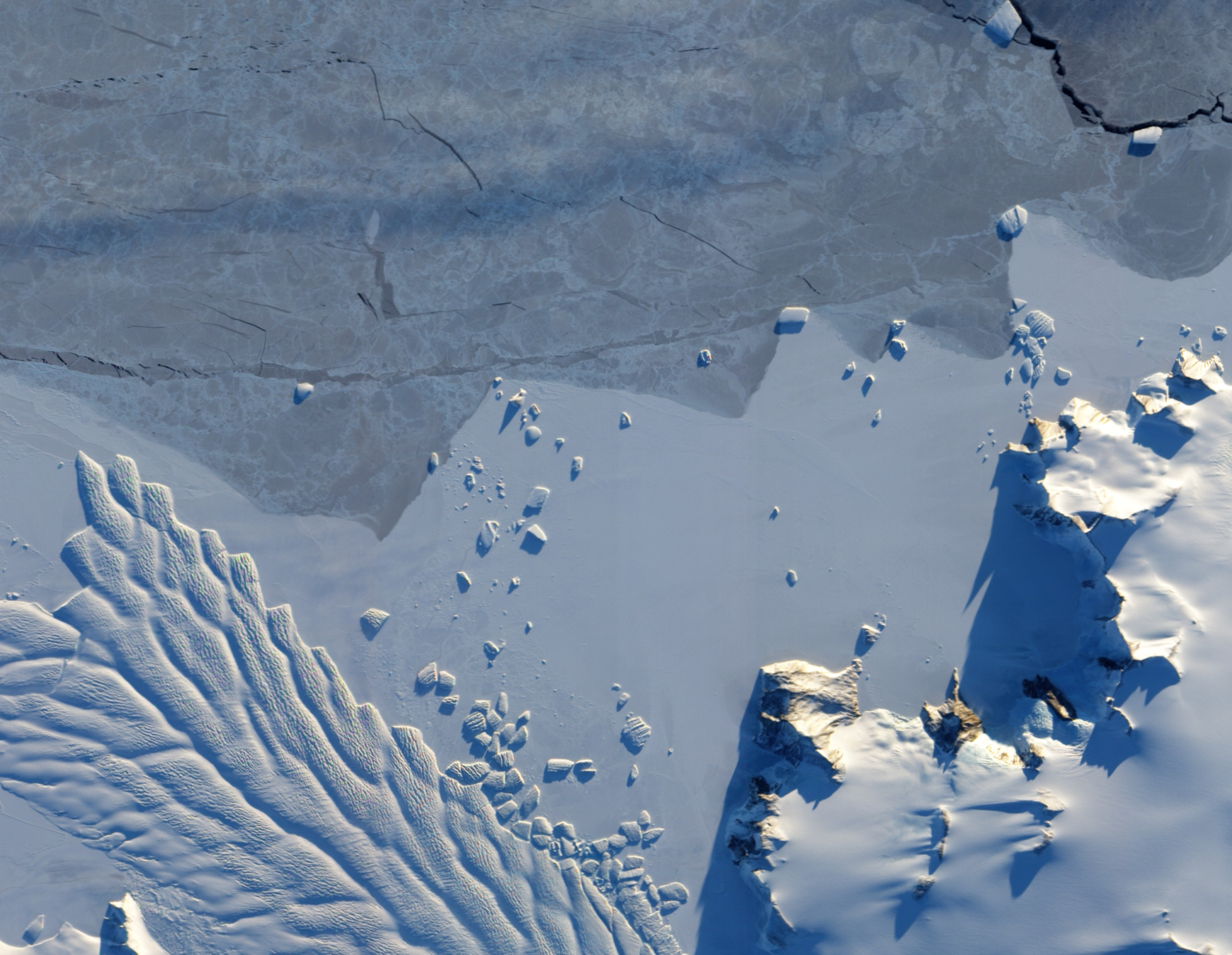
- Natural-colour image of the margin of Matusevich Glacier.

- Location within Antarctica
- Type: Outlet glacier
- Location: East Antarctica
- Coordinates: 69°20′S 157°27′E
- Length: 50 nmi (93 km; 58 mi)
- Terminus: Southern Ocean

Matusevich Glacier (69°20′S 157°27′E) is a broad glacier about 50 nautical miles (93 km; 58 mi) long, with a well developed glacier tongue, flowing to the coast of East Antarctica between the Lazarev Mountains and the northwestern extremity of the Wilson Hills.

== Discovery and naming ==
The region was photographed by U.S. Navy Operation Highjump, 1946–47, the Soviet Antarctic Expedition, 1957–58, and the Australian National Antarctic Research Expeditions, 1959 and 1962. It was named by the Soviet expedition after Nikolai Nikolayevich Matusevich, a Soviet hydrographer and surveyor.

== Glaciology ==
The glacier flows toward the coast of East Antarctica, pushing through a channel between the Lazarev Mountains and the north-western tip of the Wilson terrain. Constrained by surrounding rocks, the river of ice holds together. But stresses resulting from the glacier's movement make deep crevasses, or cracks, in the ice. After passing through the channel, the glacier has room to spread out as it floats on the ocean. The expanded area and the jostling of ocean waves prompts the ice to break apart, which it often does along existing crevasses. Matusevich Glacier does not drain a significant amount of ice off of the Antarctic continent, so the glacier's advances and retreats lack global significance. Like other Antarctic glaciers, however, Matusevich helps glaciologists form a larger picture of Antarctica's glacial health and ice sheet volume.

== Location ==
The Matusevich Glacier runs north to the southern ocean between the Lazerev Mountains and the Wilson Hills. It terminates in the Southern Ocean in a tongue between Lauritzen Bay and Harald Bay. Babushkin Island and the Terra Nova Islands are north of the tongue. Features of the Wilson Hills to the east include, from south to north, Mount Dalton, Thompson Peak, Ringgold Knoll and Mount Archer. Coastal features around Harald Bay to the east include, from west to east, Archer Point, Kartografov Island, Williamson Head. The Laizure Glacier is east of Harold Bay.

== Coastal features ==
=== Matusevich Glacier Tongue ===
69°5′S 157°15′E. A glacier tongue about 18 nautical miles (33 km; 21 mi) long which is the broad seaward extension of the Matusevich Glacier. The Magga Dan, vessel of the ANARE (Australian National Antarctic Research Expeditions) led by Phillip Law, sailed around the tongue, February 21, 1959, at which time the seaward extremity was determined to be floating in 300 fathoms of ocean.

=== Lauritzen Bay ===
69°07′S 156°50′E. A bay about 12 nautical miles (22 km; 14 mi) wide, occupied by bay ice and ice shell, indenting the coast between Cape Yevgenov and Coombes Ridge. The Matusevich Glacier Tongue joins Coombes Ridge in forming the west side of the bay. Photographed from the air by United States Navy Operation Highjump in 1947. Sketched and photographed by Phillip Law, leader of ANARE (Magga Dan) on Feb. 20, 1959. Named by ANCA for Knud Lauritzen, shipowner of Copenhagen, Denmark, owner of Magga Dan and other vessels used by ANARE since 1954.

=== Babushkin Island ===
69°06′S 157°36′E. Small island lying 5.5 nautical miles (10.2 km; 6.3 mi) north of Archer Point and 5 nautical miles (9.3 km; 5.8 mi) east of Matusevich Glacier Tongue. Mapped by the SovAE (1958) and named for Mikhail S. Babushkin (1893-1938), Soviet polar aviator lost in the Arctic.

=== Terra Nova Islands ===
66°53′S 157°57′E. Two small islands lying off the Antarctic coast about 14 nautical miles (26 km; 16 mi) north of Williamson Head. Sighted from the Magga Dan, Mar. 8, 1961, by ANARE under Phillip Law. Named by ANCA after the expedition ship of the BrAE, 1910-13, the Terra Nova, from which Lt. H.L.L. Pennell, RN, discovered and charted coastal points in the vicinity.

=== Harald Bay ===
69°12′S 157°45′E. A bay about 4 nautical miles (7.4 km; 4.6 mi) wide indenting the coast between Archer Point and Williamson Head. Photographed from the air by United States Navy Operation Highjump in 1947. Sketched and photographed by Phillip Law, leader of ANARE (Magga Dan) on Feb. 20, 1959. Named by ANCA for Capt. Harald M011er Pederson, master of the Magga Dan during the expedition.

=== Archer Point ===
69°11′S 157°39′E. A rocky point on the coast marking the west side of Harald Bay. Discovered in Feb. 1911 by Lt. H.L.L. Pennell, RN, in the Terra Nova, expedition ship of the BrAE, 1910-13, under Scott. Named after W.W. Archer, chief steward of the expedition.

=== Kartografov Island ===
69°12′S 157°43′E. A small coastal island lying in the west part of the mouth of Harald Bay. Photographed by United States Navy Operation Highjump (1946-47), the Soviet Antarctic Expedition (1957-58) and ANARE (1959). The island was named Ostrov Kartografov (cartographers' island) by the Soviet expedition.

=== Williamson Head ===
69°11′S 158°00′E. A prominent cape 6 nautical miles (11 km; 6.9 mi) west-northwest of Drake Head on the coast of Antarctica. Discovered from the Terra Nova in February 1911 during Scott's last expedition. Named for Petty Officer Thomas S. Williamson, Royal Navy, a member of the expedition.

== Sources ==
- U. S. Board on Geographic Names; Water Resources Division, U. S. Geological Survey; Defense Mapping Agency; National Science Foundation (1995), Alberts, Fred G. (ed.), "Geographic Names of the Antarctic" (PDF), USGS Report (2 ed.), United States Board on Geographic Names: 3, Bibcode:1995usgs.rept....3U This article incorporates public domain material from websites or documents of the United States Board on Geographic Names.
- Matusevich Glacier, NASA, 7 November 2010
- SR 57-58 2023 Edition Map Catalogue No.15582 (PDF), Australian Antarctic Division, 2023, ISBN 978-1-876934-48-4

This article incorporates public domain material from websites or documents of the United States Geological Survey.
