= Cape Parr =

Cape along the west side of the Ross Ice Shelf, Antarctica

Cape Parr (81°14′S 161°4′E) is a large snow-covered cape along the west side of the Ross Ice Shelf, about 8 nautical miles (15 km) south of Gentile Point. Discovered by the Discovery expedition (1901–04) under Scott, who named it for Admiral Alfred Arthur Chase Parr, one of Scott's advisors who had served in Arctic exploration.
