= Davies Bay =

Bay in Antarctica

- Location within Antarctica
- Coordinates: 69°18′S 158°34′E
- Ocean/sea sources: Southern Ocean

Davies Bay (69°18′S 158°34′E) is a bay on the coast of Antarctica, 10 nautical miles (19 km; 12 mi) wide, between Drake Head and Cape Kinsey.

== Discovery and naming ==
Davies Bay was discovered in February 1911 from the Terra Nova (Lieutenant Harry L.L. Pennell, Royal Navy) of the British Antarctic Expedition, 1910–13. It was named for Francis E. C. Davies, shipwright on the Terra Nova. Davies built the Observation Hill Cross, erected in January 1913 as a memorial to the five members of Robert Falcon Scott's party who perished in March 1912 on the return journey from the South Pole.

== Location ==
Davies Bay lies between Drake Head to the northwest and Cape Kinsey to the southeast. The Aviation Islands are to the north of Cape Kinsey. The Wilson Hills are inland from the bay. Coastal features include Stanwix Ridge, McLeod Glacier, Arthurson Ridge, Cook Ridge, Paternostro Glacier and the Goodman Hills, which include Mount Conrad and the Knight Nunatak.

== Features ==
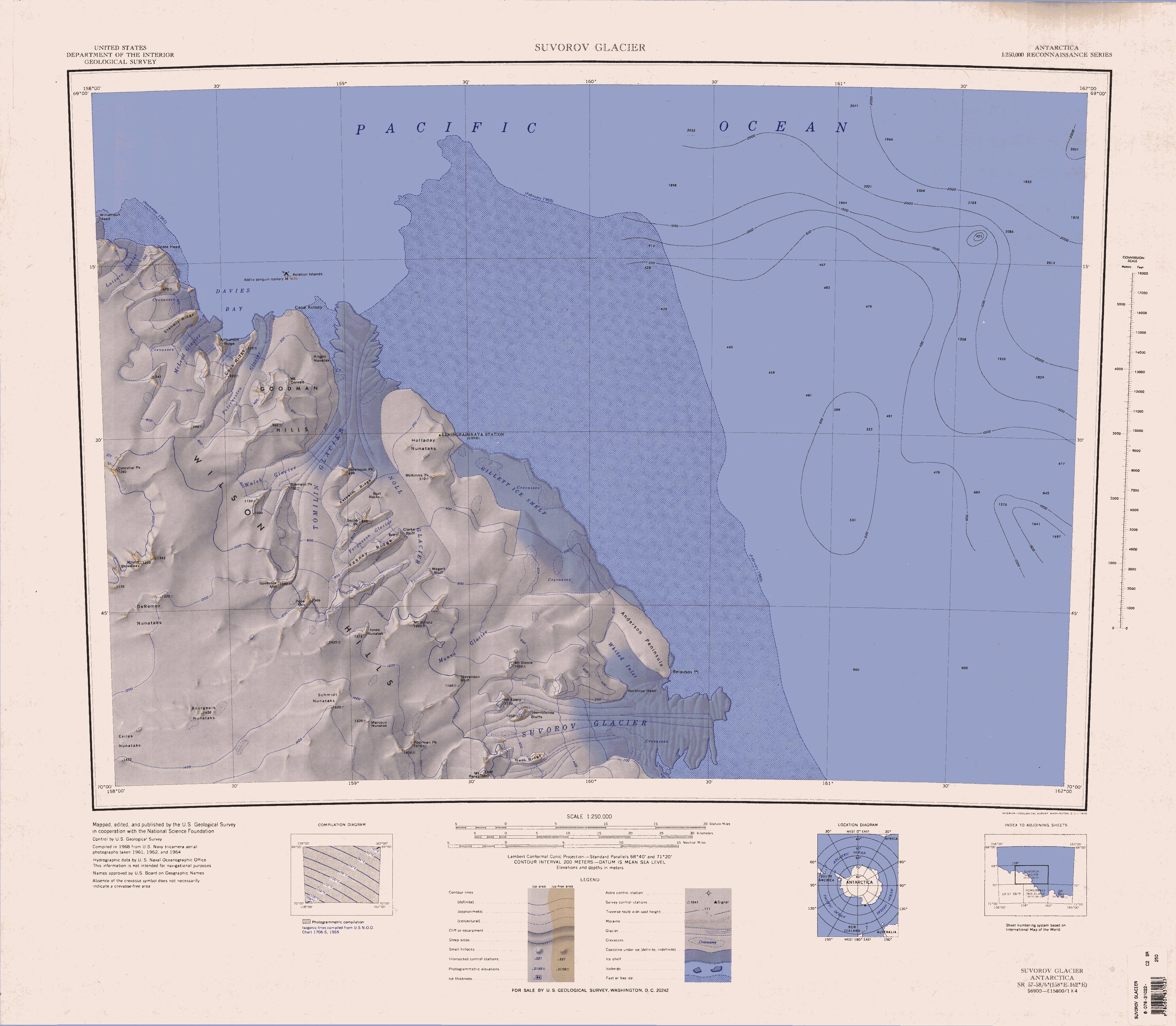
Davies Bay to northwest of map

=== Drake Head ===
69°13′S 158°15′E. A headland forming the west side of the entrance to Davies Bay. Discovered from the Terra Nova under Lieutenant Harry L.L. Pennell, Royal Navy, in February 1911. Named for Francis R.H. Drake, meteorologist on board the Terra Nova.

=== Stanwix Ridge ===
69°20′S 158°20′E. A broad, partly ice-covered coastal ridge or promontory in the Wilson Hills. It extends to the southwest part of Davies Bay immediately west of McLeod Glacier. Photographed from aircraft of United States Navy Operation Highjump, 1946-47. First visited in March 1961 by an airborne field party from Australian National Antarctic Research Expedition (ANARE) (Magga Dan, 1961) led by Phillip Law. Named for Captain John Stanwix, helicopter pilot with the expedition.

=== McLeod Glacier ===
69°22′S 158°22′E. Glacier that descends from the Wilson Hills, between Stanwix and Arthurson Ridges, into Davies Bay. Plotted by Australian cartographers from, air photos taken by United States Navy Operation Highjump, 1946-47. Named by Antarctic Names Committee of Australia (ANCA) for lan R. McLeod, geologist and leader of an airborne field party that visited this area with the ANARE (Magga Dan), 1961.

=== Arthurson Ridge ===
69°22′S 158°30′E. A short coastal ridge or promontory, a northern extension from the Wilson Hills, rising between Cook Ridge and the terminus of McLeod Glacier at the head of Davies Bay. Photographed from aircraft of United States Navy Operation Highjump, 1946-47. First visited by an ANARE airborne field party in March 1961. Named for J. Arthurson, helicopter pilot with ANARE (Magga Dan, 1961) led by Phillip Law.

=== Cook Ridge ===
69°24′S 158°35′E. A northeast trending ridge, mostly ice covered, which parallels the west side of Paternostro Glacier and extends into the southeast corner of Davies Bay. First visited in March 1961 by an ANARE airborne survey party led by Phillip Law. Named for surveyor David Cook of the ANARE expedition.

=== Paternostro Glacier ===
69°24′S 158°37′E. A glacier, 11 nautical miles (20 km; 13 mi) long, in the Wilson Hills. It flows between Cook Ridge and Goodman Hills to enter the east part of Davies Bay. Mapped by United States Geological Survey (USGS) from surveys and United States Navy air photos, 1960-63. Named by United States Advisory Committee on Antarctic Names (US-ACAN) for Lieutenant (j.g.) Joseph L.A. Paternostro, United States Navy Reserve, Navigator in LC-130F Hercules aircraft during Operation Deep Freeze 1967 and 1968.

=== Goodman Hills ===
69°27′S 158°43′E. A group of coastal hills of about 10 nautical miles (19 km; 12 mi) extent, rising directly south of Cape Kinsey and between the Paternostro Glacier and Tomilin Glacier. Mapped by USGS from surveys and United States Navy aerial photography, 1960-63. Named for Cdr. Kelsey B. Goodman, United States Navy, Plans Officer on the staff of the Commander, Naval Support Force Antarctica, 1969-72; Assistant for Polar Regions in the Office of the Secretary of Defense, 1972-74; Member of the Advisory Committee on Antarctic Names, United States Board on Geographic Names, 1973-76.

=== Mount Conrad ===
69°25′S 158°46′E. A somewhat subdued peak that rises to about 600 metres (2,000 ft) high, 6 nautical miles (11 km; 6.9 mi) south of Cape Kinsey, in central Goodman Hills in the Wilson Hills. Mapped by USGS from surveys and United States Navy air photos, 1960-63. Named by US-ACAN for American aviation figure Max Conrad, who, in January 1970, became the first person to fly an aircraft solo to the South Pole.

=== Knight Nunatak ===
69°23′S 158°52′E. A lone coastal nunatak 4 nautical miles (7.4 km; 4.6 mi) south-southeast of Cape Kinsey and 3 nautical miles (5.6 km; 3.5 mi) northeast of Mount Conrad in the Goodman Hills. Mapped by USGS from surveys and air photos, 1960-63. Named by US-ACAN for Melvin W. Knight, United States Navy, Operations Division Yeoman responsible for handling office routine in Washington, DC, Christchurch, and McMurdo Station during OpDFrz 1967-70.

=== Cape Kinsey ===
69°19′S 158°48′E. An ice-covered cape at the east side of Davies Bay. Discovered in February 1911 by Lieutenant H.L.L. Pennell, Royal Navy, of the BrAE under Scott. Named by the BrAE for Mr. J.J. Kinsey, who was the official representative of the expedition at Christchurch, New Zealand.

=== Aviation Islands ===
69°16′S 158°47′E. A group of small rocky islands lying 3 nautical miles (5.6 km; 3.5 mi) north of Cape Kinsey and the Wilson Hills. Mapped by the Soviet Antarctic Expedition, 1958, and named Ostrova Polyarnoy Aviatsii (Polar Aviation Islands). The feature is the site of an Adelie penguin rookery.

== Sources ==
- Alberts, Fred G., ed. (1995), Geographic Names of the Antarctic (PDF) (2 ed.), United States Board on Geographic Names This article incorporates public domain material from websites or documents of the United States Board on Geographic Names.
- Suvorov Glacier, USGS: United States Geological Survey

This article incorporates public domain material from websites or documents of the United States Geological Survey.
