= Nash Range =

Coastal range in the Churchill Mountains of Antarctica

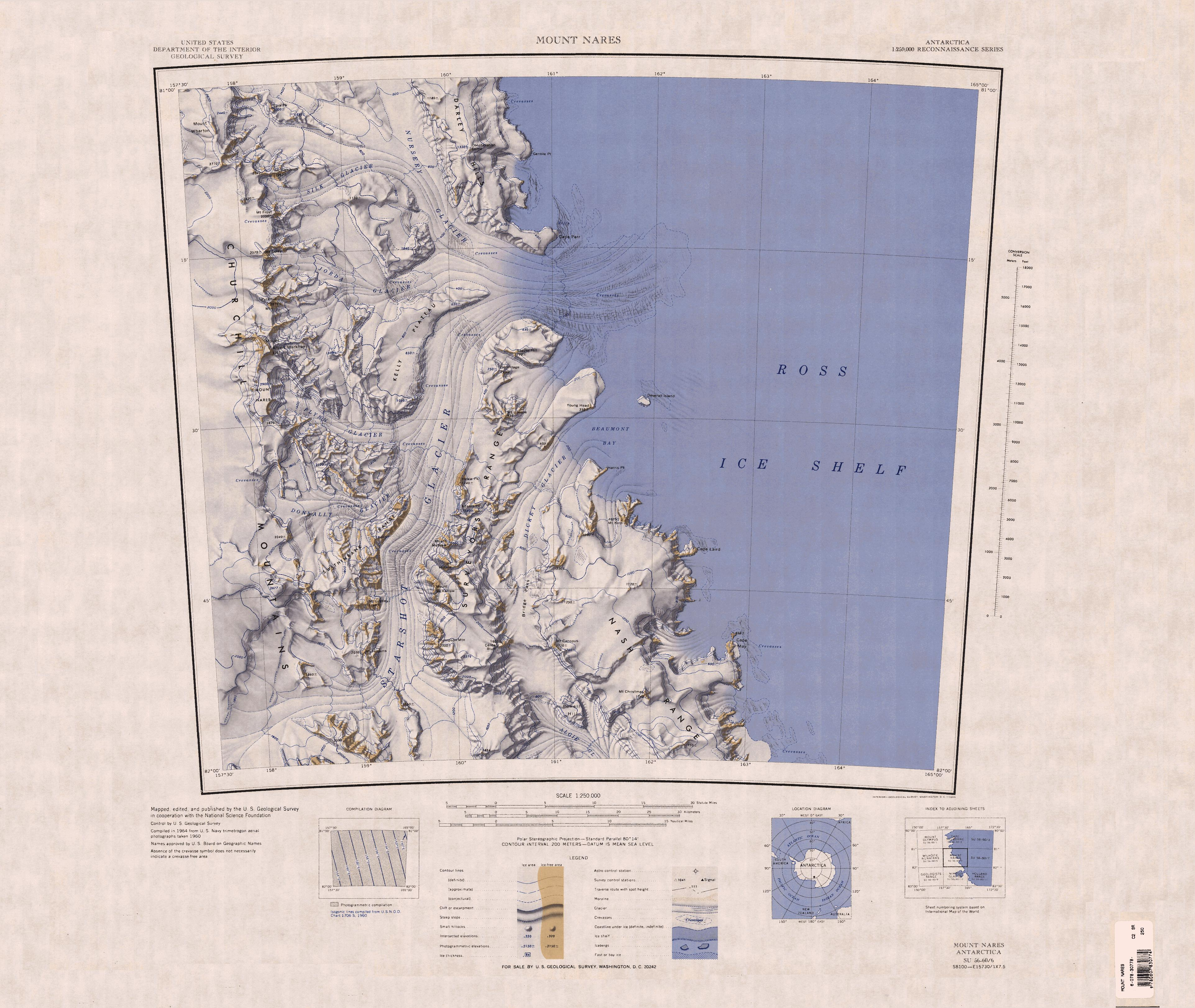

Highest point
- Peak: Mount Christmas
- Elevation: 5,608 ft (1,709 m)

Geography
- Location within Antarctica
- Location: Antarctica
- Region: Ross Dependency
- Range coordinates: 81°55′S 162°0′E

The Nash Range (81°55′S 162°0′E) is a mainly ice-covered coastal range in the Churchill Mountains of Antarctica.

== Location ==
The Nash Range is 40 nautical miles (70 km) long, bordering the west side of the Ross Ice Shelf between the Dickey and Nimrod Glaciers. The Dickey Glacier flows north into Beaumont Bay to the north of the range. To the south of Bridge Pass, the Algie Glacier flows south along the west edge of the range to enter Nimrod Glacier, which passes round the southern end of the range. The Holyoake Range lies to the southwest of the Nash Range. The Surveyors Range is to the northwest.

The range was named by the Ross Sea Committee for Walter Nash who, as Leader of the Opposition and later as Prime Minister of New Zealand, gave strong support to New Zealand participation in the Commonwealth Trans-Antarctic Expedition, 1956–58.

== Topography ==
The Nash Range is composed of metagreywacke intruded by granite. It trends north-north-west from Cape Wilson in the south to Beaumont Bay in the north. The average height is about 4,500 feet (1,400 m). Mount Christmas is the highest peak, at 5,608 feet (1,709 m). The west and east sides of the range have steep scarps, with granite cliffs 2,000 to 3,000 feet (610 to 910 m) high, and sharp ridges spurs of metagreywackes along the coast.

== Glaciers ==
=== Algie Glacier ===
82°08′S 162°05′E. Glacier about 25 miles (40 km) long, flowing southeast into Nimrod Glacier just west of the Nash Range. Named by the N.Z. Ross Sea Committee for the Hon. R.M. Algie who, as Minister in Charge of Scientific and Industrial Research, gave his strong support to the N.Z. party of the CTAE, 1956-58.

== Features ==
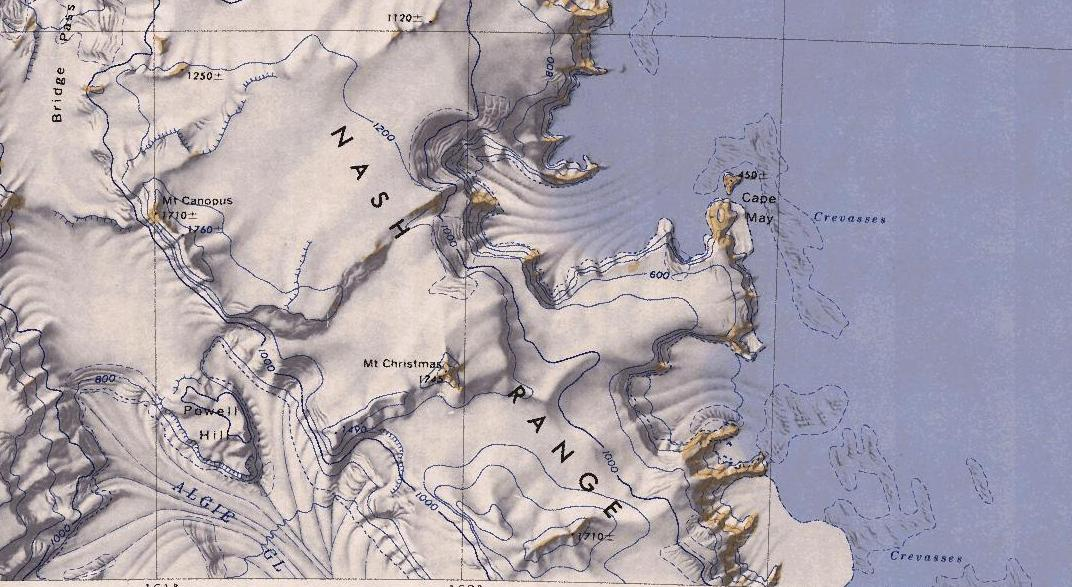
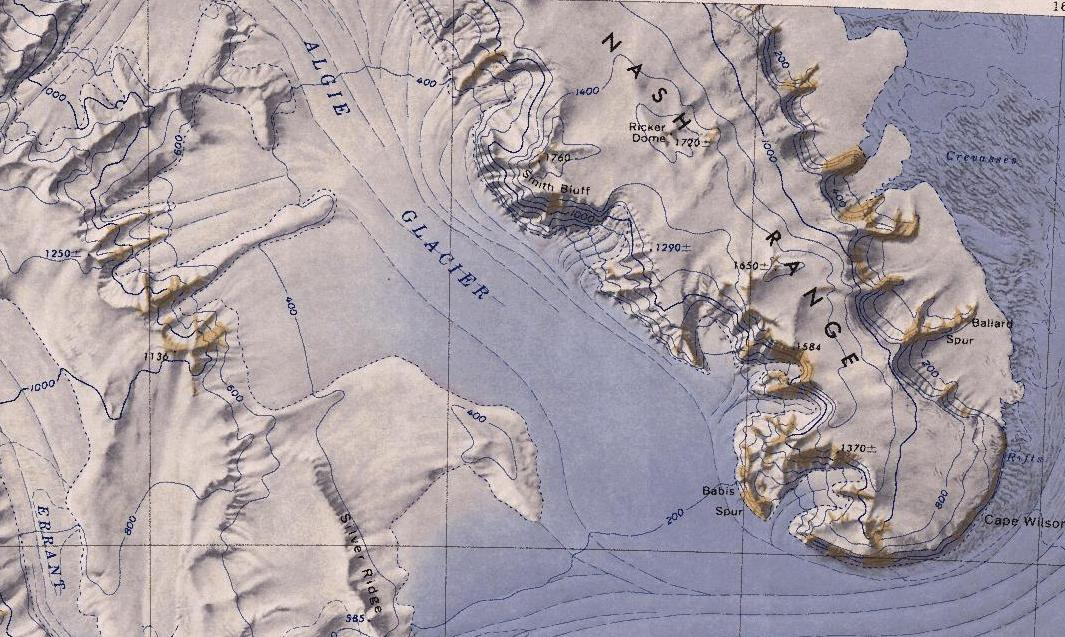
1:250,000 scale topographic maps of the Nash Range

Geographical features from north to south include:

=== Lowe Peak ===
81°40′S 161°22′E. A peak rising to 1,060 metres (3,480 ft), 5 kilometres (3 mi) south-west of Mount Kolp, at the north-west end of the Nash Range. It was named in honor of Peter Allan Lowe, a member of the 1961 Cape Hallett winter-over team, working as a technician on the geomagnetic project.

=== Mount Arcone ===
81°43′S 161°2′E) A horseshoe-shaped mountain rising to 1,350 metres (4,430 ft) in Nash Range, Churchill Mountains. It stands at the east side of Dickey Glacier, 7 nautical miles (13 km) north of Mount Canopus. Named by Advisory Committee on Antarctic Names (US-ACAN) after Steven A. Arcone, U.S. Army Cold Regions Research and Engineering Laboratory (CRREL), who conducted ground radar traverses and airborne radar surveys in the South Pole area, Transantarctic Mountains, and ice sheet of West Antarctica during six field seasons, 1993–2002.

=== Mount Canopus ===
81°50′S 161°00′E. A prominent ice-free peak, 1,710 metres (5,610 ft) high, surmounting the west edge of the Nash Range, 4.5 miles (7.2 km) east of Centaur Bluff. Named by the NZGSAE (1960-61) after the second brightest of the stars, Canopus, used for survey fixes.

=== Mount Christmas ===
81°54′S 161°56′E. A uniform sharp peak, 1,745 metres (5,725 ft) high, standing 9 miles (14 km) west-south-west of Cape May, in the Nash Range. Discovered by the BrNAE (1901-04) and so named because it was the most salient feature in view when the polar party was abreast of it on Christmas Day, 1902.

=== Ricker Dome ===
82°04′S 162°43′E. A snow-free summit, 1,720 metres (5,640 ft) high, standing 3 miles (4.8 km) east of Smith Bluff in the Nash Range. Mapped by the USGS from tellurometer surveys and Navy air photos, 1960-62. Named by US-ACAN for Karl E. Ricker, USARP biologist at McMurdo Sound, 1961.

=== Smith Bluff ===
82°05′S 162°20′E. A steep rounded bluff on the west side of Nash Range to the west of Ricker Dome, overlooking Algie Glacier. Mapped by the USGS from tellurometer surveys and Navy air photos, 1960-62. Named by US-ACAN for H.T.U. Smith, USARP geologist at McMurdo Station, 1963-64.

=== Ballard Spur ===
82°08′S 163°40′E. Spur 5 miles (8.0 km) north of Cape Wilson on the east side of Nash Range. Mapped by the USGS from tellurometer surveys and Navy air photos 1960-62. Named by US-ACAN for Thomas B. Ballard, USARP aurora scientist at Hallett Station, 1961.

=== Babis Spur ===
82°13′S 163°03′E. Rocky spur in the south part of Nash Range, about 6 miles (9.7 km) west of Cape Wilson. Mapped by the USGS from tellurometer surveys and Navy air photos, 1960-62. Named by US-AC AN for William A. Babis, USARP oceanographer on the USCGC Eastwind, 1962-63, and on the USS Burton Island, 1963-64.

=== Cape Wilson ===
82°14′S 163°47′E. A bold, rocky, snow-covered cape, forming the southeast end of the Nash Range and marking the northern entrance point to Shackleton Inlet on the western edge of the Ross Ice Shelf. Discovered by Capt. Robert F. Scott, RN, in December 1902, on his attempted trip to the South Pole. He was accompanied on this trip by Lt. (later Sir) Ernest H. Shackleton, RNR, and Dr. Edward A. Wilson, for whom the cape was named.

== Nearby features ==
=== Alligator Eyes ===
81°38′S 160°55′E. Two adjacent nunataks that rise to over 600 metres (2,000 ft) on the east side of Dickey Glacier in the Churchill Mountains. They surmount the end of the broad ice-covered ridge that extends north from Mount Arcone, and were so named by the Advisory Committee on Antarctic Names because of their apparent resemblance to the eyes of an alligator.

=== Cape May ===
81°50′S 162°50′E A high rock cape along the west side of Ross Ice Shelf, 8 miles (13 km) southeast of Cape Laird. Discovered by the BrNAE (1901-04) and named for Admiral of the Fleet Sir William Henry May, Lord of the Admiralty and Controller of the Navy, 1901-05. Not: Cape William Henry May, May Point.

=== Bridge Pass ===
81°46′S 160°42′E. A high pass between the Surveyors and Nash Ranges, at the upper reaches of the Dickey and Algie Glaciers, affording a passage from the Nimrod Glacier region to Beaumont Bay. Named by NZGSAE (1960-61) for Capt. Lawrence D. Bridge, RNZE, leader at Scott Base from November 1960 to February 1961.

=== Jacobs Peninsula ===
81°52′S 162°39′E. A massive peninsula, 5 miles (8 km) long and 3 miles (5 km) wide, extending east from the Nash Range into the Ross Ice Shelf, Antarctica. The peninsula rises to over 800 metres (2,600 ft) and is ice-covered except for fringing spurs, as at Cape May, the northeastern extremity. It was named by the Advisory Committee on Antarctic Names after Stanley S. Jacobs, an oceanographer at Columbia University's Lamont–Doherty Earth Observatory, who made physical/chemical observations in the Southern Ocean, including the Ross Sea area, between 1963 and 2000.

=== Powell Hill ===
81°56′S 161°11′E. A rounded, ice-covered prominence 6 miles (9.7 km) west-south-west of Mount Christmas, overlooking the head of Algie Glacier. Named by US-ACAN for Lt. Cdr. James A. Powell, USN, communications officer at McMurdo Station during USN OpDFrz 1963 and 1964.

== Sources ==
- Alberts, Fred G., ed. (1995), Geographic Names of the Antarctic (PDF) (2 ed.), United States Board on Geographic Names This article incorporates public domain material from websites or documents of the United States Board on Geographic Names.
- "Alligator Eyes", Geographic Names Information System, United States Geological Survey, United States Department of the Interior
- Laird, M. G. (1963), "Geomorphology and stratigraphy of the nimrod glacier–beaumont bay region, Southern Victoria land, Antarctica", New Zealand Journal of Geology and Geophysics, 6 (3): 465–484, doi:10.1080/00288306.1963.10422076
- "Lowe Peak", Geographic Names Information System, United States Geological Survey, United States Department of the Interior
- "Mount Arcone", Geographic Names Information System, United States Geological Survey, United States Department of the Interior
- Mount Nares, USGS United States Geologic Survey, 1960
- Nimrod Glacier, USGS United States Geologic Survey, 1960
- "Jacobs Peninsula", Geographic Names Information System, United States Geological Survey, United States Department of the Interior
- This article incorporates public domain material from websites or documents of the United States Geological Survey.
