= Mansergh =

Mansergh may refer to:

- Mansergh (surname), with a list of people of this name
- Mansergh, Cumbria, England, a village
- Mansergh Snowfield, snow field of Antarctica
- Mansergh Wall, cliff of Antarctica
