= Kolp =

Kolp may refer to:

== Places ==
- Kolp (Suda tributary), river in Leningrad Oblast and Vologda Oblast (Russia)
- Kolp (Gus tributary), river in Ryazan and Vladimir oblasts, Russia
- Kolp (Ushna tributary), river in Vladimir Oblast, Russia
- Kolp, Vladimir Oblast, village in Russia
- Mount Kolp, Antarctica

== People ==
- Pierre Kolp, Belgian composer
- Ray Kolp, American baseball player

== Other ==
- Kolp a character in the Planet of the Apes movie series
- KOLP-LP, a defunct low-power radio station (100.3 FM) formerly licensed to serve Olympia, Washington, United States
