= Gutenberg Glacier =

Glacier in Antarctica

Gutenberg Glacier (81°58′S 158°32′E) is a glacier 8 nautical miles (15 km; 9.2 mi) long in the northern Holyoake Range of the Churchill Mountains of Antarctica. It flows northwest between Mount Hubble and Mount Richter to enter Starshot Glacier. The glacier was named by the Advisory Committee on Antarctic Names after German-born seismologist Beno Gutenberg, director of the California Institute of Technology seismology laboratory in the 1930s, and collaborator with Charles F. Richter in developing the Richter Scale, 1935, used to measure the magnitude of earthquakes.
