= Mount Waterhouse =

Mount Waterhouse may refer to:

- Mount Waterhouse (Antarctica), in Oates Land
- Mount Waterhouse, New Zealand, the second-highest peak in the Antipodes Islands
