= Harris Point =

Rocky coastal point along Antarctica's Ross Ice Shelf

Harris Point (81°35′S 161°32′E) is a rocky coastal point along the west side of the Ross Ice Shelf, Antarctica. Located 6 nautical miles (11 km) south of Young Head at the south side of Beaumont Bay, it was named by the Advisory Committee on Antarctic Names for Herman D. Harris, a chief hospital corpsman with U.S. Navy Squadron VX-6. Harris built a sick bay at South Pole Station during U.S. Navy Operation Deep Freeze 1961.
