= Cape Wilson =

Cape Wilson may refer to:

- Cape Wilson (Ross Dependency)
- Cape Wilson (South Georgia)
