= Atutahi =

In Māori mythology, Atutahi is the name of Canopus, (Alpha Carinae). Atutahi is the second brightest star in the night-time sky, second only to Sirius (Takurua). Aotahi, Autahi, and Atutahi, "First-light" or "Single-light", were equivalent names that also intimated the star's solitary or self-centered nature.

Atutahi is considered to be a very tapu star, and always dwells alone. This is seen in its position outside the Milky Way.

Of all the stars known to the Māori, Atutahi had a special place, along with Rigel (Puanga), because of their intimate association with kūmara cultivation. Their appearance in the eastern sky was the sign for planting to begin. Atutahi and Puanga could be used to foretell the weather.

Atutahi has several different mythologies attached to it as well. One story tells of how Atutahi was left outside of the basket representing the Milky Way when Tane wove it. Another related myth surrounding the star says that Autahi was the first-born child of Rangi, who refused to enter the Milky Way and so turned it sideways and rose before it. The same name is used for other stars and constellations throughout Polynesia.

== Other names ==
- Aotahi
- Autahi
- Atutahi-mā-Rehua
