= Surveyors Range =

Mountain range in the Churchill Mountains of Antarctica

- Location within Antarctica

Geography
- Location: Antarctica
- Region: Ross Dependency
- Range coordinates: 81°37′S 160°15′E

Surveyors Range (81°37′S 160°15′E) is a 30 miles (48 km) long mountain range in the Churchill Mountains of Antarctica.

== Location ==
Surveyors Range is 30 miles (48 km) long, extending north along the east side of Starshot Glacier from the Thompson Mountain area to the glacier's terminus at the Ross Ice Shelf. The Swithinbank Range is to the west, on the other side of the Starshot Glacier. The Dickey Glacier runs north along the east side of the range.

The range was named by the New Zealand Geological Survey Antarctic Expedition (NZGSAE) (1960–61) for the early pioneering surveyors of New Zealand and present day equivalents in Great Britain who contributed to work carried out in this area by Captain P.J. Hunt, Royal Engineers.

== Glaciers ==
=== Starshot Glacier ===
81°20′S 160°20′E. A glacier 50 miles (80 km) long, flowing from the polar plateau eastward through the Churchill Mountains, then north along the west side of Surveyors Range, entering the Ross Ice Shelf south of Cape Parr. So named by the NZGSAE (1960-61) because the area was surveyed with the use of star observations.

=== Dickey Glacier ===
81°35′S 161°00′E. A glacier 12 miles (19 km) long, flowing north along the east side of the Surveyors Range to enter Beaumont Bay, Ross Ice Shelf. Named by US-ACAN for Capt. Willie M. Dickey, USN, commander, Naval Support Units, Antarctica, at Little America V, winter 1957.

=== Farmer Glacier ===
81°47′S 159°48′E. A glacier flowing north west into Starshot Glacier, and located between Mount McKerrow to the north and Thompson Mountain to the south, at the southern end of the Surveyors Range in Antarctica. It was named in honor of D. W. Farmer, a member of the 1960 Cape Hallett winter-over team, working as a technician on the geomagnetic project.

== Features ==
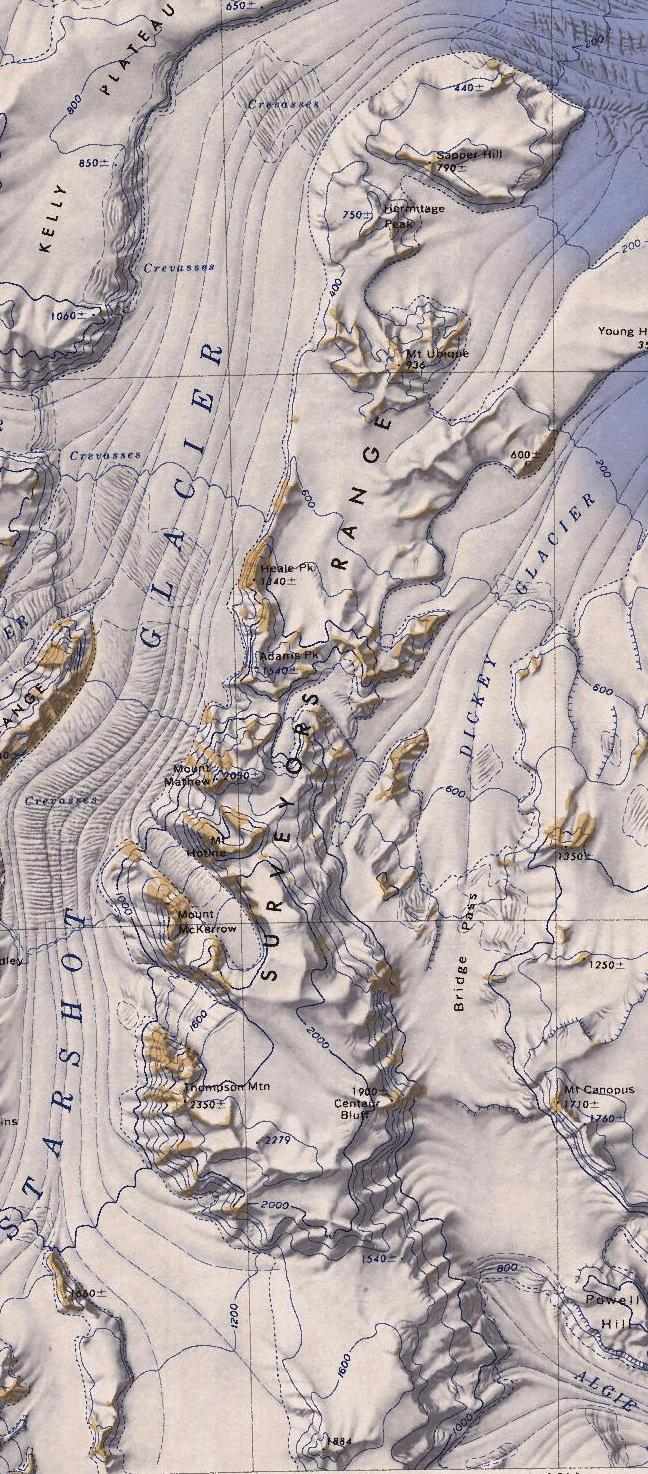
Surveyors Range

Geographical features include, from north to south:

=== Sapper Hill ===
81°24′S 160°38′E. An ice-covered hill 2 miles (3.2 km) northeast of Hermitage Peak, in the northern part of Surveyors Range. Named by the NZGSAE (1960-61), in association with nearby Mount Ubique, for the Royal Engineers.

=== Hermitage Peak ===
81°26′S 160°29′E. A peak, 750 metres (2,460 ft) high, standing 4 miles (6.4 km) north of Mount Ubique, in the Surveyors Range. Named by the NZGSAE (1960-61) for the Military School of Surveying in England.

=== Mount Ubique ===
81°30′S 160°32′E. A peak, 935 metres (3,068 ft) high, standing 4 miles (6.4 km) south of Hermitage Peak in the Surveyors Range. Named by the NZGSAE (1960-61) for the Royal Engineer's motto, meaning "everywhere."

=== Heake Peak ===
81°35′S 160°04′E- A rock peak, 1,340 metres (4,400 ft) high, at the east side of Starshot Glacier, 2 miles (3.2 km) north of Adams Peak in the Surveyors Range. Named by the NZGSAE (1960-61) for Theophilus Heale of New Zealand, an early exponent of the use of triangulation in survey (1868), and later Inspector of Survey for New Zealand.

=== Jones Buttress ===
81°37′S 160°34′E. A wedge-shaped feature similar to and 3 kilometres (2 mi) north of Brown Buttress, where it juts out from the east side of Surveyors Range into Dickey Glacier. It was named in honor of L. R. Jones, a member of the 1959 Cape Hallett winter-over team, working as a scientific officer on the geomagnetic project.

=== Adams Peak ===
81°38′S 160°04′E Peak, 1,540 metres (5,050 ft) high, on the east side of Starshot Glacier, rising 2 miles (3.2 km) south of Heale Peak in Surveyors Range. Named by the NZGSAE (1960-61) for C.W. Adams, one of the early New Zealand surveyors, who in 1883 established the Mount Cook (Wellington) latitude which became the fundamental- position for all N.Z. surveys up to 1949.

=== Mount Mathew ===
81°41′S 159°57′E. A peak, 2,030 metres (6,660 ft) high, standing at the east side of Starshot Glacier, 2 miles (3.2 km) north of Mount Hotine, in the Surveyors Range. Named by the NZGSAE (1960-61) for Felton Mathew, the first Surveyor General of New Zealand, in 1840. Not: Mount Mathews.

=== Mount Hotine ===
81°43′S 160°00′E A peak 2 miles (3.2 km) northeast of Mount McKerrow, in the Surveyors Range. Named by the NZGSAE (1960-61) for Brigadier Martin Hotine, British Director of Overseas Surveys at the time.

=== Mount McKerrow ===
81°45′S 159°48′E A prominent mountain on the east side of Starshot Glacier, standing 5 miles (8.0 km) north of Thompson Mountain in Surveyors Range. Discovered by the NZGSAE (1960-61) and named for James McKerrow, a former Surveyor General of New Zealand.

=== Centaur Bluff ===
81°50′S 160°30′E. A steep bluff on the east side of Surveyors Range, 4.5 miles (7.2 km) west of Mount Canopus. Named by the NZGSAE (1960-61) after the star Centauri, which was frequently used to fix survey stations.

=== Thompson Mountain ===
81°50′S 159°48′E. A mountain, 2,350 metres (7,710 ft) high, standing 5 miles (8.0 km) south of Mount McKerrow in the southwest part of Surveyors Range. Named by the NZGSAE (1960-61) for Edgar H. Thompson, Professor of Surveying and Photogrammetry at the University College of London, England. Not: Mount Thompson.

== Nearby features ==
=== Howard-Williams Point ===
81°26′S 161°25′E. A prominent point extending into the Ross Ice Shelf, located just north of Beaumont Bay, north east of the Surveyors Range. It was named in honor of Clive Howard-Williams, an ecologist who led several research events in the McMurdo Dry Valleys, Darwin Glacier, and Bratina Island areas from 1984 onwards. Howard-Williams was an Antarctica New Zealand Board member 1996–2000, and provided considerable input to international Antarctic science and environmental management, including development of a McMurdo Dry Valleys Antarctic Specially Managed Area. He went on to become the Scientific Committee on Antarctic Research (SCAR) delegate for New Zealand and also one of the four SCAR Vice-Presidents.

=== Brown Buttress ===
81°41′S 160°30′E A wedge-shaped buttress rising to approximately 800 metres (2,600 ft), located near the head of Dickey Glacier, which flows into Beaumont Bay. It was named in honor of R F Brown, a member of the 1960 Cape Hallett winter-over team, working as a technician on the geomagnetic project.

=== Bridge Pass ===
81°46′S 160°42′E. A high pass between Surveyors Range and Nash Range, at the upper reaches of Dickey Glacier and Algie Glacier, affording a passage from the Nimrod Glacier region to Beaumont Bay. It was named by the New Zealand Geological Survey Antarctic Expedition (1960–61) for Captain Lawrence D. Bridge, Royal New Zealand Engineers, leader at Scott Base from November 1960 to February 1961.

=== Bieber Bench ===
81°57′S 160°23′E. A relatively horizontal upland area of 20 square miles (50 km^{2}) at the south side of the Surveyors Range, Churchill Mountains. The ice-covered feature rises to 1,800 metres (5,900 ft) between Mansergh Snowfield and the head of Algie Glacier. It was named by the Advisory Committee on Antarctic Names after John W. Bieber of the Bartol Research Institute, University of Delaware: he was United States Antarctic Program principal investigator for solar and heliospheric studies with Antarctic cosmic ray observations at McMurdo Station and South Pole Station, 1988–2002.

=== Mansergh Snowfield ===
82°1′S 159°50′E. A snowfield in Antarctica feeding the central portion of Starshot Glacier, separating the Surveyors Range and Holyoake Range. It was seen by the Holyoake, Cobham and Queen Elizabeth Ranges party of the New Zealand Geological Survey Antarctic Expedition (1964–65) and named for G. Mansergh, a geologist with the party.

=== Mansergh Wall ===
82°6′S 160°18′E. An ice-covered cliff, 4 nautical miles (7 km) long, running east–west between Mansergh Snowfield and the head of Errant Glacier in the Churchill Mountains of Antarctica. The cliff rises to over 1,600 metres (5,200 ft) and forms part of the divide between the north–flowing Starshot Glacier system, which includes Mansergh Snowfield, and the Nimrod Glacier system, which includes the south–flowing Errant Glacier. It was named by the Advisory Committee on Antarctic Names in association with Mansergh Snowfield.

== Sources ==
- Alberts, Fred G., ed. (1995), Geographic Names of the Antarctic (PDF) (2 ed.), United States Board on Geographic Names This article incorporates public domain material from websites or documents of the United States Board on Geographic Names.
- "Bieber Bench", Geographic Names Information System, United States Geological Survey, United States Department of the Interior
- "Bridge Pass", Geographic Names Information System, United States Geological Survey, United States Department of the Interior
- "Brown Buttress", Geographic Names Information System, United States Geological Survey, United States Department of the Interior
- "Farmer Glacier", Geographic Names Information System, United States Geological Survey, United States Department of the Interior
- "Howard-Williams Point", Geographic Names Information System, United States Geological Survey, United States Department of the Interior
- "Jones Buttress", Geographic Names Information System, United States Geological Survey, United States Department of the Interior
- "Mansergh Snowfield", Geographic Names Information System, United States Geological Survey, United States Department of the Interior
- "Mansergh Wall", Geographic Names Information System, United States Geological Survey, United States Department of the Interior
- Mount Nares, USGS United States Geologic Survey, 1960
- This article incorporates public domain material from websites or documents of the United States Geological Survey.
