= Starshot Glacier =

Glacier in Antarctica

- Location within Antarctica
- Coordinates: 81°20′S 160°20′E
- Length: 90 kilometres (56 mi)
- Terminus: Ross Ice Shelf

Starshot Glacier (81°20′S 160°20′E) is a glacier 50 nautical miles (90 km) long that flows through the Churchill Mountains to enter the Ross Ice Shelf in Antarctica.

== Location ==
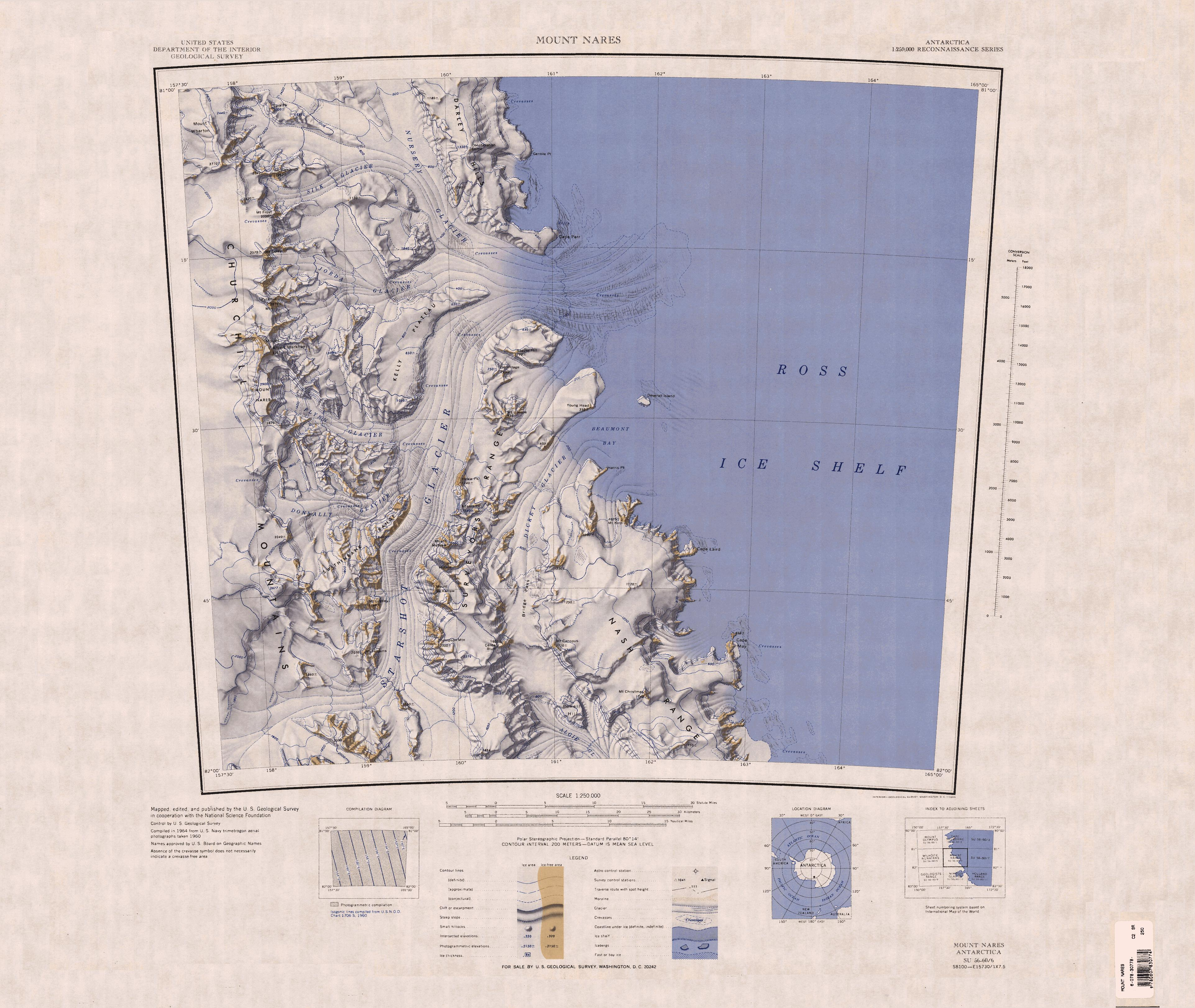
Mount Nares region. Starshot to the southwest

The Starshot Glacier flows from the polar plateau eastward through the Churchill Mountains, then north along the west side of Surveyors Range, entering the Ross Ice Shelf south of Cape Parr. It merges with the Nursery Glacier, coming from the north, at its mouth on the Ross Ice Shelf. So named by the New Zealand Geological Survey Antarctic Expedition (NZGSAE) (1960–61) because the area was surveyed with the use of star observations.

== Head of glacier ==
=== Chapman Snowfield ===
81°30′S 157°20′E. A large snowfield lying west of the central ridge in the Churchill Mountains. It is bounded to the north by Elder Peak and the massif surmounted by Mount Wharton, to the south by Soza Icefalls, Black Icefalls and the head of Starshot Glacier, and to the west by the Wallabies Nunataks and the All-Blacks Nunataks.

=== Soza Icefalls ===
81°51′00″S 157°48′00″E. A line of icefalls nearly 200 metres (660 ft) high at the southern margin of Chapman Snowfield. The icefalls extend southwest for 12 nautical miles (22 km) from Mount Massam, ending near the head of Starshot Glacier. They were named after Ezekiel R. Soza, a United States Geological Survey topographic engineer with the Topo North - Topo South survey expedition in these mountains, 1961–62.

=== Black Icefalls ===
81°46′S 157°14′E. A line of icefalls at the south margin of Chapman Snowfield. The icefalls extend southwest from Mount Massam to Vance Bluff, and were named in honor of A. W. Black, a member of the 1959 Cape Hallett winter-over team, working as a technician on the geomagnetic project.

== Tributaries ==
=== Ahern Glacier ===
81°47′S 159°10′E A small tributary glacier flowing E from the Churchill Mountains between Mount Lindley and Mount Hoskins to enter Starshot Glacier. Named by the Holyoake, Cobham, and Queen Elizabeth Ranges Party of the NZGSAE (1964-65) for B. Ahem, a member of the party.

=== Donnally Glacier ===
81°37′S 159°18′E. A glacier about 12 miles (19 km) long in the Churchill Mountains, flowing east along the north side of Swithinbank Range to enter Starshot Glacier. Named by US-ACAN for Cdr. Edward W. Donnally, USN, officer in charge of Naval support personnel at McMurdo Station, winter 1962.

=== Flynn Glacier ===
81°31′S 159°21′E. A glacier about 10 miles (16 km) long, draining eastward from Mount Nares in the Churchill Mountains and entering Starshot Glacier south of Kelly Plateau. Named by US-ACAN for Cdr. William F. Flynn (CEC), USN, commanding officer Mobile Construction Battalion, Special Detachment Bravo, at McMurdo Sound, winter 1957.

=== Mansergh Snowfield ===
82°01′S 159°50′E A snowfield feeding the central portion of the Starshot Glacier, separating Surveyors Range and Holyoake Range. Seen by the Holyoake, Cobham and Queen Elizabeth Ranges party of the NZGSAE (1964-65) and named for G. Mansergh, geologist with the party.

=== Sivjee Glacier ===
81°57′S 159°23′E. A glacier 10 nautical miles (18 km) long which drains the northeast slopes of Hunt Mountain. It flows north along the west side of Stark Ridge to enter Starshot Glacier south of Mount Hoskins. Named by Advisory Committee on Antarctic Names (US-ACAN) after Gulamabas G. Sivjee, United States Antarctic Program (USAP) principal investigator for spectroscopic and interferometric studies of airglow and auroral processes in the upper atmosphere above the geographic South Pole, 1991–2001.

== Sources ==
- Alberts, Fred G., ed. (1995), Geographic Names of the Antarctic (PDF) (2 ed.), United States Board on Geographic Names This article incorporates public domain material from websites or documents of the United States Board on Geographic Names.
- "Black Icefalls", Geographic Names Information System, United States Geological Survey, United States Department of the Interior
- "Chapman Snowfield", Geographic Names Information System, United States Geological Survey, United States Department of the Interior
- Mount Nares, USGS
- "Sivjee Glacier", Geographic Names Information System, United States Geological Survey, United States Department of the Interior
- "Soza Icefalls", Geographic Names Information System, United States Geological Survey, United States Department of the Interior
- This article incorporates public domain material from websites or documents of the United States Geological Survey.
