= Chris Mace =

New Zealand businessman

Sir Chris Mace KNZM
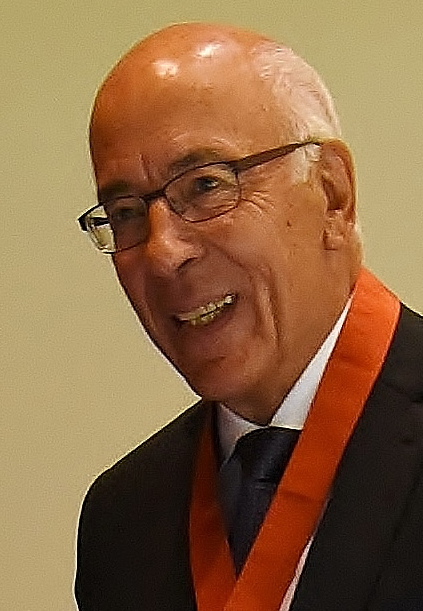
- Mace in 2016
- Born: Christopher Robert Mace; 1943 or 1944 (age 81–82)

Sir Christopher Robert Mace KNZM (born 1943 or 1944) is a New Zealand businessman. In the 2005 New Year Honours, he was appointed a Companion of the New Zealand Order of Merit, for services to the Antarctic and the community, and in the 2016 Queen's Birthday Honours, he was promoted to Knight Companion of the New Zealand Order of Merit, for services to science and education.

Mace served as chair of the board of Antarctica New Zealand from its establishment in 1996 until 2003, and Mount Mace in Antarctica is named in his honour.

In 2015, Mace was inducted into the New Zealand Business Hall of Fame.
