= Chapman Snowfield =

American snowfield

- Snow field
- Location within Antarctica
- Coordinates: 81°30′S 157°20′E

Chapman Snowfield (81°30′S 157°20′E) is a large snowfield lying west of the central ridge in the Churchill Mountains in the Ross Dependency region of Antarctica.

== Location ==
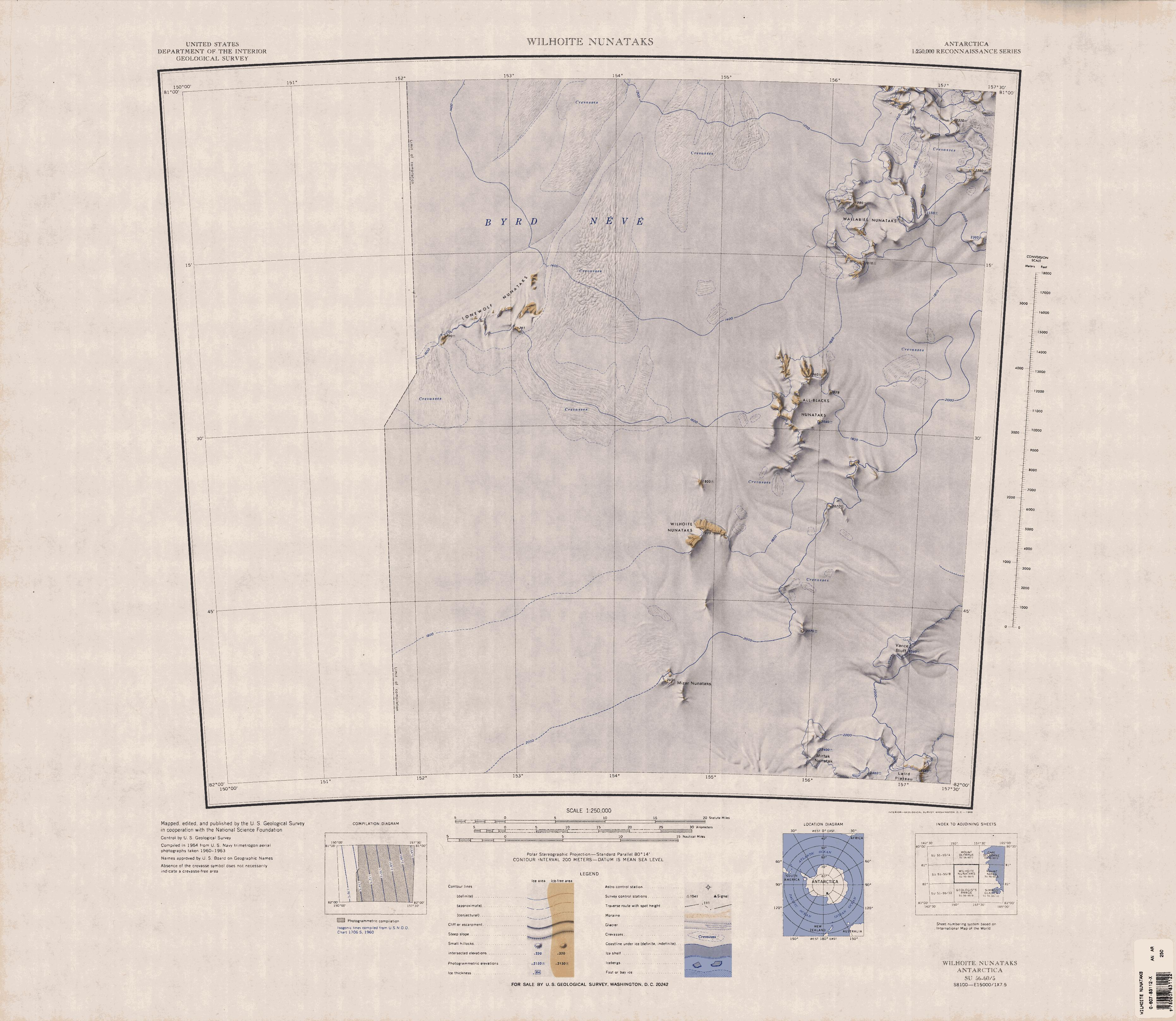
Byrd Névé, Chapman Snowfield to the east

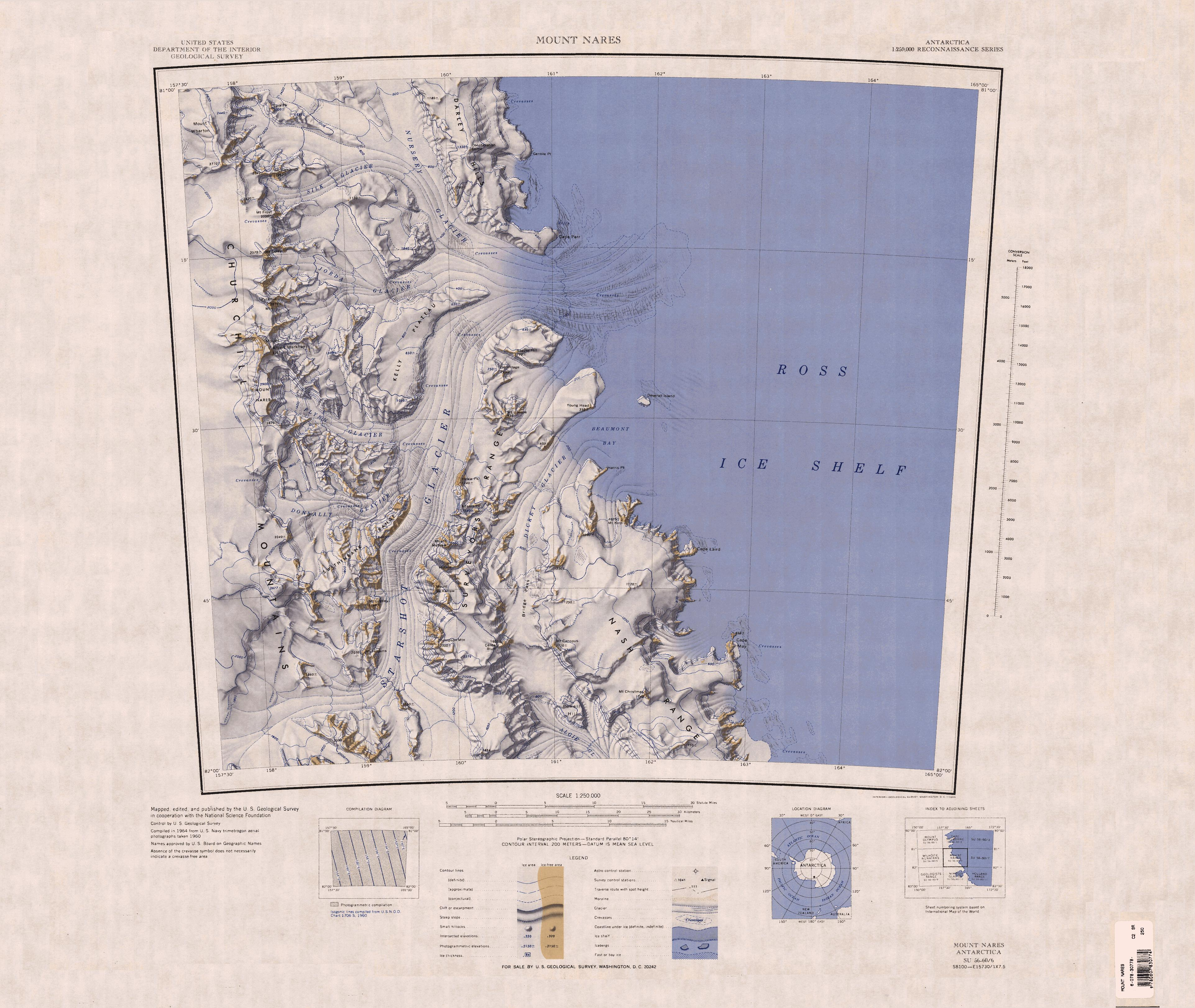
Eastern edge of the snowfield

Chapman Snowfield is bounded to the north by Elder Peak and the massif surmounted by Mount Wharton, to the south by Soza Icefalls, Black Icefalls and the head of Starshot Glacier, and to the west by the Wallabies Nunataks and the All-Blacks Nunataks. The Gamble Glacier flows northwest from Chapman Snowfield between Green Nunatak to the southwest and Keating Massif to the northeast. The Soza Icefalls and Black Icefalls extend south to near the head of Starshot Glacier.

Chapman Snowfield was named after William H. Chapman, topographic engineer, United States Geological Survey, leader of the 1961–62 Topo North – Topo South survey of mountains west of the Ross Sea from Cape Roget, Adare Peninsula, to Otway Massif at the head of Beardmore Glacier, a traverse totalling 1,570 miles (2,530 km). This first helicopter-supported traverse with electronic-distance-measuring instruments resulted in the establishment of ground control making possible the mapping of a 100,000-square-mile (260,000 km^{2}) area of the Transantarctic Mountains.

== Features ==
=== Elder Peak ===
81°7′S 157°20′E. A peak at the north margin of Chapman Snowfield in the Churchill Mountains. The peak rises to 2,360 metres (7,740 ft) 6 nautical miles (11 km) southwest of Mount Wharton. It was named after William C. Elder, a United States Geological Survey topographic engineer with the Topo North – Topo South survey expedition in these mountains, 1961–62.

=== Rutland Nunatak ===
81°36′S 156°8′E. A cone-shaped nunatak with associated rock outcrops, 2,070 metres (6,790 ft) high, in the west part of Chapman Snowfield. The nunatak is 10 nautical miles (18 km) east-northeast of Wilhoite Nunataks. Named by Advisory Committee on Antarctic Names (US-ACAN) after cartographer Jane Rutland Brown, Antarctic map compilation specialist in the United States Geological Survey (USGS) Branch of Special Maps, 1951–71.

=== Wallabies Nunataks ===
81°12′S 156°20′E. A large group of nunataks near the polar plateau, lying 10 miles (16 km) northeast of All-Blacks Nunataks at the east side of the Byrd Névé. Named by the NZGSAE (1960-61) for the well known Australian rugby team.

=== All-Blacks Nunataks ===
81°29′S 155°45′E A group of conspicuous nunataks lying midway between Wallabies Nunataks and Wilhoite Nunataks at the southeast margin of the Byrd Névé. Named by the NZGSAE (1960-61) for the well known New Zealand rugby team.

== Sources ==
- Alberts, Fred G., ed. (1995), Geographic Names of the Antarctic (PDF) (2 ed.), United States Board on Geographic Names This article incorporates public domain material from websites or documents of the United States Board on Geographic Names.
- "Black Icefalls", Geographic Names Information System, United States Geological Survey, United States Department of the Interior
- "Chapman Snowfield", Geographic Names Information System, United States Geological Survey, United States Department of the Interior
- "Elder Peak", Geographic Names Information System, United States Geological Survey, United States Department of the Interior
- "Gamble Glacier", Geographic Names Information System, United States Geological Survey, United States Department of the Interior
- "Soza Icefalls", Geographic Names Information System, United States Geological Survey, United States Department of the Interior
- This article incorporates public domain material from websites or documents of the United States Geological Survey.
