= Swithinbank Range =

Mountain range in Antarctica

- Location within Antarctica

Geography
- Location: Antarctica
- Region: Ross Dependency
- Range coordinates: 81°42′S 159°0′E

Swithinbank Range (81°42′S 159°0′E) is a small range from the Churchill Mountains,

== Location ==
The Swithinbank Range extends eastward between Donnally and Ahern Glaciers to the west side of Starshot Glacier. It faces the Surveyors Range on the east side of the Starshot Glacier. It was named by the New Zealand Geological Survey Antarctic Expedition (NZGSAE) (1959–60) for Charles W. Swithinbank, glaciologist that season at Little America V.

== Geology ==
The bulk of the Holyoake and Swithinbank Ranges are made up of the Shackleton Limestone formation, which lies unconformably on an unweathered surface cut across beds of the Goldie Formation north of the Nimrod Glacier. It includes the Cambrian limestone that crops out between the Byrd and Nimrod Glaciers and in the upper Beardmore Glacier.

== Glaciers ==
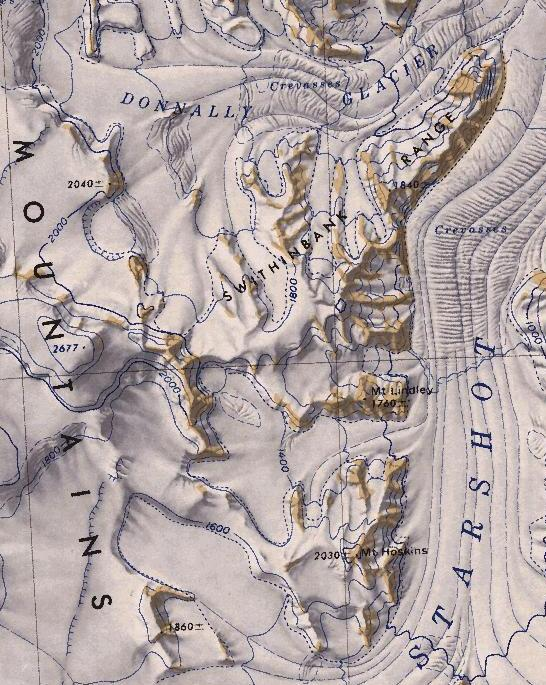
1:250.000 map of the range

=== Ahern Glacier ===
81°47′S 159°10′E. A small tributary glacier flowing east from the Churchill Mountains between Mount Lindley and Mount Hoskins to enter Starshot Glacier. Named by the Holyoake, Cobham, and Queen Elizabeth Ranges Party of the NZGSAE (1964-65) for B. Ahem, a member of the party.

=== Donnally Glacier ===
81°37′S 159°18′E. A glacier about 12 miles (19 km) long in the Churchill Mountains, flowing east along the north side of Swithinbank Range to enter Starshot Glacier. Named by US-ACAN for Cdr. Edward W. Donnally, USN, officer in charge of Naval support personnel at McMurdo Station, winter 1962.

== Features ==
=== Mount Gough ===
81°38′S 159°22′E. The prominent mountain that forms the eastern portion of Swithinbank Range in the Churchill Mountains. The feature rises more than 1,000 metres (3,300 ft) above the west side of Starshot Glacier where it is joined by Donnally Glacier. Named by the U.S. Advisory Committee on Antarctic Names (1967) for R.P. Gough, Surveyor General of New Zealand.

=== Mount Lindley ===
81°46′S 159°05′E. A mountain, 1,760 metres (5,770 ft) high, standing on the west side of Starshot Glacier, 4 miles (6.4 km) north of Mount Hoskins. Discovered by the BrNAE (1901-04) and named for Lord Nathaniel Lindley, a member of the committee that made the final draft of instructions for the expedition.

== Nearby features ==
=== Mount Massam ===
81°44′S 158°12′E. A broad ice-covered mountain about 8 miles (13 km) west of Mount Lindley, in the Churchill Mountains. Named by the Holyoake, Cobham, and Queen Elizabeth Ranges Party of the NZGSAE (1964-65) for D. Massam, member of the party.

=== Mount Hoskins ===
81°50′S 159°03′E. A mountain, 2,030 metres (6,660 ft) high, standing on the west side of Starshot Glacier, 4 miles (6.4 km) south of Mount Lindley. Discovered by the BrNAE (1901-04) and named for Sir Anthony Hoskins, a former Lord of the Admiralty and a member of the expedition Ship Committee.

=== Horseshoe Nunatak ===
81°52′S 158°25′E. A horseshoe-shaped nunatak in the Churchill Mountains, located 5 nautical miles (9 km) west of Mount Hoskins on the north side of the upper portion of Starshot Glacier. The nunatak was charted and descriptively named by the New Zealand Geological Survey Antarctic Expedition of 1964–65.

=== Reid Bluff ===
81.6666667°S 158.3°E. A bluff rising to 2,040 metres (6,690 ft) at the head of Donnally Glacier. Named in honor of B. E. Reid, a member of the 1959 Cape Hallett winter-over team, working as a biologist on the geomagnetic project.

== Sources ==
- Alberts, Fred G., ed. (1995), Geographic Names of the Antarctic (PDF) (2 ed.), United States Board on Geographic Names This article incorporates public domain material from websites or documents of the United States Board on Geographic Names.
- Laird, M. G.; Mansergh, G. D.; Chappell, J. M. A. (1971), "Geology of the Central Nimrod Glacier area, Antarctica", New Zealand Journal of Geology and Geophysics, vol. 14, no. 3, pp. 427–468, doi:10.1080/00288306.1971.10421939
- Mount Nares, USGS
- "Reid Bluff", Geographic Names Information System, United States Geological Survey, United States Department of the Interior
