= Mansergh (surname) =

Mansergh is a surname. Notable people with the surname include:

- Aubrey Mansergh (1898–1990), Royal Navy officer
- James Mansergh (1834–1905), English civil engineer
- Martin Mansergh (1946–2025), Irish politician and historian
- Maurice Mansergh (1896–1966), Royal Navy officer
- Nicholas Mansergh (1910–1991), historian of Ireland and the British Commonwealth
- Richard St George Mansergh-St George (c.1752–1798), British Army officer and Irish magistrate
- Robert Mansergh (1900–1970), British Army officer
