= Cape Laird =

Rocky cape of Ross Ice Shelf, Antarctica

Cape Laird (81°41′S 162°27′E) is a rocky cape 8 nautical miles (15 km) northwest of Cape May, along the west side of the Ross Ice Shelf, Antarctica. It was named by the New Zealand Geological Survey Antarctic Expedition (NZGSAE) (1960–61) for Malcolm G. Laird, a NZGSAE geologist who took a special interest in the peneplain surface above the cape's granite cliffs.
