= Dickey Glacier =

Glacier in Antarctica

Dickey Glacier (81°35′S 161°0′E) is a glacier 12 nautical miles (22 km) long, flowing north along the east side of the Surveyors Range to enter Beaumont Bay, Ross Ice Shelf. It was named by the Advisory Committee on Antarctic Names for Captain Willie M. Dickey, U.S. Navy, commander of the Naval Support Units, Antarctica, at Little America V in winter 1957.
