= Kolp, Vladimir Oblast =

Kolp Колпь
- Selo
- Location within Vladimir Oblast Location within Russia
- Coordinates: 55°14′N 41°02′E
- Country: Russia
- Region: Vladimir Oblast
- District: Gus-Khrustalny District
- Time zone: UTC+3:00

Kolp (Russian: Колпь) is a rural locality (a selo) in Kupreyevskoye Rural Settlement, Gus-Khrustalny District, Vladimir Oblast, Russia. The population was 704 as of 2010. There are 6 streets.

== Geography ==
Kolp is located on the Kolp River, 65 km southeast of Gus-Khrustalny (the district's administrative centre) by road. Talanovo is the nearest rural locality.
