= Young Head =

Young Head (81°29′S 161°24′E) is a prominent rock headland, 350 meters high, marking the north side of the entrance to Beaumont Bay on the west side of the Ross Ice Shelf named by Advisory Committee on Antarctic Names (US-ACAN) for CWO Victor Young, U.S. Navy, member of the Mobile Construction Battalion party at Little America V, winter 1956.
