= Mount Kolp =

Mountain in Ross Dependency, Antarctica

Mount Kolp (81°39′S 161°42′E) is a mostly ice-free coastal mountain, 1,010 metres (3,300 ft) high, standing 7 nautical miles (13 km) west-northwest of Cape Laird, along the west side of the Ross Ice Shelf, Antarctica. It was named by the Advisory Committee on Antarctic Names for Lieutenant Colonel H.R. Kolp, United States Marine Corps, executive officer of U.S. Navy Squadron VX-6 in Antarctica during Operation Deep Freeze I (1955–56).
