= Wallabies Nunataks =

Mountain range in Antarctica

- Location within Antarctica

Geography
- Continent: Antarctica
- Region: Ross Dependency
- Range coordinates: 81°12′S 156°20′E
- Parent range: Churchill Mountains

Wallabies Nunataks (81°12′S 156°20′E) is a large group of nunataks near the polar plateau, to the west of the Churchill Mountains, Antarctica.

== Location ==
The Wallabies Nunataks are 10 nautical miles (18 km) northeast of All-Blacks Nunataks at the east side of the Byrd Névé. They border the Chapman Snowfield to the west. They were named by the New Zealand Geological Survey Antarctic Expedition (NZGSAE) (1960–61) for the Australian national rugby team.

== Features ==
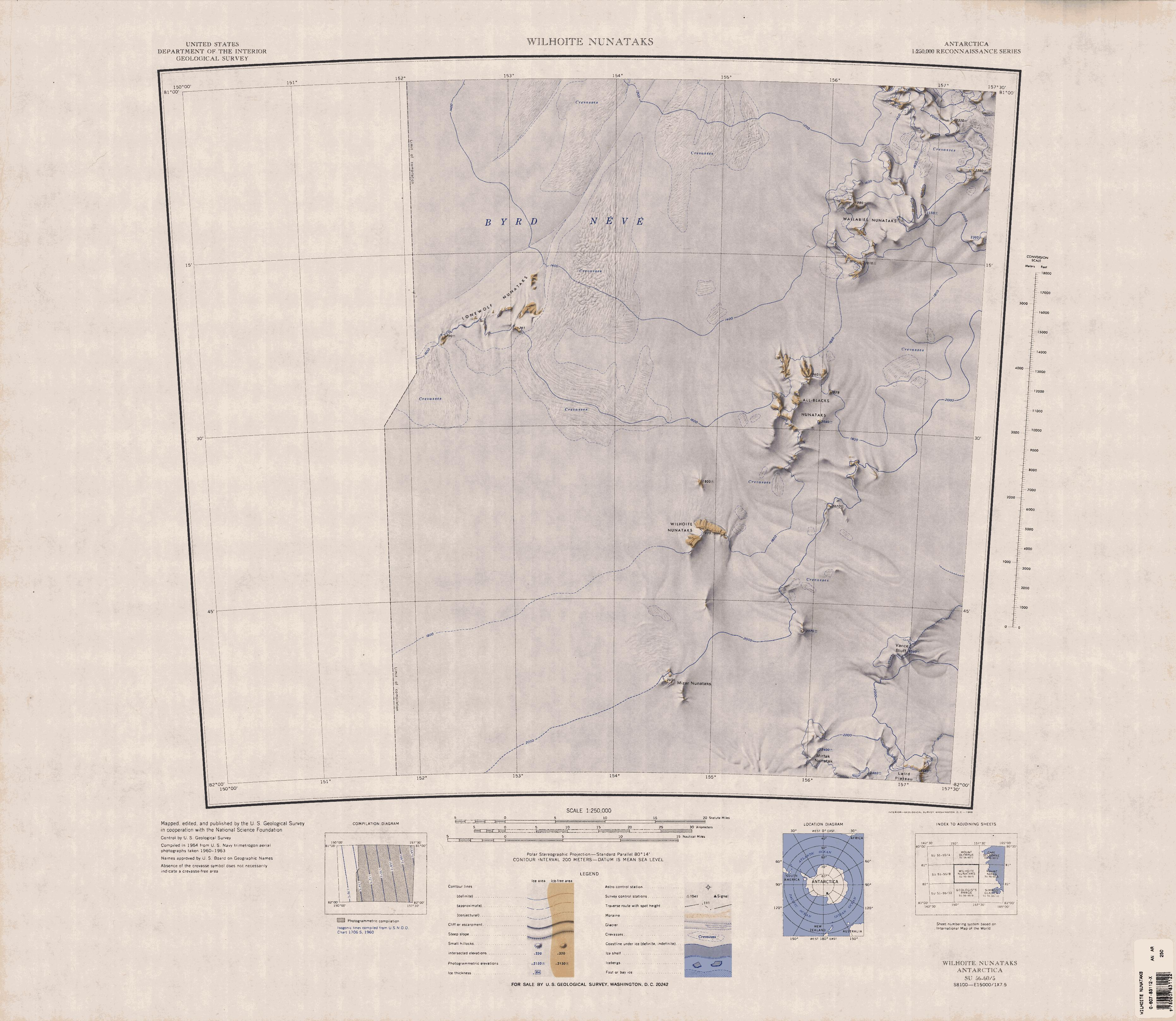
Byrd Névé, Wallabies Nunataks to the northeast

=== Bledisloe Glacier ===
81°22′S 156°21′E. A glacier flowing north west between All-Blacks Nunataks and Wallabies Nunataks. It was named in association with the adjacent All-Blacks and Wallabies Nunataks, and specifically named after the Bledisloe Cup, which is contested between the New Zealand and Australian rugby union teams, the All-Blacks and the Wallabies.

=== Mount Stent ===
81°15′S 156°20′E. A 2,010 metres (6,590 ft) high mountain at the southern extreme of the Wallabies Nunataks. It was named in honor of N. E. Stent, a member of the 1961 Cape Hallett winter-over team, working as a technician on the geomagnetic project.

=== Woodgyer Peak ===
81°13′S 156°20′E. A peak above 2,000 metres (6,600 ft) in the Wallabies Nunataks. Named in honor of M. G. Woodgyer, a member of the 1962 Cape Hallett winter-over team, working as a technician on the geomagnetic project.

=== Mount Exley ===
81°10′S 156°14′E. A mountain 1,980 metres (6,500 ft) high in the Wallabies Nunataks. It was named in honor of R. R. Exley, a member of the 1962 Cape Hallett winter-over team, working as a technician on the geomagnetic project.

=== Green Nunatak ===
81°7′S 156°34′E. A nunatak rising to approximately 1,800 metres (6,000 ft) at the northern extreme of the Wallabies Nunataks. It was named in honor of E. N. Green, a member of the 1964 Cape Hallett winter-over team, working as a technician on the geomagnetic project.

== Sources ==
- Alberts, Fred G., ed. (1995), Geographic Names of the Antarctic (PDF) (2 ed.), United States Board on Geographic Names This article incorporates public domain material from websites or documents of the United States Board on Geographic Names.
- "Bledisloe Glacier", Geographic Names Information System, United States Geological Survey, United States Department of the Interior
- "Chapman Snowfield", Geographic Names Information System, United States Geological Survey, United States Department of the Interior
- "Green Nunatak", Geographic Names Information System, United States Geological Survey, United States Department of the Interior
- "Mount Exley", Geographic Names Information System, United States Geological Survey, United States Department of the Interior
- "Mount Stent", Geographic Names Information System, United States Geological Survey, United States Department of the Interior
- "Woodgyer Peak", Geographic Names Information System, United States Geological Survey, United States Department of the Interior
- This article incorporates public domain material from websites or documents of the United States Geological Survey.
