= Beaumont Bay =

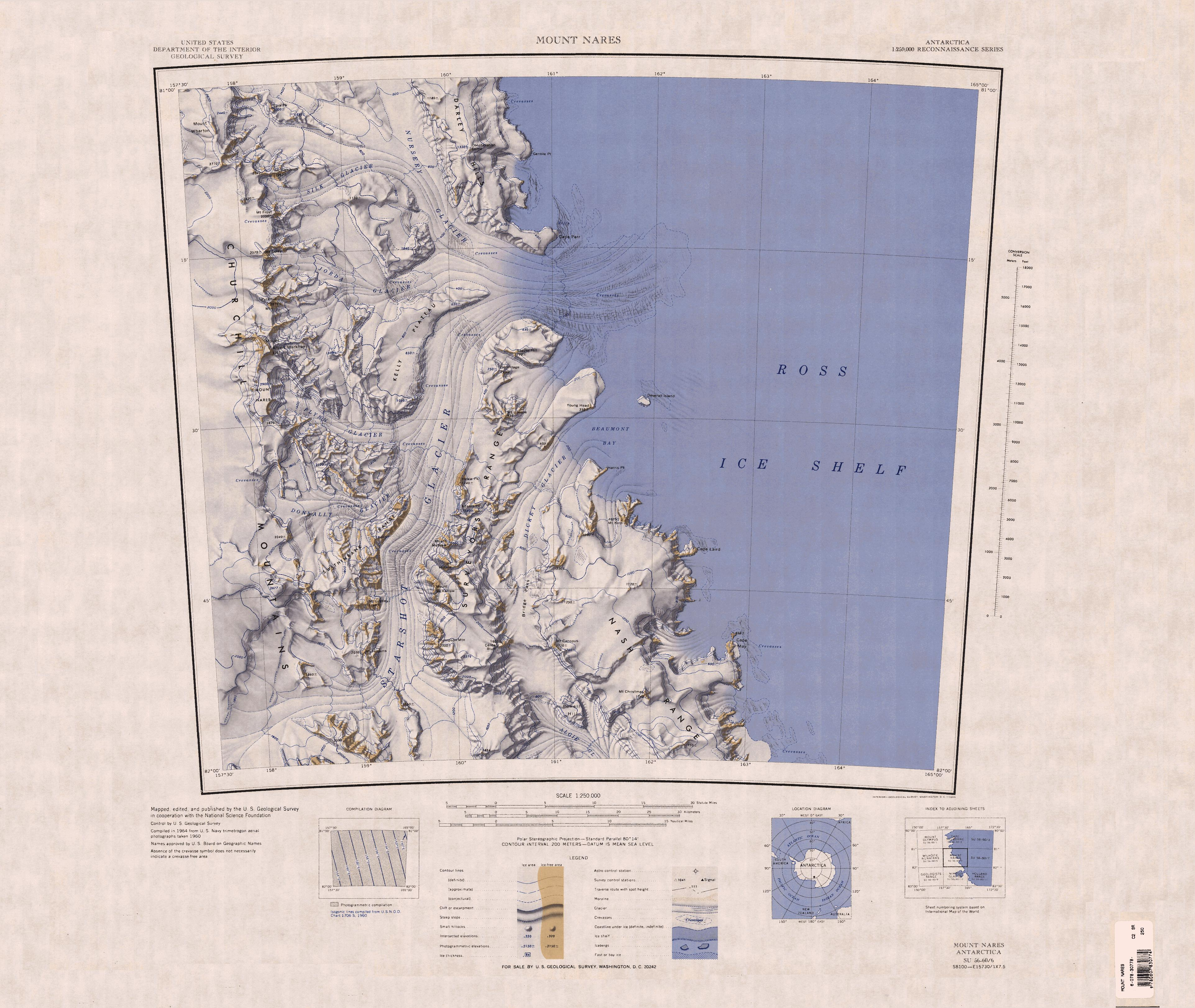
Map sheet showing Beaumont Bay

Beaumont Bay (81°31′S 161°22′E) is a reentrant on the west side of the Ross Ice Shelf between Young Head and Harris Point. The Dickey Glacier flows into Beaumont Bay on its way to the Ross Ice Shelf, filling much of the Bay with ice. It was discovered by the British National Antarctic Expedition (1901–04) and named for Admiral Sir Lewis Beaumont, Royal Navy, an Arctic explorer who took a special interest in this expedition.

== See also ==
- Howard-Williams Point
