= Holyoake Range =

Mountain range in Antarctica

- Location within Antarctica

Highest point
- Peak: Mount Hunt
- Elevation: 3,240 m (10,630 ft)
- Prominence: 1,252 m (4,108 ft)
- Listing: Ribu

Geography
- Location: Antarctica
- Region: Ross Dependency
- Range coordinates: 82°13′S 160°0′E

Holyoake Range (82°13′S 160°0′E) is a mountain range in the Ross Dependency of Antarctica. It is in the southern section of the Churchill Mountains, part of the Transantarctic Mountains System.

== Location ==
The range extends in a northwest–southeast direction for about 25 nautical miles (46 km). The Starshot Glacier runs east past the north of the range. The Prince Philip Glacier runs south-south-east along the range's west side, and the Errant Glacier runs south-south-east along its east side. Both join the Nimrod Glacier, which runs northeast past the range's south end. The Cobham Range is to the west, on the other side of the Prince Philip Glacier.

== Topology and Geology ==
The Holyoake Range is a largely ice-free limestone massif. It is 6 miles (9.7 km) wide on average. The peaks rise steadily from Cambrian Bluff in the south at 4,880 feet (1,490 m) to Mount Hunt further north at 10,525 feet (3,208 m). The range rises abruptly from the bordering glaciers and has a subrectangular plan. This suggests it gained its present form from block faulting during the Victoria Orogeny.

The bulk of the Holyoake and Swithinbank Ranges are made up of the Shackleton Limestone formation, which lies unconformably on an unweathered surface cut across beds of the Goldie Formation north of the Nimrod Glacier. It includes the Cambrian limestone that crops out between the Byrd and Nimrod Glaciers and in the upper Beardmore Glacier.

== Name ==
The Holyoake Range was named by the New Zealand Antarctic Place-Names Committee (NZ-APC) for the Rt. Hon. Keith Holyoake who, first as Minister of Agriculture, then as Prime Minister, and later as Leader of the Opposition, gave strong support to New Zealand participation in the Commonwealth Trans-Antarctic Expedition of 1956–58.

== Glaciers ==
=== Prince Philip Glacier ===
82°21′S 159°55′E. Glacier flowing south for about 20 miles (32 km) between Cobham and Holyoake Ranges into Nimrod Glacier. Named by the NZ-APC for Prince Philip, Duke of Edinburgh, husband of Queen Elizabeth II.

=== Errant Glacier ===
82°21′S 160°58′E. Glacier, 15 miles (24 km) long, which lies on the east side of Holyoake Range and drains south into Nimrod Glacier. This glacier offered a route to the southern party of the New Zealand Geological Survey Antarctic Expedition (NZGSAE) (1960–61) when they journeyed north from Nimrod Glacier in December 1960. Named by them to describe the zigzag route of the party in traveling on the glacier in search for a route north.

== Features ==
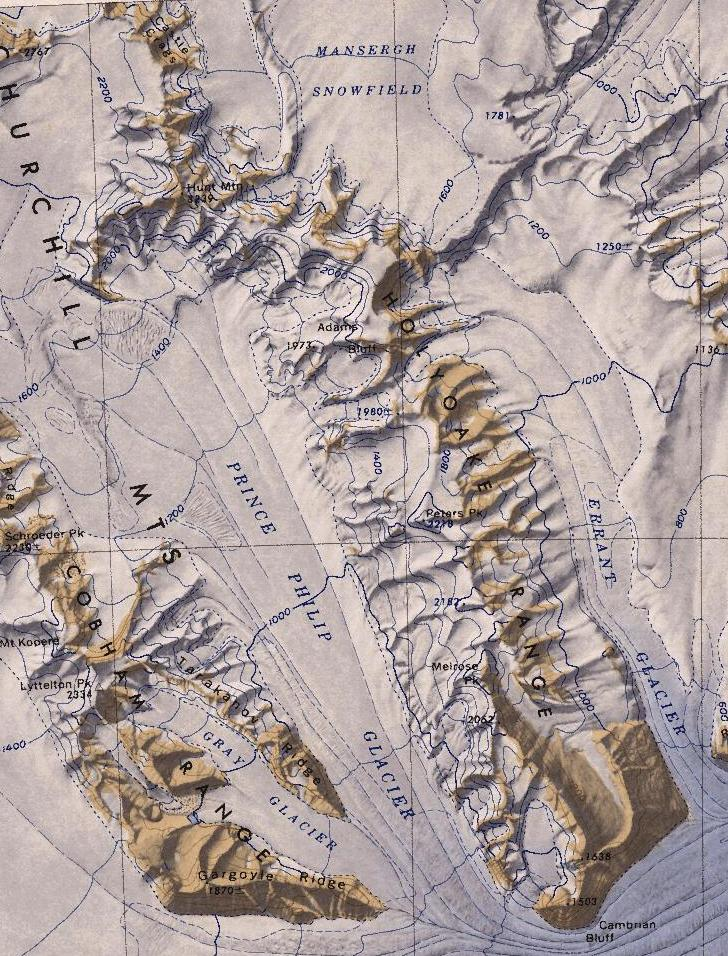
Holyoake Range

Geographical features from north to south include:

=== Mount Richter ===
81°58′S 158°47′E. A mountain rising to 2,550 metres (8,370 ft) between Gutenberg Glacier and upper Starshot Glacier in north Holyoake Range, Churchill Mountains. The mountain is 5 kilometres (3.1 mi) north of Cerberus Peak. Named after Charles Francis Richter, American physicist, California Institute of Technology, 1930–70; in collaboration with Beno Gutenberg, 1935, he developed the Richter Scale which bears his name, used to measure the magnitude of earthquakes.

=== Cerberus Peak ===
82.0166667°S 158.7666667°E A prominent peak, 2,765 metres (9,072 ft) high, at the head of Prince Philip Glacier, 6 nautical miles (11 km; 6.9 mi) northwest of Hunt Mountain. The name was suggested by the Holyoake, Cobham and Queen Elizabeth Ranges Party of the New Zealand Geological Survey Antarctic Expedition (NZGSAE), 1964-65. Named after Cerberus, three-headed canine guardian of the gate to Hades in Greek mythology.

=== Castle Crags ===
82°01′S 159°12′E. Prominent jagged peaks 4 miles (6.4 km) north of Hunt Mountain, on the ridge extending north from the Holyoake Range. Named by the NZGSAE (1964–65) for their castellated appearance.

=== Hunt Mountain ===
82°05′S 159°16′E. Mountain, 3,240 metres (10,630 ft) high, which stands in the north part of the Holyoake Range and is its highest point. Mapped by the southern party of the NZGSAE (1960-61) and named for Capt. P.J. Hunt, RE, leader of the party. Not: Mount Hunt.

=== Stark Ridge ===
81.9666667°S 159.5166667°E. A narrow ridge that extends from the east part of Hunt Mountain, and trends north for 11 miles (18 km) to the sharp north-north-east turn in Starshot Glacier. Several summits rise from the ridge which separates Sivjee Glacier and Mansergh Snowfield. Named by Advisory Committee on Antarctic Names (US-ACAN) after Antony A. Stark, Smithsonian Astrophysical Observatory, Cambridge, MA; U.S. Antarctic Project (USAP) principal investigator for the Antarctic submillimeter telescope and remote observatory at the South Pole, 1991-2002.

=== Adams Bluff ===
82°09′S 159°55′E. A bluff standing 5 miles (8.0 km) north of Peters Peak in the Holyoake Range of the Churchill Mountains. Mapped by the USGS from tellurometer surveys and Navy air photos, 1960–62. Named by US-ACAN for Paul L. Adams, USARP meteorologist at Byrd Station, 1961–62, 1962–63, and at McMurdo Station, 1963-64, 1964-65.

=== Peters Peak ===
82°14′S 160°04′E. Snow-covered peak, 2,220 metres (7,280 ft) high, standing 4 miles (6.4 km) north of Melrose Peak in the central part of Holyoake Range. Mapped by the USGS from tellurometer surveys and Navy air photos, 1960-62. Named by US-ACAN for Merrill J. Peters, USARP field assistant, 1962–63.

=== Melrose Peak ===
82°19′S 160°14′E A peak 4 mi S of Peters Peak in the Holyoake Range. Mapped by the USGS from tellurometer surveys and Navy air photos, 1960–62. Named by US-ACAN for Robert L. Melrose, USARP meteorologist at Hallett Station, 1963–64.

=== Cambrian Bluff ===
82°25′S 160°33′E. Prominent bluff jutting into the north side of Nimrod Glacier and forming the south end of the Holyoake Range. Named by the southern party of the NZGSAE (1960–61) because the bluff is faced with vast seams of pink and white marble.

== Nearby features ==
=== Mansergh Snowfield ===
82°01′S 159°50′E. A snowfield feeding the central portion of the Starshot Glacier, separating the Surveyors and Holyoake Ranges. Seen by the Holyoake, Cobham and Queen Elizabeth Ranges party of the NZGSAE (1964-65) and named for G. Mansergh, geologist with the party.

== Sources ==
- Alberts, Fred G., ed. (1995), Geographic Names of the Antarctic (PDF) (2 ed.), United States Board on Geographic Names This article incorporates public domain material from websites or documents of the United States Board on Geographic Names.
- Laird, M. G. (1963), "Geomorphology and stratigraphy of the nimrod glacier–beaumont bay region, Southern Victoria land, Antarctica", New Zealand Journal of Geology and Geophysics, 6 (3): 465–484, doi:10.1080/00288306.1963.10422076
- Laird, M. G; Mansergh, G. D.; Chappell, J. M. A. (1971), "Geology of the Central Nimrod Glacier area, Antarctica", New Zealand Journal of Geology and Geophysics, 14 (3): 427–468, doi:10.1080/00288306.1971.10421939
- Mount Richter, AADC Australian Antarctic Data Centrec
- Mount Nares, USGS United States Geologic Survey, 1960
- Nimrod Glacier, USGS United States Geologic Survey, 1960
- "Stark Ridge", Geographic Names Information System, United States Geological Survey, United States Department of the Interior
