= All-Blacks Nunataks =

Mountain range in Antarctica

- Location within Antarctica

Highest point
- Coordinates: 81°29′S 155°45′E

Geography
- Continent: Antarctica
- Region: Ross Dependency
- Parent range: Churchill Mountains

All-Blacks Nunataks (81°29′S 155°45′E) is a group of conspicuous nunataks lying midway between Wallabies Nunataks and Wilhoite Nunataks at the southeast margin of the Byrd Névé in Antarctica. Named by the New Zealand Geological Survey Antarctic Expedition (1960–61) after the well-known New Zealand national rugby union team.

== Location ==
The All-Blacks Nunataks are to the southeast of the Byrd Névé and the Lonewolf Nunataks. The All-Blacks Nunataks and the Wallabies Nunataks bind the Chapman Snowfield, which lies further to the east. The Bledisloe Glacier flows to the Byrd Névé between All-Blacks Nunataks and Wallabies Nunataks, and the Skellerup Glacier flows to the Byrd Névé between All-Blacks Nunataks and Wilhoite Nunataks.

== Features ==
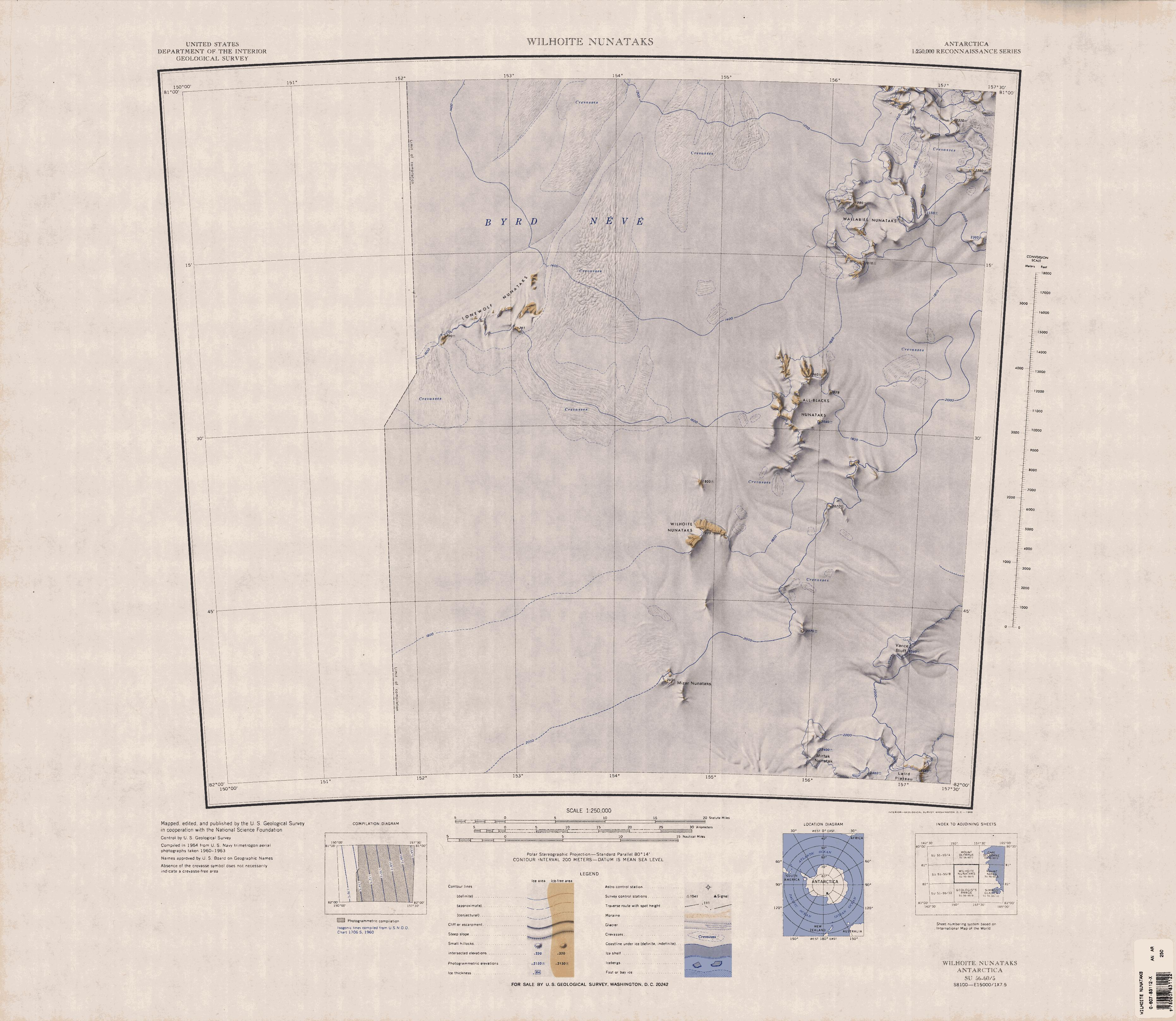
Byrd Névé to the northwest, All-Blacks Nunataks east of center

=== Alexander Cone ===
1,978-metre (6,490 ft). A cone-shaped feature in the All-Blacks Nunataks. It was named in honor of John Alexander, involved in operational work at Cape Hallett, Scott Base and the Cape Roberts Project for many years, from 1984 onwards.

=== Geddes Crag ===
81°32′S 155°47′E. A crag immediately south of the All-Blacks Nunataks, 10 kilometres (6 mi) northwest of Rutland Nunatak, in Antarctica. It was named in honor of Dave Geddes, who was involved in operational work for the Department of Scientific and Industrial Research Antarctic Division and the New Zealand Antarctic Research Programme from 1986 to 1995.

=== MacFarlane Bluff ===
81°28′S 155°36′E. A bluff reaching to over 1,800 metres (6,000 ft) in the All-Blacks Nunataks. It was named in honor of Malcolm MacFarlane, who worked at Vanda Station, Scott Base and in the Department of Scientific and Industrial Research Antarctic Division, the New Zealand Antarctic Research Programme and for Antarctica New Zealand between 1983 and 1996.

=== Mount Mace ===
81°25′S 155°53′E. A mountain at 1,960 metres (6,430 ft), in the All-Blacks Nunataks. It was named in honor of Chris Mace, Chair of the Antarctica New Zealand Board from its establishment in 1996 until April 2003.

=== Mount Waterhouse ===
81°25′S 155°42′E. A mountain rising above 1,800 metres (5,900 ft), at the north west extreme of the All-Blacks Nunataks. Named in honor of Emma Waterhouse, Environmental Manager with Antarctica New Zealand from 1993 - 2001. First trip to the ice 1987. Emma played a key role in the development of New Zealand systems to implement the Protocol on Environmental Protection to the Antarctic Treaty and its Act.

=== Woodgate Crest ===
81°29′S 155°59′E. A a crest rising to 2,040 metres (6,690 ft), in the All-Blacks Nunataks. Named in honor of Paul Woodgate MNZM, Antarctica New Zealand employee from 1981–present, currently Movements Controller. Paul plays a key role for all travelers to the ice with New Zealand's program, handling cargo and passenger movements.

== Nearby features ==
=== Wilhoite Nunataks ===
81°39′S 154°55′E. Group of dark rock nunataks near the polar plateau, about 12 miles (19 km) southwest of All-Blacks Nunataks. Named by US-ACAN after the USS Wilhoite, radar picket escort vessel which maintained an ocean station in support of aircraft flights between New Zealand and Antarctica in USN OpDFrz 1961.

=== Wallabies Nunataks ===
81°12′S 156°20′E. A large group of nunataks near the polar plateau, lying 10 miles (16 km) northeast of All-Blacks Nunataks at the east side of the Byrd Névé. Named by the NZGSAE (1960–61) for the well known Australian rugby team.

=== Fraser Nunatak ===
81°47′S 155°55′E. A nunatak in Oates Land, Antarctica rising to 2,070 metres (6,800 ft). It lies approximately 22 kilometres (14 mi) south east (Note: The Geographic Names Information System entry states that the Fraser Nunatak is "south west" of Wilhoite Nunataks. However, Fraser's coordinates in that database are exactly one degree of longitude east of that of the Wilhoite Nunataks. The statement in this article corrects the GNIS error.) of the Wilhoite Nunataks and 25 kilometres (16 mi) west of the Churchill Mountains. The peak is approximately 400 kilometres (250 mi) south of McMurdo Station, and 150 kilometres (93 mi) west of the Ross Ice Shelf. The Fraser Nunatak was named in honor of Graham Fraser, who has had some 45 years of Antarctic experience and led geomagnetic pulsation research over 11 seasons from 1989 onwards.

=== Mizar Nunataks ===
81°52′S 154°35′E Small cluster of rock nunataks near the polar plateau, 12 miles (19 km) south of Wilhoite Nunataks. Named by US-ACAN after the USNS Mizar, cargo vessel in the U.S. convoy to McMurdo Sound in USN OpDFrz, 1962.

=== Lonewolf Nunataks ===
81°20′S 152°50′E A group of isolated nunataks lying 25 nautical miles (46 km) northwest of the Wilhoite Nunataks, at the south side of Byrd Névé. They were so named by the New Zealand Geological Survey Antarctic Expedition (1960–61) because of their isolation.

=== Vance Bluff ===
81°49′S 156°55′E. A small ice-covered eminence near the polar plateau, 10 miles (16 km) north of Laird Plateau. Its flat summit merges with the ice sheet to the north and west, but there is a steep cliff along the south side. Named by US-ACAN for the USS Vance, ocean station ship in support of aircraft flights between New Zealand and McMurdo Sound during USN OpDFrz 1962.

== Sources ==
- Alberts, Fred G., ed. (1995), Geographic Names of the Antarctic (PDF) (2 ed.), United States Board on Geographic Names This article incorporates public domain material from websites or documents of the United States Board on Geographic Names.
- "Alexander Cone", Geographic Names Information System, United States Geological Survey, United States Department of the Interior
- "Bledisloe Glacier", Geographic Names Information System, United States Geological Survey, United States Department of the Interior
- "Chapman Snowfield", Geographic Names Information System, United States Geological Survey, United States Department of the Interior
- "Fraser Nunatak", Geographic Names Information System, United States Geological Survey, United States Department of the Interior
- "Geddes Crag", Geographic Names Information System, United States Geological Survey, United States Department of the Interior
- "MacFarlane Bluff", Geographic Names Information System, United States Geological Survey, United States Department of the Interior
- "Mount Mace", Geographic Names Information System, United States Geological Survey, United States Department of the Interior
- "Mount Waterhouse", Geographic Names Information System, United States Geological Survey, United States Department of the Interior
- "Skellerup Glacier", Geographic Names Information System, United States Geological Survey, United States Department of the Interior
- Wilhoite Nunataks, USGS, 1968.
- "Woodgate Crest", Geographic Names Information System, United States Geological Survey, United States Department of the Interior
