= Scott Nunataks =

Coordinates: 77°14′S 154°12′W

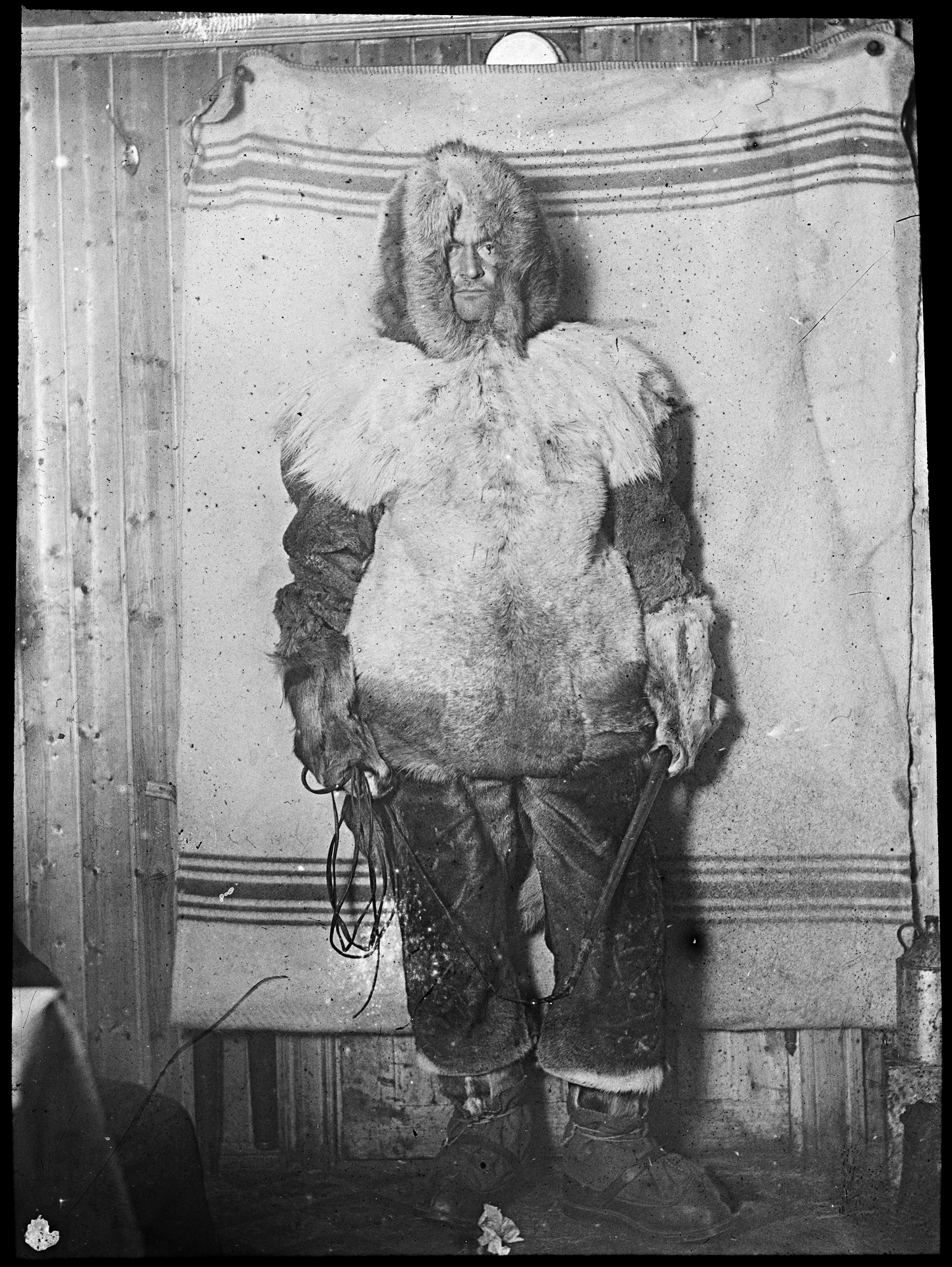
1911 portrait of Kristian Prestrud who named the nunataks and erected a cairn at the site

The Scott Nunataks are a group of conspicuous nunataks lying about 18 km east of the Richter Glacier and forming the northern end of the Alexandra Mountains in King Edward VII Land, Antarctica.

== History ==
The formation was discovered in 1902 by the British National Antarctic Expedition under Captain Robert Falcon Scott. It was named after Scott by Lieutenant Kristian Prestrud, leader of the Eastern Sledge Party of Amundsen's South Pole expedition (1910–1912), who ascended the nunataks while exploring Edward VII Peninsula in 1911.

=== Historic monument ===
Prestrud's Cairn is a small rock cairn erected at the foot of the main bluff on the northern side of the nunataks on 3 December 1911 by Prestrud during Amundsen's expedition. It has been designated a Historic Site or Monument (HSM 66), following a proposal by New Zealand, Norway and the United Kingdom to the Antarctic Treaty Consultative Meeting.
