= Kristian Prestrud =

Norwegian naval officer and polar explorer

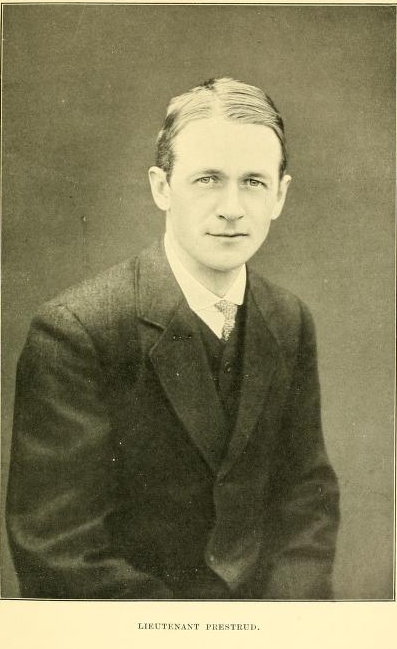
Kristian Prestrud

Kristian Prestrud (22 October 1881 – 11 November 1927) was a Norwegian naval officer and polar explorer who participated in Amundsen's South Pole expedition between 1910 and 1912. Prestrud was first officer of the Fram and leader of the Norwegian expedition's Eastern Sledge Party to the Scott Nunataks.

== Background ==
Kristian Prestrud was born in the parish of Grue in Hedmark, Norway and was baptized in Grue Church during January 1882. His father was a distillery manager in Løten. Krsitian Prestrud left for the sea in 1896. He entered at the Naval Academy at Karljohansvern in Horten during 1898. He became second lieutenant in 1902 and first lieutenant in 1905. After leaving the academy he sailed in the merchant fleet.

== Amundsen's South Pole expedition ==
Roald Amundsen was secretive about his real attentions with regards of the Fram expeditions, the only persons to know in advance were his brother, and the ship's commander, Lieutenant Thorvald Nilsen. Lieutenant Prestrud and one other of the crew, Hjalmar Fredrik Gjertsen (1885-1958), were trusted with the information on the eve of the Fram's departure from Norway. The rest of the crew of 18 was only to know upon Fram's stop-over at Madeira. During the winter stay at Framheim in Antarctica Prestrud, assisted by Hjalmar Johansen, made scientific observations.

Prestrud was assigned to the original group of eight men that made the unsuccessful attempt to reach the Pole on 8 September 1911. Although they were forced to retreat due to extreme temperatures, they decided to head for the depot at 80°, unload their sledges and race back to Framheim. The disordered return was made in scattered groups, with the last two men arriving more than six hours after the others. Johansen and Prestrud stumbled into Framheim totally exhausted, having found the camp in the dark and fog only by following the barking of the dogs. It is likely that Prestrud would have frozen to death if Johansen had not taken care of him and brought him to safety.

The next morning Amundsen was heavily criticised by Johansen, who had experience from his Arctic exploration with Fridtjof Nansen. Such opposition was unheard-of and Amundsen then reorganized the Pole party by reducing its number. Consequently, Johansen, together with Prestrud and Stubberud was separated from the Pole team and tasked with the exploration of King Edward VII Land. In order to dishonor Johansen further, the less experienced Prestrud was put in charge of this. A cairn erected by Prestrud's group at Scott Nunataks, Alexandra Mountains (77°11′S 154°32′W) on 3 December 1911 is considered a historic site of Antarctica.

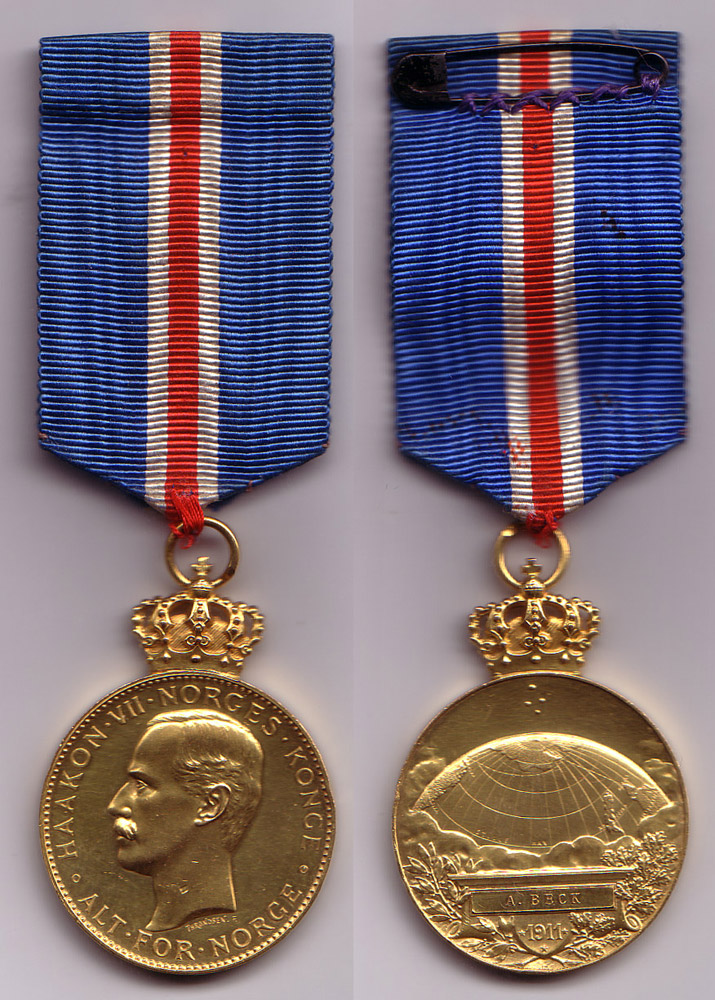
South Pole Medal

== In popular culture ==
Prestrud was portrayed by Bjørn Skagestad in the 1985 television serial The Last Place on Earth, and by Herbert Nordrum in the 2019 film Amundsen.

== See also ==
- Mount Prestrud
- Prestrud Inlet
