= Leif Dietrichson =

Norwegian aviation pioneer

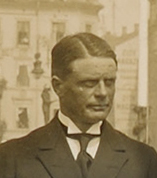
- Born: Leif Ragnar Dietrichson; 1 September 1890; Hønefoss, Norway
- Disappeared: 18 June 1928 (aged 37); Barents Sea
- Education: Aviator
- Occupations: Norwegian military officer and Arctic explorer
- Parents: Kristian Dietrichson (father); Birgitte Lynum (mother)

Leif Dietrichson (1 September 1890 – disappeared 18 June 1928) was a Norwegian military officer and aviation pioneer. He is most famous for joining Roald Amundsen and Lincoln Ellsworth in the 1925 North Pole Expedition. In 1928, Dietrichson disappeared with Amundsen and four others as they travelled in their flying boat to join the search for survivors of the crash of the airship Italia during the expedition of Umberto Nobile.

== Early life ==
Leif Ragnar Dietrichson was born at Hønefoss in Buskerud, Norway. He was the son of Dr. Kristian Adolf Gustav Emil Dietrichson (1858–96) and Birgitte Lynum (1860–1940). He was a cousin of Bernt Balchen, and nephew of Oluf Christian Dietrichson, who had been with the Fridtjof Nansen expedition to Greenland (1888–89).

== Career ==
In 1911, Dietrichson became a commander with the in Bergen Steamship Company (Det Bergenske Dampskibsselskap). When the Norwegian Navy Air Force was established in 1915, he became one of the pioneers. He started flying in 1916 and traveled to the United Kingdom in the spring of 1918 for further training. Later that year he became chief of the plane boat station in Kristiansand, a position he had until he died.

Dietrichson participated in Roald Amundsen's North Pole expedition in 1925, which reached 87° 43' N.On 21 1925 May two Dornier Wal aircraft boats, N-24 and N-25, took off from Ny-Ålesund on the island of Spitsbergen. N 24 was led by Dietrichson, with Lincoln Ellesworth as a navigator and Oskar Omdal as a mechanic. N 25 was led by Hjalmar Riiser-Larsen, with Roald Amundsen as a navigator and Karl Feucht as a mechanic. After 7 hours of flight, the expedition made an emergency landing due to motor difficulties. N-24 landed but was damaged. After 25 days the six man crew managed to fly back to Svalbard in the N-25.

== Disappearance ==
Dietrichson disappeared together with a five-man crew on 18 June 1928 during the Roald Amundsen-led rescue mission searching for Umberto Nobile and his crew of the missing airship Italia.

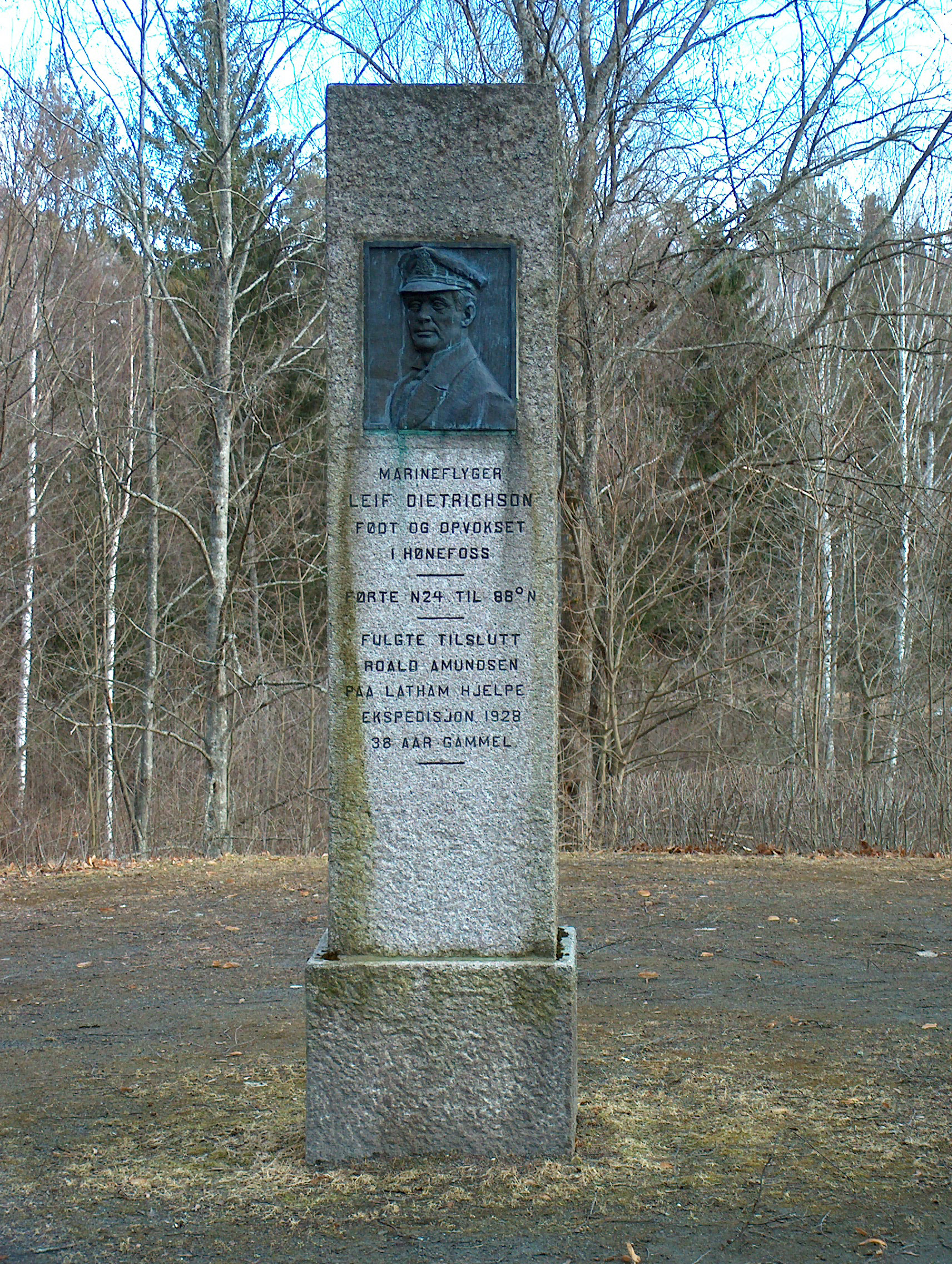
Leif Dietrichson memorial at Søndre park in Hønefoss

== See also ==
- List of people who disappeared

== Related reading ==
- Cross, Wilbur (2000) Disaster at the Pole. The tragedy of the airship Italia and the 1928 Nobile Expedition to the North Pole (Guilford, Conn: Lyons Press) ISBN 9781585744961
