= Butler Glacier =

Glacier in Antarctica

- Location within Antarctica
- Location: King Edward VII Land
- Coordinates: 77°24′S 152°42′W
- Terminus: Sulzberger Bay

The Butler Glacier (77°24′S 152°42′W) is a broad glacier draining the north side of Edward VII Peninsula in the vicinity of Clark Peak, and flowing generally northeastward through the Alexandra Mountains to its terminus in Sulzberger Bay.

== Mapping and name ==
The Butler Glacier was mapped by the United States Geological Survey (USGS) from surveys and from United States Navy air photographs (1959–65). It was named by the United States Advisory Committee on Antarctic Names (US-ACAN) for Lieutenant F.M. Butler, United States Navy, expedition navigator in charge of all navigation watch sections on USS Glacier during the exploration of this area in January 1962.

== Location ==
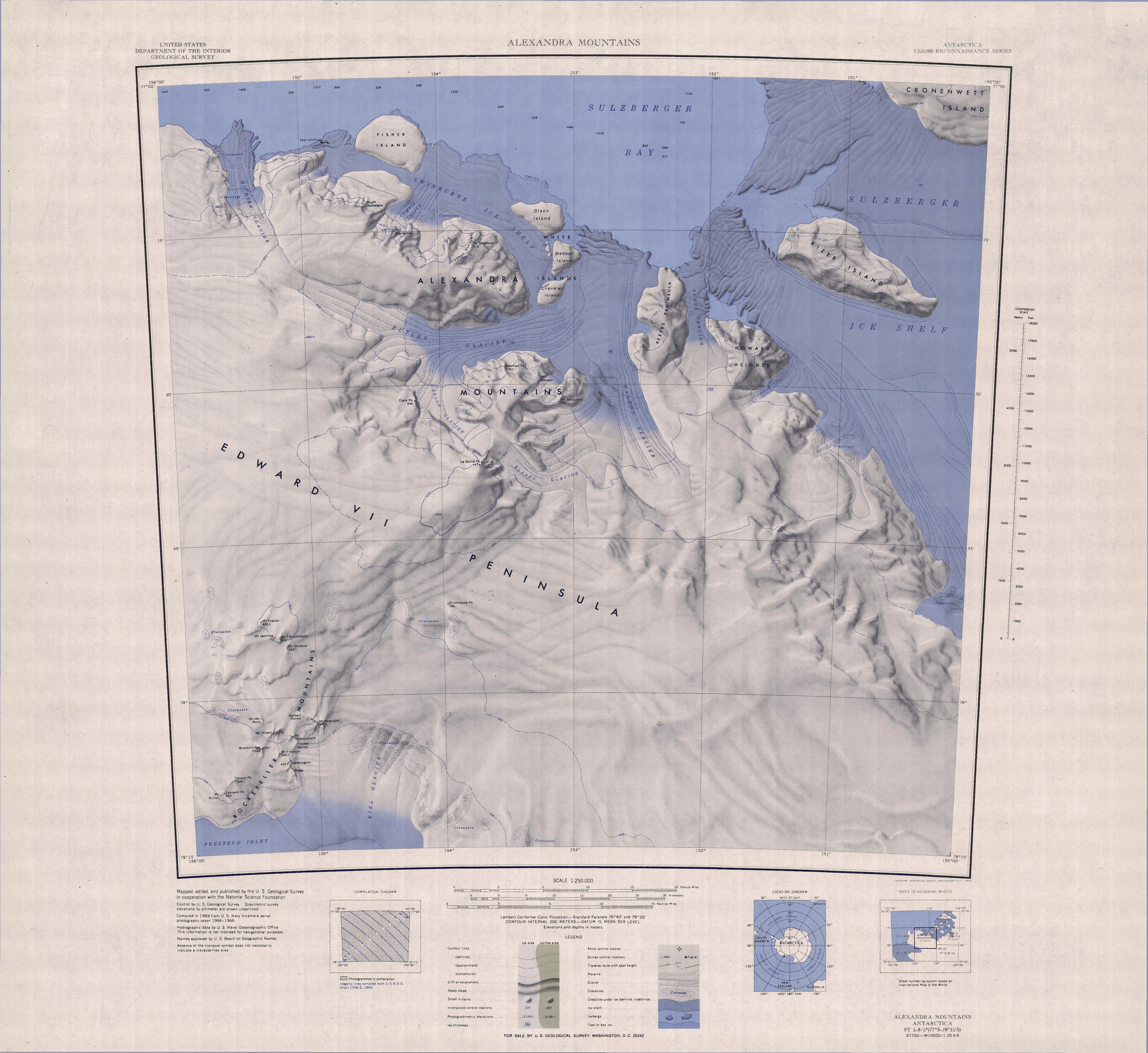
Butler Glacier to north of center of map

Butler Glacier flow from west to east through the Alexandra Mountains from a saddle it shares with Richter Glacier, which flows northwest. It is joined from the south by Larson Glacier, which flows from La Gorce Peak from a saddle with Blades Glacier. Towards its mouth it is joined from the south by Dalton Glacier. The combined streams flow north between the White Islands and Reeves Peninsula to enter Sulzberger Bay.

== Tributaries ==
=== Larson Glacier ===
77°28′S 154°00′W. A tributary glacier that drains northwest from La Gorce Peak in the Alexandra Mountains and enters the south side of Butler Glacier. Mapped by USGS from surveys and United States Navy air photos, 1959-65. Named by US-AC AN for helicopter pilot Lieutenant Commander Conrad S. Larson, United States Navy, officer in charge of the helicopter detachment aboard the icebreaker Eastwind during Operation Deep Freeze, 1955-56.

=== Dalton Glacier ===
77°33′S 152°25′W. A broad glacier on the east side of the Alexandra Mountains on Edward VII Peninsula, flowing northward into Butler Glacier just south of Sulzberger Bay. Mapped from surveys by the USGS and United States Navy air photos (1959-65). Named by US-ACAN for Lieutenant Brian C. Dalton, MC, United States Navy, officer in charge at Byrd Station, 1957.

=== Blades Glacier ===
77°38′S 153°00′W. A glacier flowing east from the snow-covered saddle just north of La Gorce Peak, Alexandra Mountains. It merges with Dalton Glacier on the north side of Edward VII Peninsula. Mapped by USGS from surveys and United States Navy air photos, 1959-65. Named by US-ACAN for William Robert Blades who served as navigator during United States Navy Operation Highjump (1946-47) and Operation Deep Freeze (1955-59).

== Sources ==
- Alberts, Fred G., ed. (1995), Geographic Names of the Antarctic (PDF) (2 ed.), United States Board on Geographic Names This article incorporates public domain material from websites or documents of the United States Board on Geographic Names.
- Alexandra Mountains, USGS: United States Geological Survey
- This article incorporates public domain material from websites or documents of the United States Geological Survey.
