= Roald Amundsen =

Norwegian polar explorer (1872–1928)

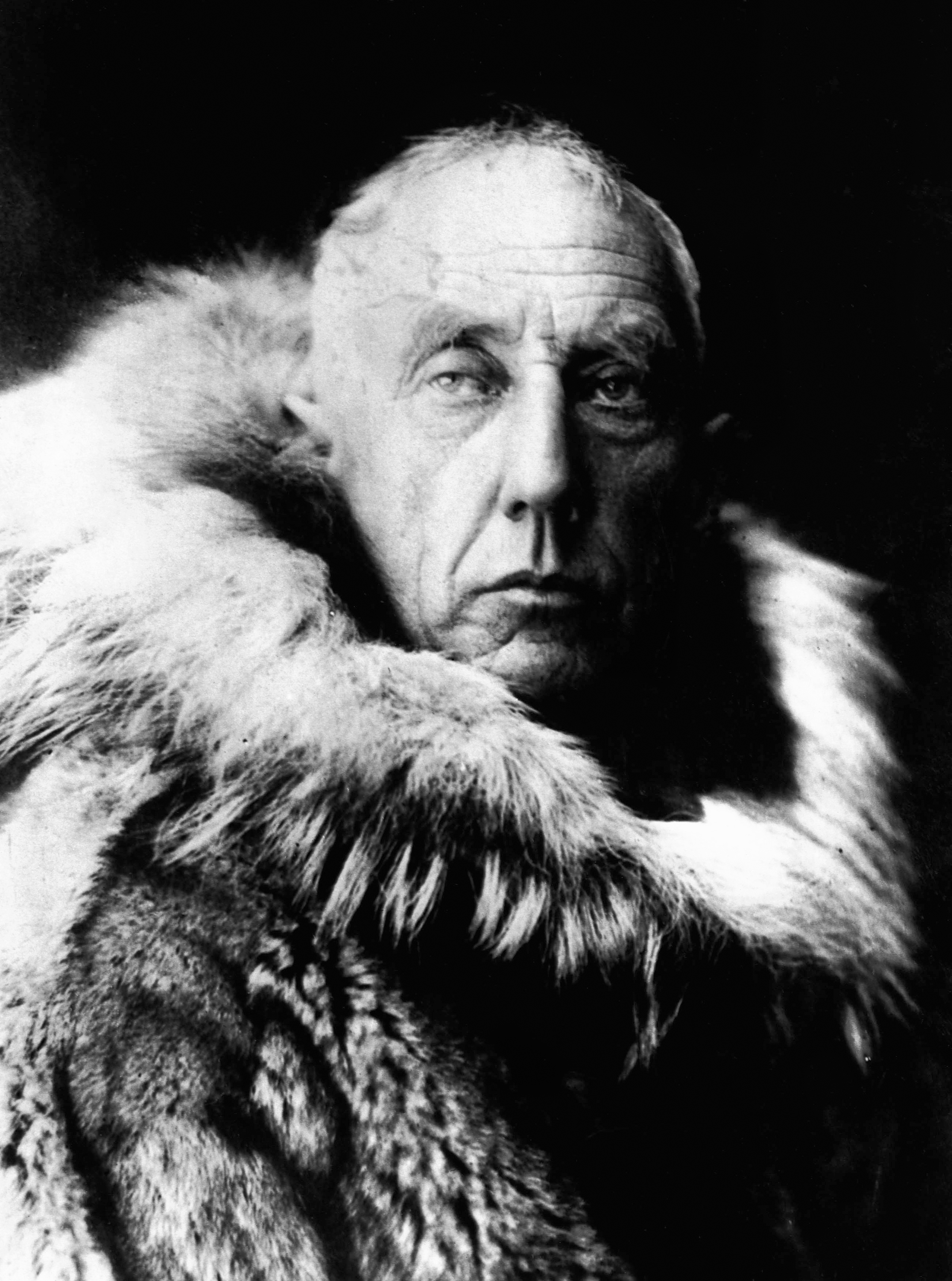
- Amundsen c. 1923
- Born: Roald Engelbregt Gravning Amundsen; 16 July 1872; Borge, Østfold, Norway
- Disappeared: 18 June 1928 (aged 55); Barents Sea
- Occupation: Explorer
- Known for: First to reach the South Pole and the North Pole; First to navigate the Northwest Passage
- Awards: Order of St. Olav (1906); Hubbard Medal (1907); Order of Franz Joseph (1907); Charles P. Daly Medal (1912); Vega Medal (1913); Congressional Gold Medal (1928)

Roald Engelbregt Gravning Amundsen (UK: /ˈɑːmʊndsən/, US: /-məns-/; Norwegian: [ˈrùːɑɫ ˈɑ̂mʉnsən]; 16 July 1872 – c. 18 June 1928) was a Norwegian explorer of polar regions. He was a key figure of the period known as the Heroic Age of Antarctic Exploration.

Born in Borge, Østfold, Norway, Amundsen began his career as a polar explorer as first mate on Adrien de Gerlache's Belgian Antarctic Expedition of 1897–1899. From 1903 to 1906, he led the first expedition to successfully traverse the Northwest Passage on the sloop Gjøa. In 1909, Amundsen began planning for a South Pole expedition. He left Norway in June 1910 on the ship Fram and reached Antarctica in January 1911. His party established a camp at the Bay of Whales and a series of supply depots on the Barrier (now known as the Ross Ice Shelf) before setting out for the pole in October. The party of five, led by Amundsen, became the first to reach the South Pole on 14 December 1911.

Following a failed attempt in 1918 to reach the North Pole by traversing the Northeast Passage on the ship Maud, Amundsen began planning for an aerial expedition instead. On 12 May 1926, Amundsen and 15 other men in the airship Norge became the first explorers verified to have reached the North Pole. Amundsen disappeared in June 1928 while flying on a rescue mission for the airship Italia in the Arctic. The search for his remains, which have not been found, was called off that September.

== Early life ==
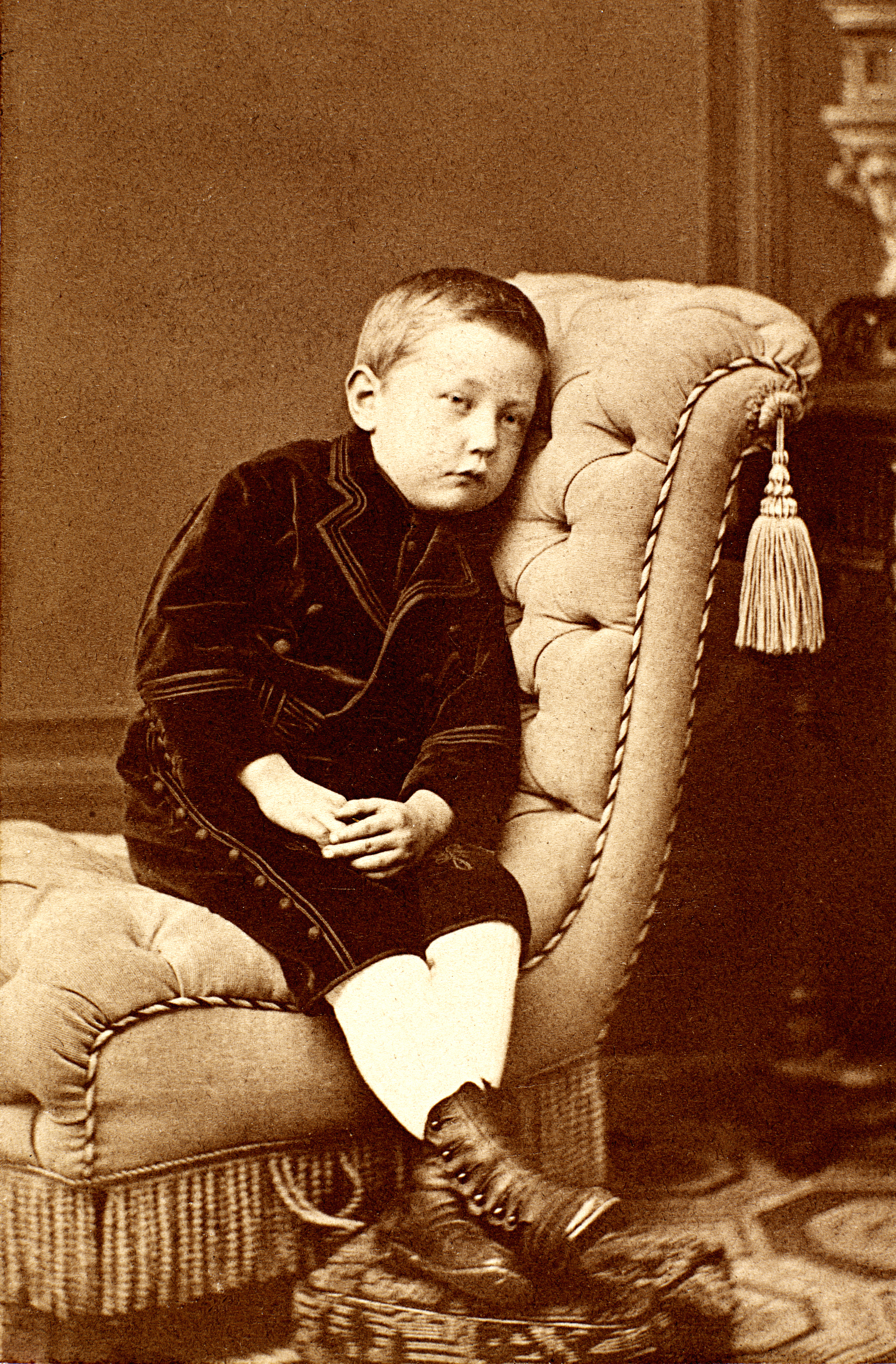
Roald Amundsen as a young boy in 1875

Amundsen was born into a family of Norwegian shipowners and captains in Borge, between the towns Fredrikstad and Sarpsborg. His parents were Jens Amundsen and Hanna Sahlqvist. Roald was the fourth son in the family. His mother wanted him to avoid the family maritime trade and encouraged him to become a doctor, a promise that Amundsen kept until his mother died when he was aged 21. He promptly quit university for a life at sea.

Amundsen was in the Uranienborg neighbourhood an occasional childhood playmate of the pioneering Antarctica explorer Carsten Borchgrevink.

When he was fifteen years old, Amundsen was enthralled by reading Sir John Franklin's narratives of his overland Arctic expeditions. Amundsen wrote "I read them with a fervid fascination which has shaped the whole course of my life".

== Polar treks ==
=== Belgian Antarctic Expedition ===
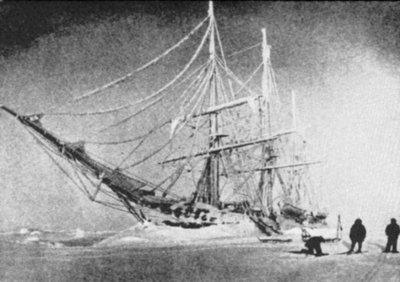
RV Belgica frozen in the ice, 1898

Amundsen joined the Belgian Antarctic Expedition as first mate at the age of 25 in 1897. This expedition, led by Adrien de Gerlache using the ship the RV Belgica, became the first expedition to overwinter in Antarctica. The Belgica, whether by mistake or design, became locked in the sea ice at 70°30′S off Alexander Island, west of the Antarctic Peninsula. The crew endured a winter for which they were poorly prepared.

By Amundsen's own estimation, the doctor for the expedition, the American Frederick Cook, probably saved the crew from scurvy by hunting for animals and feeding the crew fresh meat. In cases where citrus fruits are lacking, raw meat – particularly offal – from animals often contains enough vitamin C to prevent scurvy.

=== The Northwest Passage ===
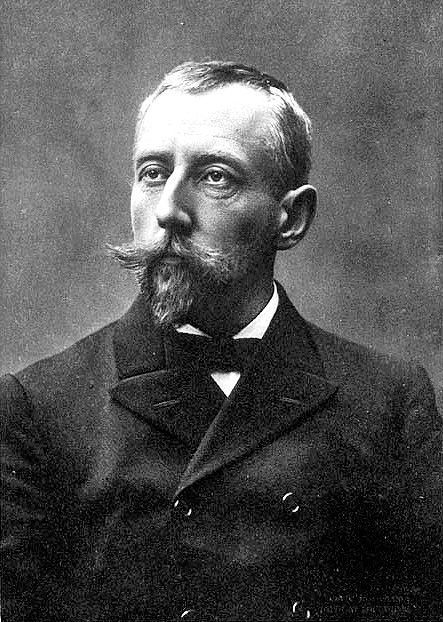
Amundsen c. 1908

In 1903, Amundsen led the first expedition to traverse Canada's Northwest Passage between the Atlantic and Pacific oceans. He planned a small expedition of six men in a 45-ton fishing vessel, Gjøa, to have flexibility. His ship had relatively shallow draft. His technique was to use a small ship and hug the coast. Amundsen had the ship outfitted with a small 13 horsepower single-screw paraffin (diesel) engine.

They travelled via Baffin Bay, the Parry Channel and then south through Peel Sound, James Ross Strait, Simpson Strait and Rae Strait. They spent two winters at King William Island, in the harbour of what is today Gjoa Haven. During this time, Amundsen and the crew learned from the local Netsilik Inuit about Arctic survival skills, which he found invaluable in his later expedition to the South Pole. For example, he learned to use sled dogs for the transport of goods and to wear animal skins in lieu of heavy, woolen parkas, which could not keep out the cold when wet.

Leaving Gjoa Haven, he sailed west and passed Cambridge Bay, which had been reached from the west by Richard Collinson in 1852. Continuing to the south of Victoria Island, the ship cleared the Canadian Arctic Archipelago on 17 August 1905. It had to stop for the winter before going on to Nome on Alaska's Pacific coast. The nearest telegraph station was 500 mi (800 km) away in Eagle. Amundsen travelled there overland to wire a success message on 5 December, then returned to Nome in 1906. While stopped in Alaska, Amundsen had his magnetic instruments (i.e. compasses) adjusted by Don C. Sowers, a physicist from the Carnegie Institution's Department of Terrestrial Magnetism. Later that year Amundsen was elected to the American Antiquarian Society.

Amundsen learned of the dissolution of the union between Norway and Sweden, and that he had a new king. The explorer sent the new king, Haakon VII, news that his traversing the Northwest Passage "was a great achievement for Norway". He said he hoped to do more and signed it "Your loyal subject, Roald Amundsen". The crew returned to Oslo in November 1906, after almost three and a half years abroad. Gjøa was returned to Norway in 1972. After a 45-day trip from San Francisco on a bulk carrier, she was placed on land outside the Fram Museum in Oslo, where she is now situated inside her own building at the museum.

=== South Pole Expedition ===
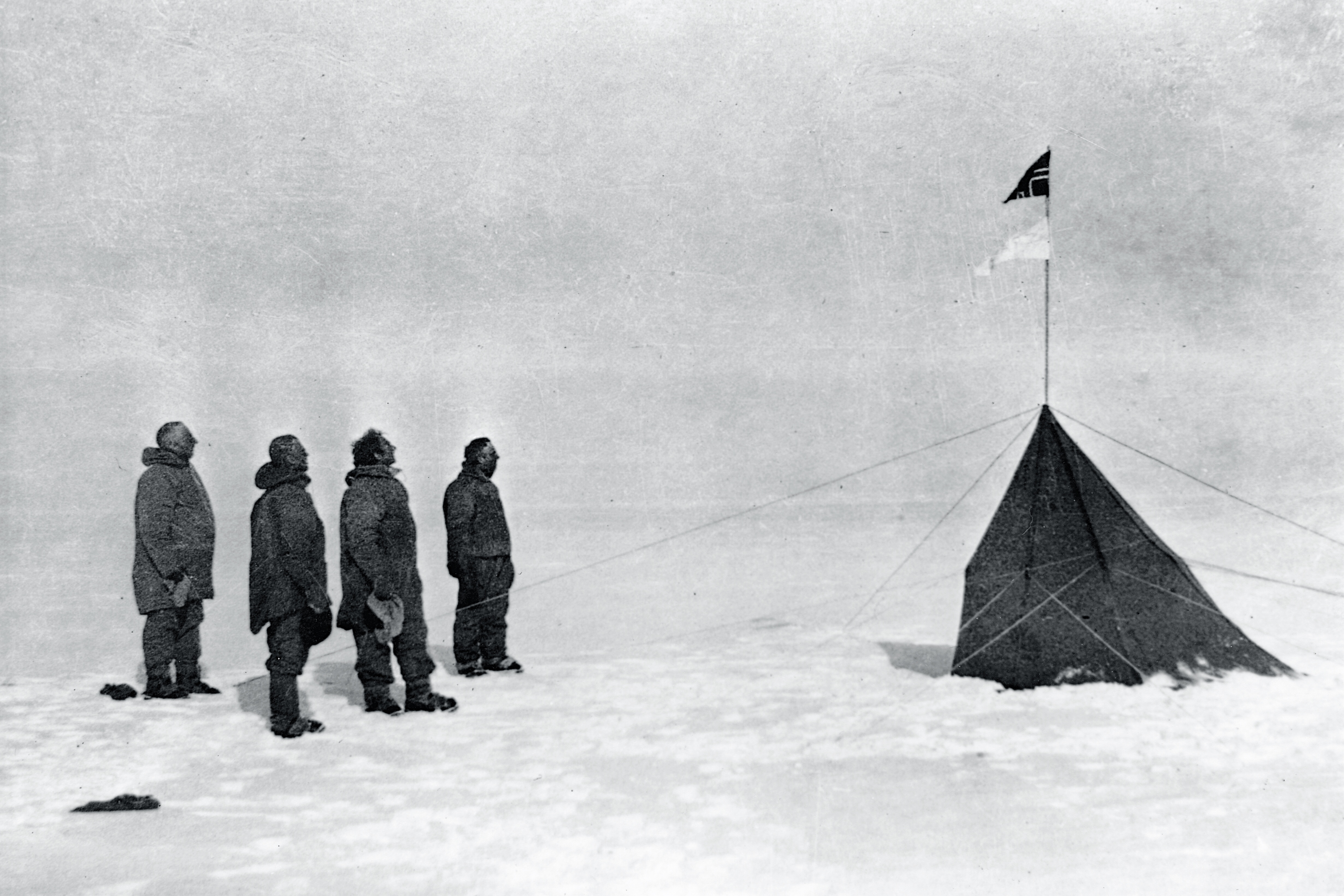
Norwegian flag at the South Pole

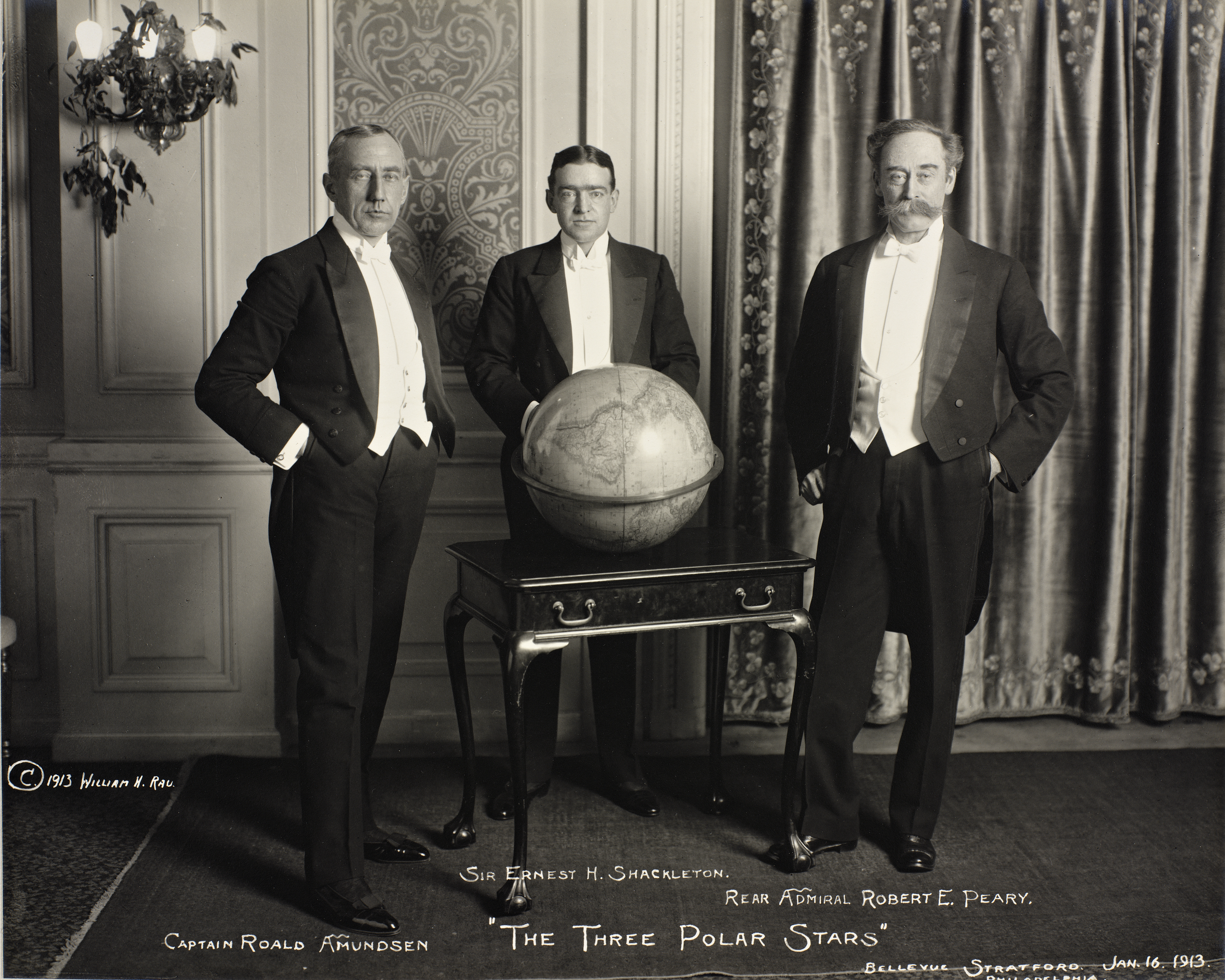
The Three Polar Stars: Amundsen, Ernest Shackleton, and Robert Peary, are pictured in Philadelphia in January 1913

Amundsen next planned to take an expedition to the North Pole and explore the Arctic Basin. Finding it difficult to raise funds, when he heard in 1909 that the Americans Frederick Cook and Robert Peary had claimed to reach the North Pole as a result of two different expeditions, he decided to reroute to Antarctica. He was not clear about his intentions, and Robert F. Scott and the Norwegian supporters felt misled. Scott was planning his own expedition to the South Pole that year. Using the ship Fram, earlier used by Fridtjof Nansen, Amundsen left Oslo for the south on 3 June 1910. At Madeira, Amundsen alerted his men that they would be heading to Antarctica, and sent a telegram to Scott: "Beg to inform you Fram proceeding Antarctic – Amundsen."

Nearly six months later, the expedition arrived at the eastern edge of the Ross Ice Shelf (then known as "the Great Ice Barrier"), at a large inlet called the Bay of Whales, on 14 January 1911. Amundsen established his base camp there, calling it Framheim. Amundsen eschewed the heavy wool clothing worn on earlier Antarctic attempts in favour of adopting Inuit-style furred skins.

Using skis and dog sleds for transportation, Amundsen and his men created supply depots at 80°, 81° and 82° South on the Barrier, along a line directly south to the Pole. Those stores proved inadequate, so Amundsen killed some of the dogs for food, which he later wrote he enjoyed, writing: "it is anything but a real hardship to eat dog flesh." A small group, including Hjalmar Johansen, Kristian Prestrud and Jørgen Stubberud, set out on 8 September, but had to abandon their trek due to extreme temperatures. The painful retreat caused a quarrel within the group, and Amundsen sent Johansen and the other two men to explore King Edward VII Land.

A second attempt, with a team of five made up of Olav Bjaaland, Helmer Hanssen, Sverre Hassel, Oscar Wisting and Amundsen, departed base camp on 19 October. They took four sledges and 52 dogs. Using a route along the previously unknown Axel Heiberg Glacier, they arrived at the edge of the Polar Plateau on 21 November after a four-day climb. The team and 16 dogs arrived at the pole on 14 December, a month before Scott's group. (Note: Some sources give the date as 15 December. Fram crossed the International Date Line shortly before arriving at the Bay of Whales, and thereby "lost" a day. Since the western and eastern hemispheres are conjoined at the South Pole, either date can be considered as correct, though Amundsen gives 14 December, both in his first telegraphed report on arrival in Hobart, and in his fuller account The South Pole.) Amundsen named their South Pole camp Polheim. Amundsen renamed the Antarctic Plateau as King Haakon VII's Plateau. They left a small tent and letter stating their accomplishment, in case they did not return safely to Framheim.

The team arrived at Framheim on 25 January 1912, with 11 surviving dogs. They made their way off the continent and to Hobart, Australia, where Amundsen publicly announced his success on 7 March 1912. He telegraphed news to backers.

Amundsen's expedition benefited from his careful preparation, good equipment, appropriate clothing, a simple primary task, an understanding of dogs and their handling, and the effective use of skis. In contrast to the misfortunes of Scott's team, Amundsen's trek proved relatively smooth and uneventful.

== North Polar Expeditions and the Northeast Passage ==
=== The Northeast Passage ===
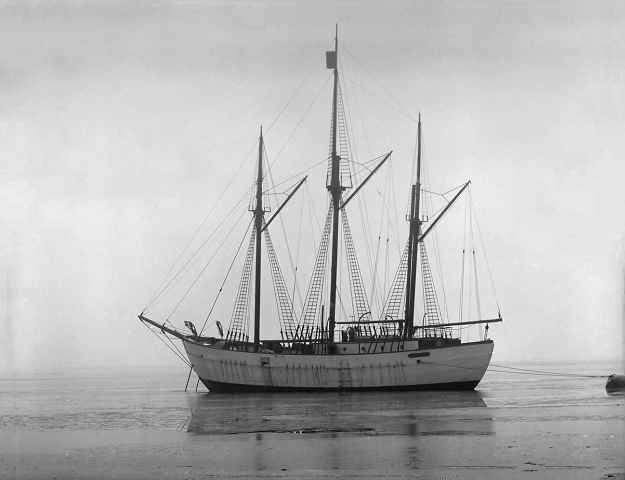
Maud in June 1918

In 1918, an expedition Amundsen began with a new ship, Maud, lasted until 1925. Maud was carefully navigated through the ice west to east through the Northeast Passage. With him on this expedition were Oscar Wisting and Helmer Hanssen, both of whom had been part of the team to reach the South Pole. In addition, Henrik Lindstrøm was included as a cook. He suffered a stroke and was so physically reduced that he could not participate.

The goal of the expedition was to explore the unknown areas of the Arctic Ocean, strongly inspired by Fridtjof Nansen's earlier expedition with Fram. The plan was to sail along the coast of Siberia and go into the ice farther to the north and east than Nansen had. In contrast to Amundsen's earlier expeditions, this was expected to yield more material for academic research, and he carried the geophysicist Harald Sverdrup on board.

The voyage was to the northeasterly direction over the Kara Sea. Amundsen planned to freeze the Maud into the polar ice cap and drift towards the North Pole – as Nansen had done with the Fram – and he did so off Cape Chelyuskin. But, the ice became so thick that the ship was unable to break free, although it was designed for such a journey in heavy ice. In September 1919, the crew got the ship loose from the ice, but it froze again after eleven days somewhere between the New Siberian Islands and Wrangel Island.

During this time, Amundsen suffered a broken arm and was attacked by a polar bear. As a result, he participated little in the work outdoors, such as sleigh rides and hunting. He, Hanssen, and Wisting, along with two other men, embarked on an expedition by dog sled to Nome, Alaska, more than 1,000 kilometres (620 mi) away. But they found that the ice was not frozen solid in the Bering Strait, and it could not be crossed. They sent a telegram from Anadyr to signal their location.

After two winters frozen in the ice, without having achieved the goal of drifting over the North Pole, Amundsen decided to go to Nome to repair the ship and buy provisions. Several of the crew ashore there, including Hanssen, did not return on time to the ship. Amundsen considered Hanssen to be in breach of contract, and dismissed him from the crew.

During the third winter, Maud was frozen in the western Bering Strait. She finally became free and the expedition sailed south, reaching Seattle, in the American Pacific Northwest in 1921 for repairs. Amundsen returned to Norway, needing to put his finances in order. He took with him two young indigenous girls, a four-year-old he adopted, Kakonita, and her companion Camilla. When Amundsen went bankrupt two years later, however, he sent the girls to be cared for by Camilla's father, who lived in eastern Russia.

In June 1922, Amundsen returned to Maud, which had been sailed to Nome. He decided to shift from the planned naval expedition to aerial ones, and arranged to charter a plane. He divided the expedition team in two: one part, led by him, was to winter over and prepare for an attempt to fly over the pole in 1923. The second team on Maud, under the command of Wisting, was to resume the original plan to drift over the North Pole in the ice. The ship drifted in the ice for three years east of the New Siberian Islands, never reaching the North Pole. It was finally seized by Amundsen's creditors as collateral for his mounting debt.

Although they were unable to reach the North Pole, the scientific results of the expedition, mainly the work of Sverdrup, have proven to be of considerable value. Much of the carefully collected scientific data was lost during the ill-fated journey of Peter Tessem and Paul Knutsen, two crew members sent on a mission by Amundsen. The scientific materials were later retrieved in 1922 by Russian scientist Nikolay Urvantsev from where they had been abandoned on the shores of the Kara Sea.

=== Aerial expeditions to the North Pole ===
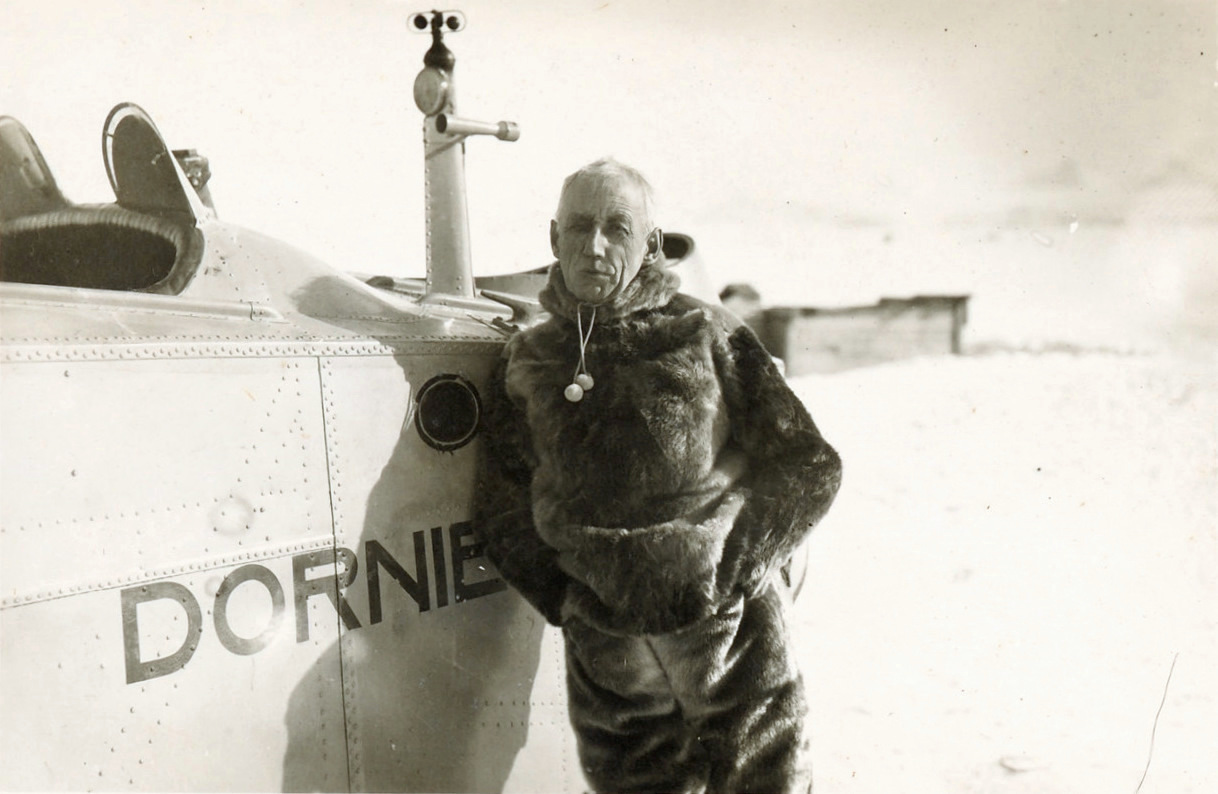
Amundsen with his plane in Svalbard (1925)

The 1923 attempt to fly over the Pole failed. Amundsen and Oskar Omdal, of the Royal Norwegian Navy, tried to fly from Wainwright, Alaska, to Spitsbergen across the North Pole. When their aircraft was damaged, they abandoned the journey. To raise additional funds, Amundsen travelled around the United States in 1924 on a lecture tour.

In 1925, accompanied by Lincoln Ellsworth, pilot Hjalmar Riiser-Larsen, flight mechanic Karl Feucht and two other team members (pilot Leif Dietrichson and mechanic Oskar Omdal), Amundsen took two Dornier Do J flying boats, the N-24 and N-25, to 87° 44′ north. It was the northernmost latitude reached by plane up to that time. The aircraft landed a few miles apart without radio contact, yet the crews managed to reunite. The N-24 was damaged. Amundsen and his crew worked for more than three weeks to clean up an airstrip to take off from ice. They shovelled 600 tons of ice while consuming only one pound (450 g) of daily food rations. In the end, the six crew members were packed into the N-25. In a remarkable feat, Riiser-Larsen took off, the flying boat barely becoming airborne over the cracking ice. They returned triumphant when everyone thought they had been lost forever.

In 1926, Amundsen and 15 other men (including Ellsworth, Riiser-Larsen, Oscar Wisting, and the Italian air crew led by aeronautical engineer Umberto Nobile) made the first crossing of the Arctic in the airship Norge, designed by Nobile. They left Spitsbergen on 11 May 1926, flew over the North Pole on 12 May, and landed in Alaska the following day.

=== Controversy over Polar Priority ===
The three previous claims to have arrived at the North Pole, by the Americans Frederick Cook in 1908; Robert Peary in 1909; and Richard E. Byrd in 1926 (just a few days before the Norge) are disputed by some, as being either of dubious accuracy or outright fraudulent. If these other claims are false, the crew of the Norge would be the first explorers verified to have reached the North Pole, when they floated over it in the Norge in 1926.

== Disappearance and death ==
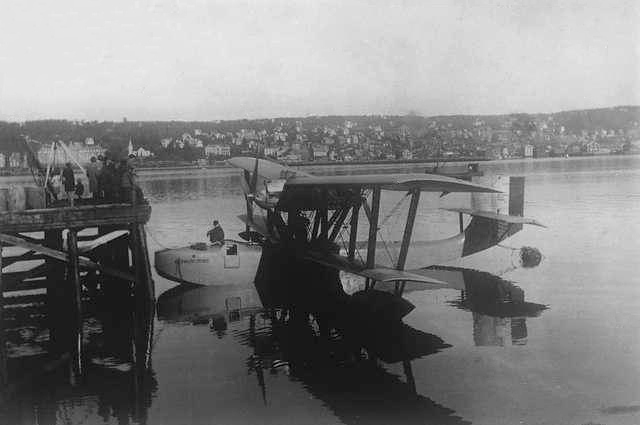
Amundsen's Latham 47 flying boat

Amundsen disappeared on 18 June 1928 while flying on a rescue mission in the Arctic. His team included Norwegian pilot Leif Dietrichson, French pilot René Guilbaud, and three more Frenchmen. They were seeking missing members of Nobile's crew, whose new airship Italia had crashed while returning from the North Pole. Amundsen's French Latham 47 flying boat never returned.

Later, a wing-float and bottom gasoline tank from the plane, which had been adapted as a replacement wing-float, were found near the Tromsø coast. It is assumed that the plane crashed in the Barents Sea, and that Amundsen and his crew were killed in the wreck, or died shortly afterward. The search for Amundsen and team was called off in September 1928 by the Norwegian government, and the bodies were never found.

In 2004 and in late August 2009, the Royal Norwegian Navy used the unmanned submarine Hugin 1000 to search for the wreckage of Amundsen's plane. The searches focused on a 40-square-mile (100 km^{2}) area of the sea floor, and were documented by the German production company ContextTV. They found nothing from the Amundsen flight.

== Personal life ==
Amundsen was a lifelong bachelor, but he had a long-time relationship with the Norwegian-born Kristine Elisabeth ('Kiss') Bennett, the wife of an Englishman, Charles Peto Bennett. He met her in London in 1907 and they remained close for many years; Amundsen kept the relationship a secret from everyone outside his intimate circle. Later, he became engaged to Bess Magids, an American divorcée whom he had met in Alaska. Though there is little evidence, it was said that Amundsen had a brief affair with his landlady in Antwerp—until he came home and found her dead after an apparent suicide. His biographer Tor Bomann-Larsen also suggests a romantic relationship between Amundsen and Sigrid Castberg, wife of the lawyer Leif Castberg from Gjøvik, in the years before the South Pole expedition, a relationship Amundsen broke off after that expedition in favour of Kiss Bennett.

Author Julian Sancton noted that in his younger years, Amundsen was said to have ignored romantic relationships in pursuit of his goals. He "found little use in activities that didn't help him fulfill his polar ambitions".

== Orders and decorations ==
- Norway:
  - Grand Cross of the Royal Norwegian Order of Saint Olav, 20 November 1906
  - Commemorative Medal for the 1910–1911 Fram Expedition to the South Pole, 20 August 1912
  - Medal for Outstanding Civic Service, 1st Class (Gold), 1925
- Austria-Hungary: Grand Cross of the Imperial Austrian Order of Franz Joseph, 1907
- Belgium: Knight of the Order of Leopold (civil division)
- Denmark:
  - Medal of Merit, in Gold and with Crown, 1907
  - Hans Egede Medal, 1925
- France:
  - Grand Officer of the National Order of the Legion of Honour
  - Grand Gold Medal of Exploration and Journeys of Discovery, 1913
- Kingdom of Italy: Grand Officer of the Order of the Crown of Italy
- Kingdom of Prussia: (Note: Returned on 24 October 1917 in protest of Germany's unrestricted submarine warfare.)
  - Knight of the Royal Order of the Crown, 1st Class
  - 1878 Alexander von Humboldt Medal, 1912
- Russian Empire: Knight of the Imperial Order of Saint Anna, 1st Class
- Sweden:
  - Commander Grand Cross of the Royal Order of the North Star, 1912
  - Vega Medal, 1913
- United Kingdom: Livingstone Medal, 1925
- United States:
  - Hubbard Medal, 1907
  - Charles P. Daly Medal, 1912
  - Congressional Gold Medal, 29 May 1928

== Legacy ==
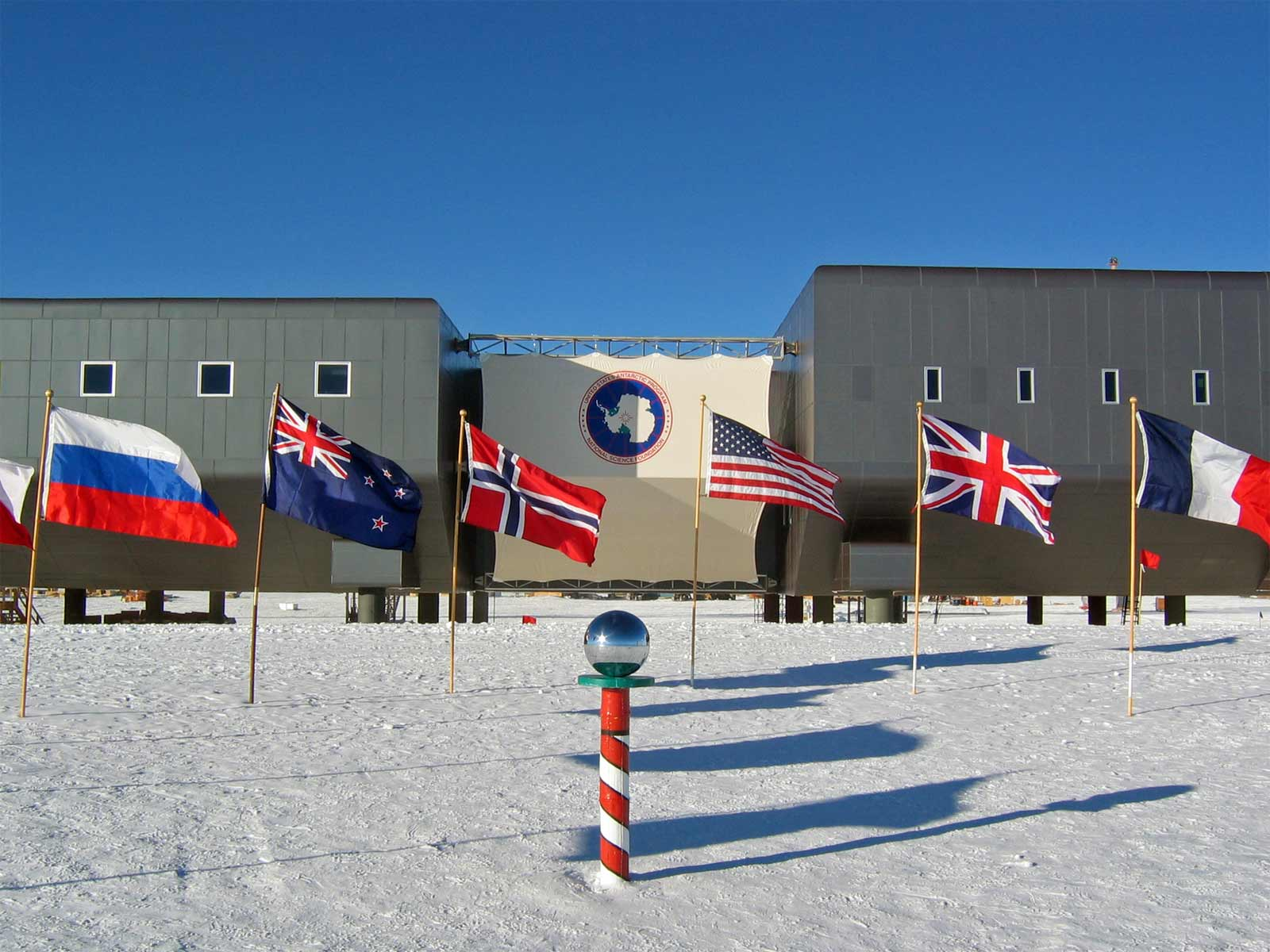
Amundsen–Scott South Pole Station

Owing to Amundsen's numerous significant accomplishments in polar exploration, many places in both the Arctic and Antarctic are named after him. The Amundsen–Scott South Pole Station, operated by the United States Antarctic Program, was jointly named in honour of Amundsen and his British rival Robert Falcon Scott. The Amundsen crater on the Moon was named after him; the rim of the crater was being considered by NASA as a potential landing location for their Artemis III lunar lander until 2024.

Built in 1929 and opened in 1930, Amundsen High School opened its doors in Chicago's Ravenswood neighborhood.

Joachim Calmeyer portrayed Amundsen in the 1968 film Bare et liv – historien om Fridtjof Nansen, which covers events from the life of Fridtjof Nansen.

The 1969 film The Red Tent tells the story of the Nobile expedition and Amundsen's disappearance. Sean Connery plays Amundsen.

A book Scott and Amundsen, by Roland Huntford, was adapted into the TV serial The Last Place on Earth. It aired in 1985 and features Sverre Anker Ousdal as Amundsen.

On 15 February 2019, a biographic Norwegian film titled Amundsen, directed by Espen Sandberg, was released.

== European-Inuit descendant claims ==
At least two Inuit in Gjøa Haven with European ancestry have claimed to be descendants of Amundsen, from the period of their extended winter stay on King William Island from 1903 to 1905. Accounts by members of the expedition told of their relations with Inuit women, and historians have speculated that Amundsen might also have taken a partner, although he wrote a warning against this.

Specifically, half-brothers Bob Konona and Paul Ikuallaq say that their father Luke Ikuallaq told them on his deathbed that he was the son of Amundsen. Konona said that their father Ikuallaq was left out on the ice to die after his birth, as his European ancestry made him illegitimate to the Inuit, threatening their community. His Inuit grandparents saved him.

In 2012, Y-DNA analysis, with the families' permission, showed that Ikuallaq was not a match to the direct male line of Amundsen. Not all descendants claiming European ancestry have been tested for a match to Amundsen, nor has there been a comparison of Ikuallaq's DNA to that of other European members of Amundsen's crew.

== Works by Amundsen ==
- The North-West Passage; Being the Record of a Voyage of Exploration of the Ship "Gjöa". Vol. 1. New York: E.P. Dutton and Co. 1908. OCLC 971379351.
- The North-West Passage; Being the Record of a Voyage of Exploration of the Ship "Gjöa". Vol. 2. New York: E.P. Dutton and Co. 1908.
- The South Pole: An Account of the Norwegian Antarctic Expedition in the Fram, 1910–12. 1912. OCLC 727260901.
- Nordost Passagen: Maudfaerden Langs Asiens Kyst 1918–1920. Kristiania: Gyldendal. 1921. OCLC 576654047.
- Our Polar Flight: The Amundsen–Ellsworth Polar Flight. New York: Dodd, Mead. 1926. OCLC 918183295.
- The First Flight Across the Polar Sea. London: Hutchinson. 1927. OCLC 1026703671.
- My Life as an Explorer. New York: Doubleday. 1927. OCLC 3657624.

== See also ==
- Comparison of the Amundsen and Scott expeditions
- List of people who disappeared mysteriously at sea
