= Marshall Archipelago =

Group of islands in Marie Byrd Land, Antarctica

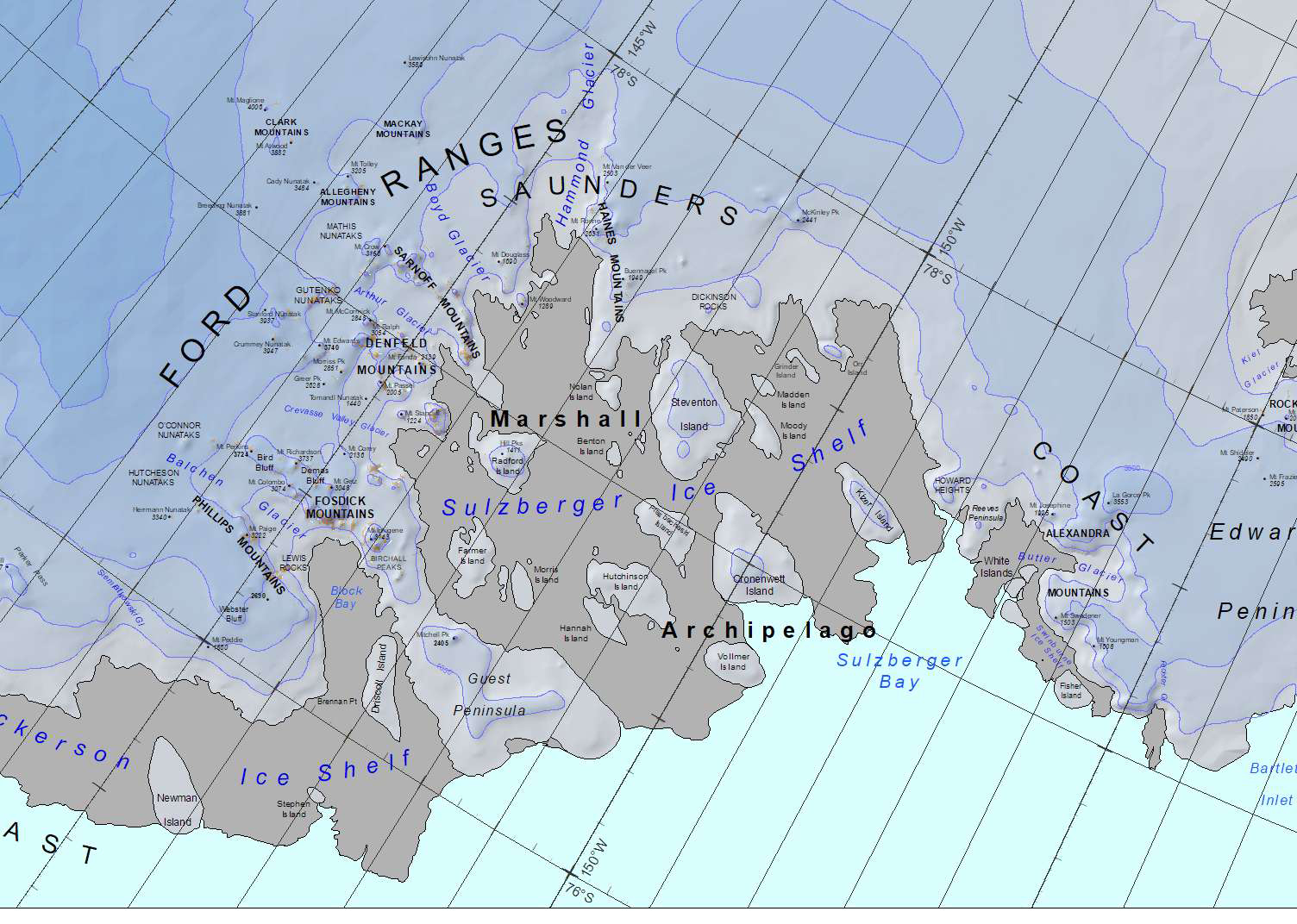
- Map of the Marshall Archipelago

- Location within Antarctica

Geography
- Location: Marie Byrd Land, Antarctica
- Coordinates: 77°0′S 148°30′W
- Total islands: 10

Administration
- Administered under the Antarctic Treaty System

Demographics
- Population: Uninhabited

The Marshall Archipelago (77°0′S 148°30′W) is an extensive group of large ice-covered islands within the Sulzberger Ice Shelf, Antarctica.

== Discovery and name ==
Several of the islands in the Marshall Archipelago were discovered and plotted by the Byrd Antarctic Expeditions (ByrdAE; 1928–30 and 1933–35) and by the United States Antarctic Service (USAS; 1939–41), all led by Admiral Richard E. Byrd. The full extent of the archipelago was mapped by the United States Geological Survey (USGS) from surveys and United States Navy air photographs between 1959 and 1965. The name was proposed by Admiral Byrd for General of the Army George C. Marshall, who made financial contributions as a private individual and also, on the same basis, provided advisory assistance to the Byrd expedition of 1933–35.

== Location ==
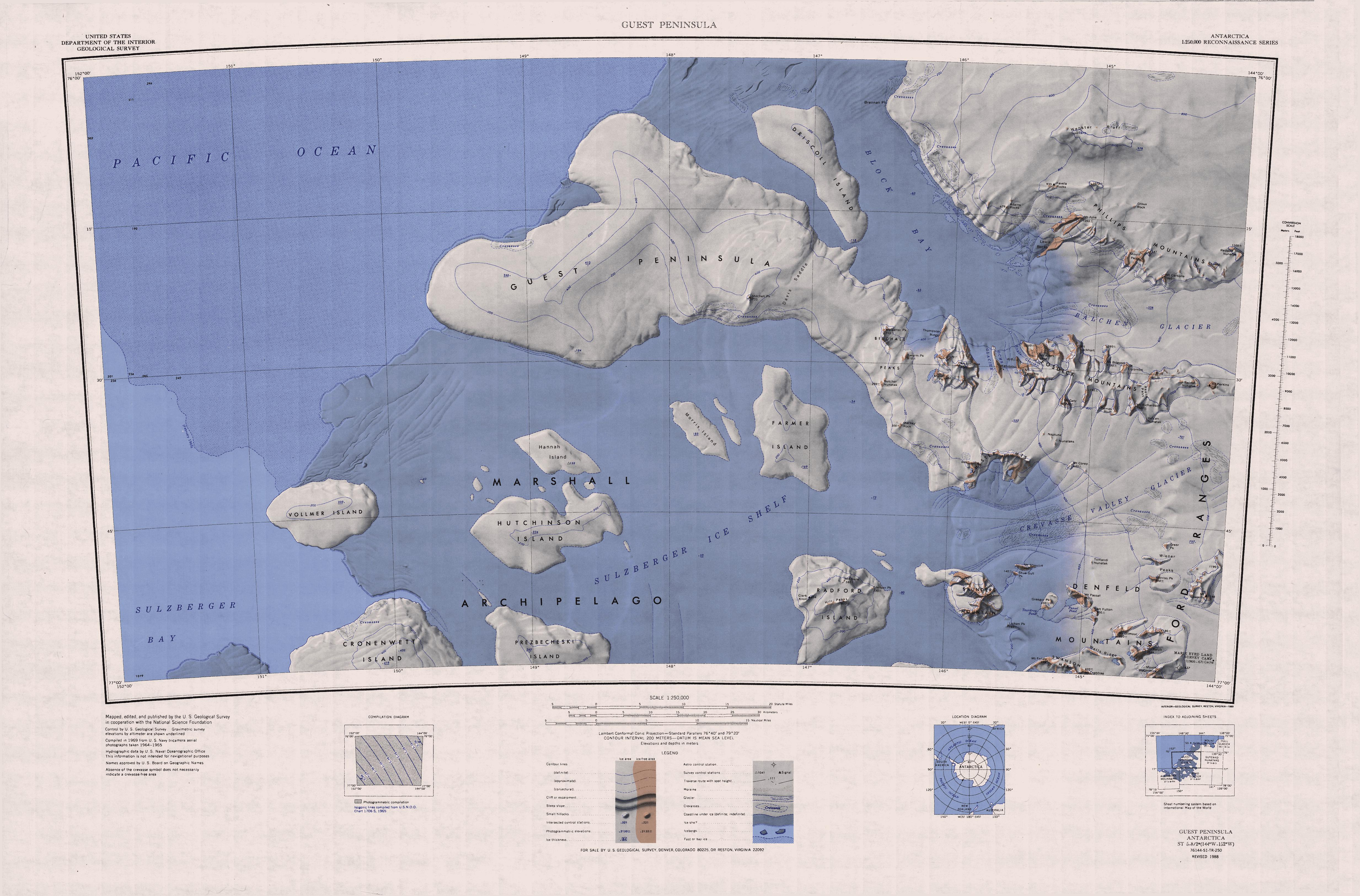
Northern part of ice shelf

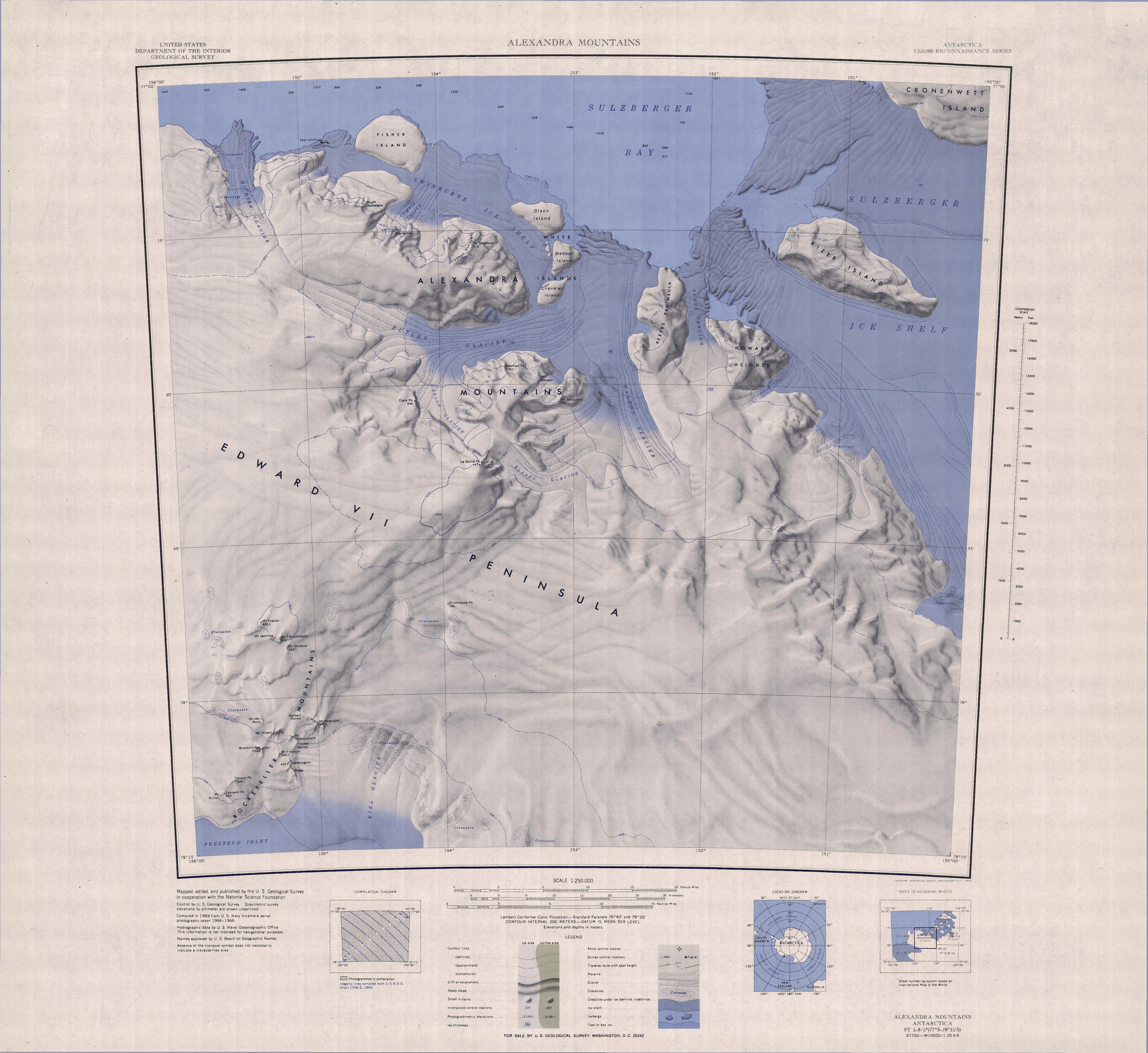
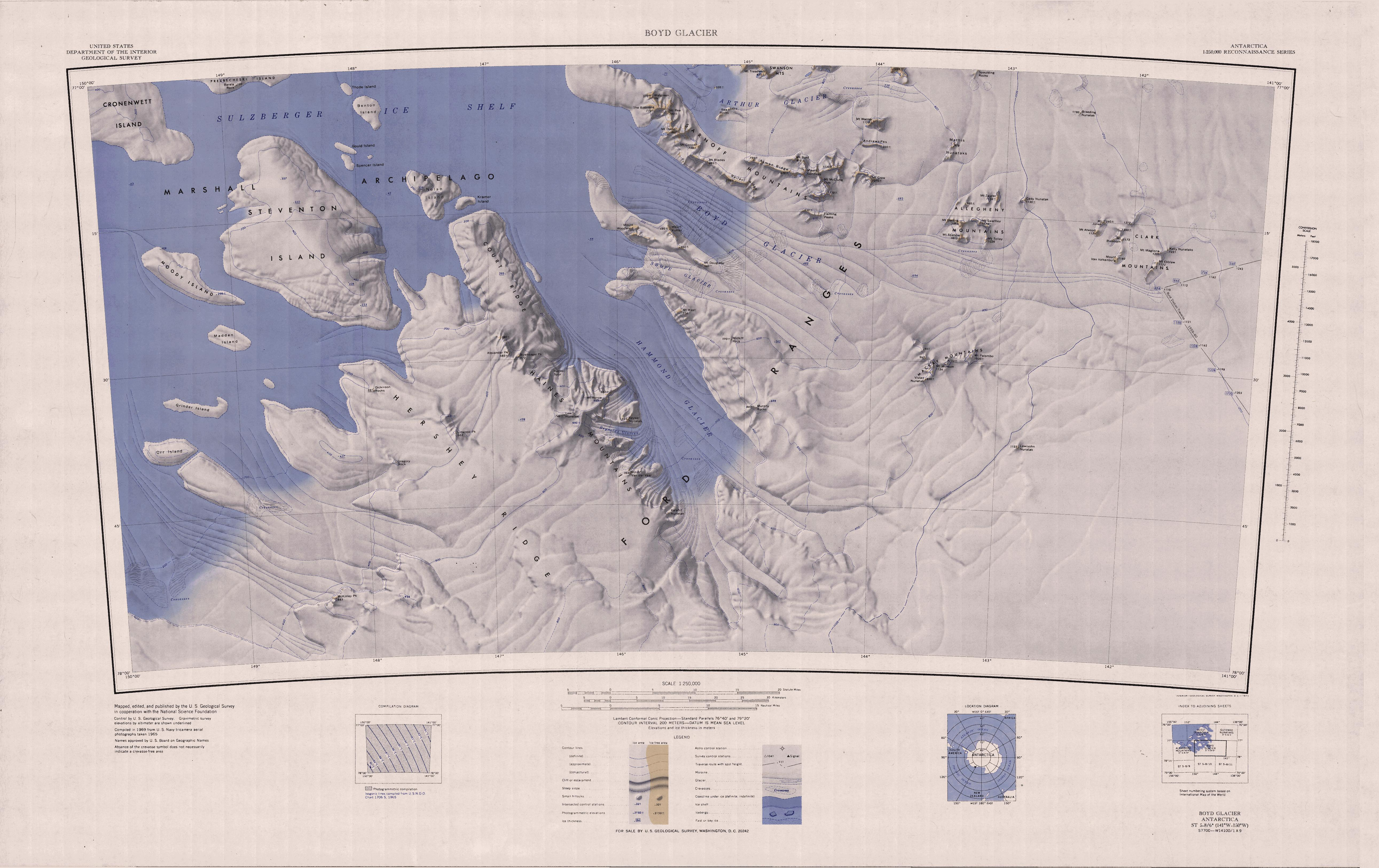
Southern part of ice shelf

The islands of the Marshall Archipelago are scattered throughout the Sulzberger Ice Shelf. The landward side of the ice shelf extends southeast from Howard Heights to McKinley Peak, then runs northeast to the Denfeld Mountains and then runs northwest along the southern edge of the Guest Peninsula. The seaward side extends in a generally northeast direction from the tip of the Reeves Peninsula to the tip of the Guest Peninsula. The seaward side forms the shore of Sulzberger Bay.

Islands in the southwest include Kizer Island, Cronenwett Island, Orr Island, Grinder Island, Madden Island, Moody Island, Przybyszewski (Note: The name of Przybyszewski Island has been misspelled "Prezbecheski Island" on some maps and charts.) Island and Steventon Island. Islands in the southeast include Thode Island, Benton Island, Gould Island, Spencer Island, Nolan Island and Kramer Island. Islands further the north include Vollmer Island, Hutchinson Island, Hannah Island, Morris Island, Farmer Island and Radford Island.

== Southwest islands ==
Islands in the southwest of the archipelago include, from west to east,

=== Kizer Island ===
77°16′S 150°48′W. An ice-covered island about 15 nautical miles (28 km; 17 mi) long, lying 10 nautical miles (19 km; 12 mi) southwest of Cronenwett Island at the west end of Sulzberger Ice Shelf. Named for Lieutenant T.L. Kizer, United States Navy, helicopter pilot on the USS Glacier who sighted the island from the air on January 26, 1962.

=== Cronenwett Island ===
77°00′S 150°00′W. A high, ice-covered island about 20 nautical miles (37 km; 23 mi) long. It lies between Vollmer Island and Steventon Island. The feature was first observed and roughly delineated from aerial photographs taken by the ByrdAE, 1928-30. Named by US-ACAN for Commander W.R. Cronenwett, United States Navy, Photographic Officer for Operation Deep Freeze II, 1956-57, and Public Information Officer for Task Group 43.1 during Deep Freeze 1962.

=== Orr Island ===
77°38′S 149°36′W. An ice-covered island 5 nautical miles (9.3 km; 5.8 mi) long, lying 3 nautical miles (5.6 km; 3.5 mi) southwest of Grinder Island. Named by US-ACAN for Lieutenant Commander Thomas E. Orr, Supply Officer and Officer-in-Charge of the Para Rescue Team of United States Navy Squadron VX-6 during Operation Deep Freeze 1968.

=== Grinder Island ===
77°34′S 149°20′W. One of the ice-covered islands in Marshall Archipelago. The island is 7 nautical miles (13 km; 8.1 mi) long and 1 nautical mile (1.9 km; 1.2 mi) wide and lies 13 nautical miles (24 km; 15 mi) southwest of Steventon Island. Mapped by USGS from surveys and United States Navy air photos, 1959-65. Named by US-ACAN for Harry W. Grinder, aviation structural mechanic, United States Navy, of McMurdo Station, 1967.

=== Madden Island ===
77°27′S 149°03′W. An ice-covered island, 4 nautical miles (7.4 km; 4.6 mi) long. It lies between Moody Island and Grinder Island. Named by US-ACAN for Michael C. Madden, electrician's mate, United States Navy, of the Byrd Station party, 1966.

=== Moody Island ===
77°20′S 149°12′W. An ice-covered island 10 nautical miles (19 km; 12 mi) long, between Kizer and Steventon Islands. Named by US-ACAN for E.L. Moody, dog-driver with the ByrdAE (1933-35).

=== Przybyszewski Island ===
76°58′S 148°45′W. An ice-covered island 12 nautical miles (22 km; 14 mi) long. It lies 3 nautical miles (5.6 km; 3.5 mi) east of Cronenwett Island in the western part of Sulzberger Ice Shelf. The island was charted from aircraft of the USS Glacier under Captain Edwin A. McDonald, United States Navy, in 1962. Named by him for Lieutenant (j-g-) V.A. Przybyszewski, United States Navy Reserve, helicopter pilot on the Glacier who sighted the island from the air on January 26, 1962.

=== Barela Rock ===
77°01′S 148°52′W. A rock outcrop in the south part of Przybyszewski Island. Named by US-ACAN for Ruben E. Barela, aviation structural mechanic, United States Navy, of the McMurdo Station party, 1967.

=== Steventon Island ===
77°15′S 148°15′W. A broad ice-covered island about 24 nautical miles (44 km; 28 mi) long, lying west of Court Ridge. Named by US-ACAN for Richard F. Steventon, United States Navy, Petty Officer in charge of Eights Station, 1963.

== Southeast islands ==
Islands in the southeast of the archipelago include, from west to east,

=== Thode Island ===
77°02′S 148°03′W. A small ice-covered island in Sulzherger Ice Shelf, located 1 nautical mile (1.9 km; 1.2 mi) northwest of Benton Island and 5 nautical miles (9.3 km; 5.8 mi) east of Przybyszewski Island. Named by US-ACAN for George C. Thode, meteorologist at Byrd Station in 1968.

=== Benton Island ===
77°04′S 147°53′W. An ice-covered island about 4 nautical miles (7.4 km; 4.6 mi) long, lying 5 nautical miles (9.3 km; 5.8 mi) northwest of Nolan Island in Marshall Archipelago. Named by US-ACAN for William T. Benton, BM1, United States Navy, Boatswain's Mate aboard USS Glacier along this coast, 1961-62.

=== Gould Island ===
77°08′S 148°05′W. One of the ice-covered islands in Marshall Archipelago, located within Sulzberger Ice Shelf, coastal Marie Byrd Land. The feature is 2 nautical miles (3.7 km; 2.3 mi) long and lies just north of Spencer Island and 2 nautical miles (3.7 km; 2.3 mi) northeast of Steventon Island. Named by US-ACAN for Lieutenant Stuart S. Gould, United States Navy Reserve, dental officer at McMurdo Station, 1967.

=== Spencer Island ===
77°09′S 148°04′W. A small ice-covered island, lying 2 nautical miles (3.7 km; 2.3 mi) off the northeast part of Steventon Island. Named by US-ACAN for Lieutenant Michael P. Spencer, United States Navy Reserve, navigator in LC-130F Hercules aircraft during Operation Deep Freeze 1968.

=== Nolan Island ===
77°13′S 147°24′W. An ice-covered island 6 nautical miles (11 km; 6.9 mi) long, lying 2 nautical miles (3.7 km; 2.3 mi) north of Court Ridge. Discovered and mapped by the USAS, 1939-41. Named by US-ACAN for William G. Nolan, RD1, United States Navy, Radarman aboard USS Glacier in Antarctica, 1957-58 and 1961-62.

=== Kramer Island ===
77°14′S 147°10′W. An ice-covered island, 2 nautical miles (3.7 km; 2.3 mi) long. It lies between Nolan Island and Court Ridge. Named by US-ACAN for Michael S. Kramer, meteorologist at Byrd Station, 1968.

== Northern islands ==
Islands in the north of the archipelago include, from west to east,

=== Vollmer Island ===
76°44′S 150°30′W. An ice-covered island 11 nautical miles (20 km; 13 mi) long, lying along the edge of Sulzberger Ice Shelf, 7 nautical miles (13 km; 8.1 mi) northwest of Cronenwett Island. It appears that this feature was first observed and roughly mapped from aerial photographs taken by the ByrdAE, 1928-30. Named by US-ACAN for Lieutenant T.H. Vollmer, United States Navy, engineering officer aboard USS Glacier along this coast, 1961-62.

=== Hutchinson Island ===
76°47′S 148°53′W. An ice-covered island 15 nautical miles (28 km; 17 mi) long, lying 10 nautical miles (19 km; 12 mi) east of Vollmer Island. Named by US-ACAN for Lieutenant (j.g.) Peter A. Hutchinson, United States Navy, Operations Officer aboard USS Glacier along this coast, 1961-62.

=== Hannah Island ===
76°39′S 148°48′W. An ice-covered island lying between Hutchinson Island and Guest Peninsula. Named by US-ACAN for J.P. Hannah, USARP ionospheric physicist at Byrd Station in 1968.

=== Morris Island ===
76°37′S 147°48′W. An ice-covered island about 7 nautical miles (13 km; 8.1 mi) long, lying 5 nautical miles (9.3 km; 5.8 mi) west of Farmer Island. Named by US-ACAN for Lieutenant (j.g.) J.E. Morris, United States Navy Reserve, aboard USS Glacier along this coast in 1961-62.

=== Farmer Island ===
76°38′S 147°04′W. An ice-covered island 14 nautical miles (26 km; 16 mi) long, lying 6 nautical miles (11 km; 6.9 mi) north of Radford Island. Named by US-ACAN for Floyd L. Farmer, SFCA, United States Navy, senior shipfitter on the USS Glacier along this coast, 1961-62.

== Sources ==
- Alberts, Fred G., ed. (1995), Geographic Names of the Antarctic (PDF) (2 ed.), United States Board on Geographic Names This article incorporates public domain material from websites or documents of the United States Board on Geographic Names.
- Alexandra Mountains, USGS: United States Geological Survey
- Boyd Glacier, USGS: United States Geological Survey
- Guest Peninsula, USGS: United States Geological Survey
- This article incorporates public domain material from websites or documents of the United States Geological Survey.
