= Rockefeller Mountains =

Antarctic mountain range

- Location within Antarctica

Geography
- Range coordinates: 78°0′S 155°0′W

The Rockefeller Mountains (78°0′S 155°0′W) are a group of low-lying, scattered granite peaks and ridges, almost entirely snow-covered, standing 30 nautical miles (56 km; 35 mi) south-southwest of the Alexandra Mountains on the Edward VII Peninsula of Antarctica.

== Location ==
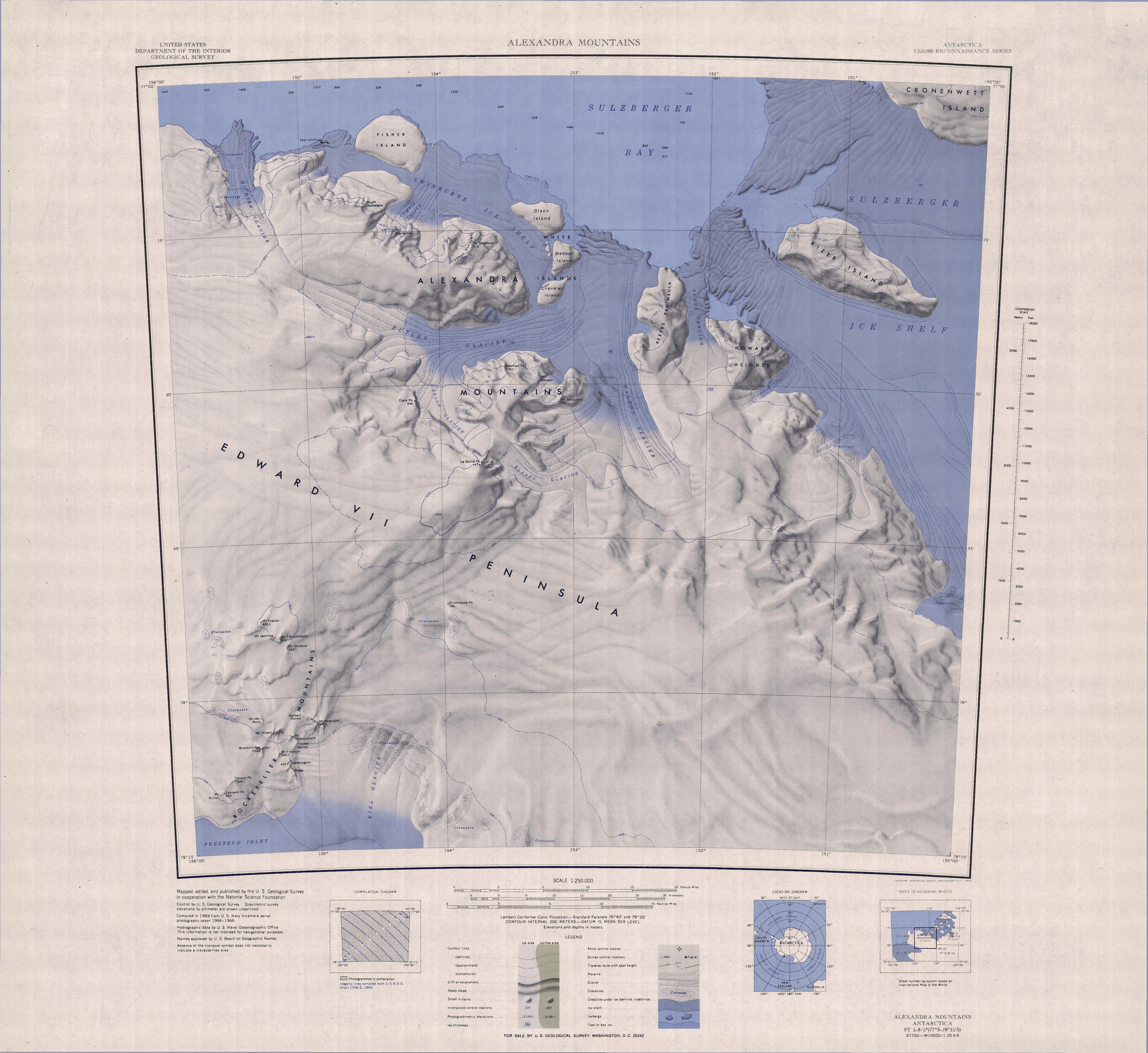
Context: Rockefeller Mountains in southwest of map

The Rockefeller Mountains are on the south side of the Edward VII Peninsula in Marie Byrd Land, to the south of the Alexandra Mountains. They are north of the Prestrud Inlet and west of the Kiel Glacier. They run from southwest to northeast. Western features, from south to north, include Mount Butler, Tennant Peak, Gould Peak, Breckinridge Peak, Mount Nilsen and Strider Rock- Central features, from south to north, include Washington Ridge, Mount Franklin, Fokker Rocks, Mount Schlossbach, Mount Paterson and Melbert Rocks. Northern features, from south to north, include Mount Shideler, Mount Fitzsimmons, Mount Jackling and Mount Frazier. Drummond Peak is an isolated nunatak to the northeast.

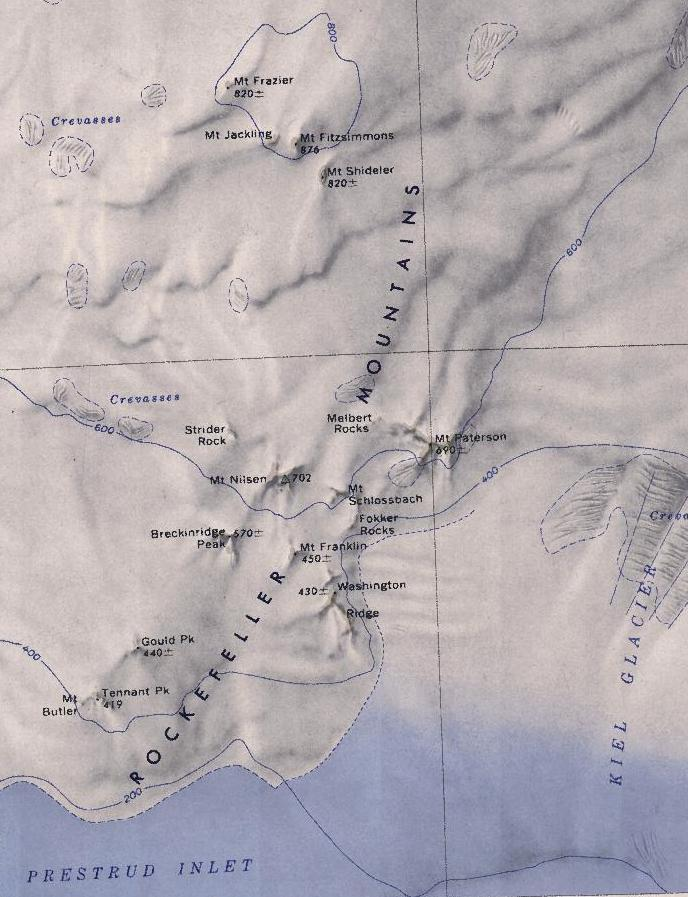
Rockefeller Mountains detail from context map

== Appearance ==
The exposed part of the Rockefeller Mountains covers about 20 square miles (52 km^{2}). It has black and pink peaks that rise to 1,500 to 2,000 feet (460 to 610 m) above sea level, but that only protrude from the ice by a few hundred feet. The northern group are higher, but more deeply buried in the ice. Mount Margaret Wade (now called Mount Fitzsimmons) is the second highest in the Edward VII Peninsula after Mount LaGorce (now called La Gorce Peak). Most of the peaks are pink or red, made up of acidic intrusives. A small central group is dark grey or black and composed of metamorphosed sediments.

== Discovery and name ==
The Rockefeller Mountains were discovered by the Byrd Antarctic Expedition (ByrdAE) on January 27, 1929. They were named by Byrd for John D. Rockefeller Jr., a patron of the expedition.

The geologist Laurence M. Gould and his team flew out to this mountain range in their plane; but after landing, a snow storm blew it half a mile away onto the ice, destroying it. This left them stranded for 11 days with limited food until the Byrd team in the Little America settlement could be reached and could send another plane to pick them up. These events are captured in the documentary With Byrd at the South Pole. The mountains were mapped for the first time from aerial photographs taken later in 1929. Several parties of the second Burd Antarctic Expedition 1933-35 explored the mountains, including separate visits to Mount Helen Washington and Mount Nilsen. A more thorough exploration was made by the United States Antarctic Service Expedition of 1939-1941.

== Southwestern features ==
=== Mount Butler ===
78°10′S 155°17′W. The southernmost peak of the Rockefeller Mountains. Discovered on January 27, 1929, by members of the ByrdAE on an exploratory flight over this area. Named for Raymond Butler, member of the USAS party which occupied the Rockefeller Mountains seismic station during November and December 1940.

=== Tennant Peak ===
78°09′S 155°18′W. A peak 1 nautical mile (1.9 km; 1.2 mi) south of Gould Peak in the south group of the Rockefeller Mountains. Discovered by the ByrdAE (1928-30) and named by Byrd for George W. Tennant, cook on the expedition.

=== Gould Peak ===
78°07′S 155°15′W. A peak standing 1 nautical mile (1.9 km; 1.2 mi) north of Tennant Peak in the south group of the Rockefeller Mountains. Discovered by the ByrdAE in 1929, and named by Byrd for Charles ("Chips") Gould, carpenter on the expedition.

=== Breckinridge Peak ===
78°04′S 155°07′W. A peak in the south group of the Rockefeller Mountains, standing 1 nautical mile (1.9 km; 1.2 mi) southwest of Mount Nilsen. Discovered by the ByrdAE in 1929, and named by Byrd for Colonel and Mrs. Henry Breckinridge of New York.

=== Mount Nilsen ===
78°03′S 155°00′W. A peak 4 nautical miles (7.4 km; 4.6 mi) west-southwest of Mount Paterson. Discovered in 1929 by the ByrdAE, and named by Byrd for Captain Nilsen of the Norwegian whaler C.A. Larsen, which towed the City of New York through the pack ice.

=== Strider Rock ===
78°02′S 155°26′W. A rock 1 nautical mile (1.9 km; 1.2 mi) northwest of Mount Nilsen. Discovered by the ByrdAE in 1929. Named by US-ACAN for John P. Strider, Aviation Machinist's Mate, United States Navy, plane captain on the ski-equipped R4D carrying Rear Admiral George J. Dufek that was the first aircraft to land at the geographic South Pole, on October 31, 1956.

== Southeastern features ==
=== Washington Ridge ===
78°06′S 154°48′W. A rock ridge surmounted by three peaks, standing 1.5 nautical miles (2.8 km; 1.7 mi) southeast of Mount Franklin. Discovered on a ByrdAE flight of January 27, 1929. Named by Rear Admiral Richard E. Byrd for his niece, Helen A. Washington.

=== Mount Franklin ===
78°05′S 154°57′W. Peak standing between Breckinridge Peak and Washington Ridge. Discovered by the ByrdAE on January 27, 1929. The name was applied by the USAS (1939–41), which established a seismic station camp on this peak.

=== Fokker Rocks ===
78°04′S 155°10′W. (Note: The coordinates 78°04′S 155°10′W given for the Fokker Rocks in Alberts 1995 place them to the west of Breckinridge Peak (78°04′S 155°07′W), well to the west of Mount Schlossbach (78°03′S 154°48′W). This is not consistent with the description "just south of Mount Schlossbach", or with the USGS map of the region.) Rock outcrops just south of Mount Schlossbach. The name, applied by US-ACAN, recalls the fact that a Fokker airplane of the ByrdAE, 1928-30, was damaged beyond repair by strong winds while it was on the ground on the south side of nearby Washington Ridge. The plane was visited by Charles Morrison of USGS on December 31, 1966.

=== Mount Schlossbach ===
78°03′S 154°48′W. A peak just southeast of Mount Nilsen. Discovered by the ByrdAE on a flight of January 27, 1929, and named for Commander Isaac Schlossbach, United States Navy, a member of the ByrdAE (1933-35) and member of the USAS party which occupied the Rockefeller Mountains seismic station during November-December 1940.

=== Mount Paterson ===
78°02′S 154°36′W. A pyramidal mountain about 2 nautical miles (3.7 km; 2.3 mi) northeast of Mount Schlossbach. Discovered by the ByrdAE (1928-30) and later named by Byrd for Seward M. Paterson, manufacturer who furnished shoes and ski boots for the ByrdAE (1933-35).

=== Melbert Rocks ===
78°02′S 155°07′W. Rock outcrops close northwest of Mount Paterson. Discovered by the ByrdAE, 1928-30. Named by US-ACAN for George W. Melbert, UTCN, United States Navy, Utilitiesman at Byrd Station, 1966.

== Northern features ==
=== Mount Shideler ===
77°55′S 154°51′W. A peak 1 nautical mile (1.9 km; 1.2 mi) southeast of Mount Fitzsimmons. Discovered on January 27, 1929, by members of the ByrdAE on an exploratory flight over this area. The name appears to have been applied by the US AS (1939–41).

=== Mount Fitzsimmons ===
77°54′S 154°55′W. A peak standing between Mounts Jackling and Shideler. Discovered on January 27, 1929, by members of the ByrdAE on an exploratory flight to this area. Named for Roy G. Fitzsimmons, physicist in charge of the Rockefeller Mountains seismic station for the US AS during November-December 1940.

=== Mount Jackling ===
77°54′S 154°58′W. A peak 1 nautical mile (1.9 km; 1.2 mi) south of Mount Frazier. Discovered on January 27, 1929, by members of the ByrdAE on an exploratory flight over this area. The name was applied by the USAS (1939-41) which explored the area.

=== Mount Frazier ===
77°52′S 154°58′W. Northernmost peak of the Rockefeller Mountains, standing 1 nautical mile (1.9 km; 1.2 mi) north of Mount Jackling. Discovered on January 27, 1929, by the ByrdAE. Named for Russell G. Frazier, medical officer at West Base of the USAS (1939–41), and observer with the Rockefeller Mountains Geological Party, which visited this area in December 1940.

== Nearby features ==
=== Prestrud Inlet ===
78°18′S 156°00′W. A re-entrant in the south side of Edward VII Peninsula, at the northeast corner of the Ross Ice Shelf. Named by the United States Antarctic Service expedition (1939-41) in honor of Lieutenant K. Prestrud, leader of Amundsen's Eastern Sledge Party in 1911 who was first to traverse this region.

=== Kiel Glacier ===
78°08′S 154°15′W. A broad, heavily crevassed glacier descending southwest from Edward VII Peninsula just east of the Rockefeller Mountains. The glacier was partially delineated from aerial photographs obtained by the ByrdAE (1928-30) and subsequently was observed from the air by several United States expeditions to the area. It is named for driver Max R. Kiel born 9/20/1933 in Enterprises Oregon, United States Navy, Mobile Construction Battalion, who lost his life on March 5, 1956, when his tractor fell into a crevasse about 20 nautical miles (37 km; 23 mi) westward of this glacier while attempting to establish a trail to Byrd Station.

=== Drummond Peak ===
77°51′S 153°58′W. A low, isolated rock peak 19 nautical miles (35 km; 22 mi) southwest of La Gorce Peak, rising above the ice surface of Edward VII Peninsula. Mapped by USGS from surveys and United States Navy air photos, 1955-59. Named by US-ACAN for Lieutenant (j.g.) Glenn N. Drummond, Jr., United States Navy, Assistant Aerologist on the staff, United States Naval Support Force, Antarctica, 1959-62.

== Sources ==
- Alberts, Fred G., ed. (1995), Geographic Names of the Antarctic (PDF) (2 ed.), United States Board on Geographic Names This article incorporates public domain material from websites or documents of the United States Board on Geographic Names.
- Alexandra Mountains, USGS: United States Geological Survey
- Wade, F. Alton (30 April 1945), "The Geology of the Rockefeller Mountains, King Edward VII Land, Antarctica", Proceedings of the American Philosophical Society, 89 (1, Reports on Scientific Results of the United States Antarctic Service Expedition, 1939–1941): 67–77, JSTOR 985315
- "With Byrd at the South Pole", IMDb
- This article incorporates public domain material from websites or documents of the United States Geological Survey.
