= Karl Feucht =

German flight mechanic and polar explorer

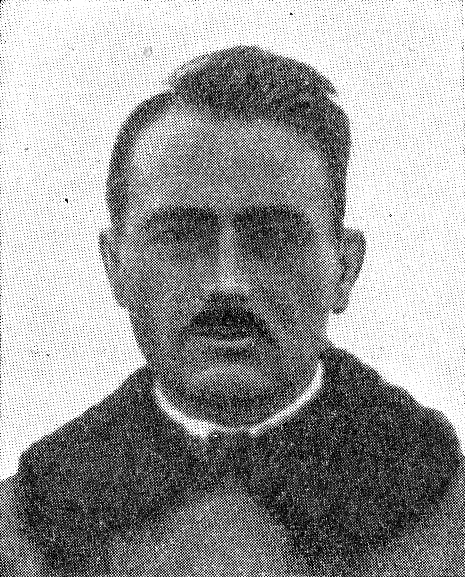
Karl Feucht (1925)

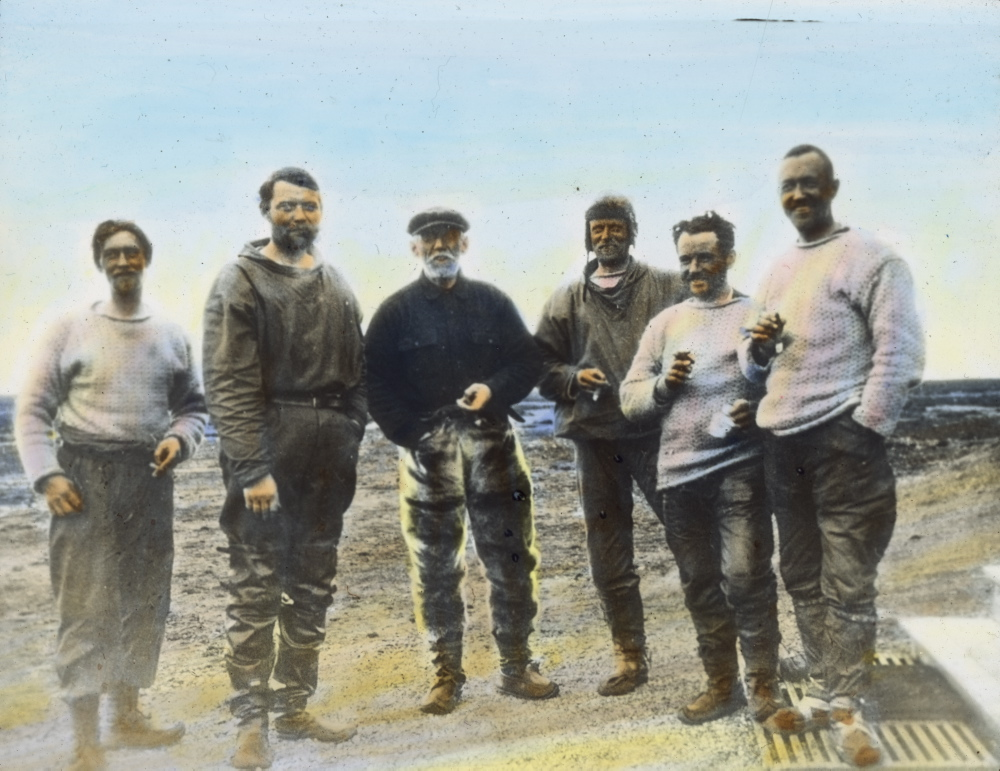
The polar flight - left to right, Omdal, Riiser-Larsen, Amundsen, Dietrichson, Feucht and Ellsworth

Karl Feucht (24 December 1893 - 30 June 1954) was a German flight mechanic and polar explorer. In 1925, he was one of two mechanics aboard the two Dornier Wal flying boats in which Roald Amundsen, Lincoln Ellsworth and Hjalmar Riiser-Larsen made a failed attempt to reached the geographic North Pole by air, starting from the island of Spitzbergen.

== Life ==
Born in Heimerdingen, now part of Ditzingen, his parents were the builder Christian Feucht (1856–1929) and his wife Wilhelmine (1863–1954). He died in Friedrichshafen, while his wife, Maria, died in 1945. The couple had three children: Richard, Wilhelm, and Gertrud.

== Bibliography ==
- (in German) Herbert Hoffmann: Karl Feucht – Pionier der Luftfahrt und Polarflieger aus Heimerdingen. In: Dijou. Nr. 9, 6/2012, S. 10 (PDF; 5,31 MB).
