= Sulzberger Bay =

Bay in Antarctica

- Images captured by Envisat's Advanced Synthetic Aperture Radar on 12 March and 16 March 2011. The newly formed icebergs can clearly be seen in the second image. (European Space Agency)

- Location within Antarctica
- Location: Antarctica
- Coordinates: 77°0′S 152°0′W
- Ocean/sea sources: Pacific Ocean

Sulzberger Bay (77°0′S 152°0′W) is a bay indenting the front of the Sulzberger Ice Shelf between Fisher Island and Vollmer Island, along the coast of Marie Byrd Land, Antarctica.

== Location ==
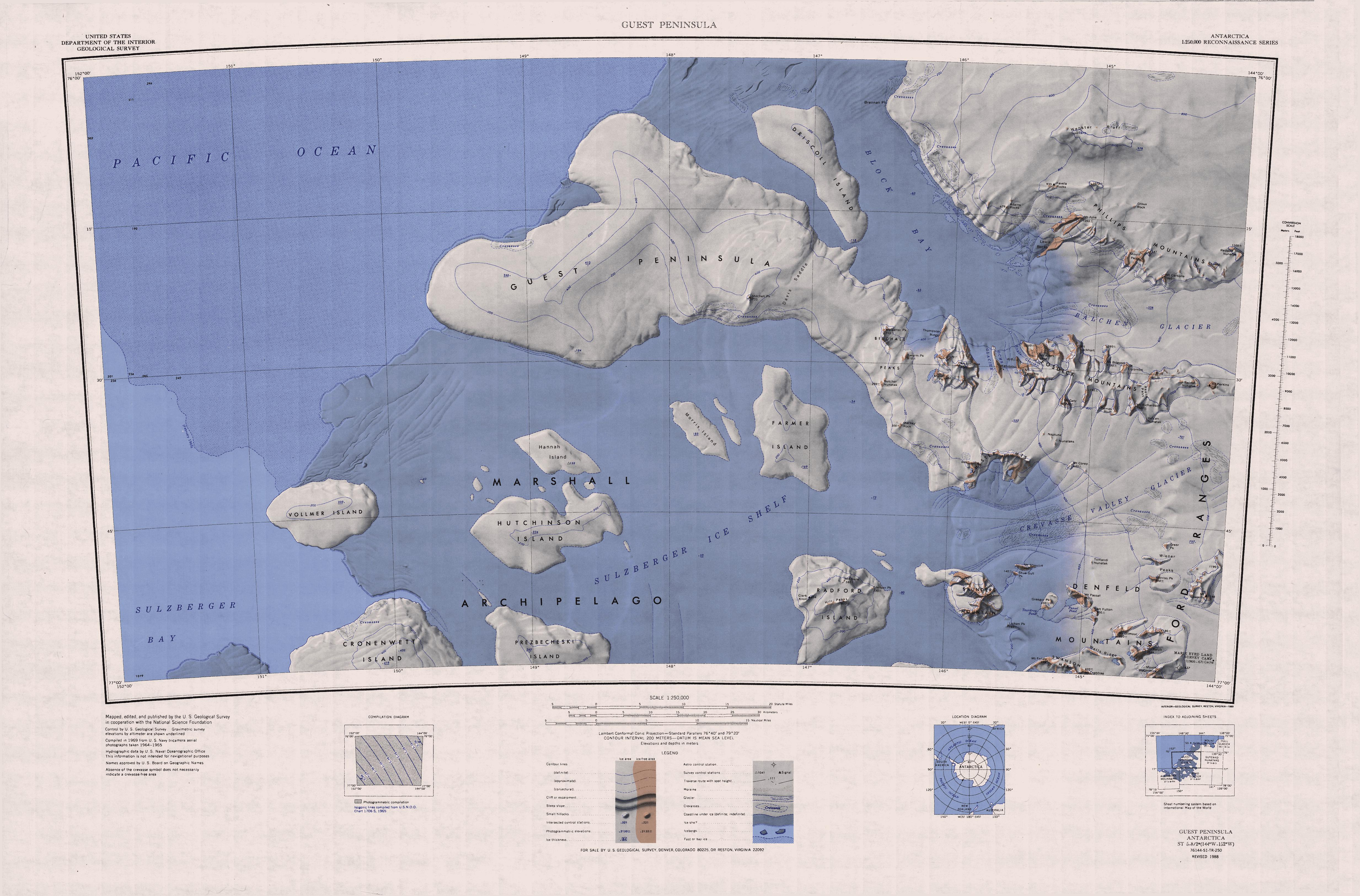
Northeastern part of bay

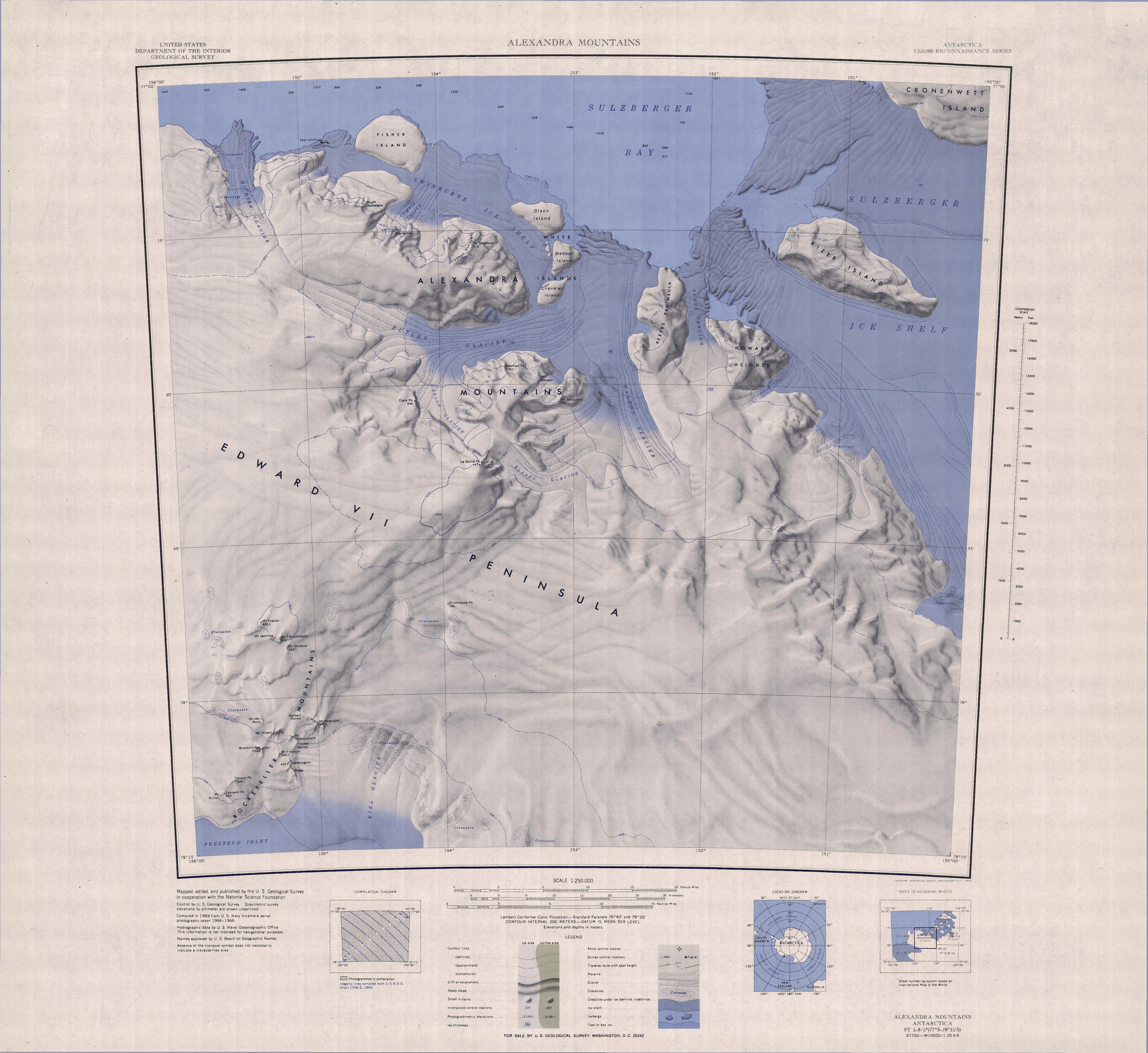
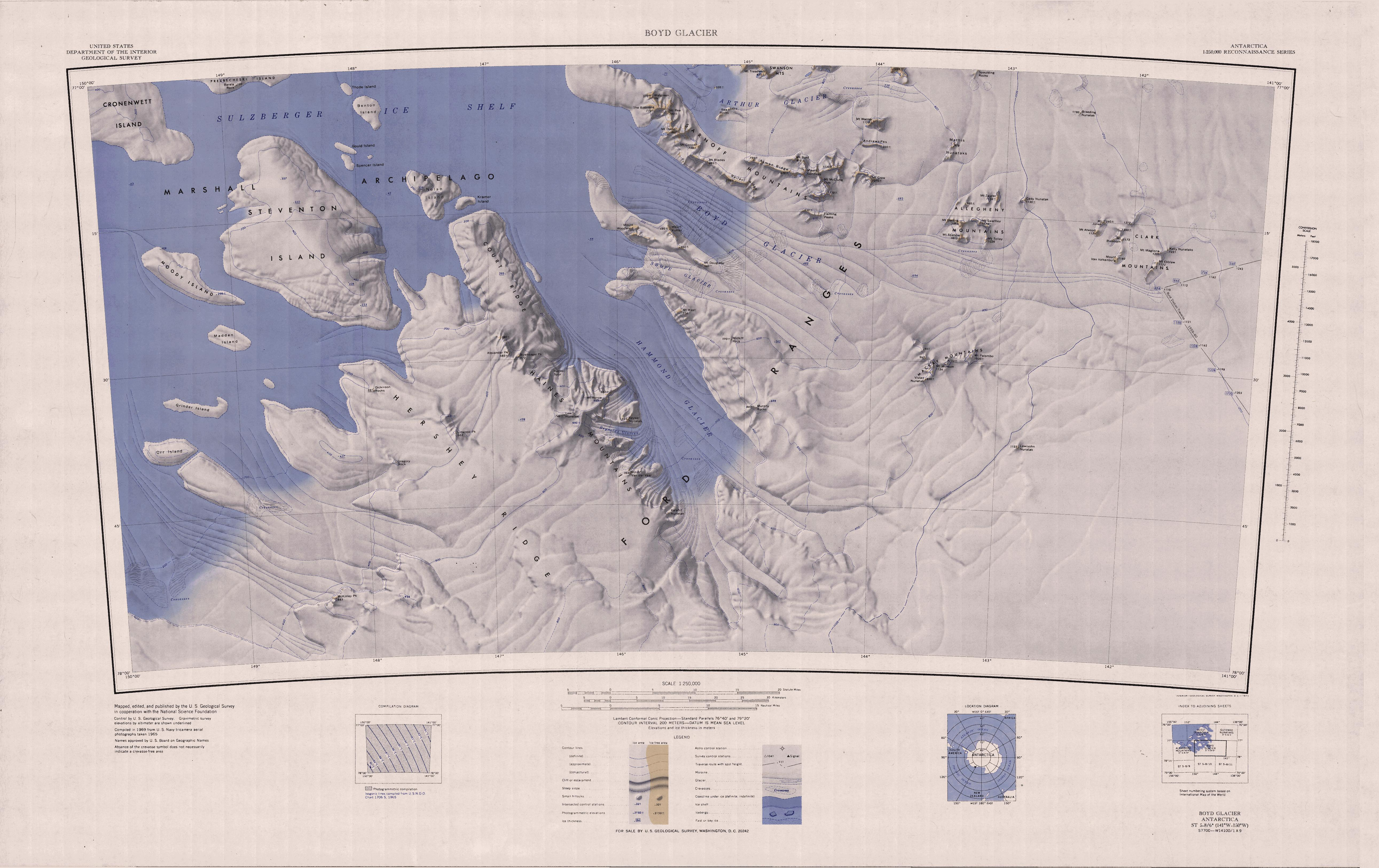
Southern part of bay

Sulzberger Bay is on the Southern Ocean coast of Marie Byrd Land. It extends along the coast of the Edward VII Peninsula from Fisher Island to Vollmer Island. The Richter Glacier enters the ocean just west of the bay. The Swinburne Ice Shelf, which is fed by the Cumbie Glacier, extends along the coast between Fisher Island and Olson Island, the northern of the White Islands at the mouth of the Butler Glacier, which enters the bay between these islands and the Reeves Peninsula. Beyond this peninsula the Gerry Glacier extends into the bay to the west of the Sulzberger Ice Shelf, which extends to the north past Kizer Island and Cronenwett Island to Vollmer Island at the eastern end of the bay.

== Discovery and name ==
Sulzberger Bay was discovered by the Byrd Antarctic Expedition (ByrdAE) on December 5, 1929. It was named by Byrd for Arthur Hays Sulzberger, publisher of The New York Times, a supporter of the Byrd expeditions in 1928–1930 and 1933–1935.

== Iceberg formation ==
The ice shelf released icebergs within a day of the 2011 Tōhoku earthquake and tsunami. Scientists have linked the ice calving to the tsunami reaching the ice shelf, some 13,600 kilometers (8,500 mi) away from the earthquake epicenter. The main iceberg was approximately the area of Manhattan Island. In total, the icebergs calved from the ice shelf totalled an area of nearly 125 kilometres (78 mi). This section of the shelf had not moved since 1946.

== White Islands ==
77°17′S 153°10′W. A group of ice-covered islands extending north–south for about 10 nanometres (3.9×10^{−7} in). They lie at the east margin of Swinburne Ice Shelf and near the terminus of Butler Glacier in the south part of Sulzberger Bay. This feature is rudely delineated on the map of the ByrdAE, 1928–30, as "low ice cliffs" that rise above the level of the ice shelf. The islands were mapped in detail by the United States Geological Survey (USGS) from surveys and United States Navy air photos, 1959-65. The name was applied by the United States Advisory Committee on Antarctic Names (US-ACAN) at the suggestion of Admiral Richard E. Byrd. Named for Doctor Paul Dudley White, internationally renowned specialist on heart diseases, who was a consultant on medical matters in regard to United States Navy Operation Highjump, 1946–47, led by Byrd.

=== Olson Island ===
77°14′S 153°17′W. The largest and northernmost of the ice-covered White Islands, in southern Sulzberger Bay. The feature is rudely delineated on the map of the ByrdAE, 1928–30, and is indicated as "low ice cliffs" that rise above the ice shelf in this part of the bay. Mapped in detail by USGS from surveys and United States Navy air photos, 1959-65. Named for Michael L. Olson, USARP ionospheric physicist at Byrd Station, winter party 1968, and a member of the Plateau Station summer party, 1968-69.

=== Webber Island ===
77°17′S 153°05′W. The large central island (between Olson Island and Chandler Island) of the White Islands in southern Sulzberger Bay. It is rudely delineated on the map of the ByrdAE, 1928–30, and indicated as "low ice cliffs" that rise above the ice shelf in this part of the bay. Mapped in detail by USGS from surveys and United States Navy air photos, 1959-65. Named for James Webber, USARP ionospheric physicist at Byrd Station, 1968-69 season.

=== Chandler Island ===
77°21′S 153°10′W. An island 4 nautical miles (7.4 km; 4.6 mi) long which is the southernmost of the ice-covered White Islands, located at the head of Sulzberger Bay. Mapped by USGS from surveys and United States Navy air photos, 1959-65. Named by US-ACAN for Alan Chandler, electrical engineer with the Byrd Station winter party in 1969.

== Other features ==
=== Richter Glacier ===
77°10′S 155°25′W. A low gradient coastal glacier located 10 nautical miles (19 km; 12 mi) west of Scott Nunataks on the north side of Edward VII Peninsula. The feature saddles with the Butler Glacier and flows northwest to the sea where it forms a small tongue. The glacier and tongue are depicted on the map of the ByrdAE, 1928-30. The map indicates that the landing party from the Kainan Mam (Shirase) traversed up this glacier to the summit of Scott Nunataks in January 1912. The glacier was mapped in detail by USGS from surveys and United States Navy air photos, 1959-65. Named by US-ACAN for Gregory S. Richter, meteorologist and scientific leader of the Byrd Station winter party in 1968.

=== Fisher Island ===
77°08′S 154°00′W. An ice-covered island 7 nautical miles (13 km; 8.1 mi) long, lying just north of Edward VII Peninsula where it marks the west side of the entrance to Sulzberger Bay. Mapped from surveys by the USGS and United States Navy air photos (1959–65). Named by US-ACAN for Wayne Fisher of the United States Department of State.

=== Swinburne Ice Shelf ===
77°10′S 153°55′W. An ice shelf just north of Edward VII Peninsula and the Alexandra Mountains in the south part of Sulzberger Bay. The ice shelf is 20 nautical miles (37 km; 23 mi) long and 5 nautical miles (9.3 km; 5.8 mi) wide and extends from Fisher Island to the White Islands. It was photographed from aircraft and mapped by the ByrdAE, 1928-30. Named by US-ACAN for Captain H.W Swinburne, Jr., Deputy Commander and Chief of Staff, United States Naval Support Force, Antarctica, during Deep Freeze 1970 and 1971.

=== Cumbie Glacier ===
77°13′S 154°12′W. A short, steep glacier just east of Scott Nuna'taks, flowing north into Swinburne Ice Shelf along the southwest side of Sulzberger Bay. Mapped by USGS from surveys and United States Navy air photos, 1959-66. Named by US-ACAN for William A. Cumbie, Jr., AT2, United States Navy. An aviation electronics technician, Cumbie was radioman on the ski-equipped R4D aircraft carrying R. Admiral George Dufek, United States Navy, that was first to land at the geographic South Pole, October 31, 1956.

=== Reeves Peninsula ===
77°24′S 152°20′W. A snow-covered peninsula along the north side of Edward VII Peninsula. It extends between the lower ends of the Dalton and Gerry Glaciers into southern Sulzberger Bay. This area was explored from the air and rudely mapped by the ByrdAE, 1928-30. The peninsula was mapped by USGS from surveys and United States Navy air photos, 1959-65. Named by US-ACAN, at the suggestion of Admiral R.E. Byrd, for John M. Reeves (of Reeves Brothers, Inc.) who assisted the ByrdAE of 1928-30 and 1933-35 with contributions of sheepskin-lined coats, and by the development and donation of windproof material for cold weather clothing.

=== Gerry Glacier ===
77°24′S 152°05′W. A glacier on Edward VII Peninsula, flowing north between Reeves Peninsula and Howard Heights to the head of Sulzberger Bay. Features in this area were photographed from the air and mapped by the ByrdAE, 1928–30 and 1933-35. This glacier was mapped by USGS from surveys and United States Navy air photos, 1959-65. Named by US-ACAN (at the suggestion of R. Admiral R.E. Byrd) for United States Senator Peter G. Gerry of Rhode Island, long time friend of the Byrd family and contributor to the ByrdAE, 1933-35.

=== Sulzberger Basin ===
77°0′S 152°30′W. An undersea basin on the central Ross shelf named in association with the Sulzberger Bay.

== Sources ==
- Alberts, Fred G., ed. (1995), Geographic Names of the Antarctic (PDF) (2 ed.), United States Board on Geographic Names This article incorporates public domain material from websites or documents of the United States Board on Geographic Names.
- Alexandra Mountains, USGS: United States Geological Survey
- Brunt, Kelly M.; Okal, Emile A.; MacAyeal, Douglas R. (27 April 2011), "Antarctic ice-shelf calving triggered by the Honshu (Japan)" (PDF), Journal of Glaciology, 57 (205): 785–788, doi:10.3189/002214311798043681
- Guest Peninsula, USGS: United States Geological Survey
- "Japan Tsunami Broke Huge Icebergs Off Antarctica", Livescience.com, August 8, 2011
- "Sulzberger Basin", Geographic Names Information System, United States Geological Survey, United States Department of the Interior
- This article incorporates public domain material from websites or documents of the United States Geological Survey.
