= Alexandra Mountains =

Mountain range in Antarctica

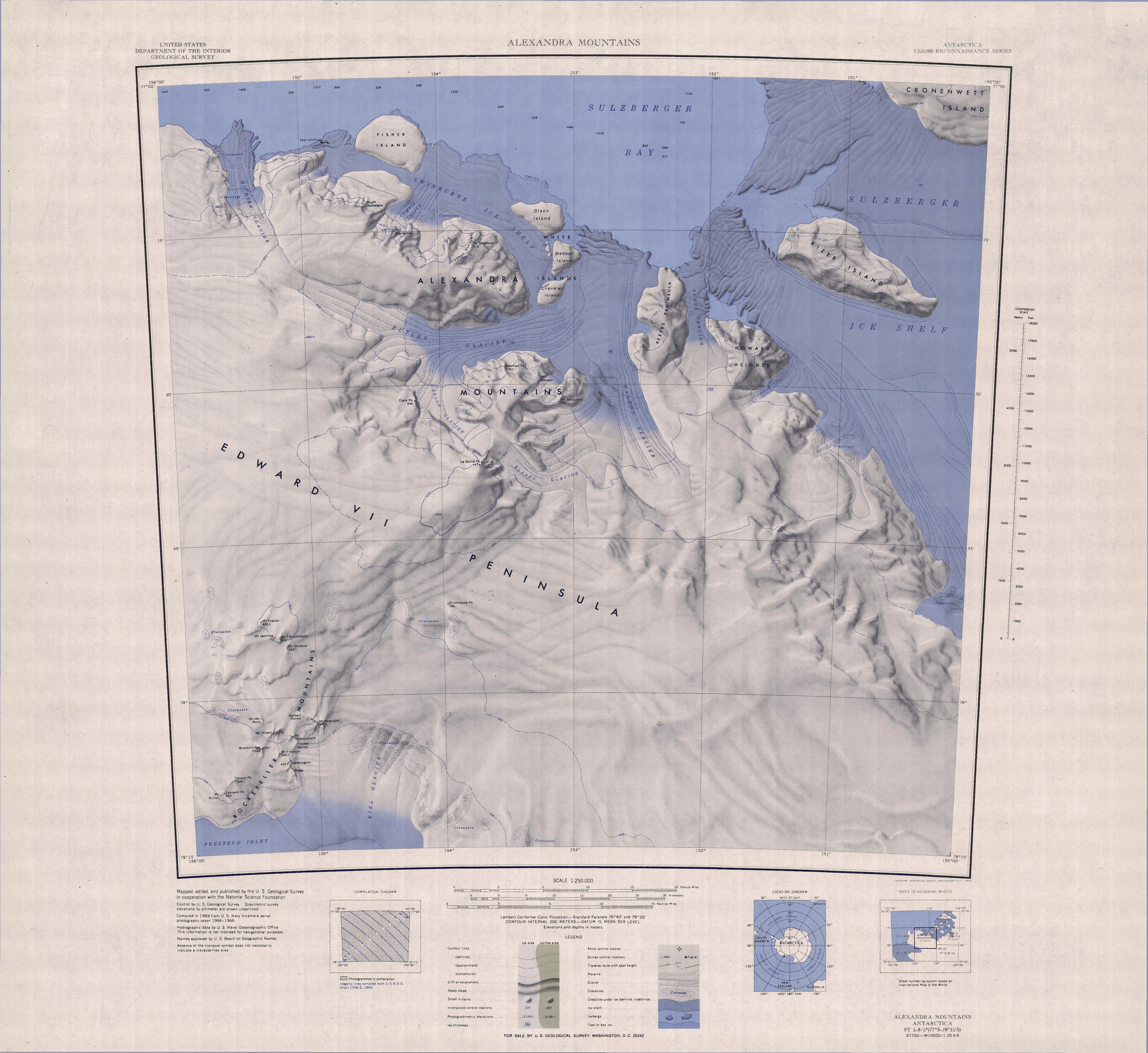

Geography
- Location within Antarctica
- Range coordinates: 77°25′S 153°30′W

The Alexandra Mountains (77°25′S 153°30′W) are a group of low, separated mountains in the north portion of Edward VII Peninsula, just southwest of Sulzberger Bay in Marie Byrd Land, Antarctica.

== Discovery and name ==
The Alexandra Mountains were discovered in January–February 1902 by the British National Antarctic Expedition (BrNAE) during an exploratory cruise of the Discovery along the Ross Ice Shelf. They were named for Alexandra of Denmark, then Queen of the United Kingdom.

== Location ==
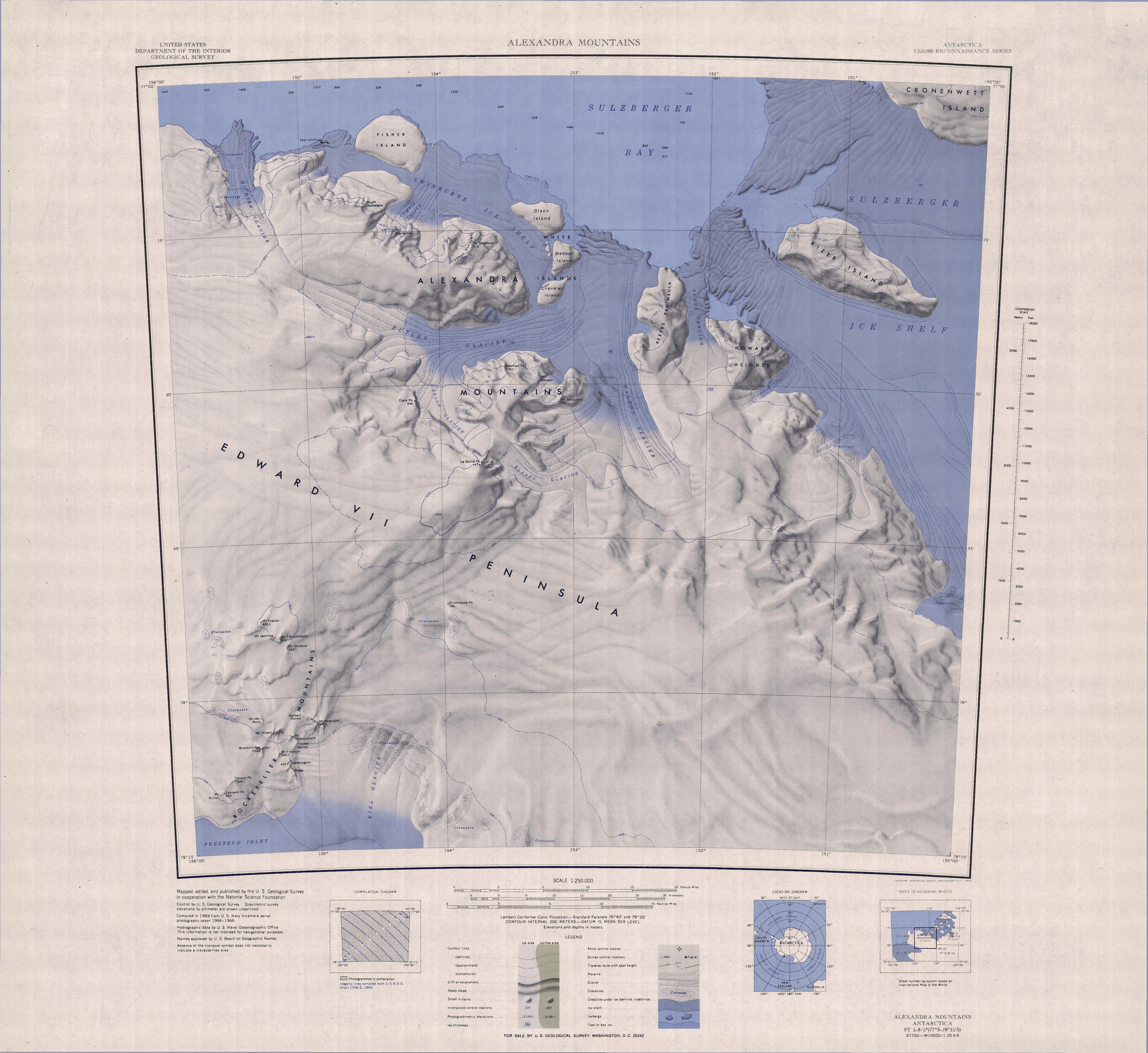
Context: Rockefeller Mountains in southwest of map

The Alexandra Mountains are on the north side of the Edward VII Peninsula, to the north of the Rockefeller Mountains. They lie on both sides of the Butler Glacier, which flows from west to east, then turns north to enter Sulzberger Bay. Other glaciers include Cumbie Glacier, flowing from Mount Youngman, Larson Glacier, which feeds Butler Glacier, Dalton Glacier to the west and Blades Glacier to the south. Northern features, from northwest to southeast, include Scott Nunataks, Mount Youngman, Sneddon Nunataks and Mount Swadener. Southern features include Clark Peak, La Gorce Peak, Bowman Peak, Mount Manger and Mount Josephine.

== Northern features ==
=== Scott Nunataks ===
77°14′S 154°12′W. Conspicuous twin elevations which form the north end of the Alexandra Mountains on Edward VII Peninsula. Discovered in 1902 by the BrNAE under Captain Robert Falcon Scott, Royal Navy. Named after Scott by Lieutenant K. Prestrud, leader of the Eastern Sledge Party of Amundsen's Norwegian expedition who ascended the features while exploring Edward VII Peninsula in 1911.

=== Mount Youngman ===
77°15′S 154°21′W. A snow-covered coastal mountain 620 metres (2,030 ft) high, 4 nautical miles (7.4 km; 4.6 mi) southeast of Scott Nunataks. It stands at the head of Cumbie Glacier and overlooks Swinburne Ice Shelf and Sulzberger Bay which are just northward. Mapped by the United States Geological Survey (USGS) from surveys and United States Navy air photos, 1964–66. Named by the United States Advisory Committee on Antarctic Names (US-ACAN) for Captain Samuel A. Youngman, United States Navy, medical officer on the staff of the Commander, United States Naval Support Force, Antarctica, during Operation Deep Freeze 1969 and 1970.

=== Sneddon Nunataks ===
77°17′S 153°46′W. A group of coastal nunataks on the north side of Edward VII Peninsula which overlooks the Swinburne Ice Shelf and Sulzberger Bay. They stand 11 nautical miles (20 km; 13 mi) east-southeast of Scott Nunataks in the north part of Alexandra Mountains. The nunataks appear on the map of the Byrd Antarctic Expedition (ByrdAE), 1928–30. Named by US-ACAN for Donald L. Sneddon, United States Navy, electronics technician with the Byrd Station winter party in 1967.

=== Mount Swadener ===
77°16′S 153°45′W. A peak in the Sneddon Nunataks, in the north portion of the Alexandra Mountains. Mapped by USGS from surveys and United States Navy air photos, 1959–66. Named by US-ACAN for Lieutenant John R. Swadener, United States Navy, navigator of the ski-equipped R4D in which R. Admiral George Dufek made the first aircraft landing at the geographic South Pole, on October 31, 1956.

== Southern features ==
=== Clark Peak ===
77°31′S 154°12′W. A rock peak 645 metres (2,116 ft) high surmounting a bluff on the west side of Larson Glacier in northern Edward VII Peninsula. Mapped by USGS from surveys and United States Navy aerial photographs, 1964–67. Named by US-ACAN for Leroy Clark, member of the winter party of the Byrd Antarctic Expedition, 1933–35.

=== La Gorce Peak ===
77°37′S 153°22′W. Prominent summit 8 nautical miles (15 km; 9.2 mi) southwest of Mount Josephine, standing at the south end and marking the highest peak in the Alexandra Mountains. Discovered in February 1929 by the ByrdAE, and named by Byrd for John Oliver La Gorce.

=== Balsley Peak ===
77.6333333°S 153.6°W A distinctive peak, about 1,100 metres (3,600 ft) high, located 1.4 nautical miles (2.6 km; 1.6 mi) southeast of LaGorce Peak. Named by Advisory Committee on Antarctic Names (US-ACAN) (2004) after James R. Balsley, U.S. Geological Survey, who conducted airborne magnetometer near this peak during United States Navy Operation Highjump, 1946–47. Later he was Chief, Branch of Geophysics, U.S. Geological Survey (USGS).

=== Bowman Peak ===
77°29′S 153°13′W. Peak on the south side of Butler Glacier, in the Alexandra Mountains. Discovered by the ByrdAE in 1929 and named for John McEntee Bowman, president of the Bowman Biltmore Hotels Corporation, who donated headquarters for the preparation of the expedition.

=== Mount Manger ===
77°29′S 153°15′W. A snow-covered mountain located 3 nautical miles (5.6 km; 3.5 mi) northwest of Mount Josephine. The mountain was photographed from the air and roughly mapped by the ByrdAE, 1928–30. Named by US-ACAN (at the suggestion of Rear Admiral Richard E. Byrd) for William Manger, of the family that owned the Manger Hotel chain, who assisted Byrd expeditions by providing free room for office space and for expedition personnel.

=== Mount Josephine ===
77°33′S 152°48′W. Peak marked by prominent rock outcrops, 6 nautical miles (11 km; 6.9 mi) southeast of Bowman Peak. Discovered by Rear Admiral Byrd while on the ByrdAE Eastern Flight of December 5, 1929, and named by him during the ByrdAE (1933–35) for Josephine Clay Ford, daughter of Edsel Ford, contributor to both expeditions.

== Sources ==
- Alberts, Fred G., ed. (1995), Geographic Names of the Antarctic (PDF) (2 ed.), United States Board on Geographic Names This article incorporates public domain material from websites or documents of the United States Board on Geographic Names.
- Alexandra Mountains, USGS: United States Geological Survey
- "Balsley Peak", Geographic Names Information System, United States Geological Survey, United States Department of the Interior
- This article incorporates public domain material from websites or documents of the United States Geological Survey.
