= King Edward VII Land =

Peninsula which forms part of Marie Byrd Land in Antarctica

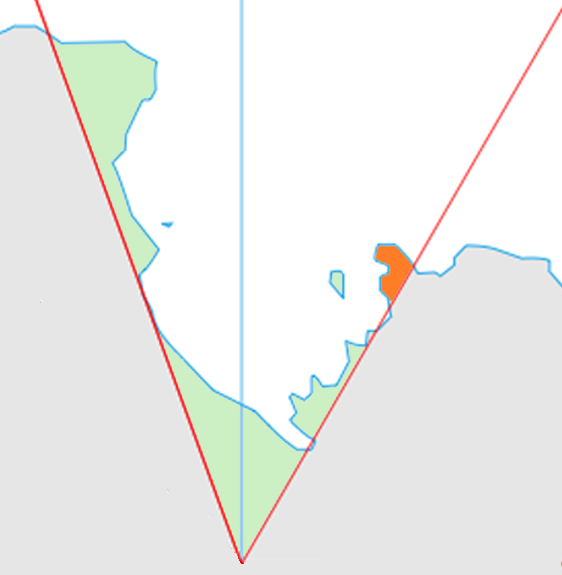
Location of King Edward VII Land (marked in orange) within the Ross Dependency

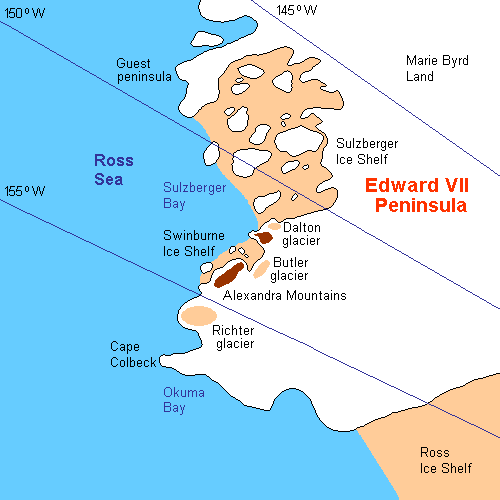
Area map of Edward VII Peninsula

King Edward VII Land or King Edward VII Peninsula is a large, ice-covered peninsula which forms the northwestern extremity of Marie Byrd Land in Antarctica. The peninsula projects into the Ross Sea between Sulzberger Bay and the northeast corner of the Ross Ice Shelf, and forms part of the Ross Dependency. Edward VII Peninsula is defined by the Ross Ice Shelf on the southwest, Okuma Bay on the west, and to the east by Sulzberger Bay and the Saunders Coast, all essentially on the Ross Sea / Southern Ocean in Antarctica. The northwest extremity of the peninsula is Cape Colbeck. Edward VII Peninsula is located at 77°40′S 155°00′W.

The western coast is Shirase Coast. In the north and east the Swinburne Ice Shelf is located. Edward VII Peninsula was discovered on 30 January 1902 by the British National Antarctic Expedition (BrNAE) (1901–1904) under Robert Falcon Scott, who named it King Edward VII Land for King Edward VII of the United Kingdom. The coastline was further explored by the Nimrod Expedition under Ernest Shackleton in 1908–09, and the first landfall was made by a party of the Japanese Antarctic Expedition led by Shirase Nobu in 1912. The region was renamed "Edward VII Peninsula" after the peninsular character of the region was determined by exploration conducted by the Byrd Antarctic Expedition (1933–1935) and the United States Antarctic Service (USAS) Expedition (1939–1941).

Most of the peninsula is within the Ross Dependency, claimed by New Zealand (see Territorial claims of Antarctica).

== Gallery ==
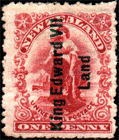
New Zealand stamp overprinted for use at the British base

== See also ==
- Fokker Rocks
