= Adolf Lindstrøm =

Norwegian chef and polar explorer

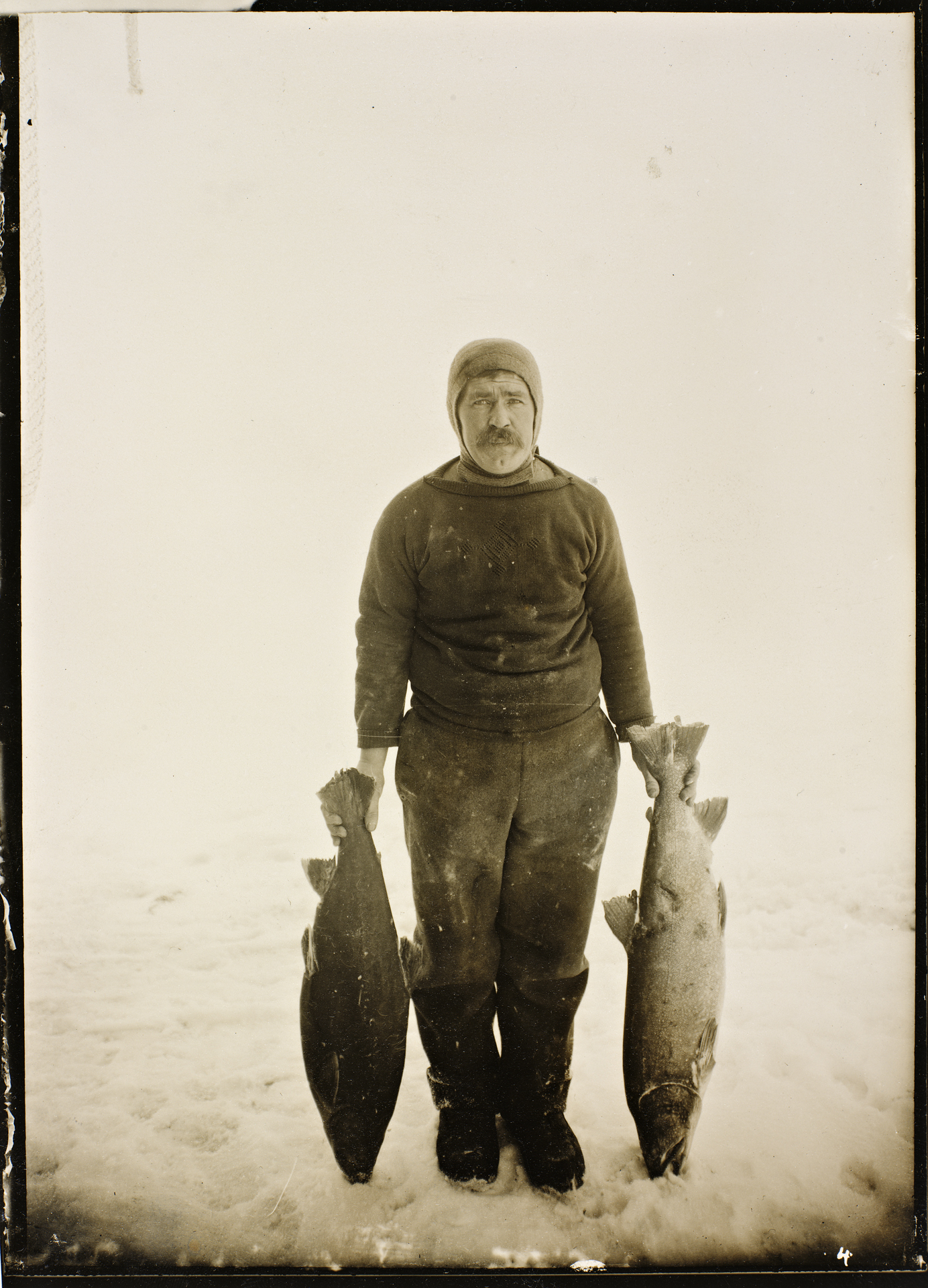
"Polar chef" Adolf Lindstrøm with samples of fish on King William Island in 1904

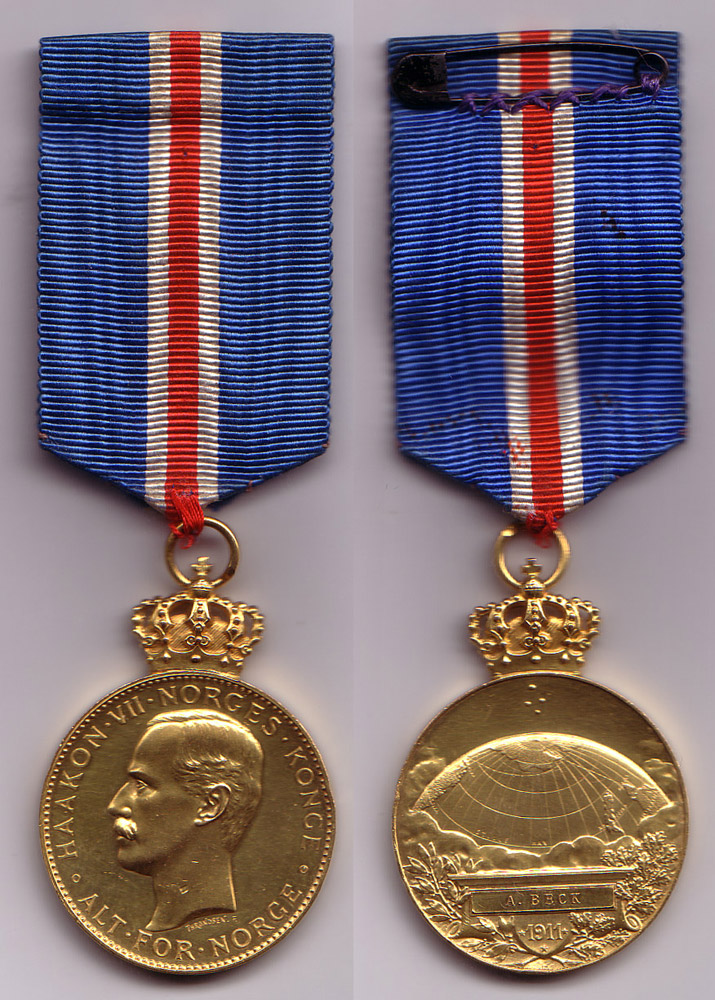
Lindstrøm was awarded the South Pole Medal for his participation in Roald Amundsen's South Pole expedition.

Adolf Henrik Lindstrøm (May 17, 1866 – September 21, 1939) was a Norwegian chef and polar explorer.

Lindstrøm was born in Hammerfest. He was of Kven origin. He took part in Otto Sverdrup's Fram expedition from 1898 to 1902. Later he traveled with Roald Amundsen during his navigation of the Northwest Passage in the Gjøa from 1903 to 1906, and in the South Pole expedition of 1910 to 1912. He also took part in an expedition to Siberia from 1914 to 1916. Lindstrøm died in Oslo.

Lindstrøm was a large, jovial man and he rarely left the ship, unlike other expedition participants. The only thing that could lure him out was the opportunity to hunt ptarmigan because fresh meat was appreciated on the long expeditions. Lindstrøm was also a dispassionate man and an asset to the crew when "polar nerves" got to them and homesickness arose during the long polar night after several years in the ice. Roald Amundsen wrote in his diary on April 5, 1911, "He has rendered greater and more valuable services to the Norwegian polar expedition than any other man."

In 1906, Lindstrøm was named a knight of the Order of St. Olav "for bold nautical achievement". He received the Fram Medal and the South Pole Medal.

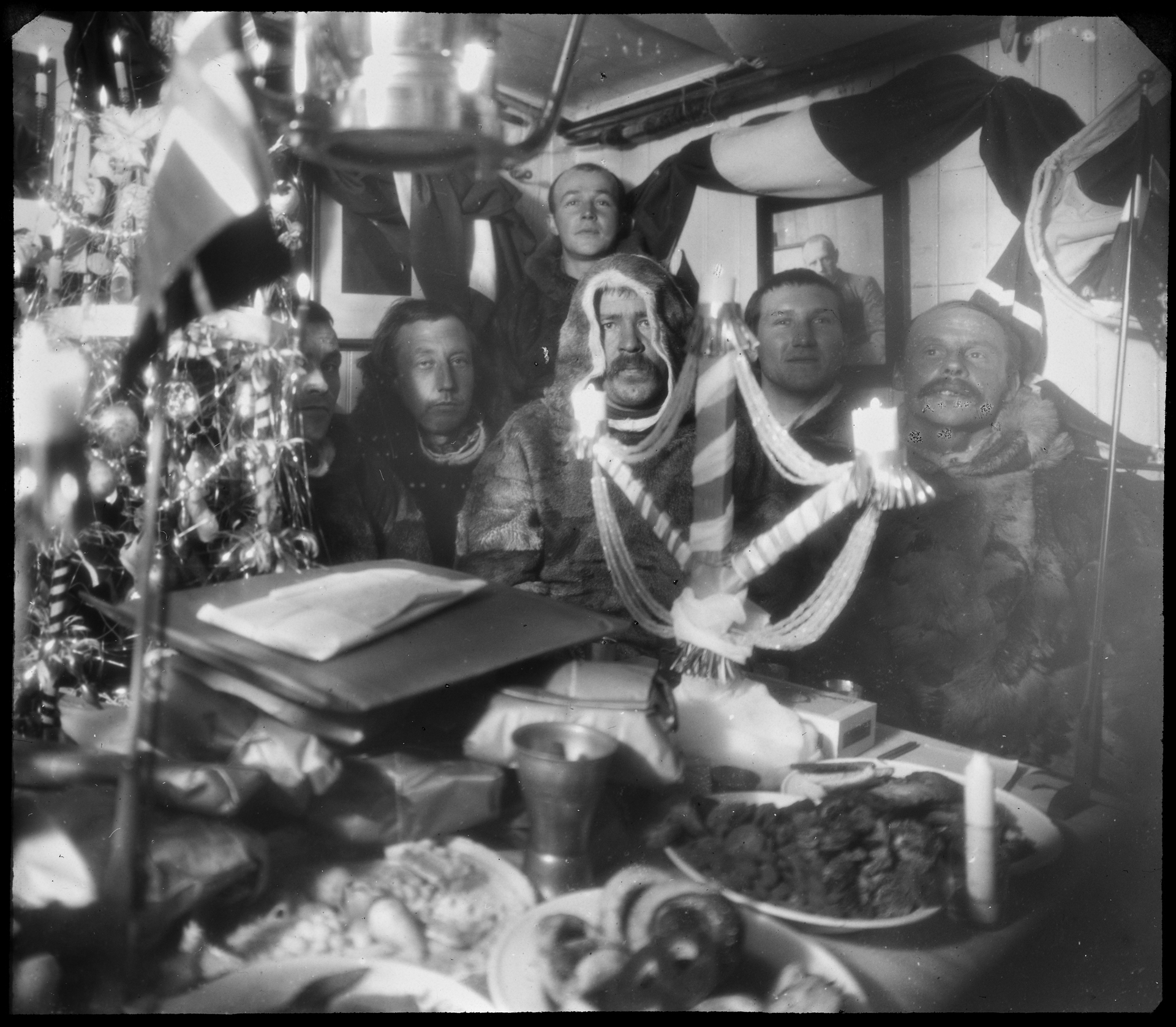
Roald Amundsen and crew on the Gjøa celebrating Christmas in Gjoa Haven in Nunavut, Canada, in 1903 during the trip to the Northwest Passage. Helmer Hanssen, Amundsen, Lindstrøm, Gustav Wiik, and Anton Lund are seated at the table, and Peder Ristvedt is standing behind them.

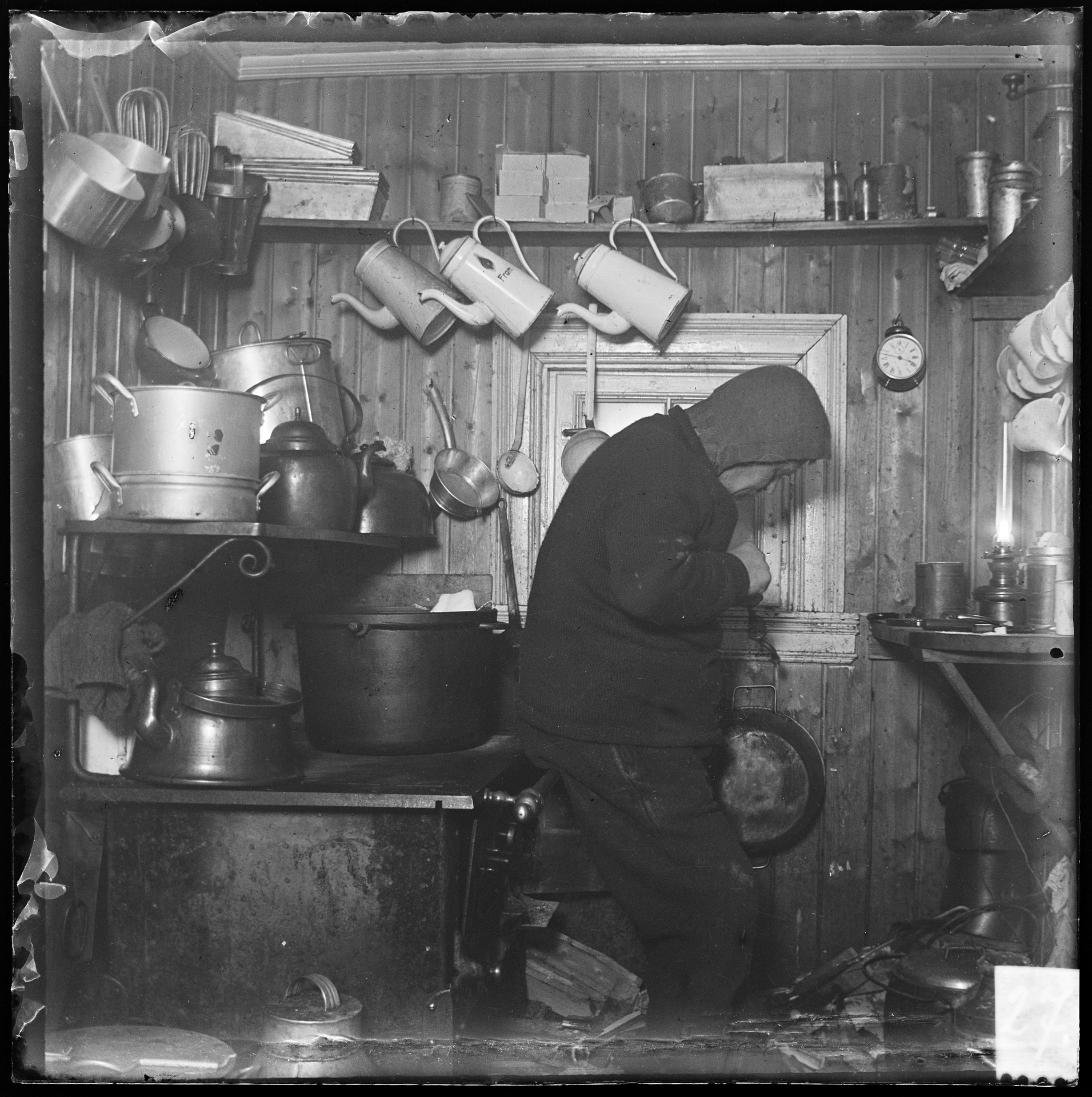
Adolf Henrik Lindstrøm in the kitchen at Framheim, Amundsen's base in Antarctica during the expedition to the South Pole, 1910–1913

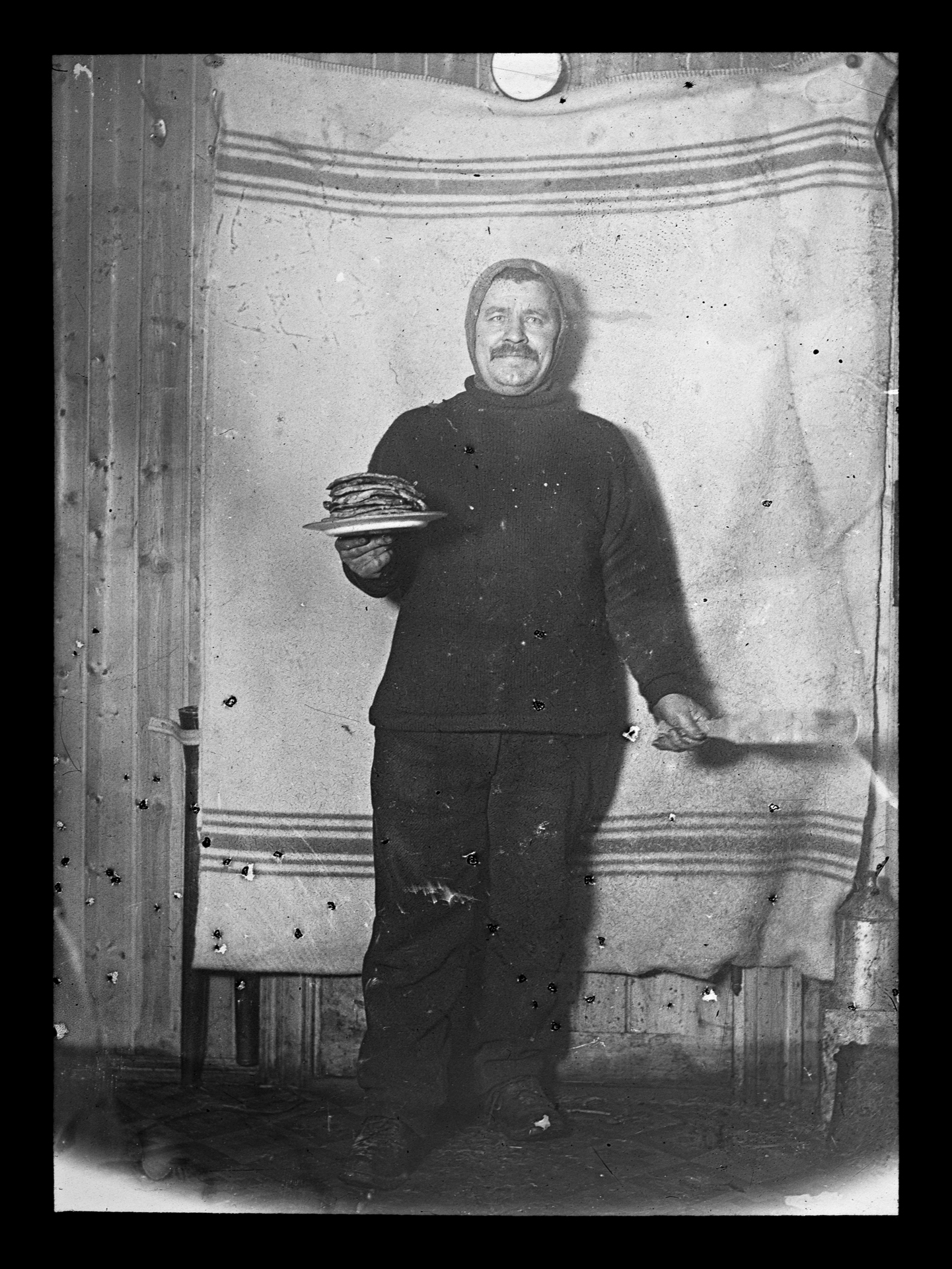
Adolf Lindstrøm with a plate of pancakes at Framheim in 1911

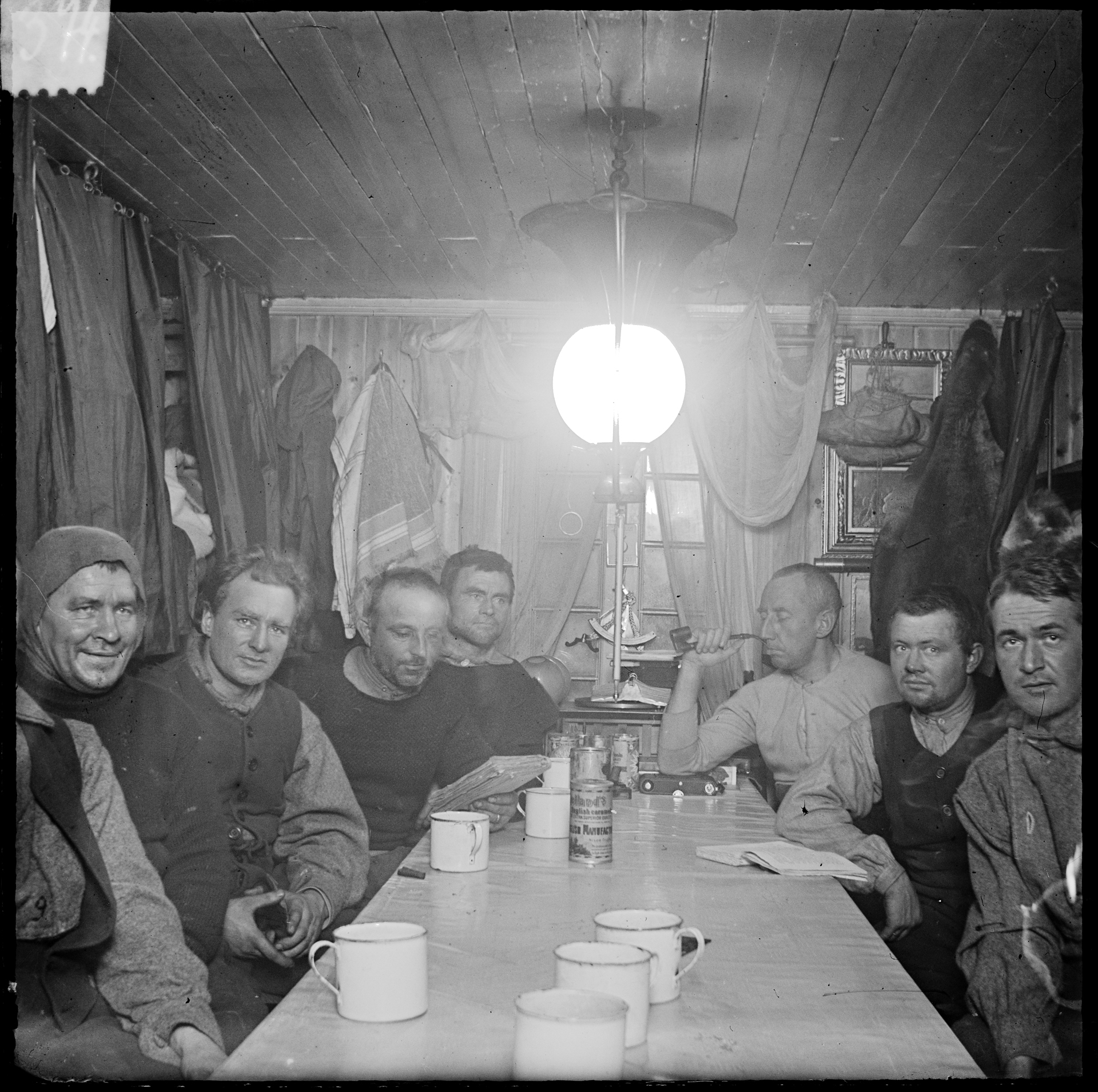
Adolf Lindstrøm, Sverre Hassel, Oscar Wisting, Helmer Hanssen, Roald Amundsen, Jørgen Stubberud, and Kristian Prestrud in the hut at Framheim. Roald Amundsen is resting his elbow on a camera.

== Legacy ==
In 2017 a bronze sculpture of Lindstrøm made by Håkon Anton Fagerås was unveiled in Hammerfest.

Lindstrøm was portrayed by Jon Eikemo in the 1985 Central Television serial The Last Place on Earth.
