= Polheim =

Polheim Camp
- Antarctic Camp
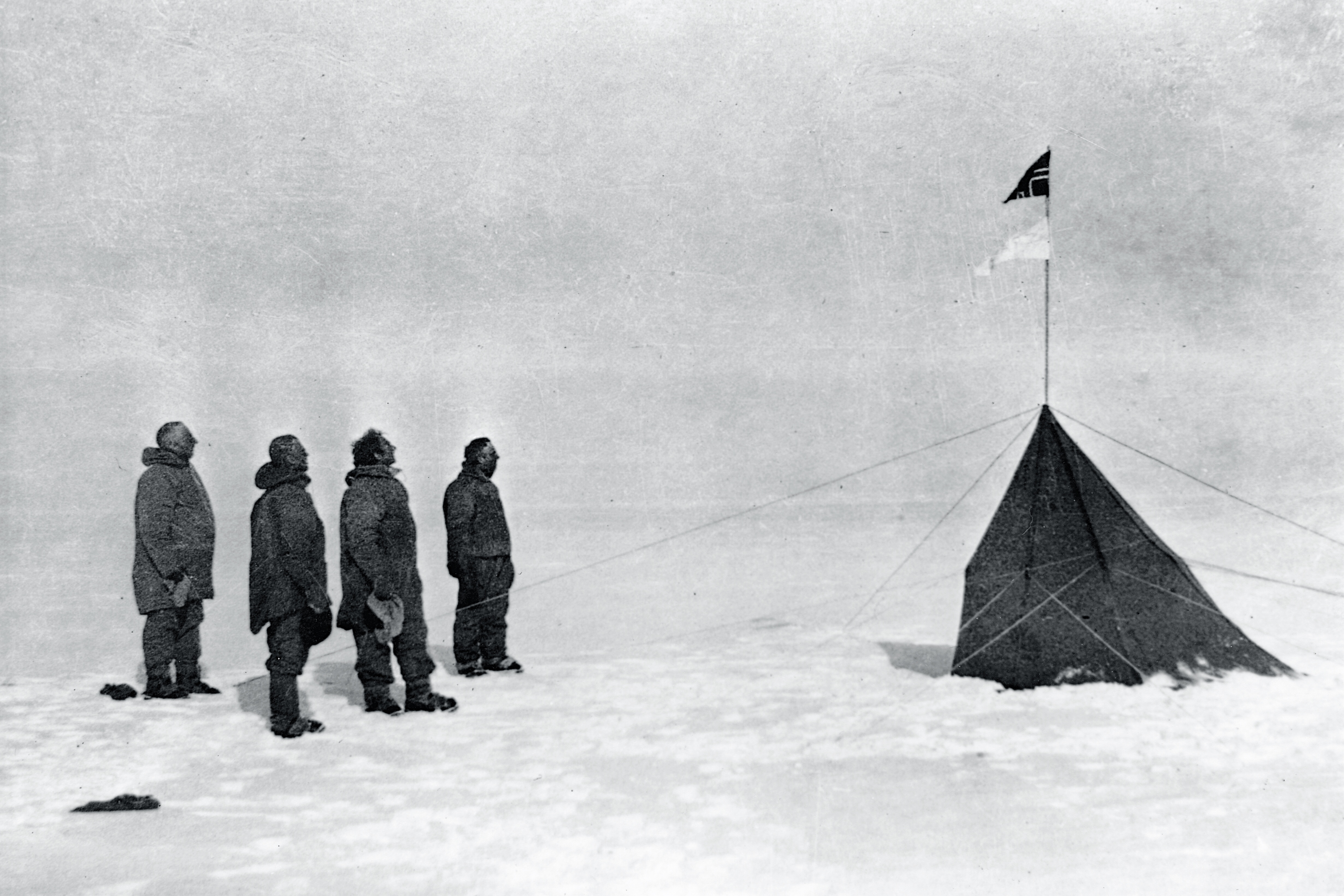
- Amundsen (at left) and companions at Polheim, South Pole, December 1911

- Location of Polheim in Antarctica
- Coordinates: 90°00′00″S 0°00′00″E
- Country: Norway
- Location in Antarctica: South Pole; Antarctica
- Established: 14 December 1911
- Evacuated: 18 December 1911
- Type: Transitory
- Status: Abandoned

Polheim ("Home at the Pole") was Roald Amundsen's name for his camp (the first) at the South Pole. He arrived there on 14 December 1911, along with four other members of his expedition: Helmer Hanssen, Olav Bjaaland, Oscar Wisting, and Sverre Hassel.

== Calculations ==
Fram's flag, hoisted beneath the Norwegian flag atop the Polheim tent.

At the first estimated position of the South Pole, Amundsen declared "So we plant you, dear flag, on the South Pole, and give the plain on which it lies the name King Haakon VII's Plateau." Both the Norwegian and Fram's flag were planted.

Due to the historical disputes over the claims of polar explorers prior to Amundsen's expedition, particularly the competing claims of Frederick Cook and Robert Peary to have reached the North Pole first, Amundsen took special care in making his polar observations.

Approaching the Geographic South Pole (or North Pole) the meridians of longitude converge, eventually making a measure of longitude meaningless, as a degree of longitude will become smaller and smaller. At the pole itself, assuming one has accurate enough instruments, all meridians meet. Amundsen reasoned that the extra effort in obtaining longitude could be saved, and he focused on latitude. Amundsen had adopted this strategy after attending a lecture at The Royal Geographical Society in London in November 1909, given by the British astronomer and geographer, Arthur Robert Hinks. In his lecture on Surveying and Cartography at Cambridge University, Hinks put forward this theory when discussing the subject of determining positions near the Pole.

With the instruments he had, Amundsen estimated that he could determine the position of the pole by no better than a nautical mile (1.85 km). In order to ensure that there was no doubt that his expedition had in fact reached the South Pole, he determined to encircle, or "box" the pole.

Three members of the expedition were sent out from the current estimated position of the pole, one continuing on the current expedition track and two at right angles to this direction. Each skier continued 10 miles (16 km) and erected a spare sledge runner with a black flag and note for Robert Falcon Scott when and if he arrived. Scott did not arrive until more than a month later. The note contained the position to Amundsen's camp.

While the skiers erected the encircling markers, Amundsen took altitudes of the sun for fixing his position. Since his theodolite had been damaged, observations were made with a sextant, the sun slowly circling the camp in 24 hours, and never setting.

From these calculations, Amundsen determined that their current position was approximately 5.5 miles (8.9 km) from the mathematical South Pole point. This point had been "boxed" by the skiers.

On 17 December Amundsen proceeded to his estimate of the true South Pole position, and took additional observations for 24 hours, two men standing watch for each observation, and co-signing each other's navigation books. Again, this was to ensure that there was no doubt as to the expedition attaining the pole. Four out of the five men in the polar party were trained navigators, Olav Bjaaland being the only one without such training.

From these calculations, it was determined that they were still 1.5 miles (2.4 km) from the pole, and two men were sent to erect additional pennants.

Finally, Amundsen added still more pennants to cover the remaining area. In this way, the pole had been boxed three times all told.

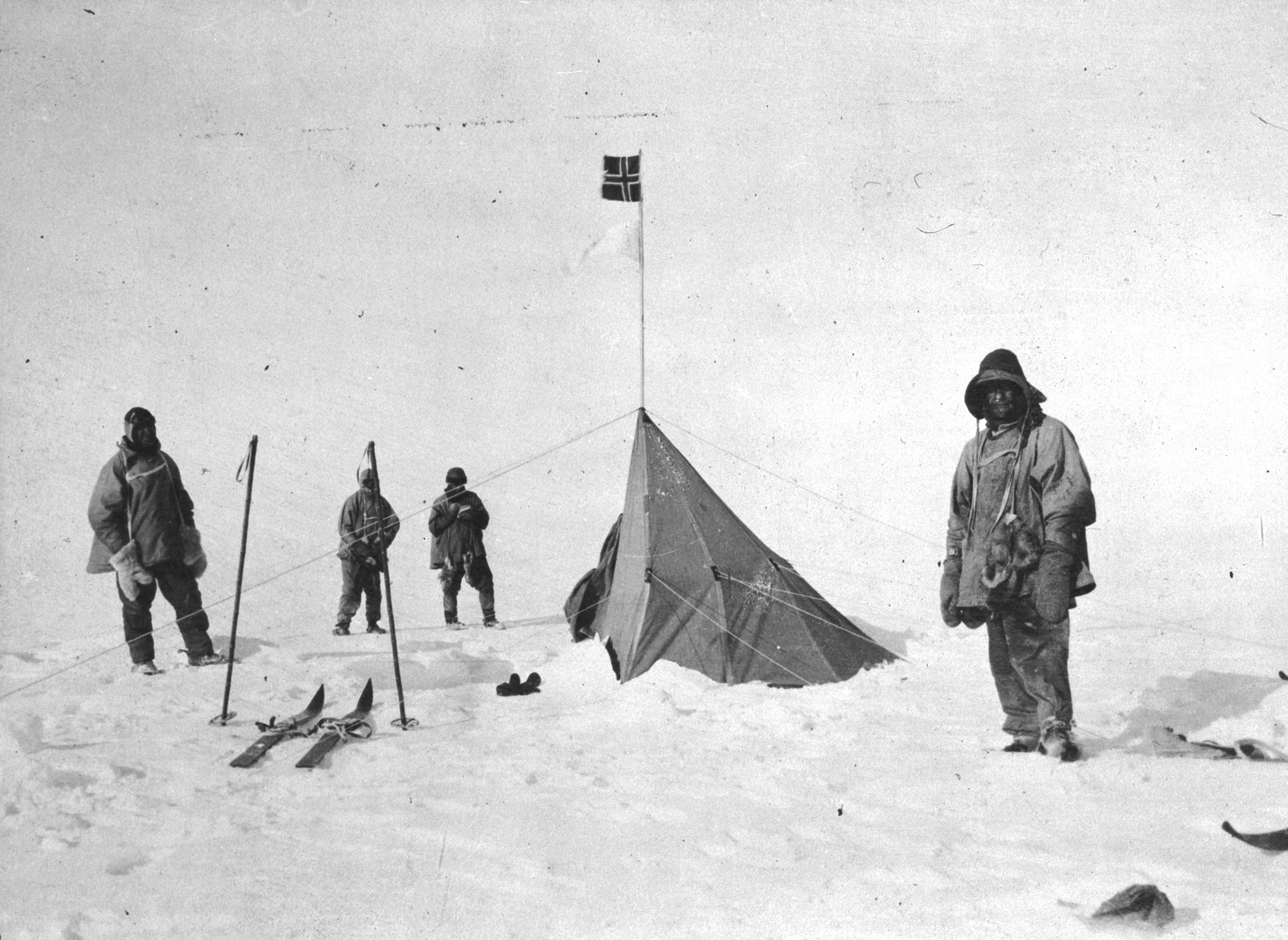
Scott (at left) and companions at Polheim, South Pole, January 1912.

The official expedition camera had been damaged en route to the pole, so the only photographs taken were from an amateur camera brought by expedition member Olav Bjaaland.

On 18 December 1911, Amundsen's expedition left Polheim, leaving behind his reserve tent, along with a letter for Scott and a letter intended for Scott to deliver to King Haakon VII in case Amundsen failed to return. Both letters were later found with the bodies of Scott and his companions, and were further proof that Amundsen had attained the pole.

When Amundsen's calculations were verified, it was found that his final camp lay within 2.3 km (2500 yards) of the mathematical South Pole. In addition, it had been ascertained that expedition member Helmer Hanssen—one of the expedition members who had been skiing in a grid pattern between the 'box' markers—came to within 180 metres (200 yards) of the mathematical South Pole on one of his runs.

== The tent ==
The tent has not been seen since Scott's party left it in January 1912. Determining the present location of Amundsen's tent requires consideration of the precision of Amundsen's navigation in 1911, the flow of ice since then, and the amount of burial by intervening snow fall. The present location of the tent (as of December 2011) has been calculated to be 89° 58′ 51″ S, 46° 14′ E, with around 300 metres (980 feet) uncertainty in the position. It probably lies 17 m (56 ft) below the present snow surface.

== See also ==
- Amundsen–Scott South Pole Station
- Framheim
- List of Antarctic Field Camps
