= Polar exploration =

Scientific exploration and research of Arctic and/or Antarctic regions

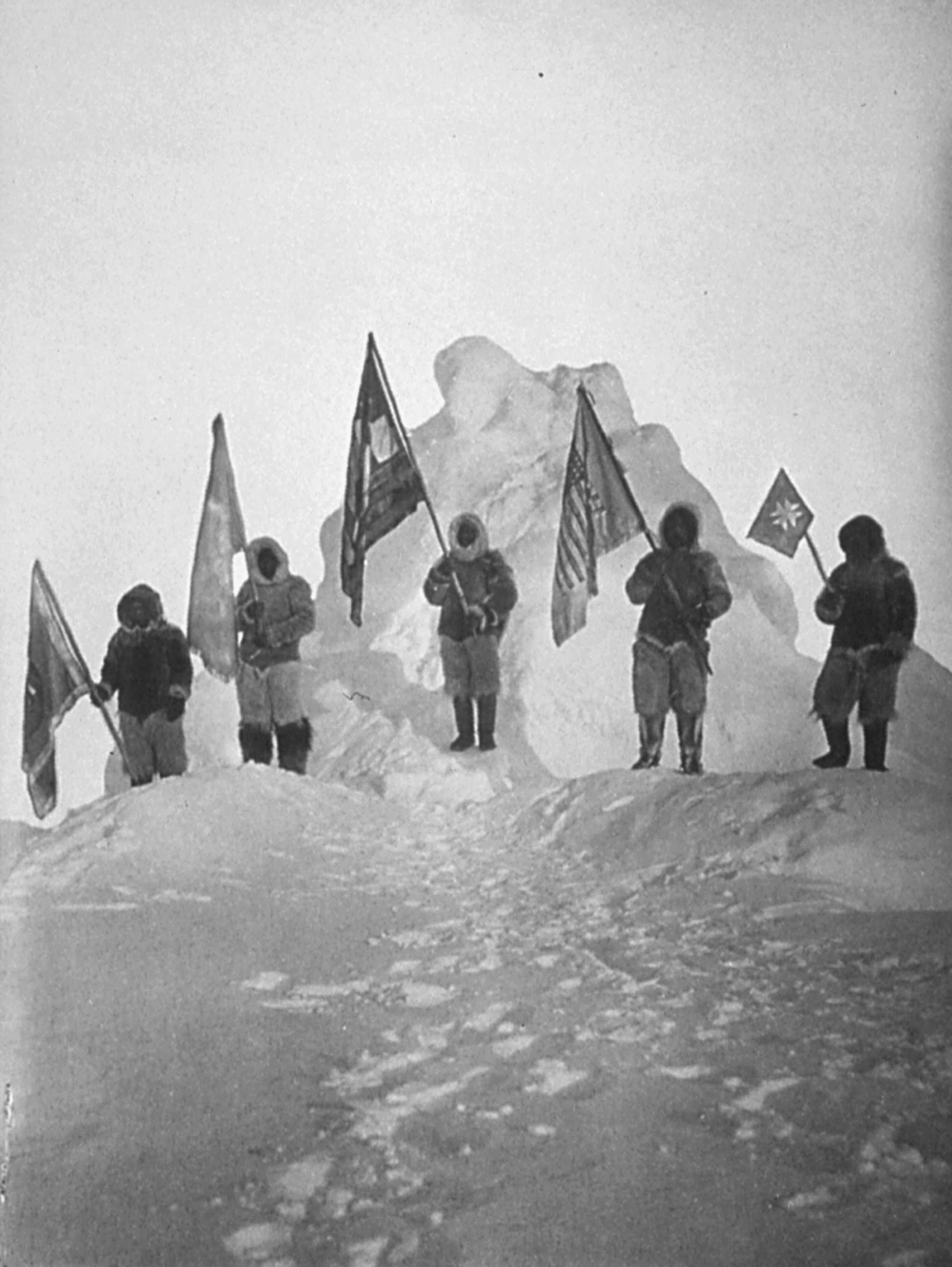
Matthew Henson and four Inuit men at the North Pole, taken by Robert Peary

Roald Amundsen, Helmer Hanssen, Sverre Hassel, and Oscar Wisting at the South Pole

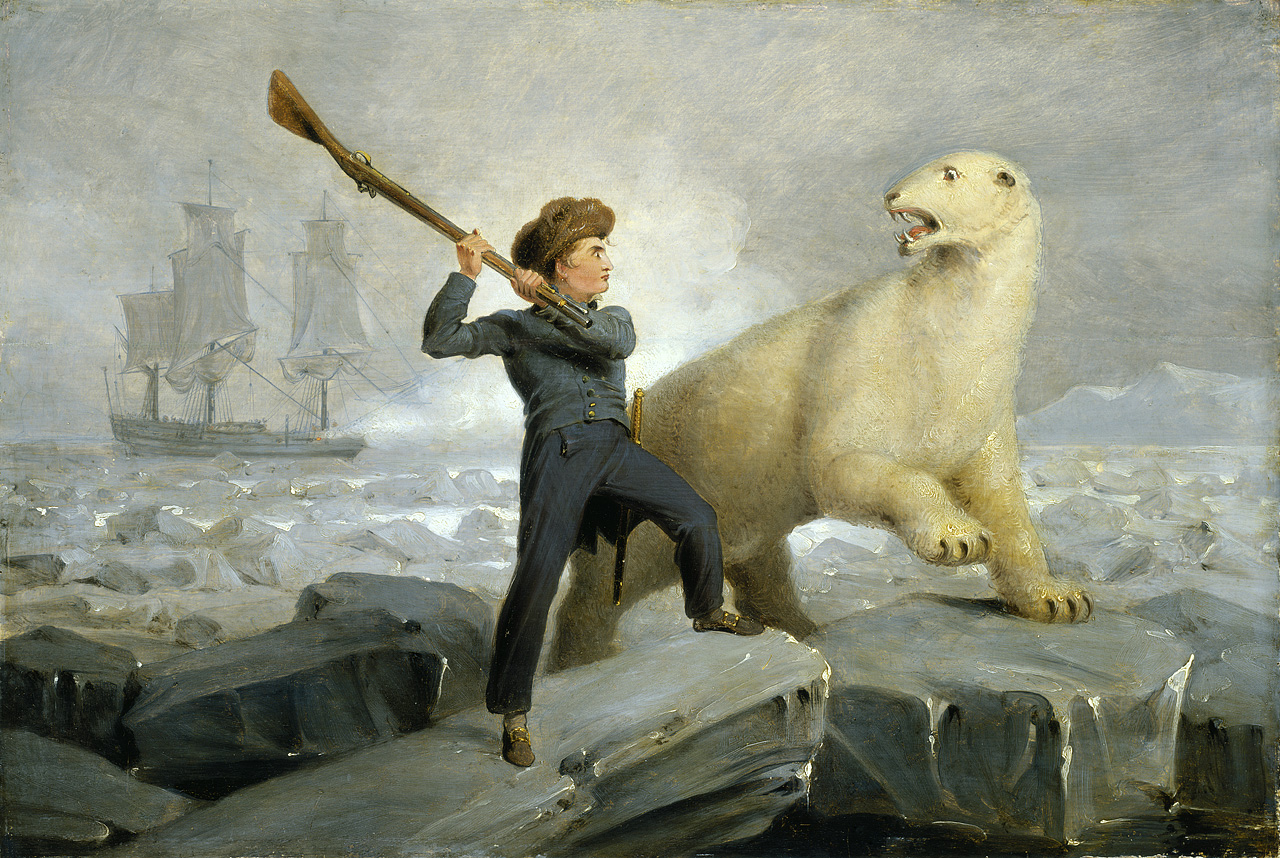
Nelson and the Bear by Richard Westall, 1809. It depicts the 1773 expedition to discover the Northwest Passage.

Polar exploration is the process of exploration of the polar regions of Earth – the Arctic region and Antarctica – particularly with the goal of reaching the North Pole and South Pole, respectively. Historically, this was accomplished by explorers making often arduous travels on foot or by sled in these regions, known as a polar expedition. More recently, exploration has been accomplished with technology, particularly with satellite imagery.

From 600 BC to 300 BC, Greek philosophers theorized that the planet was a Spherical Earth with North and South polar regions. By 150 AD, Ptolemy published Geographia, which notes a hypothetical Terra Australis Incognita. However, due to harsh weather conditions, the poles themselves would not be reached for centuries after that. When they finally were reached, the achievement was realized only a few years apart.

There are two claims, both disputed, about who were the first people to reach the geographic North Pole. Frederick Cook, accompanied by two Inuit men, Ahwelah and Etukishook, claimed to have reached the Pole on April 21, 1908, although this claim is generally doubted. On April 6, 1909, Robert Peary claimed to be the first person in recorded history to reach the North Pole, accompanied by his employee Matthew Henson and four Inuit men Ootah, Seegloo, Egingway, and Ooqueah.

Norwegian explorer Roald Amundsen had planned to reach the North Pole by means of an extended drift in an icebound ship. He obtained the use of Fridtjof Nansen's polar exploration ship Fram, and undertook extensive fundraising. Preparations for this expedition were disrupted when Cook and Peary each claimed to have reached the North Pole. Amundsen then changed his plan and began to prepare for a conquest of the geographic South Pole; uncertain of the extent to which the public and his backers would support him, he kept this revised objective secret. When he set out in June 1910, he led even his crew to believe they were embarking on an Arctic drift, and revealed their true Antarctic destination only when Fram was leaving their last port of call, Madeira.

Amundsen's South Pole expedition, with Amundsen and four others, arrived at the pole on 14 December 1911, five weeks ahead of a British party led by Robert Falcon Scott as part of the Terra Nova expedition. Amundsen and his team returned safely to their base, and later learned that Scott and his four companions had died on their return journey.

Australians have also been prominent in polar exploration. Sir Douglas Mawson, John Riddoch Rymill, and George Hubert Wilkins were three South Australian explorers who led all of the Australian expeditions undertaken before the government started taking a hand in polar exploration in the late 1940s. Mawson undertook several Antarctic expeditions, while the other two went to the Arctic as well.

== See also ==
- Antarctic exploration
- Arctic exploration
- List of polar explorers
- List of civil awards and decorations § Polar exploration
