= Andreas Beck (explorer) =

Norwegian explorer

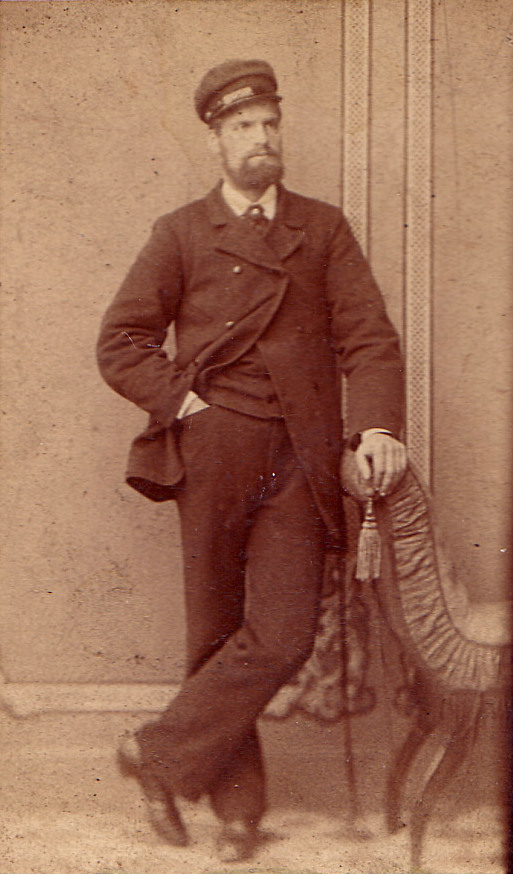
- Born: October 8, 1864; Balsfjord, Norway
- Died: March 18, 1914 (aged 49) near Montevideo, Uruguay
- Occupations: Seal-hunter, polar captain, ice captain, shipowner

Andreas Beck (October 8, 1864 – March 18, 1914) was a Norwegian seal-hunter, polar captain, ice captain, and shipowner.

== Early life ==
Beck was born in Balsfjord Municipality in Troms County, Norway. He was the son of the polar captain and shipowner Lars Andreas Beck from Balsfjord.

== Career ==
Beck began his life as a seaman on board his brother's ship Olivia, and later served on the sealer Harald Hårfager and the schooner and sealer William Barents. He traveled for many years as a harpooner aboard ships including the Søstrene, Diana, and Moderen. In 1896 he served as captain of the sailing sloop Aurora, and from 1903 to 1906 he captained his own boat, the Cesilie Malene, owned jointly with Lars Hansen Jr.

Beck captained the Holmengrå on a research expedition to Svalbard in 1908, and in 1909 he captained the sailing sloop Marie from Kristiania for Gunnar Holmsen's expedition to Spitsbergen. On November 16, 1909, Beck received the King's Medal of Merit in silver.

== With Amundsen ==
In the summer of 1910, Beck boarded the polar schooner Fram as an ice captain for Roald Amundsen's planned North Pole expedition. Few people knew that Amundsen had already planned a "detour" to the South Pole, and that Beck was actually brought in to guide the Fram through the southern polar ice. He signed a contract with Amundsen in April 1909, after Amundsen had been informed that his friend Frederick Cook had reached the North Pole, which was Amundsen's real goal.

Beck was recommended by Amundsen's friend and contact man in Tromso, the pharmacist and Morgenbladet correspondent Fritz Gottlieb Zapffe. Amundsen even traveled to Tromsø to obtain Beck's signature on the contract.

From Kristiansand, the Fram sailed to Madeira, where Beck and the rest of the crew were informed about the change of plans and were given the opportunity to withdraw from the expedition. All of them chose to continue.

After having guided the Fram through the polar ice much faster than anticipated and landing the expedition at the Bay of Whales in January 1911, Beck and the Fram departed for an oceanographic cruise lasting several months in the South Atlantic. Helmer Hanssen, one of the five men that Amundsen chose to accompany him to the South Pole, wrote the following in his book Gjennem Isbaksen. Atten År med Roald Amundsen (Through the Ice-Packs. Eighteen Years with Roald Amundsen): "Beck was a giant of a figure and, as usual for large, strong people, he had an outstanding good humor. Despite his size, nobody was faster in the rigging. He had that quality that certain ice captains have—he could sense the ice moving. Amundsen held Beck in high esteem and, when Beck had an opinion or suggestion, Amundsen went along with it."

In January 1912, Beck and the Fram returned to the Bay of Whales and retrieved the expedition, which had planted the Norwegian flag at the South Pole on December 14, 1911. They then traveled to Hobart, Tasmania and on to Buenos Aires, Argentina, where the Fram was laid up to await the expeditions continuation to the North Pole. In Buenos Aires, Norway's special envoy and plenipotentiary minister to Argentina, Paraguay, and Uruguay, Peter "Don Pedro" Christophersen, hosted a celebration and the expedition was awarded a medallion from the Norwegian La Plata Society. Beck and the rest of the crew traveled by passenger steamer to Oslo, where they were received by the king, and they received the Norwegian South Pole Medal (Sydpolsmedaljen), established by King Haakon to commemorate the expedition. Amundsen also gave each of the expedition participants a gold pocket watch decorated with the expedition participant's monogram and the inscription "Fram 1910–1912."

Beck received the King's Medal of Merit in gold in 1912.

== Death ==
In 1913, Beck traveled to Buenos Aires to inspect the Fram in preparation for Amundsen's expedition to the north. The journey took him to Panama, where the intention was to go through the new Panama Canal. However, difficulties with the canal work would have created too long a delay, and they decided to go south and around Cape Horn instead. Along the way, Beck fell ill and died on March 18, 1914. Beck was buried at sea (at 33°30′ S 49°30′ W) outside Montevideo, Uruguay. Amundsen was in Norway at the time and, for various reasons, canceled the expedition and sailed Fram back to Norway, which would be the vessel's last voyage. Amundsen traveled in person to Tromsø to offer his condolences to Beck's family and he gave Beck's widow Josephine NOK 10,000.

== Beck Peak ==
On Amundsen's map of the South Pole, Beck was honored by having a mountain named after him. Amundsen named an elevation at 87°20′ S 148°0′ E Andreas Becks Top (Andreas Beck Peak). After further research by the United States Geological Survey, which failed to identify the original mountain named for Beck, the Advisory Committee on Antarctic Names named Beck Peak after Beck, localized at 86°5′ S 158°58′ W.

== Film/TV ==
The television series The Last Place on Earth is a British seven-part serial from 1985 about the race to the South Pole featuring several well-known actors. Erik Bye played Andreas Beck in the series. Roald Amundsens sydpolsferd (Roald Amundsen's South Pole Journey) is a historical film released by the Norwegian Film Institute and it includes original footage from the South Pole expedition. Beck is visible in many of the scenes, and it is one of the few films to be listed in UNESCO's Memory of the World International Register.

== Gallery ==
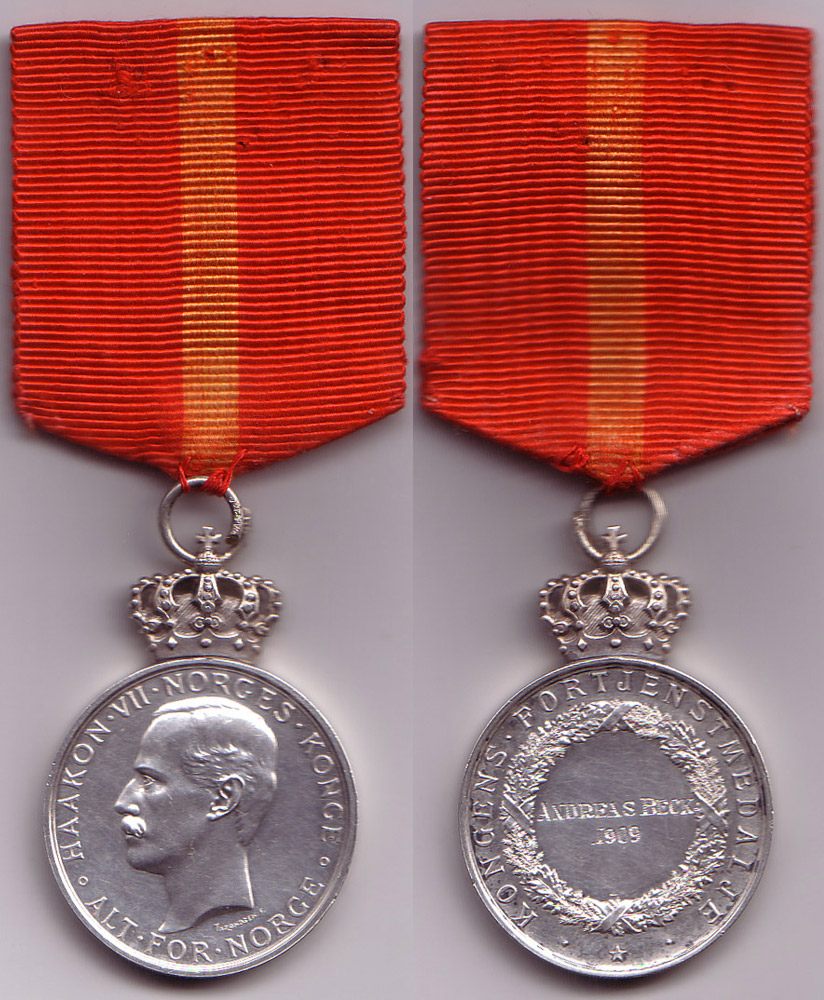
King's Medal of Merit in silver awarded to Beck

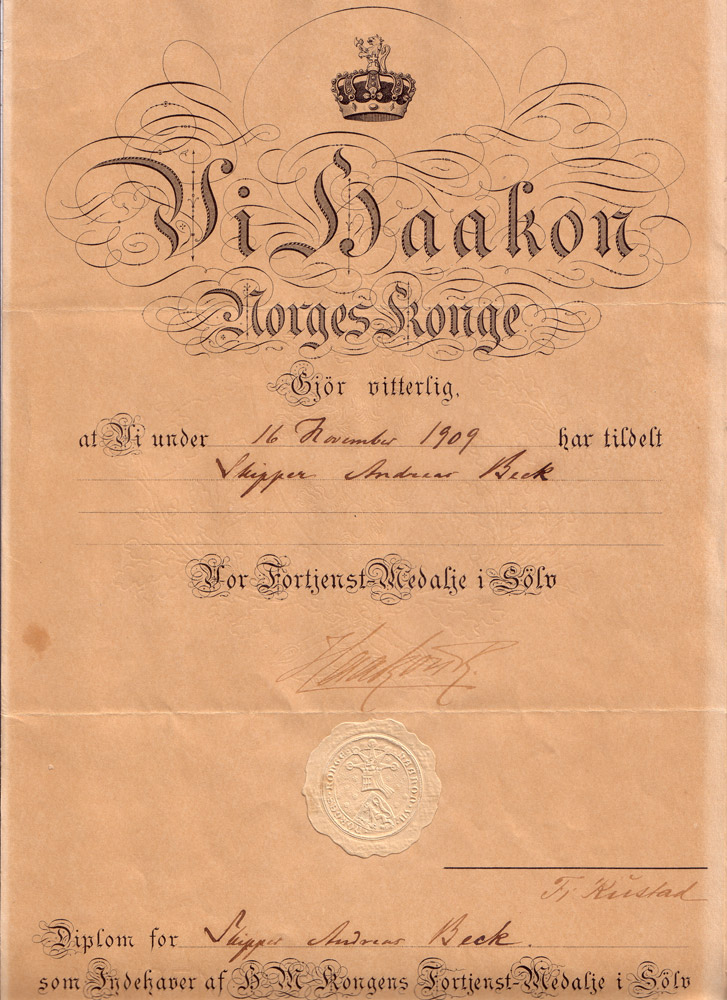
Certificate for the King's Medal of Merit in silver awarded to Beck

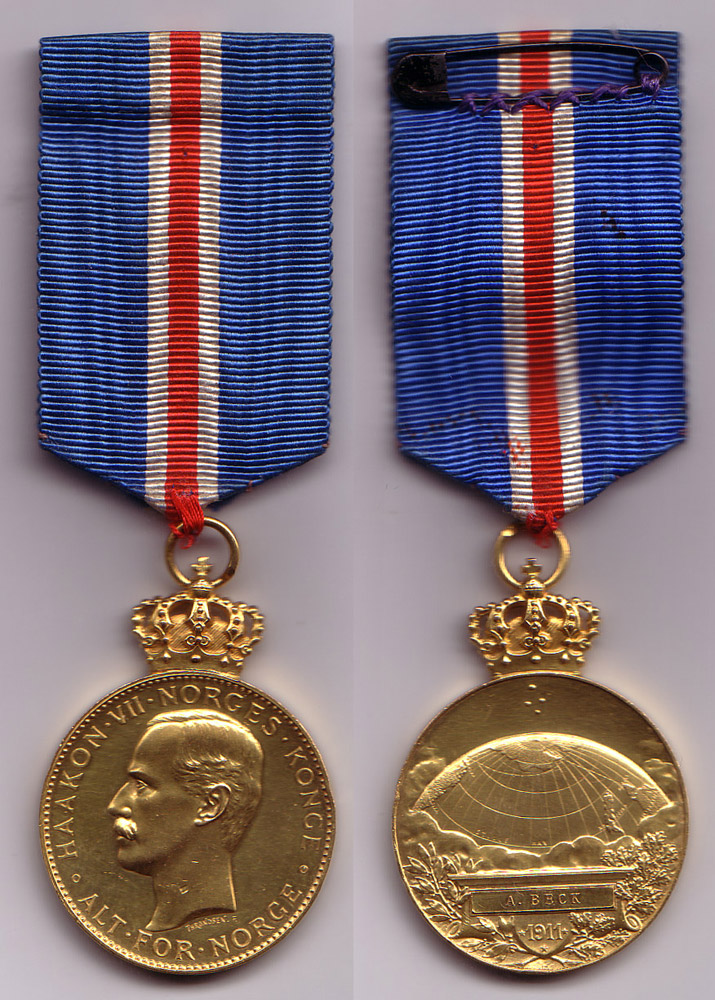
Norwegian South Pole Medal awarded to Beck

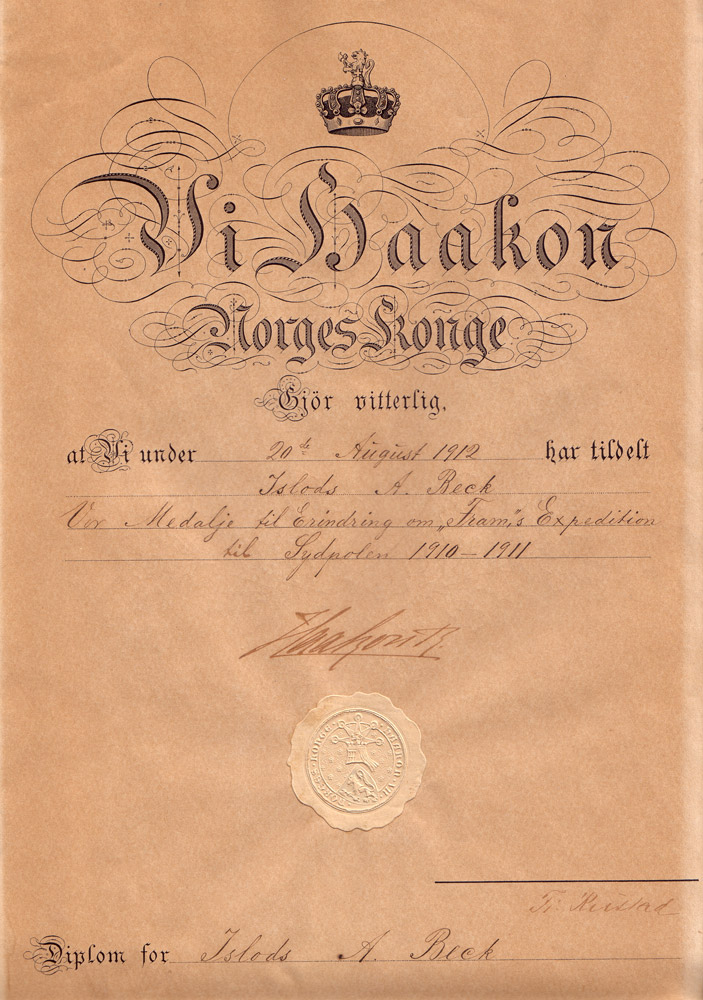
Certificate for the South Pole Medal awarded to Beck

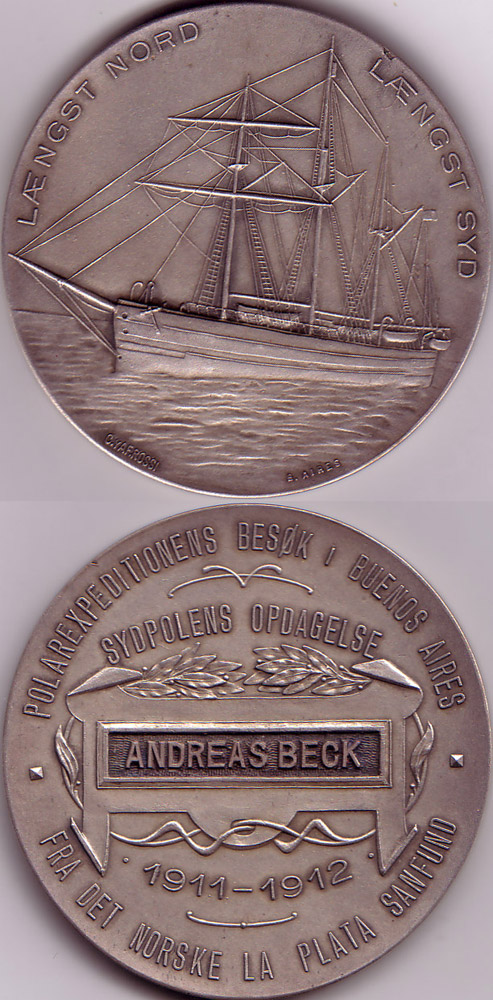
Medallion awarded to Beck by the Norwegian La Plata Society
