= Ivar Throndsen =

Norwegian engraver

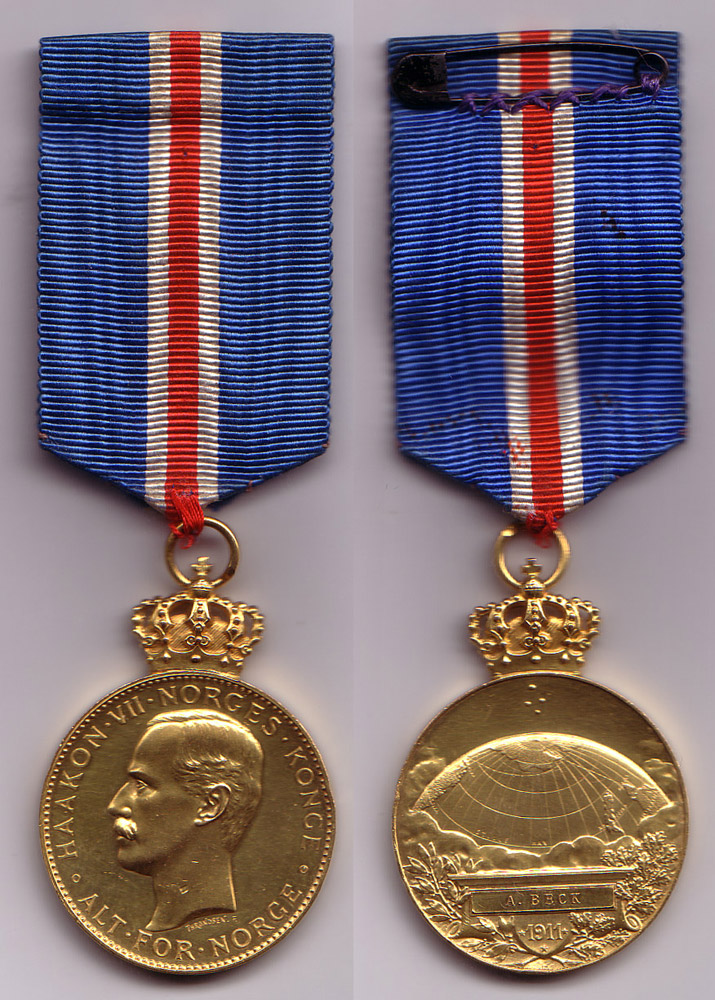
The South Pole Medal, which was awarded to participants in Roald Amundsen's South Pole expedition, was designed by Throndsen. This medal was awarded to Andreas Beck.

Ivar Throndsen (March 29, 1853 – January 18, 1932) was a Norwegian engraver.

Throndsen was born in Nes, Akershus. He became an apprentice to the goldsmith Jacob Tostrup in Christiania (now Oslo) in 1870, and at the same time studied at the Norwegian National Academy of Craft and Art Industry under the sculptor Julius Middelthun. He received a job at the Royal Norwegian Mint in Kongsberg in 1879 and, after finishing his studies, started working there in 1880. He produced nearly 500 medals, tokens, and badges during his career. Throndsen died in Kongsberg. His work was catalogued by Ragnar Støren and Hans Holst in 1937.

== Selected works ==
- H. M. The King's Commemorative Medal
- H. M. The King's Gold Medal
- South Pole Medal
- Norwegian Constitution Day medals, 1884–1920
- 1893 Original Die for the Posthorn Stamp (Roman lettering)
- 1902 Nobel Peace Prize Medal based on a model by the sculptor Gustav Vigeland
