= Andreas Beck =

Andreas Beck may refer to:

- Andreas Beck (explorer) (1864–1914), Norwegian explorer
- Andreas Beck (ski jumper) (born 1976), Austrian ski jumper
- Andreas Beck (tennis) (born 1986), German tennis player
- Andreas Beck (footballer) (born 1987), German football defender
