= South Pole Medal =

South Pole Medal Sydpolsmedaljen
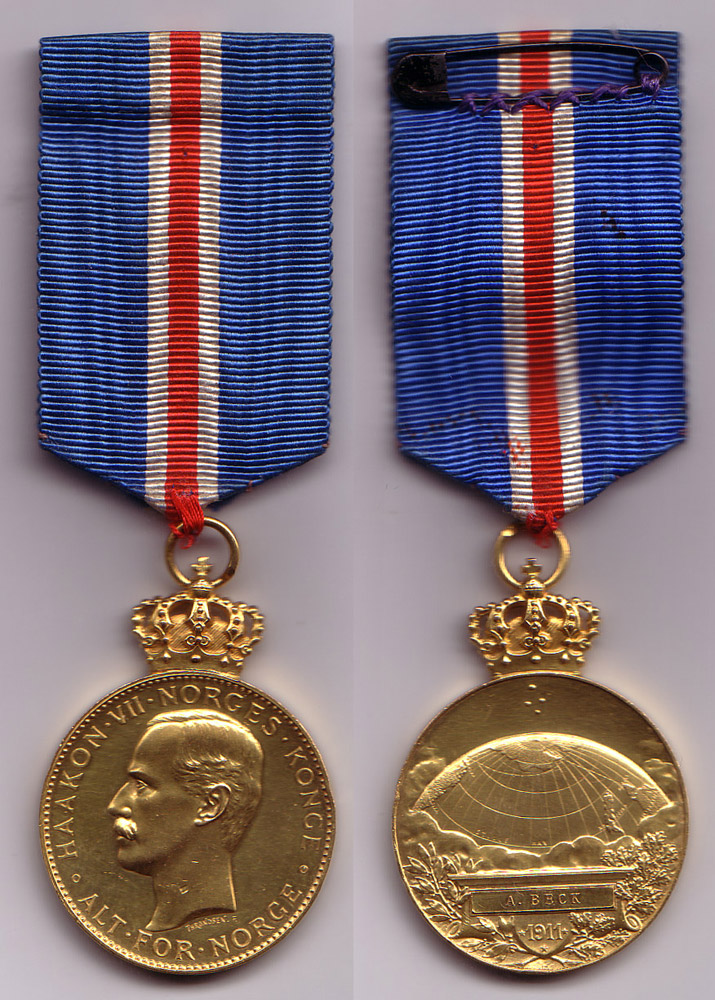
- Country: Norway
- Established: 1912

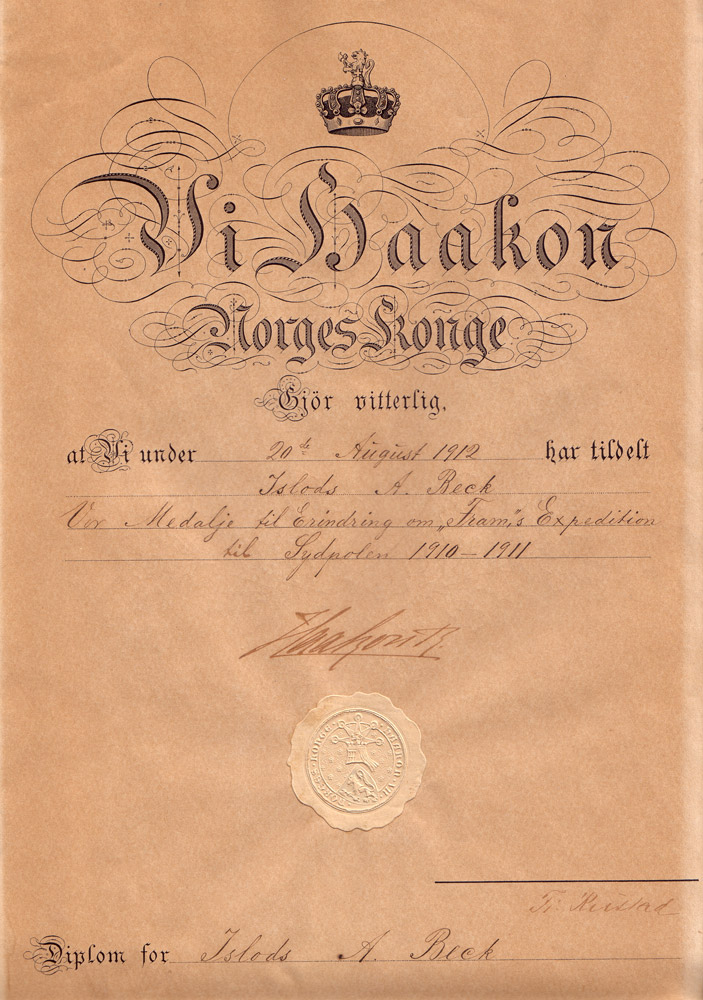
The medal was accompanied by a certificate; this one was awarded to Andreas Beck

The South Pole Medal (Norwegian: Sydpolsmedaljen) or Medal Commemorating the 1910–1911 Fram Expedition to the South Pole (Medalje til erindring om "Frams" ekspedisjon til Sydpolen 1910–1911) is a Norwegian medal established by Haakon VII of Norway on August 20, 1912 to recognize participants in Roald Amundsen's South Pole expedition. The medal was awarded to participants in the exhibition on the day it was instituted. The medal was designed by the engraver Ivar Throndsen.

== Description ==
The South Pole Medal was cast in gold, silver, and bronze, and it was awarded in gold. The obverse depicts King Haakon VII with his name and motto. The obverse is identical to that of the King's Medal of Merit. The reverse depicts the southern hemisphere and the Southern Cross together with a field for the name of the medal recipient and the year 1911. The lower part is framed by crossed oak and laurel branches. The medal is topped by a royal crown. The medal ribbon is dark blue with a red stripe edged in white in the middle.

The medal was accompanied by a certificate whose design was exactly the same as that awarded together with the King's Medal of Merit.

== Recipients ==
The South Pole Medal was awarded to the following people:

- Roald Amundsen
- Andreas Beck
- Olav Bjaaland
- Hjalmar Fredrik Gjertsen
- Ludvig A. Hansen
- Helmer J. Hanssen
- Sverre Hassel
- Hjalmar Johansen
- Halvardus Kristensen
- Alexander Kutschin
- Adolf Lindstrøm
- Thorvald Nilsen
- Jacob Nødtvedt
- Karenius B. Olsen
- Kristian Prestrud
- Martin Rønne
- Jørgen Stubberud
- Knut Sundbeck
- Oscar Wisting
