= Hans Ola Sørlie =

Norwegian actor

Hans Ola Sørlie (30 December 1953 – 29 May 1988) was a Norwegian actor.

Sørlie grew up in Otta and moved to Oslo to study medicine at the University of Oslo. He was discovered as an acting talent and succeeded at joining the Norwegian National Academy of Theatre in 1978. He was hire by the National Theatre in May 1981. However, he continued studying medicine part-time. While playing the main role in They Shoot Horses, Don't They?, he was spotted and was hired to play Jørgen Stubberud in the British ITV production The Last Place on Earth. His screen break-through came with the role of Sverre, one of the main protagonists in Orion's Belt. He played a prominent role in Karachi, which was launched after his death. Sørlie was killed in a traffic accident in Fåvang on 29 May 1988 along with his father, Ivar Sørlie, after their Volvo swerved into the wrong lane and was hit by a truck. At the time of his death, Sørlie had a three-year-old son with his common-law wife, Linn Stokke, who was also pregnant at the time.
