= Amundsen (film) =

2019 Norwegian biopic

- Film poster
- Directed by: Espen Sandberg
- Written by: Ravn Lanesskog
- Produced by: Espen Horn
- Starring: Pål Sverre Hagen; Katherine Waterston; Christian Rubeck
- Cinematography: Pål Ulvik Rokseth
- Edited by: Perry Eriksen, Martin Stoltz
- Music by: Johan Söderqvist
- Release date: 15 February 2019
- Running time: 125 minutes
- Country: Norway
- Language: Norwegian/English

Amundsen is a Norwegian film, released on 15 February 2019, that details the life of Norwegian explorer Roald Amundsen. It was directed by Espen Sandberg and was distributed in Norway by SF Studios.

== Plot ==
Flying in an Arctic storm, elderly Roald Amundsen's plane crashes, stranding him and his companions. Waiting for news while the world assumes he has died, his brother Leon recounts the explorer's life story to Roald's Alaskan lover Bess Magids.

As boys, Roald and Leon are enchanted by the unknown poles on a globe. As young men, they pioneer a route through the Northwest Passage. Despite his accomplishments, other explorers still look down upon Roald for showing respect to Inuit. Robert Falcon Scott briefly congratulates him, but would rather talk with politicians.

The Amundsens decide to join the race to the North Pole, securing funding by promising to prioritise science over speed. News arrives that Frederick Cook has reached the Pole, an unproven claim that nonetheless dismays Roald. He decides to head for the South Pole instead, but keeps the new plan secret. As he sets sail, he reveals the truth to his crew who all support the change, and a letter is delivered to the King declaring he will eventually make good on his promised scientific expedition to the North.

In Antarctica, Amundsen dismisses some of his crew who think his relentless push is reckless. The remainder succeed in reaching the Pole, where they plant a Norwegian flag and leave a courteous note for Scott.

Back in Europe, the English lionise the deceased Scott's heroism while Amundsen is considered an ungentlemanly trickster. He is better received in Norway, but his peaceful new life with lover Kiss Bennett is disrupted when he learns he must keep his promise to sail to the North Pole by drifting on ice.

Three years into the planned five-year mission, Amundsen abandons his crewmates and travels to Alaska. His new passion is to fly to the Pole, a quixotic and expensive undertaking that enrages his brother. Eventually his plane crashes, apparently bringing the narrative full circle.

Amundsen and his copilots build a makeshift runway and manage to return to Norway, to great public acclaim and the relief of Leon and Bess. He refuses to reconcile with Leon, and proposes to Bess. She agrees to marry him only after he reaches the North Pole, which he finally accomplishes on board Umberto Nobile's airship.

He publishes an undiplomatic autobiography that further alienates his supporters. Desperate to salvage his reputation, he sets out to rescue Nobile, whose airship has crashed in a storm. Amundsen's plane crashes and it is revealed this is the crash actually depicted in the opening scene. Knowing that this time Roald must have died, Leon smashes the globe they had admired as children.

== Cast ==
- Pål Sverre Hagen as Roald Amundsen
- Katherine Waterston as Bess Magids
- Christian Rubeck as Leon Amundsen
- Ruby Dagnall as Aline Amundsen
- Trond Espen Seim as Fridtjof Nansen
- Mads Sjøgård Pettersen as Helmer Hanssen
- Jonas Strand Gravli as Leif Dietrichson
- Fridtjov Såheim as Hjalmar Johansen
- Ole Andre Kaada as Oscar Wisting
- Ole Christopher Ertvaag as Hjalmar Riiser-Larsen
- Ted Otis as Lincoln Ellsworth
- Ida Ursin-Holm as Kristine "Kiss" Elisabeth Bennett
- Preben Hodneland as Fredrik Ramm
- Herbert Nordrum as Kristian Prestrud
- Eirik Evjen as Paul Knutsen
- Sondre Larsen as Gennady Olonkin
- Elg Elgesem as Olav Bjaaland
- Torgny Gerhard Aanderaa as Harald Sverdrup
- Geoffrey Kirkness as Charles Bennett
- David Bark-Jones as Robert Falcon Scott
- Adrian Lukis as George Curzon, 1st Marquess Curzon of Kedleston
- Přemysl Bureš as Robert Peary
- Luca Calvani as Umberto Nobile
- Vojtěch Kotek as Karl Feucht
- Kenneth Åkerland Bergas as Sverre Hassel
- Marius Lien as Oskar Omdal
- Endre Hellestveit as Peter Tessem

== Production ==
The film was shot in Norway, Iceland and the Czech Republic. It was released by the Swedish company SF Studios in Norway, who will also distribute it in Sweden, Denmark and Finland.

== Reception ==
Month before the film's release, Variety reported that Amundsen was "expected to be the biggest Norwegian release of 2019". However many "Norwegian critics have panned the film" owing to its breadth of detail and shallow focus. It also received criticism for its apparent similarity to sections of a biography written by Tor Bomann-Larsen.

Bernhard Ellefsen in Morgenbladet believed that "the best thing about the film about Roald Amundsen is that the polar explorer appears as something resembling the arsehole he was".

Birger Vestmo of NRK said that, although it was beautifully filmed, critics believed the characters portrayed in the film were conveyed as too cold and stiff to engage with.
