= Cape Sverre =

Peninsula in Nunavut, Canada

Coordinates: 78.818°N 98.204°W

Cape Sverre is a peninsula in Qikiqtaaluk Region, Nunavut, Canada. Named in honor of Sverre Hassel of the 1900 Otto Sverdrup expedition, it is the northernmost point on Amund Ringnes Island.
