= Jørgen Stubberud =

Norwegian polar explorer (1883–1980)

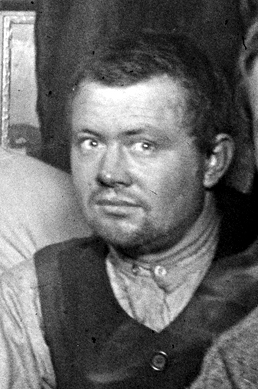
Jørgen Stubberud in 1911

Jørgen Stubberud (17 April 1883 – 12 February 1980) was a Norwegian polar explorer who participated in the Amundsen Antarctica Expedition between 1910 and 1912.

== Biography ==
Stubberud was born at Bekkensten, Svartskog in Oppegård, in Akershus county, Norway. He first met with Roald Amundsen at the latter's home in Svartskog in 1909, when he was employed as a carpenter to repair some old houses. Stubberud obviously did the job well, as Amundsen afterward asked him to construct Framheim in his garden. The task given was: "It should be a winter quarters, five meters long, four meters wide and five meters high. Figure out the rest yourself!"

When the job was done and Amundsen was satisfied with the work, the cabin was dismantled and prepared for shipment with the vessel Fram. Stubberud himself seized the opportunity and asked Amundsen for permission to join the expedition, which was granted. With his wife's blessing he then signed a contract to work for Amundsen the next seven years. Upon arrival in the Antarctic, Framheim was erected and served as the expedition's base.

Lieutenant Kristian Prestrud was given the task of leading a three-man expedition to explore the completely unknown territory of King Edward VII Land to the north and east of Framheim. Along with Kristian Prestrud and Hjalmar Johansen, Jørgen Stubberud surveyed a large area to the north and east of Framheim and provided valuable information and mapping that enhanced the scientific outcomes of Amundsen’s expedition.

Stubberud was assigned to the original group of eight men that made an unsuccessful attempt to reach the Pole on 8 September 1911. Due to extreme temperatures, they were forced to retreat from the depot at 80°, partly without proper organization and placing the lives of two men in danger. This was heavily criticized by Hjalmar Johansen, who had previous experience from his Arctic exploration with Fritjof Nansen. Such opposition was unheard-of and Amundsen then reorganized the Pole party by reducing its number. Years later, Stubberud would only speak well of Amundsen, but agreed that he had not properly managed the dispute with Johansen.

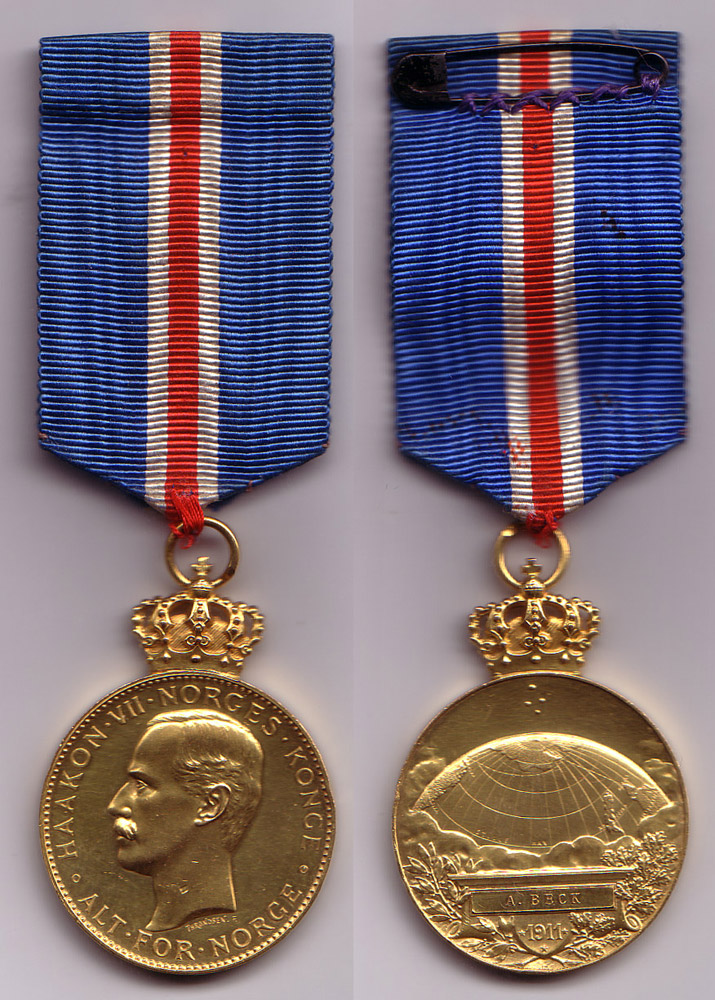
South Pole Medal

For his participation in the expedition, he was awarded the South Pole Medal (Sydpolsmedaljen), the Royal Norwegian award instituted by King Haakon VII in 1912 to reward participants in Roald Amundsen's South Pole expedition. Later in life Stubberud worked as a customs officer and lived at Romsås, Oslo.

== In popular culture ==
Stubberud was portrayed by Hans Ola Sørlie in the 1985 Central Television serial The Last Place on Earth.
