= Geoffrey Kirkness =

- Education: Royal Central School of Speech and Drama
- Occupation: Actor
- Years active: 1973–present

Geoffrey Kirkness is a British stage, television and film actor. He has appeared in BBC television and radio play roles.

== Stage career ==
A student at Fitzwilliam College, Cambridge, Kirkness trained as an actor at the Central School of Speech and Drama, London. In 1974 he played in a touring production of The Wisest Fool by Sir Thomas Overbury.

Kirkness has appeared in the London West End, where he played the leading role Dick Dewy, in Under the Greenwood Tree 1978-79, directed by Patrick Garland at the Vaudeville Theatre. He joined the Royal Shakespeare Company subsequently, for The Irish Play by Ron Hutchinson, appearing as Dwyer.

== Films ==
Kirkness was the TV presenter in Ali G Indahouse, with Sacha Baron Cohen, 2002. He played Colin opposite Toyah Willcox in the film The Power of Three, 2011.

In Amundsen (2019), Kirkness played (name in role Charles Bennet) Charles Peto Bennett (1856–1940), timber merchant and collector, whose Norwegian wife Kristine had an adulterous affair with Roald Amundsen. He had a part in Listen in 2020.

== Television and radio ==
Kirkness played Vice Admiral Phillips in the drama series Dunkirk, for the BBC, 2004 and General Alanbrooke in Into the Storm 2009, with Brendan Gleeson, for HBO television. In 2012 he appeared in the second series of The Hour, as Lord Reeves. In The Crimson Field he played Captain Osberton.

In BBC Radio 4 play aired on 25 March 2023, The Song of the Cossacks based on the repatriation of Cossacks after World War II, and adapted by Stephen Wyatt from a stage play by Jean Binnie, Kirkness played General Skiro.
