= Sverre Hassel =

Norwegian polar explorer (1876–1928)

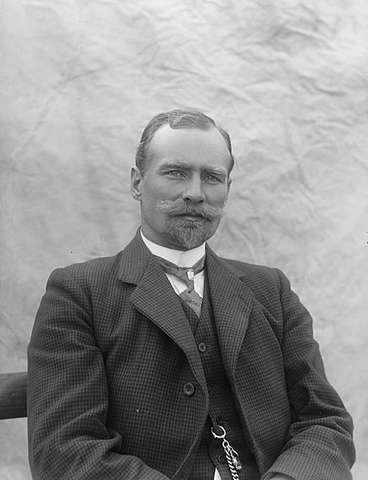
Sverre Helge Hassel

Sverre Helge Hassel (30 July 1876 – 6 June 1928) was a Norwegian polar explorer and one of the first five people to reach the South Pole.

== Biography ==
Sverre Hassel was born in Christiania (now Oslo), Norway. As soon as he was old enough, he went to sea, earning his mate's certificate. Between 1898 and 1902, Hassel participated on board the Fram in Otto Sverdrup's attempt to circumnavigate Greenland.

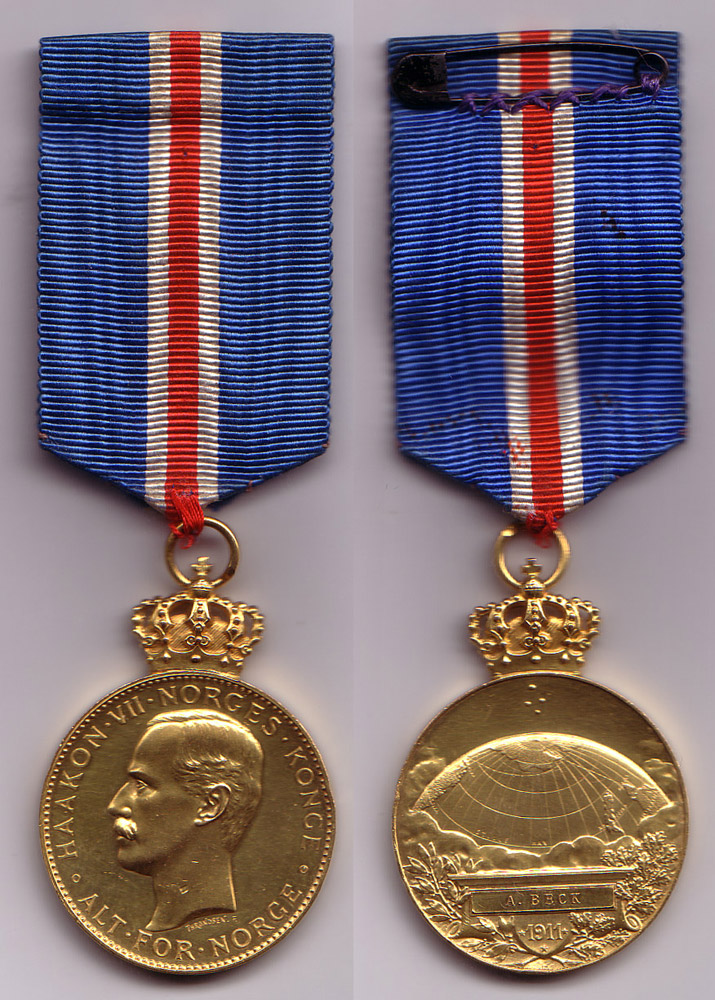
South Pole Medal

Along with Helmer Hanssen, Hassel was picked as an expert dog driver to take part in Roald Amundsen's South Pole expedition 1910–1912. On 14 December 1911, Hassel together with Amundsen, Helmer Hanssen, Olav Bjaaland and Oscar Wisting were the first to reach the South Pole. For his participation in the expedition, he was awarded the South Pole Medal (Sydpolsmedaljen), the Royal Norwegian award instituted by King Haakon VII in 1912 to reward participants in Roald Amundsen's South Pole expedition.

Hassel was constable of the Maritime Military Corps in 1904 before he was hired as an assistant at the customs authorities in Kristiansand. In 1922, Hassel became customs inspector and office manager in Grimstad. Sverre Hassel died in 1928 during a visit to Amundsen's home in Svartskog.

== Legacy ==
- Mount Hassel: peak at the northeasternmost summit of the massif at the head of Amundsen Glacier, in the Queen Maud Mountains in Antarctica.
- Hassel Sound: strait between Amund Ringnes Island and Ellef Ringnes Island in northern Canada
- Cape Sverre: northernmost point on Amund Ringnes Island, which he circumnavigated in 1900
- Hassel was portrayed by Erik Hivju in the 1985 television serial The Last Place on Earth, and by Kenneth Åkerland Bergas in the 2019 film Amundsen.

== Sources ==
Roald Amundsen wrote about the expedition in Sydpolen published in two volumes in 1912–1913. The work was translated from the Norwegian into English by A. G. Chater, and published as The South Pole: An Account of the Norwegian Antarctic Expedition in the "Fram," 1910–1912
