= Hjalmar Johansen =

Norwegian polar explorer (1867–1913)

Fredrik Hjalmar Johansen
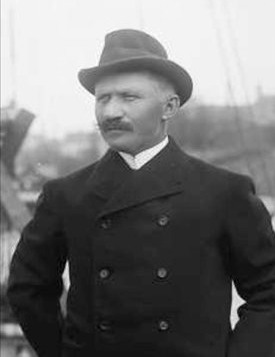
- Born: 15 May 1867; Skien, Norway
- Died: 3 January 1913 (aged 45); Christiania, Norway
- Education: Royal Frederick University
- Occupation: Polar explorer
- Spouse: Hilda Øvrum (1868–1956)

Fredrik Hjalmar Johansen (15 May 1867 – 3 January 1913) was a Norwegian polar explorer. He participated on the first and third Fram expeditions. He shipped out with the Fridtjof Nansen expedition in 1893–1896, and accompanied Nansen to notch a new Farthest North record near the North Pole. Johansen also participated in the expedition of Roald Amundsen to the South Pole in 1910–1912.

== Early life ==
Born at Skien in Telemark county, Norway. He was the son of Jens Johansen (1838–88) and Maren Pedersdatter (1838–1907). He was the second eldest son in a family of five children. He attended Royal Frederick University (now University of Oslo) to study law in Christiania (now Oslo). However, he performed poorly at law school, due to a low attendance of lectures. At the age of 21, Johansen's father died, prompting him to leave law school. After dropping out of school, Hjalmar briefly worked in an office job at Bratsberg. However, by that time he had already made his mark as an athlete; he was an excellent skier and gymnast. In gymnastics he became Norwegian champion in 1885 in Fredrikshald and world champion in 1889 in Paris.

== Exploring expeditions ==
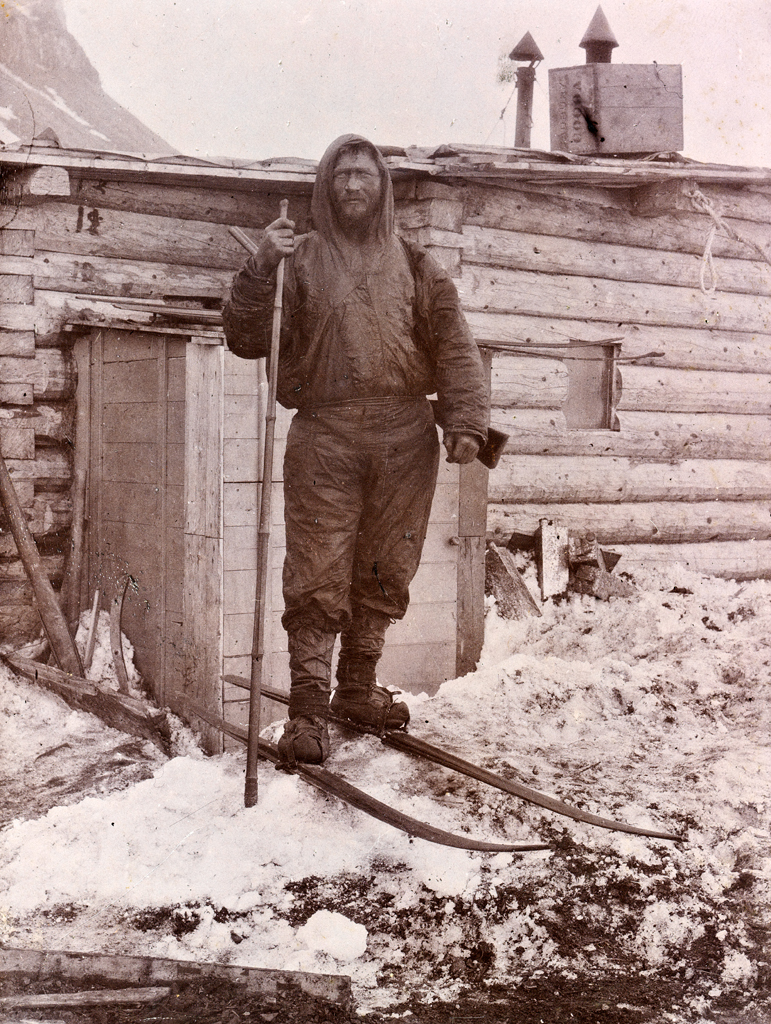
Johansen in 1896

=== Arctic ===
Johansen joined Nansen's polar expedition with Fram in 1893; he had to take the position of stoker, as the others were filled. After Fram froze fast, he became an assistant to Sigurd Scott-Hansen (1868–1937) with his meteorologic studies. Johansen was an expert dog driver. Using skis and sled dogs, Johansen accompanied Nansen on their joint closest approach to the North Pole, 86 degrees 14 minutes north, in 1895. On their way home, Johansen and Nansen were forced to spend the winter on Franz Josef Land because of severe damage to their kayaks when crossing open channels in the ice. During the expedition, Johansen once fell through the ice and was barely saved by Nansen, and also received a blow on his head from a polar bear.

On the return of the Nansen parties to Norway, Johansen and other members of the crew of the Fram were celebrated as heroes. Johansen was promoted to captain in the Norwegian infantry at the garrison in Tromsø. However he drank heavily and in 1907 he was asked to resign his position in the army. Between the years 1907 to 1909, Johansen participated in four expeditions to Svalbard.

=== Antarctica ===
In 1910 he was one of Amundsen's men on the Fram and in Antarctica. Amundsen and his men, racing for the South Pole with Robert Falcon Scott, started out for the South Pole too early in the season and had to return to base camp at the Bay of Whales.

Johansen had disagreed with the early start and had to rescue a less experienced member of the party, Kristian Prestrud, from freezing to death on the return journey. Amundsen had taken the best dogsled and sped off towards the camp without regard for his men as a storm approached. As a result, Prestrud and Johansen had no tent or cooking equipment to melt snow and had no choice but to press on for the camp in a blizzard with extreme windchill (−50 °C) and a dangerous descent towards the base camp.

Johansen had saved Prestrud from death and carried him to the base camp. However, the mishap enraged Amundsen. Upon their return to the Bay of Whales, Johansen quarrelled with Amundsen in front of the other men; Amundsen reacted to the argument by dismissing Johansen from the party heading for the South Pole. He further disciplined Johansen by ordering him to subordinate himself to Prestrud, and ordering the two men to embark on a minor expedition towards King Edward VII Land while the other members of the main expedition resumed their trek towards the Pole.

The Amundsen party successfully reached the South Pole and reunited with the subsidiary party. On the expedition's landfall in Tasmania Amundsen dismissed Johansen from the Fram, paid him off, and ordered him to return separately to Norway. Once Johansen had left Amundsen's party, the triumphant leader made the entire remaining crew sign a paper that stated that they were to keep quiet about the whole expedition. Amundsen was to have the sole right of writing about it in his soon-to-be-published book. After returning separately to Norway, Johansen found that he was never to be credited by Amundsen for any contribution to the expedition, including his heroic rescue of Prestrud.

Johansen was awarded the South Pole Medal (Sydpolsmedaljen). He resumed drinking alcohol, became clinically depressed and in 1913 committed suicide. His wife Hilda Øvrum (1868–1956) and their four children survived him.

== Legacy ==
After his death, Johansen's reputation largely drifted into obscurity. In 1997, however, biographer Ragnar Kvam, Jr. published a biography of the forgotten explorer, Den tredje mann: Beretningen om Hjalmar Johansen. As a result of this and other work, Johansen's place in the story of Norwegian polar exploration is being rehabilitated.

In 2005, the International Hydrographic Organization officially approved the proposal by American arctic scientist Jonathan E. Snow to name Hjalmar Johansen Seamount, a newly discovered volcanic edifice on the floor of the Arctic Ocean northwest of Svalbard. The location is 82 degrees, 57 minutes N, 3 degrees, 40 minutes W. The top of the undersea mountain lies at a water depth of 1075 metres.

Johansen was portrayed by Knut Ørvig in the 1968 film Bare et liv – historien om Fridtjof Nansen, by Toralv Maurstad in the 1985 miniseries The Last Place on Earth, and by Fridtjov Såheim in the 2019 film Amundsen.

== Other sources ==
- Hjalmar Johansen (1899) With Nansen in the North (Ward, Lock and Co Limited, London)
- Ragnar Kvam (1997) Den tredje mann: Beretningen om Hjalmar Johansen (Oslo: Gyldendal) ISBN 978-8205248847
