= Roald Amundsen's South Pole Journey =

- Roald Amundsens sydpolsferd
- Directed by: Roald Amundsen
- Written by: Roald Amundsen
- Produced by: Roald Amundsen
- Release date: 1912
- Running time: 16:35
- Country: Norway
- Language: Norwegian

Roald Amundsen's South Pole Journey (Norwegian: Roald Amundsens sydpolsferd) is a Norwegian documentary film that features Roald Amundsen's original footage from his South Pole expedition from 1910 to 1912. The film was seen for the first time in 1912 and it was used by Amundsen for his traveling lectures.

The film was added to UNESCO's Memory of the World international register in 2005 and is one of the few films to be listed in it. The film has been restored by the Norwegian Film Institute and its music has been re-recorded.
