= Framheim =

Framheim Station
- Antarctic base
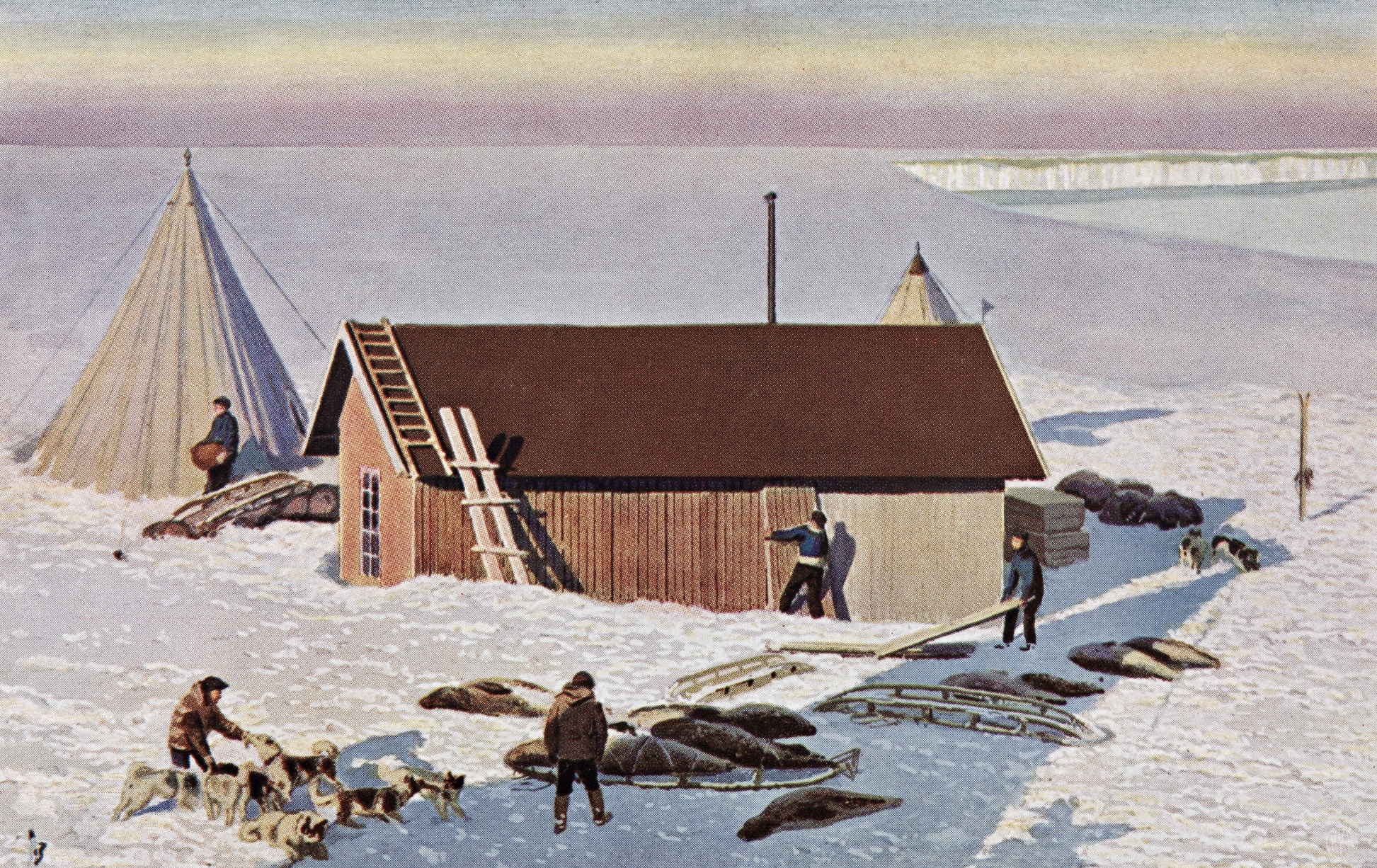
- Framheim in January 1911 (by Andreas Bloch)

- Location of Framheim Station in Antarctica
- Coordinates: 78°30′S 164°00′W
- Country: Norway
- Location in Antarctica: Bay of Whales; Ross Ice Shelf
- Established: January 1911
- Closed: February 1912

Framheim was the name of explorer Roald Amundsen's base at the Bay of Whales on the Ross Ice Shelf in Antarctica during his successful quest for the South Pole. It was used between January 1911 and February 1912.

== Cabin and tents ==
The hut was constructed in sections by a master carpenter, Jørgen Stubberud and erected at Amundsen's home in Norway, then dismantled for shipment to Antarctica on the Fram. Framheim literally means "home of the Fram". During its construction in Norway, Amundsen maintained that the hut was for "observation", which would fit in nicely with his supposed intent to head to the North Pole. To the more than casual student of exploration, it was obvious that the hut was intended as living quarters. Amundsen was headed to the South Pole.

The cabin was an early example of a pre-fabricated structure, and employed a custom dining table which could retract to the ceiling for cleaning beneath. It measured eight by four meters, and the walls were made up of four layers of three one inch wood lumber with cardboard between for insulation.

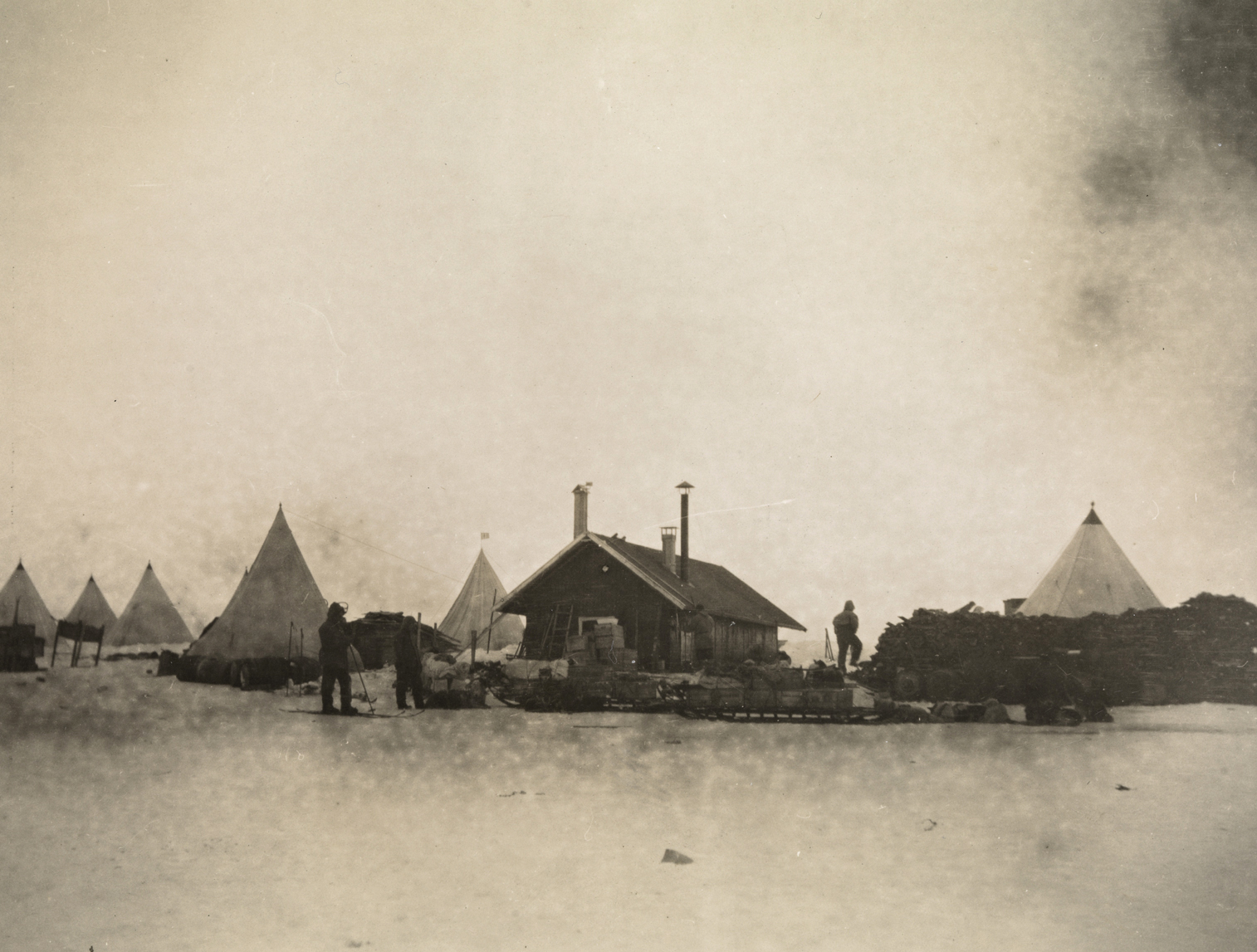
Framheim with tent, dogsled and equipment.

During the long Antarctic winter, Amundsen and the members of his expedition constructed a network of workshops and storage rooms, including a steam-bath room, carved out of the ice surrounding the main hut. In this complex the men busied themselves in preparing for the upcoming journey to the South Pole.

Amundsen spurned the traditional white tent, and instead dyed his tent material black. He stated that this was to serve three purposes: First, black would absorb what little solar radiation would fall upon the tent. Second, a black tent would provide the best possible contrast against the endless snow and ice if one became lost. And finally, the black provided a rest for the eyes. In addition, the square, pyramid-style tent was equipped with a single central pole that was lashed to one of the sledges in its full length during travel, avoiding the need to assemble tent-poles and making the job of pitching the tent very simple and quick. The tent also featured a sewn-in floor, which was an innovation several years ahead of its time.

== Equipment ==
At Framheim, Amundsen continually upgraded his equipment, since he was largely dissatisfied with standard polar gear. The sledges were refined by shaving down portions of their frames and runners, achieving a 60% weight reduction without compromising their overall strength.

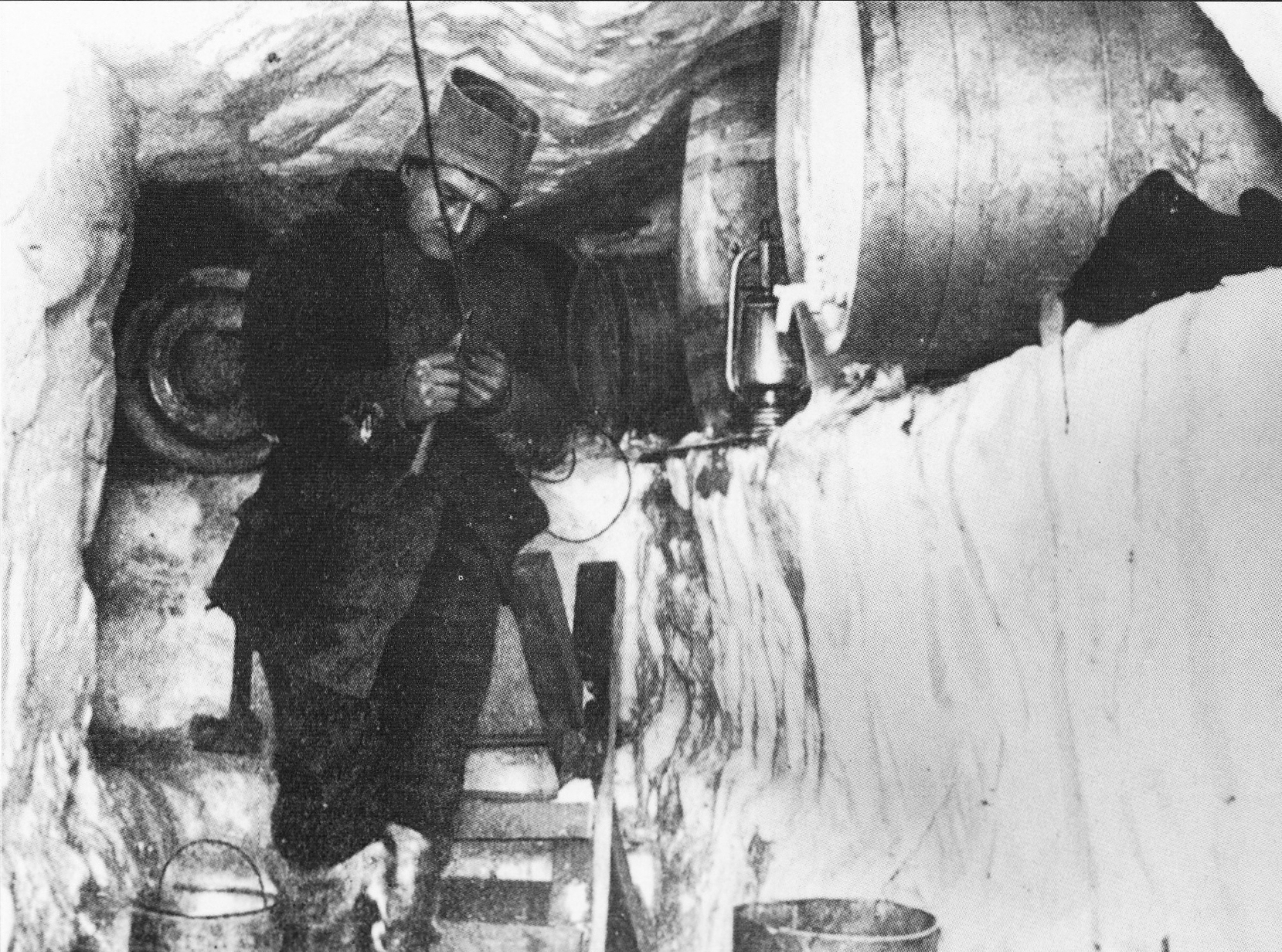
Interior of the fuel depot at Framheim

Amundsen designed special sledge-cases for food and equipment that remained permanently lashed to the sledges, with access through a lid that could easily be pried off without the need to remove mitts. This saved the time of unloading and re-loading packing boxes when making and breaking camp while on the march, and also eliminated the risk of frostbite when unpacking the sledges. The sledge-cases were also refined during the winter by planing down the wood to reduce their weight. Further, food selection and packing had been refined for both efficiency and maximum space usage. Amundsen brought only four foods: pemmican (made according to his own recipe), chocolate, milk powder and biscuits, although this diet was supplemented by seal and penguin meat stored in the supply depots on the Barrier, and by fresh dog-meat from the dogs that they culled during the journey. This fresh, vitamin-rich meat in their diet prevented the onset of scurvy.

To prepare for the trip to the pole, the ski bindings were fitted with hooks so they could be removed during sleeping hours and hung inside the tent. Since the bindings were made of leather, the ravenous sledge dogs would often gnaw at them when the men were asleep. Footwear and the risk of frostbite was a major concern for Amundsen, especially after some negative experiences during the autumn depot-laying trips and the abortive first attempt to reach the Pole. He and his men re-constructed and refined their ski-boots several times before the final polar journey, to obtain maximum insulation against the cold and to provide the necessary flexibility for skiing. Each man brought spare boots in case of breakage or malfunction, with the risk of debilitating frostbite outweighing the issue of weight. None of Amundsen's men experienced frostbitten feet during the polar journey, despite the extreme temperatures.

== Fate of the base ==
The Polar Party returned to Framheim on 25 January 1912 and left in the Fram on 30 January after "two days of bustle in getting on board the things we were (to) take with us". They left behind the buried hut "that strong little house that now lay entirely hidden beneath the snow behind Mount Nelson" and doubtless many artefacts. The site on the eastern flank of the Bay of Whales was used extensively in the 1930s by a series of American expeditions led by Richard E. Byrd. They established bases somewhat to the north of Framheim - Little America I to III. There is, however, apparently no definite evidence that the original Framheim hut was rediscovered, possibly because it was deeply buried. Sometime between 1957 and 1962 calving of the Ross Ice Shelf resulted in the block on which Framheim and the Little America bases were sited being detached from the barrier ice. The floe then probably drifted west and progressively broke up along the edge of the Ross Barrier.

== See also ==
- Scott's Hut
- Polheim
- List of Antarctic research stations
- List of Antarctic field camps
