= Oscar Wisting =

Norwegian Naval officer and polar explorer (1861–1936)

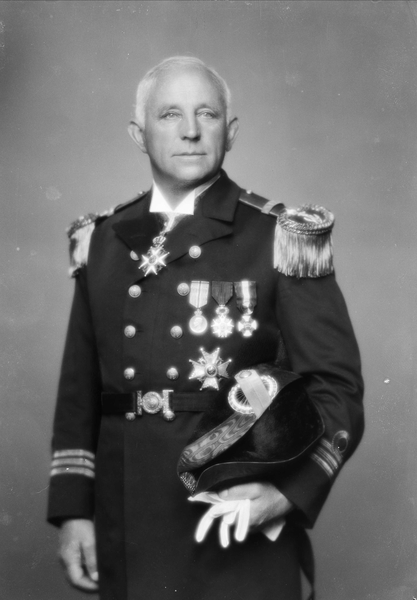
Oscar Adolf Wisting c. 1930

Oscar Adolf Wisting (6 June 1871 – 5 December 1936) was a Norwegian Naval officer and polar explorer. Together with Roald Amundsen he was the first person to reach both the North and South Poles.

== Biography ==
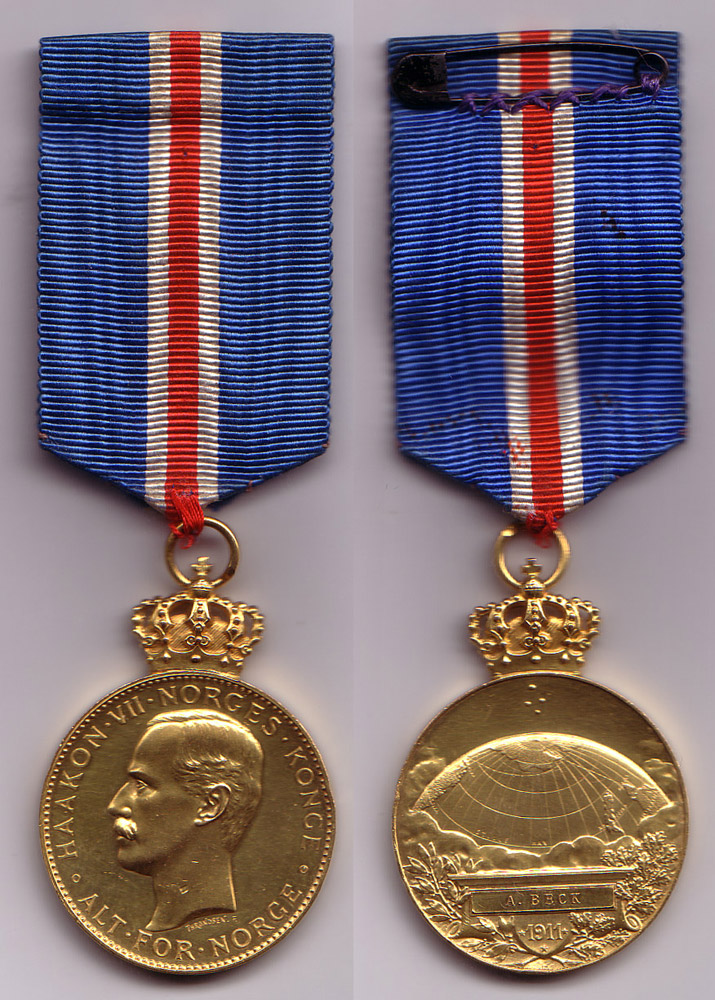
South Pole Medal

Oscar Wisting was born in Larvik, in Vestfold county, Norway. He was the son of Ola Martin Olsen Wisting (1843–1927) and Abigael Helene Andersen (1843–85). He became the eldest of 13 children. His father ran a trucking business. At the age of sixteen, he went to sea and in 1892 joined the Royal Norwegian Navy.

He was working as a naval gunner at Karljohansvern, the naval base in Horten during 1909 when Roald Amundsen asked him to go north with him on his forthcoming North Pole expedition. Amundsen later secretly changed his plans. Wisting went to sea believing they were heading for the North Pole. Instead he learned that they were going south to pick up the race with Robert Falcon Scott to the South Pole.

As a participant in Amundsen's South Pole expedition, on 14 December 1911 along with Amundsen, Helmer Hanssen, Olav Bjaaland and Sverre Hassel, Wisting planted the Norwegian flag on the Geographic South Pole, the first explorers to have reached that point. From 1918 to 1925 Wisting was chief officer on board the Maud in Roald Amundsen's attempt to traverse the Northeast passage. From 1923 to 1925 Wisting more or less acted as leader of the expedition after Amundsen left to try to fly to the pole instead.

In 1926 Wisting participated in Amundsen's successful attempt to fly over the North Pole. In the airship Norge they reached the pole on 12 May 1926. The three previous claims to have arrived at the North Pole—by Frederick Cook in 1908, Robert Peary in 1909, and Richard E. Byrd in 1926 —are all disputed, as being either of dubious accuracy or outright fraud. Some of those disputing these earlier claims therefore consider the crew of the Norge to be the first verified explorers to have reached the North Pole. In addition Wisting, along with Amundsen, was one of the two first persons who had been to both the North Pole and the South Pole.

In later years Oscar Wisting was an active force behind the preparations and building of the Fram Museum in Oslo, a museum built to store and display the polar ship Fram. On 5 December 1936 Wisting was found dead from a heart attack in his old bunk on board the Fram, a few days before the 25th anniversary of the successful South Pole expedition.

For his participation in the expedition, he was awarded the South Pole Medal (Sydpolsmedaljen), the Royal Norwegian award instituted by King Haakon VII in 1912 to reward participants in Roald Amundsen's South Pole expedition.

== Sources ==
Oscar Wisting wrote about his experiences with Roald Amundsen in 16 år med Roald Amundsen (Oslo: Glydendal Norsk Forlag, 1930). Roald Amundsen wrote about the expedition in Sydpolen published in two volumes in 1912–1913. The work was translated into English by A. G. Chater, and published as The South Pole: An Account of the Norwegian Antarctic Expedition in the "Fram" 1910–1912.

== Legacy ==
- Mount Wisting – the northwesternmost summit of the massif at the head of Amundsen Glacier in the Queen Maud Mountains.
- Wisting was portrayed by Ivar Nørve in the 1985 television serial The Last Place on Earth, and by Ole Andre Kaada in the 2019 film Amundsen.

== Other sources ==
- Hansen, Jan Ingar (2001) Oscar Wisting: Amundsens betrodde mann (Schibsted Forlag) ISBN 978-82-516-1867-0
