= The Last Place on Earth =

- Genre: Drama
- Written by: Trevor Griffiths
- Directed by: Ferdinand Fairfax
- Starring: Martin Shaw; Sverre Anker Ousdal; Stephen Moore; Ståle Bjørnhaug; Max von Sydow
- Theme music composer: Trevor Jones
- Country of origin: United Kingdom
- Original languages: English, Norwegian
- No. of seasons: 1
- No. of episodes: 7

Production
- Producer: Tim van Rellim
- Running time: 1x90 minutes, 6x50 minutes

Original release
- Network: Central Independent Television; ITV
- Release: 18 February – 27 March 1985

The Last Place on Earth is a 1985 Central Television seven-part serial, written by Trevor Griffiths based on the book Scott and Amundsen by Roland Huntford. The book is an exploration of the expeditions of Captain Robert F. Scott (played by Martin Shaw) and his Norwegian rival in polar exploration, Roald Amundsen (played by Sverre Anker Ousdal) in their attempts to reach the South Pole.

The series ran for seven episodes and starred a wide range of UK and Norwegian character actors as well as featuring some famous names, such as Max von Sydow, Alexander Knox, Richard Wilson, Sylvester McCoy, Brian Dennehy, and Pat Roach. It also featured performances early in their careers by Bill Nighy and Hugh Grant.

Subsequently, Huntford's book was republished under the same name. The book put forth the point of view that Amundsen's success in reaching the South Pole was abetted by much superior planning, whereas errors by Scott (notably including the reliance on man-hauling instead of sled dogs) ultimately resulted in the death of him and his companions.

== Episodes ==
Episode 1: "Poles Apart"

Episode 2: "Minor Diversion"

Episode 3: "Leading Men"

Episode 4: "Gentlemen and Players"

Episode 5: "The Glories of the Race"

Episode 6: "Foregone Conclusion"

Episode 7: "Rejoice"

== Production ==
A great number of the scenes showing both the Norwegian and British parties on the Antarctic Continent could not be replicated except in very few places. For the series, all production was located at Frobisher Bay on Baffin Island which in and of itself, due to the remoteness and frigid temperatures, subjected both cast and crew to conditions not too different from the actual expeditions in 1912.

== Cast ==
- Martin Shaw – Captain R. F. Scott
- Sverre Anker Ousdal – Roald Amundsen
- Max von Sydow – Fridtjof Nansen
- Brian Dennehy – Frederick Cook
- Alexander Knox – Sir Clements Markham
- Stephen Moore – Dr. "Uncle Bill" Wilson
- Ståle Bjørnhaug – Olav Bjaaland
- Michael Maloney – Lieutenant "Teddy" Evans
- Richard Morant – Captain "Titus" Oates
- Sylvester McCoy – Lieutenant "Birdie" Bowers
- Robin Soans – Dr. "Atch" Atkinson
- Jan Hårstad – Helmer Hanssen
- Erik Hivju – Sverre Hassel
- Jon Eikemo – Adolf Lindstrøm
- Ivar Nørve – Oscar Wisting
- Hans Ola Sørlie – Jørgen Stubberud
- Nils Ole Oftebro – Thorvald Nilsen
- Bjørn Skagestad – Kristian Prestrud
- Sven Nordin – Tryggve Gran
- Pat Roach – Edgar Evans
- Susan Wooldridge – Kathleen Scott, née Bruce
- Bill Nighy – Cecil Meares
- Toralv Maurstad – Hjalmar Johansen
- Per Theodor Haugen – Leon Amundsen
- Tom Georgeson – Chief Stoker "Bill" Lashly
- Hugh Grant – Apsley Cherry-Garrard
- Daragh O'Malley – Tom Crean
- James Aubrey – Sir Ernest Shackleton
