= Håkon Anton Fagerås =

Norwegian sculptor

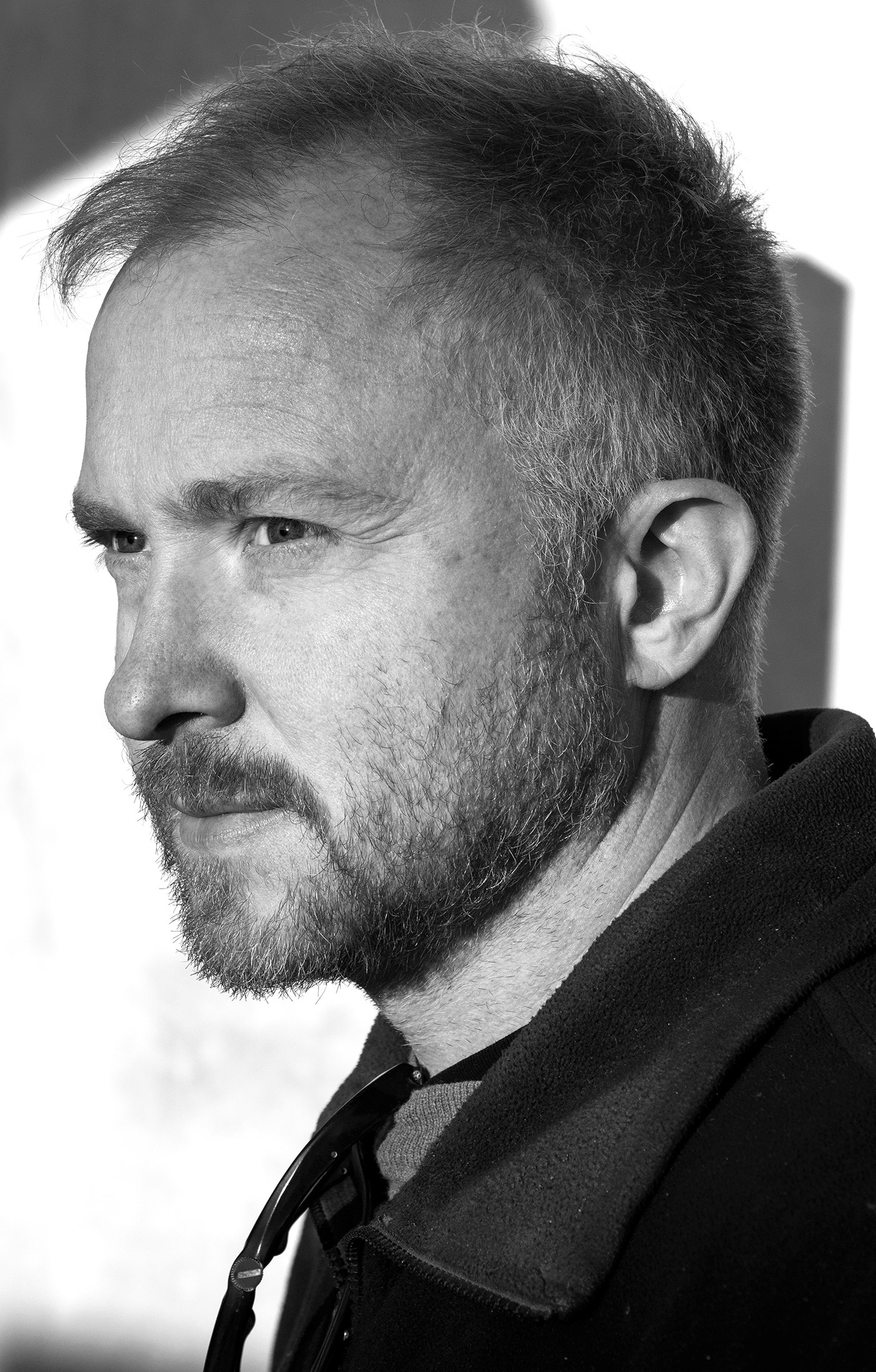
Håkon Anton Fagerås

Håkon Anton Fagerås (born 17 July 1975) is a Norwegian sculptor. He works within the figurative tradition, and is one of a relatively small set of sculptors working in marble.

== Background ==
Håkon Anton Fagerås was born in Drøbak and spent his early years in Bø Municipality. From 1995 to 1996 he was apprenticed to the painter Jan Valentin Sæther, subsequent to which he received his education at the Norwegian National Academy of Craft and Art Industry (1996-1997) as well as the Norwegian National Academy of Fine Arts (1997-2001). Since 1999 he has been operating out of the workshop of stonemason Marco Giannoni in Pietrasanta.

== Work ==
In 2011 Fagerås' monument to Norwegian polar explorer Roald Amundsen and his first expedition to reach the South Pole, titled 90 grader syd ("90 degrees south"), was unveiled at Bygdøy by King Harald V of Norway. Simultaneously, a bust of Amundsen carved from ice was unveiled at the South Pole by then prime minister of Norway Jens Stoltenberg.

Fagerås has designed three coin faces for Norges Bank, the central bank of Norway. In 2012, he designed a silver coin to the value of 200 Norwegian kroner in celebration of the joint 75th birthdays of the king and queen of Norway; in 2019 a 20 kroner circulating coin celebrating the 150th anniversary of the birth of sculptor Gustav Vigeland; and in 2021 a 20 kroner circulating coin celebrating the 250th anniversary of Lutheran minister Hans Nielsen Hauge.

== Decorations, procurements and art assignments (in selection) ==
- 2021 KODE Kunstmuseum, Art museum assignment
- 2021 Olav Bjaaland, bronze sculpture, Morgedal, Procurement
- 2017 Adolf Henrik Lindstrøm, bronze sculpture, Hammerfest, Procurement
- 2012 Henrik Ibsen, marble sculpture for Ibsenmuseet, Oslo, Procurement
- 2011 Henrik Ibsen, two bronze busts, Parco Ibsen, Sorrento, Italy og Skien kommune, Procurement
- 2011 90 grader syd, monument in bronze, Bygdøynes, Oslo, Procurement
- 2006 Peace monument, bronze, Narvik, Procurement

== Solo exhibitions (In selection) ==
- 2021 Galleri Haaken, Oslo
- 2017 Nordnorsk Kunstmuseum, Tromsø
- 2016 Vigelandmuseet, Oslo
- 2010 Kunstnerforbundet, Oslo
- 2006 Blomqvist, Oslo
