= The South Pole: An Account of the Norwegian Antarctic Expedition in the Fram, 1910–12 =

1912 book by Roald Amundsen

The South Pole
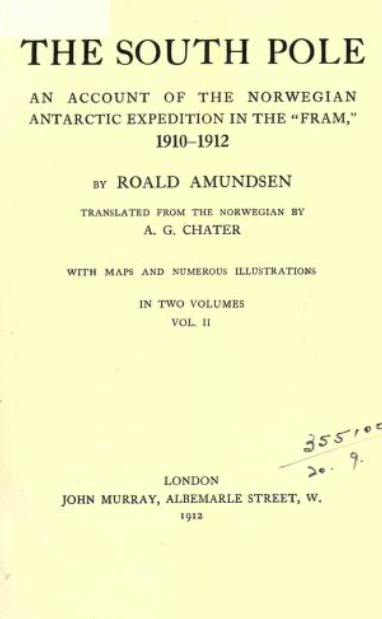
- Title page for The South Pole: An Account of the Norwegian Antarctic Expedition in the Fram, 1910–12 (1912)
- Author: Roald Amundsen
- Original title: Sydpolen
- Translator: A. G. Chater
- Language: Norwegian
- Publisher: Jacob Dybwads forlag
- Publication date: 1912
- Publication place: Norway
- English publication date: 1912
- Pages: 952

The South Pole: An Account of the Norwegian Antarctic Expedition in the Fram, 1910–12 (Norwegian: Sydpolen. Den norske sydpolsfærd med Fram 1910–1912) is a 1912 book by the Norwegian explorer Roald Amundsen. It is an account of Amundsen's South Pole expedition in the ship Fram, which was the first to reach the Geographic South Pole. Amundsen wrote a book about each of his five expeditions, of which the South Pole expedition was the third.

The book was published in two volumes in Norwegian by Jacob Dybwads forlag in 1912. An English translation by A. G. Chater was published by John Murray in the United Kingdom in 1912 and Lee Keedick in the United States in 1913.
