= Olav Bjaaland =

Norwegian polar explorer (1873–1961)

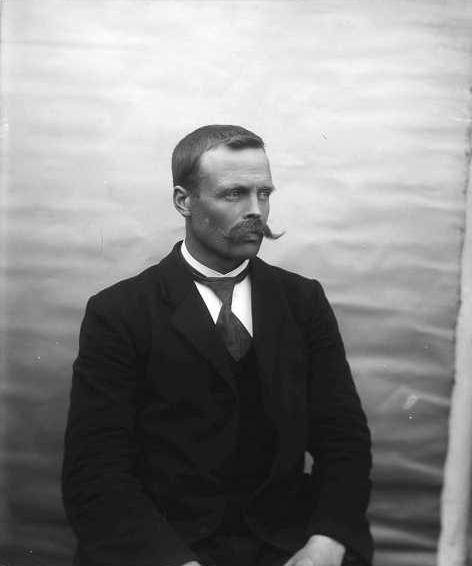
- Born: 5 March 1873; Morgedal, Telemark, Norway
- Died: 8 June 1961 (aged 88); Sauherad, Norway
- Occupation: Ski Champion

Olav Bjaaland (5 March 1873 – 8 June 1961) was a Norwegian ski champion and polar explorer. In 1911, he was one of the first five men to reach the South Pole as part of Amundsen's South Pole expedition.

== Biography ==
Olav Olavsen Bjaaland was born on the Søndre Bjaaland farm at Morgedal in Telemark, Norway. At the turn of the century, Bjaaland, together with the Hemmestveit brothers were among the best skiers in Norway. In 1902, he won the Nordic combined at the Holmenkollen Ski Festival, to this day the classic event in Nordic skiing. In 1909 Bjaaland, together with five others were invited to France to compete with the best skiers of Europe.

On this trip, Bjaaland by chance met Roald Amundsen. The already successful explorer invited Bjaaland to join his forthcoming expedition to the North Pole. Bjaaland was thrilled, and still believing that they were heading to the North Pole. However, they left Oslo, Norway on 7 June 1910 heading south to race for the Antarctic pole against Robert Falcon Scott.

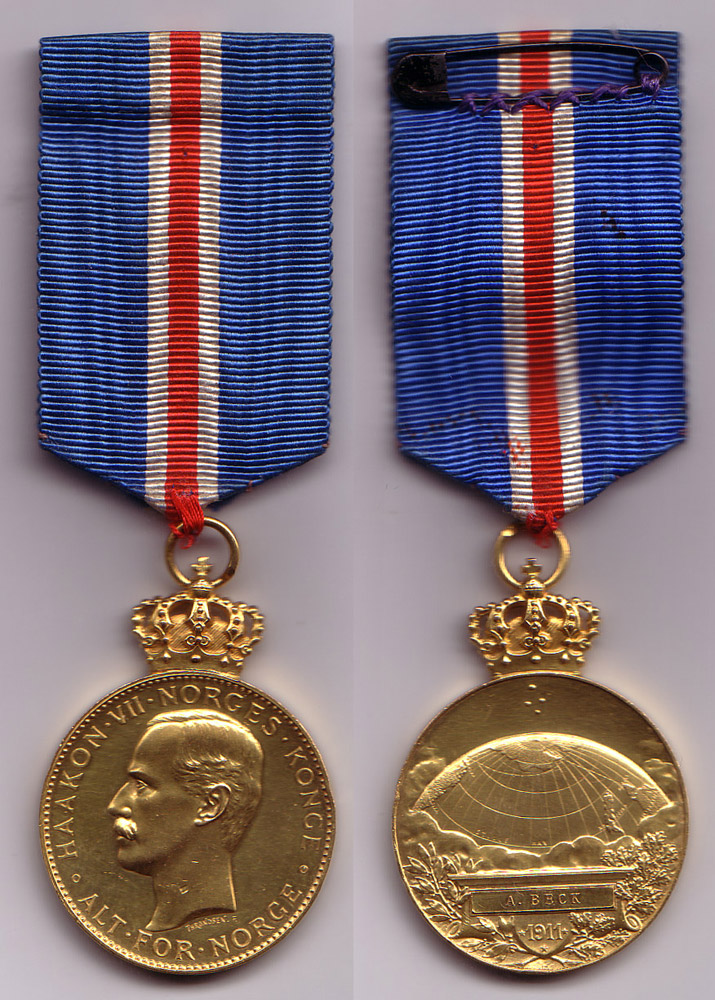
South Pole Medal

Bjaaland was a skilled carpenter, and on the trip he managed to reduce the prefabricated sledges bought in Oslo (Scott had bought the same type of sledges for his expedition, although never modified them) from 88 kg to 22 kg, without reducing their strength notably. On the actual sledge journey from the Bay of Whales to the pole and return, Bjaaland was often used as a forerunner so that the dogs had something to run after. He was known for being able to ski such that the traces he made formed almost perfect straight lines in the terrain. After returning from the successful conquest of the pole, Amundsen asked Bjaaland to go north with him to explore the Northeast Passage, but he turned down the offer.

In later years Bjaaland went back to Telemark and set up a successful ski manufacturing workshop with money lent from Amundsen. In 1961, Bjaaland died peacefully at age 88; of the five to reach the South Pole, he lived the longest, and was the only one to witness the advances made by the IGY in Antarctica, including the construction of the permanent South Pole base named Amundsen–Scott in honor of his expedition leader.

The Bjaaland Museum in Telemark, Norway has a small collection of photographs and other memorabilia from the South Pole expedition.

== Awards ==
- In 1912, he was awarded the South Pole Medal (Sydpolsmedaljen), a Royal Norwegian award instituted by King Haakon VII in 1912 to reward participants in Roald Amundsen's South Pole expedition.
- In 1912, Bjaaland was awarded the Holmenkollen medal (Holmenkollmedaljen), the Norwegian highest competitive award for skiing.
- In 1952, at Morgedal, Bjaaland lit the torch for the 1952 Winter Olympics.
- In 2021, Håkon Anton Fagerås created a statue in bronze of Bjaaland commissioned by the Fram museum in Oslo in honor of Bjaaland.

== In popular culture ==
Bjaaland was portrayed by Ståle Bjørnhaug in the 1985 television serial The Last Place on Earth, and by Elg Elgesem in the 2019 film Amundsen.

== See also ==
- Mount Bjaaland
