= Helmer Hanssen =

Norwegian sailor, pilot and polar explorer (1870–1956)

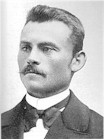
- Born: Helmer Julius Hanssen; 24 September 1870; Bjørnskinn, Nordland, Norway
- Died: 2 August 1956 (aged 85); Tromsø, Troms, Norway
- Occupations: Seal hunter, ice pilot, polar explorer and captain

Helmer Julius Hanssen (24 September 1870 – 2 August 1956) was a Norwegian sailor, pilot and polar explorer. He participated in three of the polar expeditions led by Roald Amundsen and was one of the first five explorers to reach the South Pole.

== Background ==
Helmer Hanssen was born in Bjørnskinn, on the island of Andøya in Nordland, Norway. He was an experienced ice pilot, a skill he had learned while hunting around Spitsbergen. Between 1894 and 1897, he hunted small whales and seals in the Arctic Sea. He later sailed for the Norwegian shipping company, Vesteraalens Dampskibsselskab.

== Career ==
From 1903 to 1905 Helmer Hanssen participated in Roald Amundsen's successful search for the Northwest Passage, as second mate on board the ship Gjøa. On the expedition he learned from the Inuit how to drive sled dogs. In 1910 he headed south with Amundsen to conquer the South Pole, this time as an expert dog driver. He was also in charge of navigation, carrying the master compass on his sledge.

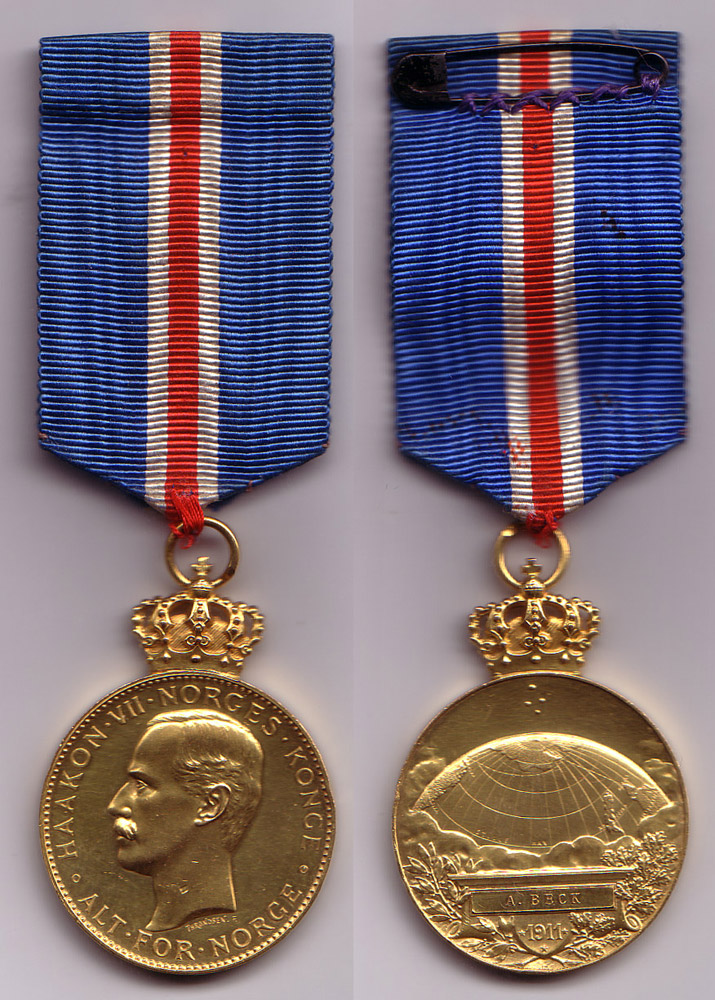
South Pole Medal

He was one of the first five people to reach the South Pole on 14 December 1911, along with Roald Amundsen, Olav Bjaaland, Oscar Wisting, and Sverre Hassel. During their stay at the South Pole, it is estimated that Hanssen passed within 200 yards (180 meters) of the mathematical South Pole point. This was during one of his ski runs which Amundsen had ordered be performed to completely encircle or "box" the pole, to ensure that there was no doubt that the expedition had attained the pole. For his participation in the expedition, he was awarded the South Pole Medal (Sydpolsmedaljen), the Royal Norwegian award instituted by King Haakon VII in 1912 to reward participants in Roald Amundsen's South Pole expedition.

In 1919 he once again went north, this time as captain on Maud in Roald Amundsen's Northeast Passage expedition. Helmer Hanssen was awarded the Knight of St. Olav for exceptional seamanship on Roald Amundsen's expeditions in the northern and southern parts of the world. In 1936 Hanssen published his autobiography The Voyages of a Modern Viking, (London: G. Routledge & Sons Limited, 1936).

== Legacy ==
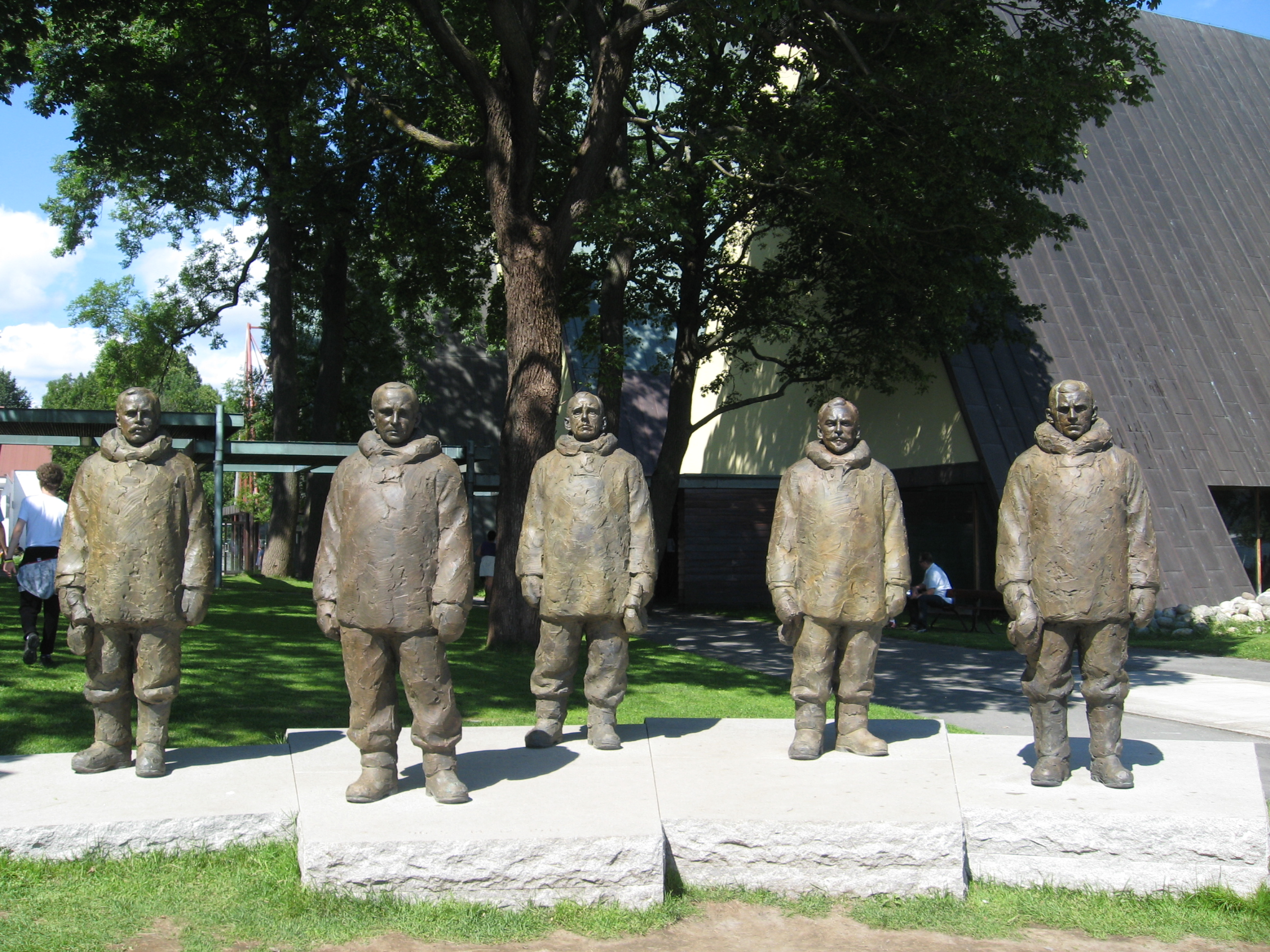
Roald Amundsen's Antarctic explorer team at the Fram Museum

A statue of Helmer Hanssen together with the rest of Roald Amundsen's Antarctic explorer team is located at the Fram Museum at Bygdøy in Oslo, Norway. A scientific research vessel, the FF Helmer Hanssen, has also been named in his honour.

Hanssen was portrayed by Jan Hårstad in the 1985 television serial The Last Place on Earth, and by Mads Sjøgård Pettersen in the 2019 film Amundsen.

== Other sources ==
- Michalsen, Bård Borch (2011) Polarhelten Helmer Hanssen : den trofaste toer (God strek) ISBN 978-82-91984-15-5
