= Homewood =

Homewood may refer to:

== Places ==
=== Canada ===
- Homewood, Manitoba

=== United States ===
- Homewood, Alabama
- Homewood, California
- Homewood, Illinois
- Homewood, Kansas
- Homewood, Pennsylvania
- Homewood (Pittsburgh), three neighborhoods of Pittsburgh, Pennsylvania
- Homewood, South Carolina
- Homewood, West Virginia

== Other uses ==
- Homewood (surname)
- Homewood (Ellicott City, Maryland), U.S., a historic house
- Homewood, Knebworth, a country house in Hertfordshire, England
- The Homewood, a modernist house in Surrey, England
- Homewood, Norway, a property in Bærum, Norway
- Homewood Campus of Johns Hopkins University, the main campus of The Johns Hopkins University since 1914, in northern Baltimore, Maryland, U.S.A., also referring to the surrounding neighborhood
- Homewood Cemetery near Pittsburgh, Pennsylvania
- Homewood Museum, a former estate of Charles Carroll of Homewood
- Homewood Memorial Gardens near Chicago
- Homewood Mountain Resort, a ski area in Lake Tahoe, Nevada
- Homewood National Historic Site, a National Historic Site of Canada in Maitland, Ontario
- Homewood Suites by Hilton, a chain of hotels
- Homewood Plantation (Natchez, Mississippi), an antebellum plantation near Natchez, Mississippi
- Homewood (typeface) a type face cut by Baltimore Type Foundry
