= Kleybolte Peninsula =

Peninsula in Nunavut, Canada

Coordinates: 81.752°N 91.000°W

Kleybolte Peninsula is a heavily glaciated peninsula in northwestern Ellesmere Island in the Qikiqtaaluk Region of Nunavut, Canada. It juts into the Arctic Ocean. During Otto Sverdrup's expedition of 1899–1902, the peninsula was the northernmost point achieved.
