= Homewood, Norway =

Property in Bærum, Norway

Coordinates: 59.89207°N 10.53023°E

Homewood is a property in Sandvika, Bærum, Norway. It is known historically as the home of Otto Sverdrup, and has been municipal-owned since 1962.

== History ==
The property, located on the hill Sandviksåsen, was originally a part of the cotter's farm Sandviksgrunnene, which is in turn considered as the foundation of the modern town Sandvika. Sandviksgrunnene has various owners until bought by the Walle family in 1842. Anthon Walle took over in 1881, and during his time Homewood was separated from Sandviksgrunnene. The road in which Homewood is located is named after Anthon Walle. The origin of the name Homewood is uncertain.

Homewood was owned by ship-owner Chr. Klaveness around 1889, when the Swiss-style villa was built. The Swiss style had been spread to Sandvika as Sandvika Station was built in this style in 1872.

Otto Sverdrup lived here from 1908 to his death in 1930. He was considered among the Big Three of Norwegian polar exploration, together with Fridtjof Nansen and Roald Amundsen.

== Later use ==
In 1937 the property was bought by Bjarne Walle. In 1962 he bequeathed the property to Bærum municipality, on the condition that it be used for nervous patients. It was originally used as an office building, but in 2005 the villa was opened as a cultural centre for people with moderate mental disorders, under the name Villa Walle.
