= Otto Sverdrup =

Norwegian sailor and explorer

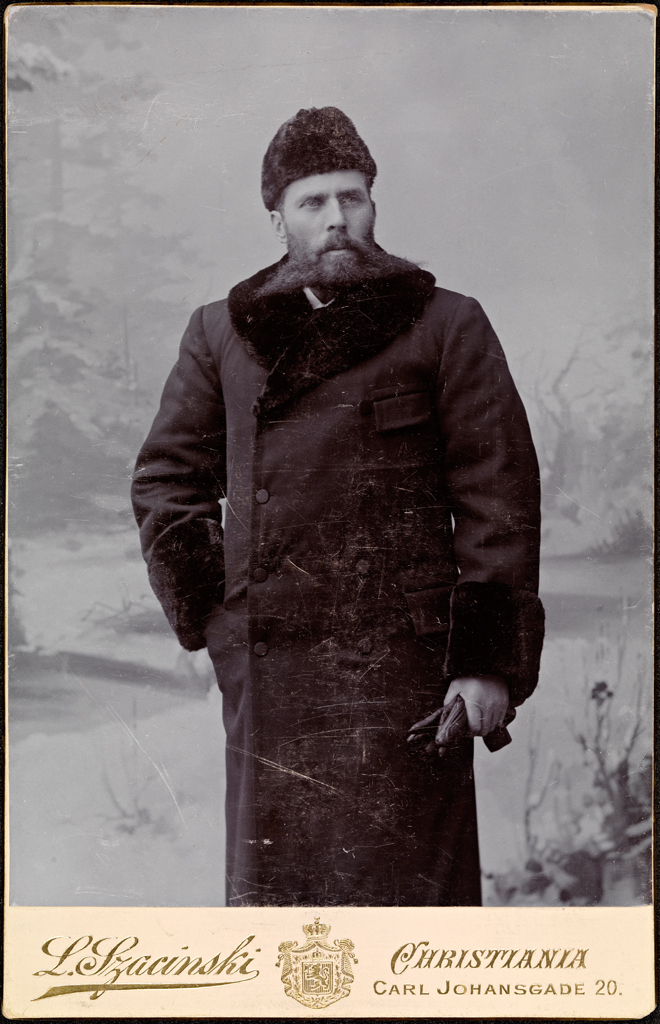
- Otto Sverdrup in 1898
- Born: 31 October 1854; Bindal, Norway
- Died: 26 November 1930 (aged 76)
- Known for: Arctic explorer

Otto Neumann Knoph Sverdrup (31 October 1854 – 26 November 1930) was a Norwegian sailor and Arctic explorer.

== Early and personal life ==
He was born in Bindal Municipality as a son of farmer Ulrik Frederik Suhm Sverdrup (1833–1914) and his wife Petra Neumann Knoph (1831–1885). He was a great-grandnephew of Georg Sverdrup and Jacob Liv Borch Sverdrup, first cousin twice removed of Harald Ulrik and Johan Sverdrup, second cousin once removed of Jakob, Georg and Edvard Sverdrup, third cousin of Georg Johan, Jakob, Mimi, Leif and Harald Ulrik Sverdrup. He was a brother-in-law of Johan Vaaler, and Otto himself married his own first cousin, Gretha Andrea Engelschiøn (1866–1937), in October 1891 in Kristiania. Their daughter Audhild Sverdrup (1893–1932) married Carl Johan Sverdrup Marstrander.

His father was born on Buøy in Kolvereid Municipality. As oldest son Otto was heir to the Sverdrup properties at Buøy. However, he left it all to his younger brothers and went to Åbygda in Bindal, to the farm named Hårstad, where Otto Sverdrup was born. In 1872, at the age of 17, Otto Sverdrup returned to Nærøy Municipality, to Ottersøy where his uncle Søren worked in transportation with his own vessels. Here Sverdrup started his career as a seaman and after a while he was sailing abroad. In 1875, he passed his mate's examination, and some years later the shipmaster's examination.

In 1877 Sverdrup's parents moved from Bindal to the farm Trana outside the town of Steinkjer. At this time O. T. Olsen, a teacher and employee in the bank at Kolvereid and a relative of his mother, had purchased the steamboat TRIO. Sverdrup was employed as captain. Around this time Sverdrup also met the lawyer Alexander Nansen who lived in the town of Namsos. He was the brother of Fridtjof Nansen and through him Sverdrup and Fridtjof Nansen learned to know each other.

== Career and expeditions ==
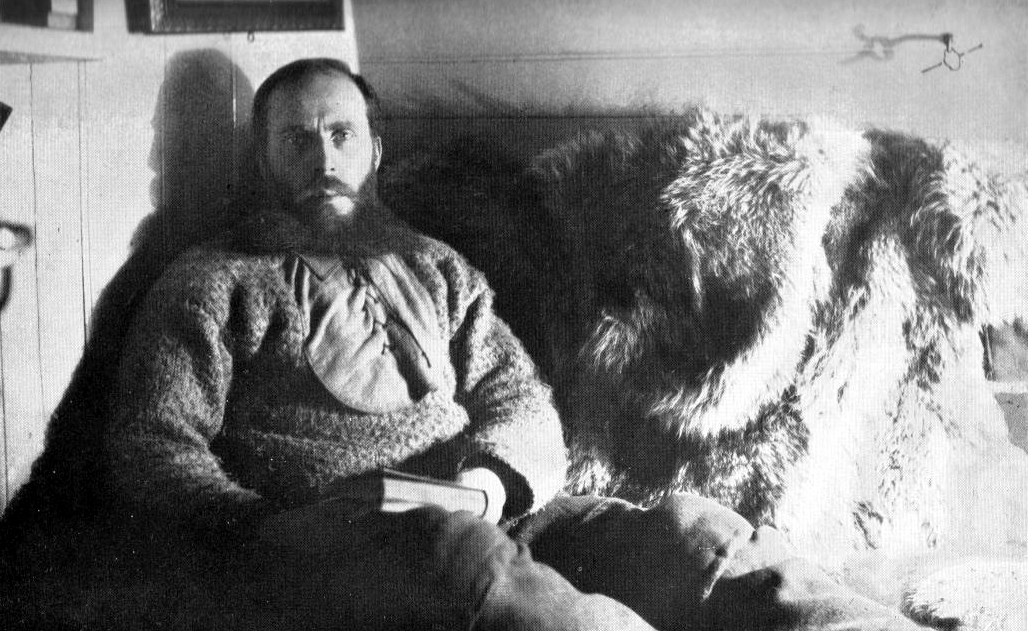
Photograph of Otto Sverdrup on the first journey of Fram.

Sverdrup joined Fridtjof Nansen's expedition of 1888 across Greenland. In 1892 he was an advisor to Fridtjof Nansen when the ship Fram was built. In 1893 Sverdrup was given command of the ship, and in 1895 he was left in charge of it while Nansen attempted to reach the North Pole. Sverdrup managed to free the ship from the ice near Svalbard in August 1896 and sailed to Skjervøy, arriving just 4 days after Nansen had reached Norway.

In the summer of 1897 Sverdrup worked as the shipmaster of Lofoten, a passenger ship to and from Svalbard. In 1898 he embarked on another expedition with Fram. Sverdrup attempted to circumnavigate Greenland via Baffin Bay but failed to make it through the Nares Strait. Forced to overwinter on Ellesmere Island, he and his crew explored and named many uncharted fjords and peninsulas on the western shores of the island, explaining the Norwegian names, such as Hoved Island ("main island") and Prince Gustav Adolf Sea (after the Swedish king Gustav VI Adolf) in the Canadian Arctic.

Between 1899 and 1902, he overwintered three more times on Ellesmere Island in the Canadian Arctic with the Fram, continuing to explore and map, culminating in the discovery of the islands to the west of Ellesmere Island, namely Axel Heiberg, Amund Ringnes and Ellef Ringnes, collectively known as the Sverdrup Islands. In adopting Inuit methods, Sverdrup and his crew were able to chart a total of 260,000 square kilometers - more than any other polar exploration. The area was famously mapped by his topographer, Gunnar Isachsen, and 35 academic publications were penned as a result of the expedition. Upon Sverdrup's return in Norway, he was treated as a national hero. However, he remains relatively unknown in North America, and relatively unknown for his Canadian exploration in Norway.

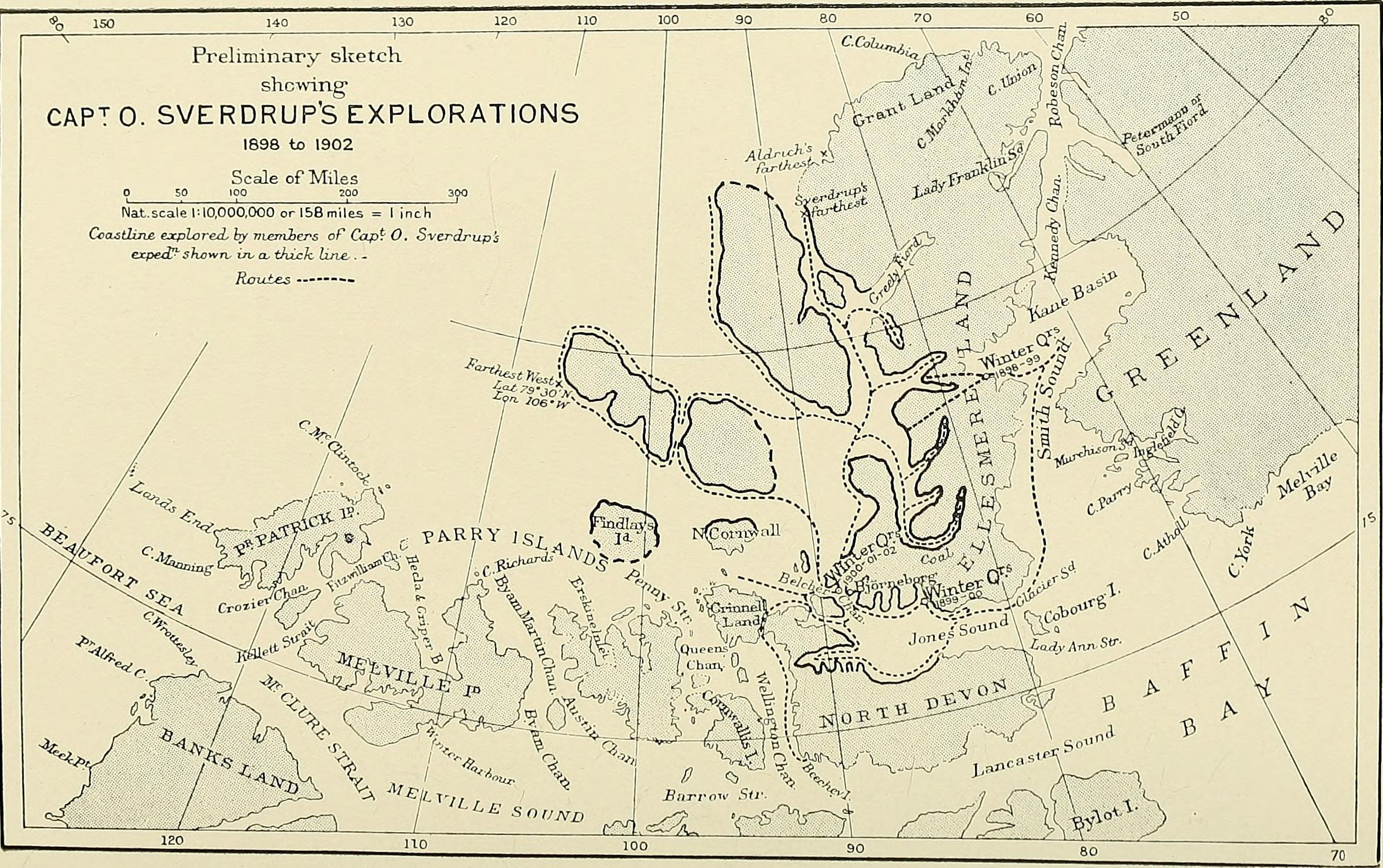
Sverdrup's explorations 1898-1902

Sverdrup officially claimed all three islands he discovered for Norway in 1902, setting off a sovereignty dispute with Canada, which claimed sovereignty over all land, discovered or undiscovered in what is now the Canadian Arctic. The dispute was not settled until 1930 when Norway ceded the islands to Canada. In that year Sverdrup signed a deal with the Canadian Government, who would buy the records of Sverdrup's expeditions for $67,000 Canadian dollars. Sverdrup died just two weeks after the deal was signed, but the money secured the future of his family. The records were archived in the National Archives of Canada, but were later returned to the National Library of Norway.

One of Sverdrup's lesser known exploits was a search-and-rescue expedition aboard ship Eklips in the Kara Sea in 1914–1915. His aim was to search for two missing Arctic expeditions, that of Captain Georgy Brusilov on the St. Anna and that of Vladimir Rusanov on the Gerkules. Sverdrup's fourth and last expedition in Arctic Siberian waters was in 1921, when, from the bridge of the Soviet Icebreaker Lenin, he commanded a convoy of five cargo ships on an experimental run through the Kara Sea to the mouths of the Ob and Yenisei. The ships reached their destinations and returned safely. This was considered an important step in the development of the Kara Sea sector of the Northern Sea Route. Sverdrup also has an unsuccessful business venture in Cuba, a plantation project in the Oriente Province in 1904.

== Later life and legacy ==
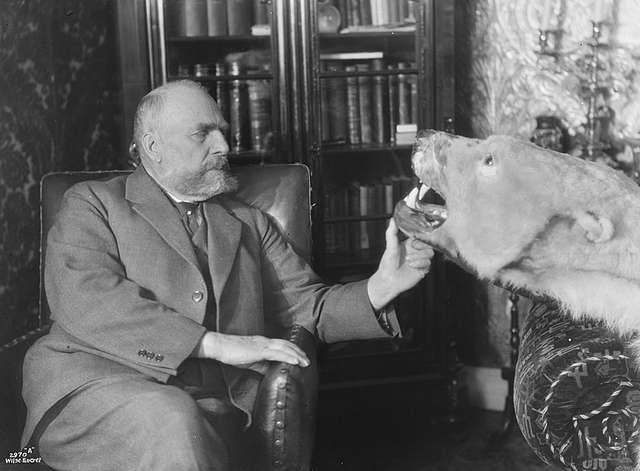
Sverdrup in 1928.

The last years of his life he lived in Sandvika, at the property Homewood on a hill overlooking the town. He died in November 1930. A statue of Sverdrup was erected in Steinkjer in 1957, and in 1999 a statue of Sverdrup was erected in Sandvika, in the square named after him, Otto Sverdrups plass. In 2008, the Royal Norwegian Navy commissioned the HNoMS Otto Sverdrup, a Nansen class frigate, in honor of the mariner and explorer.

He was made a Commander 1st Class of the Royal Norwegian Order of St. Olav in 1896, and promoted to Grand Cross in 1902. In addition, he was awarded gold medals from the Norwegian Geographical Society in 1889 and the Royal Geographical Society in 1903, and received an honorary degree at the University of St Andrews.

Sverdrup had also been made a Knight 1st Class of the Prussian Order of the Crown in 1902, but in an open letter to the German legation in Oslo on 25 October 1917 declared that he was returning the order in protest against the unrestricted warfare then being waged by the German U-boats in the First World War, causing the deaths of hundreds of Norwegian sailors. The day before Sverdrup's return of his order, fellow explorer Roald Amundsen had also returned his German awards.
