= Homewood (surname) =

Homewood is an English surname. Notable people with the surname include:

- John Homewood (1932–1991), English football referee
- Roy Homewood, American football player and coach
- Thomas Homewood (1881–1945), British tug of war competitor
- William Homewood (1920–1989), British politician
