= Amundsen's South Pole expedition =

1911 expedition to the South Pole

- Amundsen, Hanssen, Hassel, and Wisting at Polheim at the South Pole
- Leader: Roald Amundsen
- Start: Framheim, Great Ice Barrier; 19 October 1911
- End: Geographic South Pole; 14 December 1911
- Ships: Fram
- Crew: Roald Amundsen; Helmer Hanssen; Sverre Hassel; Oscar Wisting; Olav Bjaaland; (plus 14 shore crew)
- Achievements: First to reach the South Pole; First exploration of Edward VII Land; Discovery of Axel Heiberg Glacier

Route
- Amundsen's route compared to Scott's

The first expedition to reach the Geographic South Pole was led by the Norwegian explorer Roald Amundsen. He and four other crew members made it to the geographical South Pole on 14 December 1911, (Note: Some sources give the date as 15 December. Since the western and eastern hemispheres—and the International Date Line—are conjoined at the South Pole, both dates can be considered as correct, though Amundsen gives 14 December, both in his first telegraphed report on arrival in Hobart, and in his fuller account The South Pole.) which was to be five weeks ahead of the British party led by Robert Falcon Scott as part of the Terra Nova Expedition. Amundsen and his team returned safely to their base, and about a year later heard that Scott and his four companions had perished on their return journey.

Amundsen's initial plans had focused on the Arctic and the conquest of the North Pole by means of an extended drift in an icebound ship. He obtained the use of Fridtjof Nansen's polar exploration ship Fram, and undertook extensive fundraising in a country that had gained its independence only some six years earlier. Preparations for this expedition were disrupted when, in 1909, the rival American explorers Frederick Cook and Robert Peary each claimed to have reached the North Pole - both claims are highly disputed. Amundsen then changed his plan and began to prepare for a conquest of the South Pole; uncertain of the extent to which the public and his backers would support him, he kept this revised objective secret. When he set out in June 1910, he led even his crew to believe they were embarking on an Arctic drift, and revealed their true Antarctic destination only when Fram was leaving their last port of call, Madeira, on 9 September 1910.

Amundsen made his Antarctic base, which he named "Framheim" (Home of Fram, after their ship Fram), in the Bay of Whales on the Great Ice Barrier. After months of preparation, depot-laying and a false start that ended in near-disaster, he and his party set out for the pole in October 1911. In the course of their journey they discovered the Axel Heiberg Glacier, which provided their route to the polar plateau and ultimately to the South Pole. The party's mastery of the use of skis and their expertise with sled dogs ensured rapid and relatively trouble-free travel. Other achievements of the expedition included the first exploration of King Edward VII Land and an extensive oceanographic cruise.

The expedition's success was widely applauded, and was later compared to the Apollo flight to the Moon, in its manner of spending resources and keeping focus on the primary goal of reaching the geographical South Pole. Though the story of Scott's so-called heroic failure, meaning the death of his full crew, overshadowed Amundsen's achievement in the United Kingdom, Amundsen's decision to keep his true plans secret until the last moment was criticised by some. Recent polar historians have more fully recognised the skill and courage of Amundsen's party; the permanent scientific base at the pole bears his name, together with that of Scott.

== Background ==
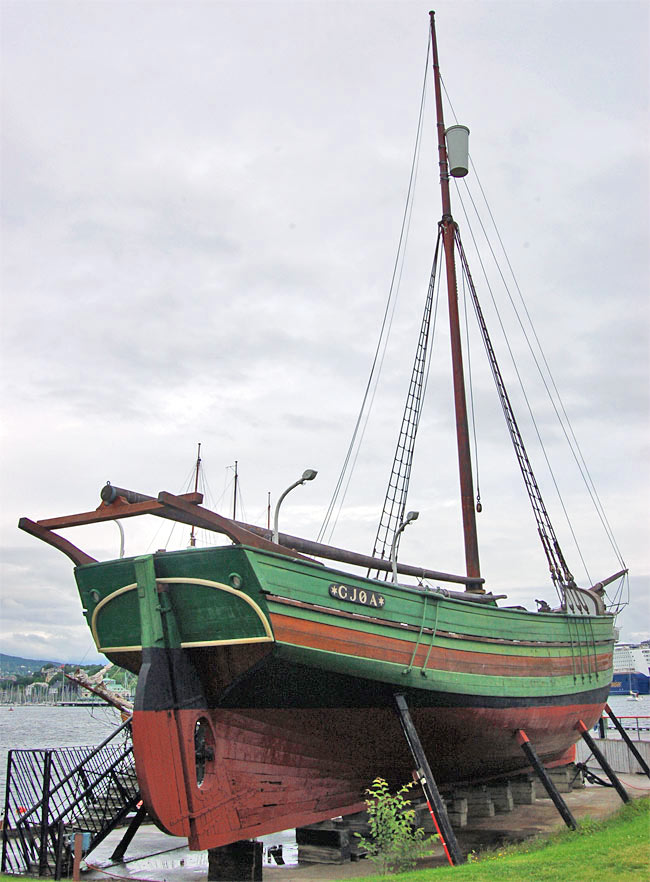
Gjøa, the small sloop in which Amundsen and his crew conquered the Northwest Passage, 1903–06

Amundsen was born in Fredrikstad around 80 km from Christiania (now Oslo), Norway, in 1872, the son of a ship-owner. In 1893, the adventurous young man abandoned his medical studies at Christiania University and signed up as a seaman aboard the sealer Magdalena for a voyage to the Arctic. After several further voyages he qualified as a second mate; when not at sea, he developed his skills as a cross-country skier in the harsh environment of Norway's Hardangervidda plateau. In 1896, inspired by the polar exploits of his countryman Fridtjof Nansen, Amundsen joined the Belgian Antarctic Expedition as mate, aboard Belgica under Adrien de Gerlache. Early in 1898 the ship became entrapped by pack ice in the Bellinghausen Sea, and was held fast for almost a year. The expedition thus became, involuntarily, the first to spend a complete winter in Antarctic waters, a period marked by depression, near-starvation, insanity, and scurvy among the crew. Amundsen remained dispassionate, recording everything and using the experience as an education in all aspects of polar exploration techniques, particularly aids, clothing and diet.

The Belgica's voyage marked the beginning of what would become to be known as the Heroic Age of Antarctic Exploration, and was rapidly followed by expeditions from the United Kingdom, Sweden, Germany and France. However, on his return to Norway in 1899, Amundsen turned his attention northwards. Confident in his abilities to lead an expedition, he planned a traversal of the Northwest Passage, the then-uncharted sea route from the Atlantic to the Pacific through the labyrinth of north Canadian islands. Having earned his master's ticket, Amundsen acquired a small sloop, Gjøa, which he adapted for Arctic travel. He secured the patronage of King Oscar of Sweden and Norway, the support of Nansen, and sufficient financial backing to set out in June 1903 with a crew of six. The voyage lasted until 1906 and was wholly successful; the Northwest Passage, which had defeated mariners for centuries, was finally conquered. At the age of 34 Amundsen became a national hero, in the first rank of polar explorers.

In November 1906 the American Robert Peary returned from his latest unsuccessful quest for the North Pole, claiming a new Farthest North of 87° 6′—a record disputed by later historians. He immediately began raising funds for a further attempt. In July 1907 Dr Frederick Cook, a former shipmate of Amundsen's from Belgica, set off northwards on what was ostensibly a hunting trip but was rumoured to be an attempt on the North Pole. A month later Ernest Shackleton's Nimrod Expedition sailed for Antarctica, while Robert Falcon Scott was preparing a further expedition should Shackleton fail. Amundsen saw no reason to concede priority in the south to the British, and spoke publicly about the prospects of leading an Antarctic expedition—although his preferred goal remained the North Pole.

== Preparation ==
=== Nansen and Fram ===
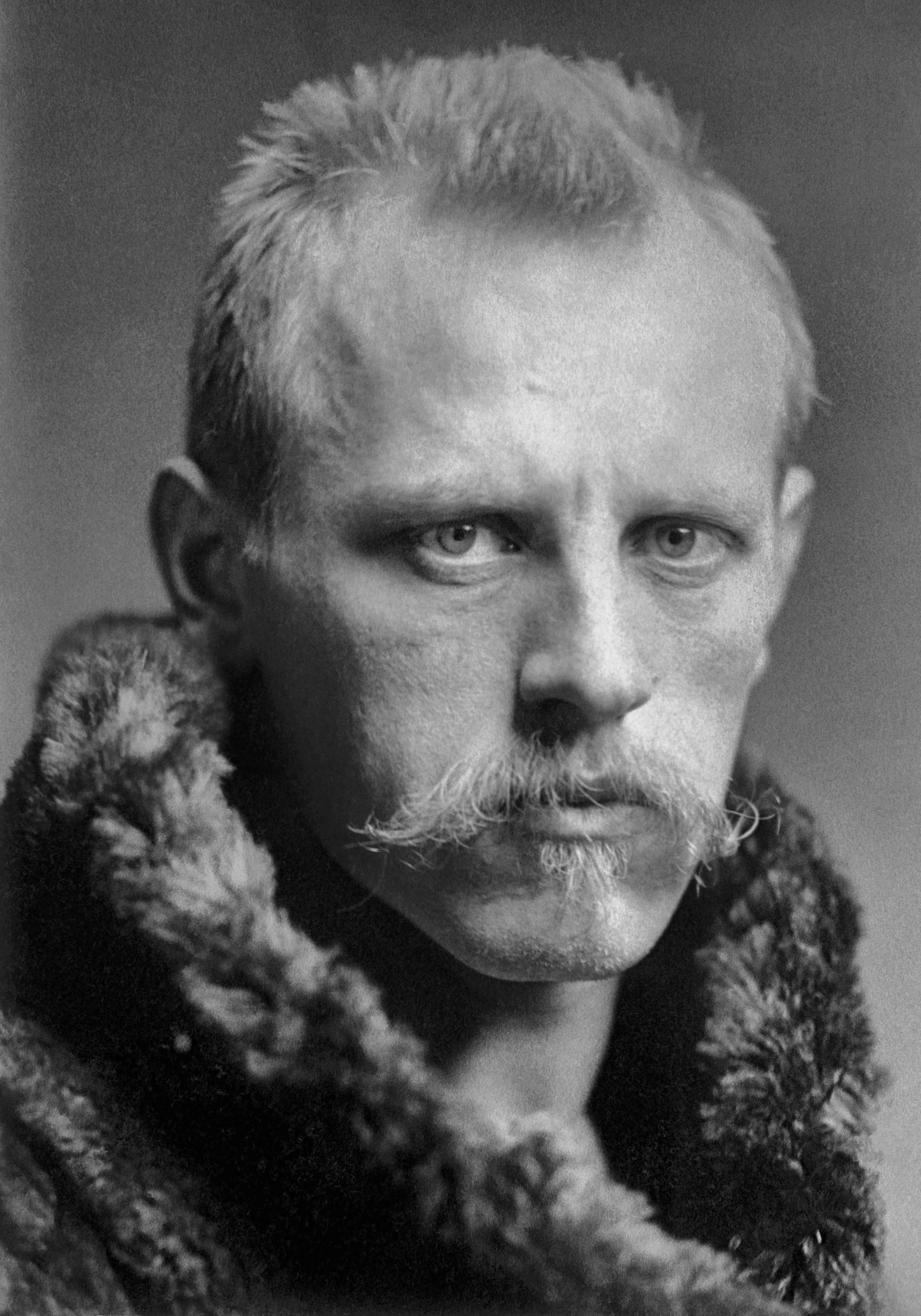
Fridtjof Nansen, whose Arctic drift of 1893–96 inspired Amundsen

In 1893 Nansen had driven his ship Fram into the Arctic pack ice off the northern Siberian coast and allowed it to drift in the ice towards Greenland, hoping that this route would cross the North Pole. In the event, the drift did not approach the pole, and an attempt by Nansen and his companion Hjalmar Johansen to reach it on foot was likewise unsuccessful. Nevertheless, Nansen's strategy became the basis of Amundsen's own Arctic plans. He reasoned that if he entered the Arctic Ocean via the Bering Strait, well to the east of Nansen's starting point, his ship would achieve a more northerly drift and pass near or through the pole.

Amundsen consulted Nansen, who insisted that Fram was the only vessel fit for such an undertaking. Fram had been designed and built in 1891–93 by Colin Archer, Norway's leading shipbuilder and naval architect, in accordance with Nansen's exacting specifications, as a vessel that would withstand prolonged exposure to the harshest of Arctic conditions. The ship's most distinctive feature was its rounded hull which, according to Nansen, enabled the vessel to "slip like an eel out of the embraces of the ice". For extra strength the hull was sheathed in South American greenheart, the hardest timber available, and crossbeams and braces were fitted throughout its length. The ship's wide beam of 36 feet (11 m) in relation to its overall length of 128 feet (39 m) gave it a markedly stubby appearance. This shape improved its strength in the ice but affected its performance in the open sea, where it moved sluggishly and was inclined to roll most uncomfortably. However, its looks, speed, and sailing qualities were secondary to the provision of a secure and warm shelter for the crew during a voyage that might extend over several years.

Fram had emerged virtually unscathed from Nansen's expedition after nearly three years in the polar ice. On its return it had been refitted, before spending four years under the command of Otto Sverdrup, charting and exploring 100,000 square miles (260,000 km^{2}) of uninhabited territory in the northern Canadian islands. After Sverdrup's voyage ended in 1902 Fram was laid up in Christiania. Although the ship was technically the property of the state, it was tacitly acknowledged that Nansen had first call on it. After his return from the Arctic in 1896 he had aspired to take Fram on an expedition to Antarctica, but by 1907 such hopes had faded. Late in September of that year, Amundsen was summoned to Nansen's home and told he could have the ship.

=== Initial steps ===
Amundsen made his plans public on 10 November 1908, at a meeting of the Norwegian Geographical Society. He would take Fram around Cape Horn to the Pacific Ocean; after provisioning in San Francisco the ship would continue northwards, through the Bering Strait to Point Barrow. From here he would set a course directly into the ice to begin a drift that would extend over four or five years. Science would be as important as geographical exploration; continuous observations would, Amundsen hoped, help to explain a number of unresolved problems. The plan was received enthusiastically, and the next day King Haakon VII (Note: Norway had separated from Sweden in 1905. King Oscar of Sweden relinquished the Norwegian throne and Prince Carl of Denmark became King Haakon VII of Norway.) opened a subscription list with a gift of 20,000 kroner. On 6 February 1909 the Norwegian Parliament approved a grant of 75,000 kroner to refit the ship. The general fundraising and business management of the expedition was placed in the hands of Amundsen's brother Leon so that the explorer could concentrate on the more practical aspects of organisation.

In March 1909 it was announced that Shackleton had reached a southern latitude of 88° 23′—97 nautical miles (180 km) from the South Pole—before turning back; thus, as Amundsen observed, in the south "a little corner remained". He was unreserved in his praise for Shackleton's achievement, writing that Shackleton was the south's equivalent of Nansen in the north. Following this near miss, Scott immediately confirmed his intention to lead an expedition (what became the Terra Nova Expedition) that would encompass the "little corner" and claim the prize for the British Empire.

=== Personnel ===
Roald Amundsen, the expedition's leader

Amundsen chose three naval lieutenants as his expedition's officers: Thorvald Nilsen, a navigator who would be second-in-command; Hjalmar Fredrik Gjertsen, and Kristian Prestrud. Gjertsen, despite lacking a medical background, was made expedition doctor, and was sent on a "lightning course" in surgery and dentistry. A naval gunner, Oscar Wisting, was accepted on Prestrud's recommendation because he could turn his hand to most tasks. Although he had little previous experience of sledge dogs, Amundsen wrote that Wisting developed "a way of his own" with them, and became a useful amateur veterinarian.

An early choice for the party was Olav Bjaaland, a champion skier who was also a skilled carpenter and ski-maker. Bjaaland was from Morgedal in the Telemark province of Norway, a region renowned for the prowess of its skiers and as the home of the pioneer of modern techniques, Sondre Norheim. Amundsen shared Nansen's belief that skis and sledge dogs provided by far the most efficient method of Arctic transport, and was determined to recruit the most skilful dog drivers. Helmer Hanssen, who had proved his worth on the Gjøa expedition, agreed to travel with Amundsen again. He was joined later by Sverre Hassel, an expert on dogs, and veteran of Sverdrup's 1898–1902 Fram voyage, who intended only to travel with Amundsen as far as San Francisco. The carpenter Jørgen Stubberud built a portable building to serve as base for the expedition, which could be dismantled and prepared for shipment with the Fram. Stubberud asked Amundsen for permission to join the expedition, which was granted. Mindful of the value of a competent cook, Amundsen secured the services of Adolf Lindstrøm, another Sverdrup veteran who had been cook aboard Gjøa.

From his experiences on board Belgica and Gjøa, Amundsen had learned the importance of choosing stable and compatible companions, and with these experienced personnel he felt he had the core of his expedition. He continued to recruit through 1909; the Fram party would eventually total 19. All of these except one were Amundsen's personal choices; the exception was Hjalmar Johansen, who was taken on at the request of Nansen. Since his epic march with Nansen, Johansen had been unable to settle down. Despite the efforts of Nansen and others to help him, his life became a downward spiral of drunkenness and debt. Nansen wished to give his former comrade a final chance to show that he was still a capable worker in the field; feeling that he could not refuse Nansen's wishes, Amundsen reluctantly accepted Johansen. The party contained two foreigners: a young Russian oceanographer Alexander Kuchin (or Kutchin), who was a pupil of Bjorn Helland-Hansen, and a Swedish engineer, Knut Sundbeck.

=== Change of plan ===
In September 1909 newspapers carried reports that Cook and Peary had each reached the North Pole, Cook in April 1908 and Peary a year later. Asked to comment, Amundsen avoided an outright endorsement of either explorer, but surmised that "probably something will be left to be done". While he avoided the controversy over the rival claims, (Note: Peary quickly denounced Cook's claim as false, and subsequent investigations cast serious doubts on the latter's records. Peary's data, though challenged by Cook, were accepted without question by the National Geographic Society (which had sponsored his expedition). Public support for Cook quickly faded, although he retained some support, including that of Amundsen. Peary was generally accepted as the conqueror of the North Pole until late 20th century research, particularly that of the explorer Wally Herbert, indicated that Peary did not in fact reach the North Pole.) he saw immediately that his own plans would be seriously affected. Without the allure of capturing the pole, he would struggle to maintain public interest or funding. "If the expedition was to be saved ... there was nothing left for me but to try and solve the last great problem—the South Pole". Thus Amundsen decided to go south; the Arctic drift could wait "for a year or two" until the South Pole had been conquered.

Amundsen did not publicise his change of plan. As Scott's biographer David Crane points out, the expedition's public and private funding was earmarked for scientific work in the Arctic; there was no guarantee that the backers would understand or agree to the proposed volte-face. Furthermore, the altered objective might cause Nansen to revoke the use of Fram, or parliament to halt the expedition for fear of undermining Scott and offending the British. Amundsen concealed his intentions from everyone except his brother Leon and his second-in-command, Nilsen. This secrecy led to awkwardness; Scott had sent Amundsen instruments to enable their two expeditions, at opposite ends of the earth, to make comparative readings. When Scott, in Norway to test his motor sledges, telephoned Amundsen at home to discuss cooperation, the Norwegian refused to take the call.

The privately revised expedition schedule required Fram to leave Norway in August 1910 and sail to Madeira in the Atlantic, its only port of call. From there the ship would proceed directly to the Ross Sea in Antarctica, heading for the Bay of Whales, an inlet on the Ross Ice Shelf (then known as the "Great Ice Barrier") where Amundsen intended to make his base camp. The Bay of Whales was the southernmost point in the Ross Sea to which a ship could penetrate, 60 nautical miles (110 km) closer to the Pole than Scott's intended base at McMurdo Sound. In 1907–09 Shackleton had considered the ice in the Bay of Whales to be unstable, but from his studies of Shackleton's records Amundsen decided that the Barrier here was grounded on shoals or skerries, and would support a safe and secure base. (Note: Amundsen's theory about grounded ice was eventually proved wrong, although the ice in the vicinity of his camp did not break away significantly until 1987 and 2000.) After landing the shore party, Fram was to carry out oceanographic work in the Atlantic before picking up the shore party early in the following year.

=== Transport, equipment and supplies ===
Olav Bjaaland dressed for winter travel: "Not an outfit that cut a dash by its appearance, but it was warm and strong"

Amundsen did not understand the apparent aversion of British explorers to dogs: "Can it be that the dog has not understood its master? Or is it the master who has not understood the dog?" he later wrote. Following his decision to go south he ordered 100 North Greenland sledge dogs—the best and strongest available.

The party's ski boots, specially designed by Amundsen, were the product of two years' testing and modification in search of perfection. The party's polar clothing included suits of sealskin from Northern Greenland, and clothes fashioned after the traditional garments of the Netsilik Inuit from reindeer skins, wolf skin, Burberry cloth and gabardine. The sledges were constructed from Norwegian ash with steel-shod runners made from American hickory. Skis, also fashioned from hickory, were extra long to reduce the likelihood of slipping into crevasses. The tents—"the strongest and most practical that have ever been used"—had built-in floors and required a single pole. For cooking on the march, Amundsen chose the Swedish Primus stove rather than the special cooker devised by Nansen, because he felt the latter took up too much space.

From his experiences on Belgica, Amundsen was aware of the dangers of scurvy. Although the true cause of the disease, vitamin C deficiency, was not understood at the time, it was generally known that the disease could be countered by eating fresh raw meat. To neutralise the danger, Amundsen planned to supplement sledging rations with regular helpings of seal meat. He also ordered a special kind of pemmican which included vegetables and oatmeal: "a more stimulating, nourishing and appetising food it would be impossible to find". The expedition was well supplied with wines and spirits, for use as medicine and on festive or social occasions. Mindful of the loss of morale on Belgica, Amundsen provided for leisure time with a library of around 3,000 books, a gramophone, a large quantity of records and a range of musical instruments.

=== Departure ===
Fram under sail

In the months before departure, funds for the expedition became harder to acquire. Because of limited public interest, newspaper deals were cancelled and parliament refused a request for a further 25,000 kroner. Amundsen mortgaged his house to keep the expedition afloat; heavily in debt, he was now wholly dependent on the expedition's success to avoid personal financial ruin.

Fram's masthead pennant during the expedition

After a month's trial cruise in the northern Atlantic, Fram sailed to Kristiansand in late July 1910 to take the dogs on board and to make final preparations for departure. While at Kristiansand, Amundsen received an offer of help from Peter "Don Pedro" Christophersen, a Norwegian expatriate whose brother was Norway's Minister in Buenos Aires. Christophersen would provide fuel and other provisions to Fram at either Montevideo or Buenos Aires, an offer which Amundsen gratefully accepted. Just before Fram sailed on 9 August, Amundsen revealed the expedition's true destination to the two junior officers, Prestrud and Gjertsen. On the four-week voyage to Funchal in Madeira, a mood of uncertainty developed among the crew, who could not make sense of some of the preparations and whose questions were met with evasive answers from their officers. This, says Amundsen's biographer Roland Huntford, was "enough to generate suspicion and low spirits".

Fram reached Funchal on 6 September. Three days later Amundsen informed the crew of the revised plan. He told them he intended to make "a detour" to the South Pole on the way to the North Pole, which was still his ultimate destination, but would have to wait for a while. After Amundsen outlined his new proposals, each man was asked whether he was willing to go on, and all responded positively. Amundsen wrote a lengthy letter of explanation to Nansen, stressing how the North Pole claims of Cook and Peary had dealt a "death blow" to his original plans. He felt he had been forced into this action by necessity, asked for forgiveness and expressed the hope that his achievements would ultimately atone for any offence.

Before leaving Funchal on 9 September Amundsen sent a cable to Scott, to inform him of the change of plan. Scott's ship Terra Nova had left Cardiff amid much publicity on 15 June, and was due to arrive in Australia early in October. It was to Melbourne that Amundsen sent his telegram, containing the bare information that he was proceeding southwards. (Note: The exact wording of this telegram has been differently reported. Crane and Preston, p. 127, record the wording as "Am going south"; Jones, p. 78, and Huntford (The Last Place on Earth) 1985, p. 299, give a longer text: "Beg leave to inform you Fram proceeding Antarctica".) No indication was given of the Norwegian's plans or his destination in Antarctica; Scott wrote to the Royal Geographical Society (RGS) secretary, John Scott Keltie: "We shall know in due course I suppose". News of Amundsen's revised plans reached Norway early in October and provoked a generally hostile response. Although Nansen gave his blessing and warm approval, Amundsen's actions were with few exceptions condemned by press and public, and funding dried up almost completely. Reactions in Britain were predictably adverse; an initial disbelief expressed by Keltie soon turned to anger and scorn. "I have sent full details of Amundsen's underhand conduct to Scott ... If I was Scott I would not let them land", wrote Sir Clements Markham, the influential former RGS president. Unaware of the world's reactions, Fram sailed south for four months. The first icebergs were sighted on New Year's Day 1911; the Barrier itself came into view on 11 January, and on 14 January Fram was in the Bay of Whales.

== First season, 1910–11 ==
=== Framheim ===
The base at Framheim, February 1911

After Fram was anchored to ice in an inlet in the south-eastern corner of the Bay, Amundsen selected a site for the expedition's main hut, 2.2 nautical miles (4.1 km) from the ship. Six teams of dogs were used to move supplies to the site, as work on erecting the hut began. Bjaaland and Stubberud laid the foundations deep into the ice, levelling the sloping ground. Because the prevailing winds came from the east, the hut was erected on an east–west axis, with the door facing west; in this way the wind caught only the shorter eastern wall. The roof was in place by 21 January, and six days later the hut was complete. By then a large supply of meat—including 200 seals—had been brought to the base, for use by the shore party and to be laid in depots before the journey to the pole. The base was dubbed Framheim, "the home of Fram".

Early on the morning of 3 February, Terra Nova arrived unexpectedly in the Bay of Whales. She had sailed from New Zealand on 29 November 1910 and had arrived in McMurdo Sound early in January. After landing Scott and his main party there, Terra Nova had taken a party of six men, led by Victor Campbell, eastward to King Edward VII Land. This group intended to explore this then-unknown territory, but had been prevented by sea ice from approaching the shore. The ship was sailing westward along the Barrier edge in search of a possible landing place when it encountered Fram. Scott had previously speculated that Amundsen might make his base in the Weddell Sea area, on the opposite side of the continent; this proof that the Norwegians would be starting the race for the pole with a 60 nautical mile advantage was an alarming prospect for the British. The two groups behaved civilly towards each other; Campbell and his officers Harry Pennell and George Murray Levick breakfasted aboard Fram, and reciprocated with lunch on the Terra Nova. Amundsen was relieved to learn that Terra Nova had no wireless (radio), since that might have imperilled his strategy to be first with the news of a polar victory. He was worried, however, by a remark of Campbell's that implied that Scott's motorised sledges were working well. Nevertheless, he offered the British party a site alongside Framheim as a base for the exploration of King Edward VII Land. Campbell turned the offer down, and sailed for McMurdo Sound to inform Scott of Amundsen's whereabouts.

=== Depot journeys ===
One of the men with a dog team and sledge on the Barrier in early 1911

In early February Amundsen began organising the depot-laying journeys across the Barrier, in preparation for the following summer's assault on the pole. Supply depots laid in advance at regular intervals on the projected route would limit the amount of food and fuel that the South Pole party would have to carry. The depot journeys would be the first true tests of equipment, dogs and men. For the first journey, to begin on 10 February, Amundsen chose Prestrud, Helmer Hanssen and Johansen to accompany him; 18 dogs would pull three sledges. Before leaving, Amundsen left instructions with Nilsen regarding Fram. The ship was to sail to Buenos Aires for reprovisioning, before undertaking a programme of oceanographic work in the Southern Ocean and then returning to the Barrier as early as possible in 1912. (Note: Amundsen had divided the expedition into sea and shore parties. The sea party, under Nilsen, sailed with Fram; the nine-man shore party consisted of Amundsen, Prestrud, Johansen, Helmer Hanssen, Hassel, Bjaaland, Stubberud, Wisting and Lindstrøm. In The South Pole, Vol. I, p. 179, Amundsen omits Wisting from the shore party.)

When the four men began their journey south, their only knowledge of the Barrier was from books previous explorers had published, and they anticipated difficult travelling conditions. They were surprised to find the Barrier surface was much like that of a conventional glacier; they covered 15 nautical miles (28 km) on the first day. Amundsen noted how well his dogs were performing in these conditions, and wondered at the English aversion to the use of dogs on the Barrier. The party reached 80° S on 14 February, and after laying the depot turned for home, reaching Framheim on 16 February.

The second depot-laying party left Framheim on 22 February, with eight men, seven sledges and forty-two dogs. Conditions on the Barrier had deteriorated sharply; average temperatures had dropped by 9 °C (16 °F), and rough snow had drifted across the previously smooth ice surface. In temperatures sometimes as low as −40 °C (−40 °F), on 3 March the party reached 81° S, where they established a second depot. Amundsen, Helmer Hanssen, Prestrud, Johansen and Wisting then continued with the strongest dogs, hoping to reach 83° S, but in difficult conditions they halted at 82° S on 8 March. Amundsen could see that the dogs were exhausted; the party turned for home, and with light sledges travelled swiftly to reach Framheim on 22 March. Amundsen wanted more supplies taken south before the impending polar night made travel impossible, and on 31 March a party of seven men led by Johansen left Framheim for the 80° S depot with six slaughtered seals—2,400 pounds (1,100 kg) of meat. The party returned on 11 April—three days later than expected—after they strayed into a field of crevasses.

Overall, the depot-laying journeys established three depots containing 7,500 pounds (3,400 kg) of supplies, which included 3,000 pounds (1,400 kg) of seal meat and 40 imperial gallons (180 L) of paraffin oil. Amundsen learned much from the journeys, especially on the second, when the dogs struggled with sledges that were too heavy. He decided to increase the number of dogs for the polar journey, if necessary at the expense of the number of men. The journeys revealed some disunity among the men, particularly between Johansen and Amundsen. During the second depot journey, Johansen openly complained about the unsatisfactory nature of the equipment; Amundsen believed that his authority had been challenged.

=== Winter ===
Sverre Hassel in the oil store at Framheim during the winter of 1911

The sun set over Framheim on 21 April, not to reappear for four months. Amundsen was mindful of the boredom and loss of morale that had blighted the Belgica expedition's winter in the ice, and although there was no possibility of sledging he ensured that the shore party kept busy. One urgent task was to improve the sledges, which had not worked well during the depot journeys. In addition to those chosen specifically for the expedition, Amundsen had brought along several sledges from Sverdrup's 1898–1902 Fram expedition, which he now thought would be better suited to the task ahead. Bjaaland reduced the weight of these older sledges by almost a third by planing down the timber, and also constructed three sledges of his own from some spare hickory wood. The adapted sledges were to be used to cross the Barrier, while Bjaaland's new set would be used in the final stages of the journey, across the polar plateau itself. Johansen prepared the sledging rations (42,000 biscuits, 1,320 tins of pemmican and about 220 pounds (100 kg) of chocolate), while other men worked on improving the boots, cooking equipment, goggles, skis and tents. To combat the dangers of scurvy, twice a day the men ate seal meat that had been collected and frozen in quantities before the onset of winter. The cook, Lindstrøm, supplemented the vitamin C intake with bottled cloudberries and blueberries, and provided wholemeal bread made with fresh yeast, rich in B vitamins.

While Amundsen was confident in his men and equipment, he was, Hassel recorded, tormented by thoughts of Scott's motor sledges and the fear that these would carry the British party to success. With this in mind Amundsen planned to begin the polar journey as soon as the sun rose in late August, though Johansen warned that it would be too cold on the Barrier so early in the season. Amundsen overruled him, and at sunrise on 24 August seven sledges were made ready. Johansen's concerns seemed justified, as harsh conditions for the next two weeks—temperatures as low as −58 °C (−72 °F)—prevented the men from leaving. On 8 September 1911, when the temperature rose to −27 °C (−17 °F), Amundsen decided he could wait no longer, and the party of eight set off; Lindstrøm remained alone at Framheim.

== Second season, 1911–12 ==
Amundsen's route to the pole, Oct–Dec 1911. The depots marked at 80, 81 and 82° were laid in the first season, Feb–March 1911. Shackleton's 1908–09 route, as followed by Scott, is to the right.

=== False start ===
The party made good initial progress, travelling around 15 nautical miles (28 km) each day. The dogs ran so hard that several from the strongest teams were detached from the traces and secured onto the sledges to act as ballast. In their wolf-skin and reindeer-skin clothing the men could cope with the freezing temperatures while they kept moving, but when they stopped they suffered, and barely slept at night. The dogs' paws became frostbitten. On 12 September, with temperatures down to −56 °C (−69 °F), the party halted after only 4 nautical miles (7.4 km) and built igloos for shelter. Amundsen now recognised that they had started the march too early in the season, and decided they should return to Framheim. He would not risk the lives of men and dogs for reasons of stubbornness. Johansen, in his diary, wrote of the foolishness of starting prematurely on such a long and historic journey, and of the dangers of an obsession with beating the English.

On 14 September, on their way back to Framheim, they left most of their equipment at the 80° S depot, to lighten the sledges. The next day, in freezing temperatures with a strong headwind, several dogs froze to death while others, too weak to continue, were placed upon the sledges. On 16 September, 40 nautical miles (74 km) from Framheim, Amundsen ordered his men to push for home as quickly as possible. Not having a sledge of his own, he leapt onto Wisting's, and with Helmer Hanssen and his team raced away, leaving the rest behind. The three arrived back at Framheim after nine hours, followed by Stubberud and Bjaaland two hours later and Hassel shortly after. Johansen and Prestrud were still out on the ice, without food or fuel; Prestrud's dogs had failed, and his heels were badly frostbitten. They reached Framheim after midnight, more than seventeen hours after they had turned for home.

Next day, Amundsen asked Johansen why he and Prestrud had been so late. Johansen answered angrily that he felt they had been abandoned, and castigated the leader for leaving his men behind. Amundsen would later inform Nansen that Johansen had been "violently insubordinate"; as a result, he was excluded from the polar party, which Amundsen now reduced to five. Johansen was placed under the command of Prestrud, much his junior as an explorer, in a party that would explore King Edward VII Land. Stubberud was persuaded to join them, leaving Amundsen, Helmer Hanssen, Bjaaland, Hassel and Wisting as the revised South Pole party.

=== South Pole journey ===
==== Barrier and mountains ====
Men and dogs at the 85° South depot, on the way to the pole, 15 November 1911

Despite his excitement to start out again, Amundsen waited until mid-October and the first hints of spring. He was ready to leave on 15 October, but was held up by the weather for a few more days. On 19 October 1911 the five men, with four sledges and fifty-two dogs, began their journey. The weather quickly worsened, and in heavy fog the party strayed into the field of crevasses that Johansen's depot party had discovered the previous autumn. Wisting later recalled how his sledge, with Amundsen aboard, nearly disappeared down a crevasse when the snow bridge broke underneath it.

Despite this near mishap they were covering more than 15 nautical miles (28 km) a day, and reached their 82° S depot on 5 November. They marked their route by a line of cairns, built of snow blocks, at three-mile intervals. On 17 November they reached the edge of the Barrier and faced the Transantarctic Mountains. Unlike Scott, who would be following the Beardmore Glacier route pioneered by Shackleton, Amundsen had to find his own route through the mountains. After probing the foothills for several days and climbing to around 1,500 feet (460 m), the party found what appeared to be a clear route, a steep glacier 30 nautical miles (56 km) long leading upwards to the plateau. Amundsen named this the Axel Heiberg Glacier, after one of his chief financial backers. (Note: Other features encountered in this area and roughly mapped for the first time were named by Amundsen and his companions, mostly after themselves and those that had backed the expedition. These features included: the Queen Maud Mountains, the Prince Olav Mountains, Mount Fridtjof Nansen, Mount Don Pedro Christophersen, Mount Wilhelm Christophersen, Mount Hanssen, Mount Wisting, Mount Hassel, Mount Bjaaland, Mount Engelstad, the Liv Glacier, and the Nilsen Plateau.) It was a harder ascent than the team had anticipated, made much longer by the need to take detours, and by the deep, soft snow. After three days of difficult climbing the party reached the glacier summit. Amundsen was full of praise for his dogs, and scorned the idea that they could not work in such conditions; on 21 November the party travelled 17 miles (27 km) and climbed 5,000 feet (1,500 m).

==== March to the pole ====
Upon reaching 10,600 feet (3,200 m) at the summit of the glacier, at 85° 36′ S, Amundsen prepared for the final stage of the journey. Of the 45 dogs who had made the ascent (7 had perished during the Barrier stage), only 18 would go forward; the remainder were to be killed for food. Each of the sledge-drivers killed dogs from his own team, skinned them, and divided the meat between dogs and men. "We called the place the Butchers' Shop", Amundsen recalled. "[T]here was depression and sadness in the air; we had grown so fond of our dogs". Regrets did not prevent the team from enjoying the plentiful food; Wisting proved particularly skillful in his preparation and presentation of the meat.

The party loaded up three sledges with supplies for a march of up to 60 days, leaving the remaining provisions and dog carcasses in a depot. Bad weather prevented their departure until 25 November, when they set off cautiously over the unknown ground in persistent fog. They were traveling over an icy surface broken by frequent crevasses, which together with the poor visibility slowed their progress. Amundsen called this area the "Devil's Glacier". On 4 December they came to an area where the crevasses were concealed under layers of snow and ice with a space between, which gave what Amundsen called an "unpleasantly hollow" sound as the party passed over it. He christened this area "The Devil's Ballroom". When later that day they emerged on to more solid ground, they had reached 87° S.

On 8 December the Norwegians passed Shackleton's Farthest South record of 88° 23′. As they neared the pole, they looked for any break in the landscape that might indicate another expedition had got there ahead of them. While camped on 12 December they were momentarily alarmed by a black object that appeared on the horizon, but this proved to be their own dogs' droppings off in the distance, magnified by mirage. Next day they camped at 89° 45′ S, 15 nautical miles (28 km) from the pole. On the following day, 14 December 1911, with the concurrence of his comrades Amundsen travelled in front of the sledges, and at around 3 pm the party reached the vicinity of the South Pole. They planted the Norwegian flag and named the polar plateau "King Haakon VII's Plateau". Amundsen later reflected on the irony of his achievement: "Never has a man achieved a goal so diametrically opposed to his wishes. The area around the North Pole—devil take it—had fascinated me since childhood, and now here I was at the South Pole. Could anything be more crazy?"

For the next three days the men worked to fix the exact position of the pole; after the conflicting and disputed claims of Cook and Peary in the north, Amundsen wanted to leave unmistakable markers for Scott. After taking several sextant readings at different times of day, Bjaaland, Wisting and Hassel skied out in different directions to "box" the pole; Amundsen reasoned that between them they would bracket the exact point. Finally the party pitched a tent, which they called Polheim, as near as possible to the actual pole as they could calculate by their observations. In the tent Amundsen left equipment for Scott, and a letter addressed to King Haakon which he requested Scott to deliver.

==== Return to Framheim ====
On 18 December, the party began the journey back to Framheim. Amundsen was determined to return to civilisation before Scott, and be first with the news. Nevertheless, he limited their daily distances to 15 nautical miles (28 km), to preserve the strength of dogs and men. In the 24-hour daylight the party travelled during the notional night, to keep the sun at their backs and thus reduce the danger of snow-blindness. Guided by the snow cairns built on their outward journey, they reached the Butchers' Shop on 4 January 1912, and began the descent to the Barrier. The men on skis "went whizzing down", but for the sledge drivers—Helmer Hanssen and Wisting—the descent was precarious; the sledges were hard to manoeuvre, and brakes were added to the runners to enable rapid stops when crevasses were encountered.

On 7 January, the party reached the first of their depots on the Barrier. Amundsen now felt their pace could be increased, and the men adopted a routine of travelling 15 nautical miles (28 km), stopping for six hours, then resuming the march. Under this regime they covered around 30 nautical miles (56 km) a day, and on 25 January, at 4 am, they reached Framheim. Of the 52 dogs that had started in October, 11 had survived, pulling 2 sledges. The journey to the pole and back had taken 99 days—10 fewer than scheduled—and they had covered about 1,860 nautical miles (3,440 km).

==== Informing the world ====
On his return to Framheim, Amundsen lost no time in winding up the expedition. After a farewell dinner in the hut, the party loaded the surviving dogs and the more valuable equipment aboard Fram, which departed the Bay of Whales late on 30 January 1912. The destination was Hobart in Tasmania. During the five-week voyage Amundsen prepared his telegrams and drafted the first report that he would give to the press. On 7 March, Fram reached Hobart, where Amundsen quickly learned there was as yet no news from Scott. He immediately sent telegrams to his brother Leon, to Nansen and to King Haakon, briefly informing them of his success. The next day he cabled the first full account of the story to London's Daily Chronicle, to which he had sold exclusive rights. Fram remained in Hobart for two weeks; while there she was joined by Douglas Mawson's ship Aurora, which was in service with the Australasian Antarctic Expedition. Amundsen presented them with a gift of his 11 surviving dogs.

=== Other expedition achievements ===
The Japanese Antarctic Expedition's ship Kainan Maru in the Bay of Whales, January 1912

==== Eastern party ====
On 8 November 1911, Prestrud, Stubberud and Johansen had departed for King Edward VII Land. The search for the point at which the solid ice of the Barrier became ice-covered land proved difficult. On 1 December the party had their first sighting of what was indubitably dry land, a nunatak which had been recorded by Scott during the Discovery expedition in 1902. After reaching this point they collected geological specimens and samples of mosses, and briefly explored their surroundings before returning to Framheim on 16 December. They were the first men to set foot on King Edward VII Land.

==== Fram and Kainan Maru ====
After leaving the Bay of Whales on 15 February 1911, Fram sailed for Buenos Aires where she arrived on 17 April. Here, Nilsen learned that the expedition's funds were exhausted; a sum supposedly set aside for the ship's needs had not materialised. Fortunately, Amundsen's friend Don Pedro Christopherson was at hand to fulfil his earlier promises to provide supplies and fuel. Fram departed in June for an oceanographic cruise between South America and Africa, which occupied the next three months. The ship returned to Buenos Aires in September for final refitting and re-provisioning, before sailing south on 5 October. Strong winds and stormy seas prolonged the voyage, but the ship arrived at the Bay of Whales on 9 January 1912. On 17 January the men in Framheim were surprised by the appearance of a second ship; it was the Kainan Maru, carrying the Japanese Antarctic Expedition led by Nobu Shirase. Communication between the two expeditions was limited by language difficulties, though the Norwegians gathered that the Japanese were heading for King Edward VII Land. Kainan Maru departed the next day, and on 26 January she landed a party on King Edward VII Land. This was the first landing on this shore from the sea; attempts by Discovery (1902), Nimrod (1908) and Terra Nova (1911) had all failed.

== Aftermath ==
=== Contemporary reactions ===
Clements Markham, the distinguished British geographer, was a harsh critic of Amundsen's change of plan and expressed private doubts about his success.

In Hobart, Amundsen received congratulatory telegrams from, among others, former U.S. President Theodore Roosevelt and King George V of the United Kingdom. The King expressed particular pleasure that Amundsen's first port of call on his return had been on soil of the British Empire. In Norway, which only six years earlier had become an independent country after 500 years of Danish and Swedish supremacy, the news was proclaimed in banner headlines, and the national flag was flown throughout the country. All the expedition's participants received the Norwegian South Pole Medal (Sydpolsmedaljen), established by King Haakon to commemorate the expedition. However, Amundsen's biographer Roland Huntford refers to "the chill underneath the cheers"; there remained a residue of unease over Amundsen's tactics. One Norwegian newspaper expressed relief that Amundsen had found a new route, and had not intruded on Scott's path from McMurdo Sound.

In Britain, press reaction to Amundsen's victory was restrained but generally positive. Apart from the enthusiastic reports in the Daily Chronicle and The Illustrated London News—which each had a financial stake in Amundsen's success—the Manchester Guardian remarked that any cause for reproach was wiped out by the Norwegians' courage and determination. Readers of Young England were exhorted not to grudge "the brave Norseman" the honour he had earned, and The Boy's Own Paper suggested that every British boy should read Amundsen's expedition account. The Times correspondent offered a mild rebuke to Amundsen for his failure to inform Scott until it was too late for the latter to respond, "all the more unnecessary, for no one would have welcomed co-operation in the work of South Polar exploration more than Captain Scott ... Still, no one who knows Captain Amundsen can have any doubt of his integrity, and since he states he has reached the Pole we are bound to believe him".

Senior figures at the RGS expressed more hostile sentiments, at least privately. To them, Amundsen's feat was the result of "a dirty trick". Markham hinted that Amundsen's claim might be fraudulent: "We must wait for the truth until the return of the Terra Nova". When later in 1912 Amundsen addressed the RGS he felt slighted after Lord Curzon, the Society's president, jocularly called for "three cheers for the dogs". Shackleton did not join in denigrating Amundsen's victory, and called him "perhaps the greatest polar explorer of today". Before she heard the news of her husband's death, Kathleen Scott conceded that Amundsen's journey "was a very fine feat ... in spite of one's irritation one has to admire it".

=== Scott tragedy ===
Map showing the polar journeys of the Scott's Terra Nova expedition (green) and Amundsen's expedition (red) to reach the South Pole

Amundsen left Hobart to undertake a lecture tour of Australia and New Zealand. He then went to Buenos Aires where he finished writing his expedition account. Back in Norway he supervised the publication of the book, then visited Britain before embarking on a long lecture tour of the United States. In February 1913, while in Madison, Wisconsin, he received the news that Scott and four comrades had reached the pole on 17 January 1912, but had all perished by 29 March, during their return journey. The bodies of Scott, Wilson and Bowers had been discovered in November 1912, after the end of the Antarctic winter. In his initial response, Amundsen called the news "Horrible, horrible". His more formal tribute followed: "Captain Scott left a record, for honesty, for sincerity, for bravery, for everything that makes a man".

According to Huntford, the news of Scott's death meant that "Amundsen the victor was eclipsed ... by Scott the martyr". In the United Kingdom a myth quickly developed in which Scott was portrayed as one who had behaved nobly and played the game fairly. He had been defeated because, by contrast, Amundsen was a mere glory-seeker who had concealed his true intentions, had used dogs rather than relying on honest man-hauling and had slaughtered these same dogs for food. Furthermore, he was considered a "professional" which, in the mindset of upper-class Britain of that time, diminished anything he might have accomplished. This narrative was heavily reinforced with the publication of Scott's journals and his "Message to the Public". Huntford points out that "[Scott's] literary talent was his trump. It was as if he had reached out from his buried tent and taken revenge." Even so, among explorers Amundsen's name continued to be respected. In his account of the Terra Nova expedition written a few years later, Scott's comrade Apsley Cherry-Garrard wrote that the primary reason for Amundsen's success was "the very remarkable qualities of the man", specifically his courage in choosing to discover a new route rather than follow the known path.

=== Historical perspective ===
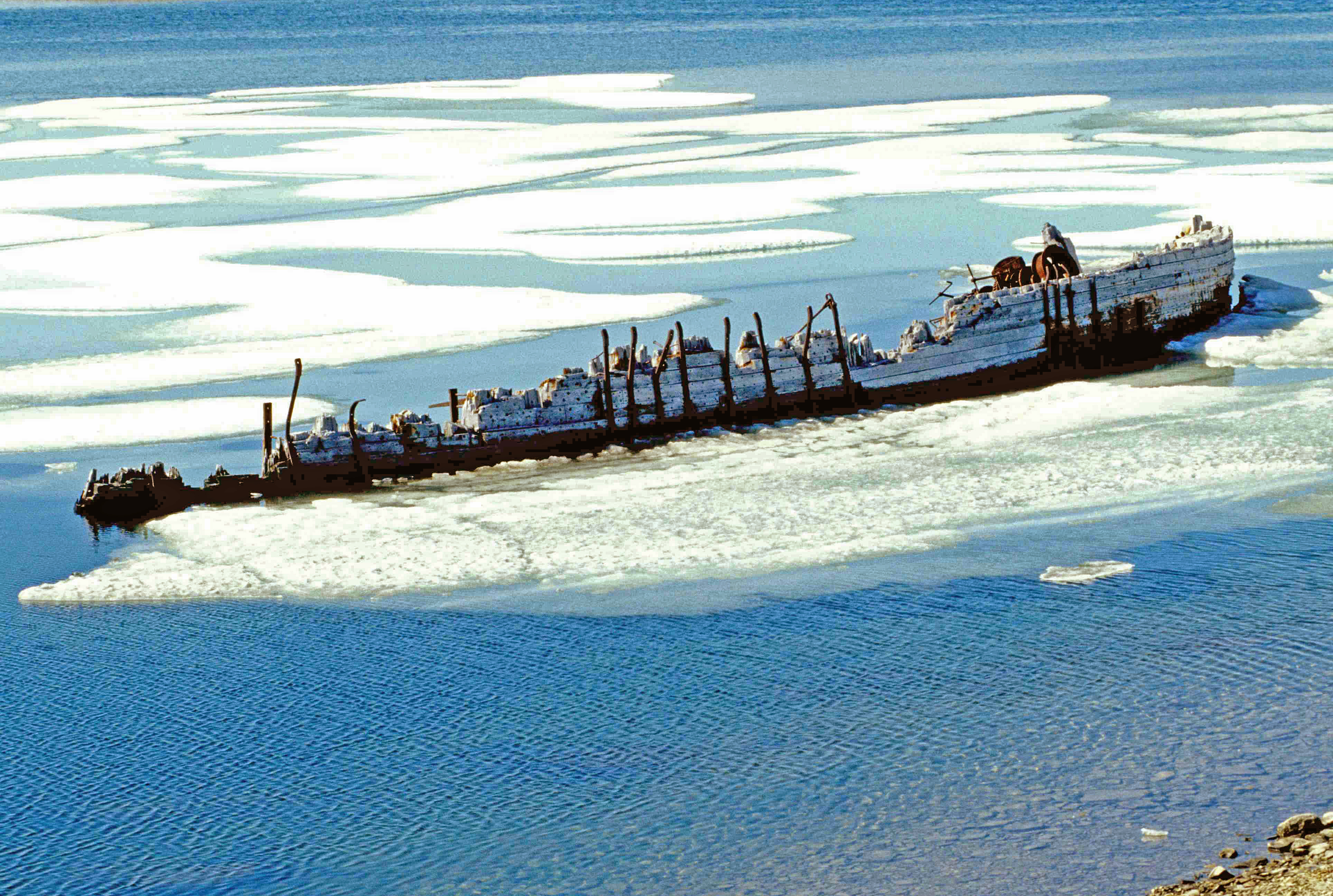
Remains of Amundsen's last ship, Maud, in Cambridge Bay, Nunavut, Canada

The outbreak of the First World War in 1914 delayed the start of Amundsen's northern polar drift—to which the South Pole expedition had been intended as a preliminary—until July 1918. He then set off in a specially constructed vessel, Maud, which remained in Arctic waters for the next seven years. The ship did not drift over the North Pole, although in the course of the expedition it became the fourth ship to traverse the North-East Passage, after Nordenskiöld's Vega and the Russian icebreakers Taymyr and Vaygach. Amundsen left the expedition in 1923; the remaining years of his life were largely devoted to polar exploration by air. On 12 May 1926, aboard the airship Norge with Lincoln Ellsworth and Umberto Nobile, Amundsen flew over the North Pole. He and Wisting, also on the airship, were the first men to see both poles. In 1928, while attempting to rescue a later Nobile expedition, Amundsen disappeared with his aircraft in the seas between Norway and Spitsbergen.

The four men who had stood at the pole with Amundsen were all asked to accompany their leader on the Maud drift. Bjaaland and Hassel declined; neither participated in any further polar ventures. Helmer Hanssen and Wisting both joined Maud; the latter took over the leadership when Amundsen left the expedition. In 1936 Wisting captained Fram on the ship's final voyage to Oslo, where it became a museum. Johansen, who had been unable to settle back into normal life on his return from Antarctica, became withdrawn and uncommunicative. He refused to discuss his experiences or his dispute with Amundsen, and retreated into a life of depression and poverty. On 4 January 1913 he shot himself in his Oslo lodgings.

The Scott myth lasted until the final quarter of the 20th century, when it was replaced by one that characterised him as a "heroic bungler" whose failure was largely the result of his own mistakes. This portrayal, the cultural historian Stephanie Barczewski asserts, is as fallacious as the earlier one in which he was considered beyond criticism. In the early 21st century, writers have suggested more reasoned explanations for the Scott tragedy than his incompetence, and his reputation has to some extent been rescued. The renewed spotlight on Scott has also highlighted Amundsen's achievements: Barczewski writes that "Amundsen and his men reached the pole due to a combination of superb planning, long experience with sledge-dogs and skis and impressive physical stamina". In her account of Scott's expedition, Diana Preston is equally specific in identifying the basis of Amundsen's success. He was focused on the single goal of reaching the pole, whereas Scott had to reconcile the competing claims of geographical exploration and scientific knowledge. "A practical and experienced professional, [Amundsen] planned carefully and applied all the lessons he had learned in the Arctic ... [H]e relied exclusively on the well-tried means of transport and unsentimentally exploited their food potential. He was similarly efficient and unsentimental in his management of his men". The United States' scientific base at the South Pole, founded in 1957, is named the Amundsen–Scott South Pole Station, to honour the memories of both polar pioneers.

=== Modern research ===
In a paper published 100 years after the Amundsen expedition, researchers claimed that the tent and flags are buried under 17 m (56 ft) of ice and about a minute of latitude north of the South Pole, or about one nautical mile.

== Sources ==
=== Books ===
- Amundsen, Roald; Nilsen, Thorvald; Prestrud, Kristian (1976) [1912]. The South Pole: An Account of the Norwegian expedition in the Fram, 1910–12 (Volumes I and II). Translated by Chater, A.G. London: C. Hurst & Company. ISBN 0-903983-47-8. First published in 1912 by John Murray, London.
- Barczewski, Stephanie (2007). Antarctic Destinies: Scott, Shackleton and the Changing Face of Heroism. London and New York: Hambledon Continuum. ISBN 978-1-84725-192-3.
- Cherry-Garrard, Apsley (1970) [1922]. The Worst Journey in the World. London: Penguin Books. ISBN 0-14-009501-2. First published in 1922 by Chatto and Windus, London.
- Crane, David (2005). Scott of the Antarctic. London: HarperCollins. ISBN 978-0-00-715068-7.
- Fairley, T.C. (1959). Sverdrup's Arctic Adventures. London: Longmans. OCLC 732299190.
- Fleming, Fergus (2002). Ninety Degrees North. London: Granta Books. ISBN 1-86207-535-2.
- Hamre, Ivar (November 1933). "The Japanese South Polar Expedition of 1911–1912: A Little-Known Episode in Antarctic Exploration". The Geographical Journal. 82 (5): 411–423. Bibcode:1933GeogJ..82..411H. doi:10.2307/1786962. JSTOR 1786962. (subscription required)
- Herbert, Wally (1989). The Noose of Laurels. London: Hodder & Stoughton. ISBN 0-340-41276-3.
- Huntford, Roland (1979). Scott and Amundsen. London: Hodder and Stoughton. ISBN 0-340-19565-7.
- Huntford, Roland (1985). The Last Place on Earth. London and Sydney: Pan Books. ISBN 0-330-28816-4.
- Huntford, Roland (1985). Shackleton. London: Hodder & Stoughton. ISBN 0-340-25007-0.
- Huntford, Roland (2001). Nansen. London: Abacus. ISBN 0-349-11492-7.
- Jones, Max (2003). The Last Great Quest. Oxford (UK): Oxford University Press. ISBN 0-19-280483-9.
- Langner, Rainer-K. (2007). Scott and Amundsen: Duel in the Ice. Translated by Beech, Timothy. London: Haus Publishing. ISBN 978-1-905791-08-8.
- MacPhee, Ross (2010). Race to the end: Amundsen, Scott, and the attainment of the South Pole. New York and London: Sterling Innovation. ISBN 978-1-4027-7029-6.
- Maxtone-Graham, John (2000). Safe Return Doubtful: The Heroic Age of Polar Exploration. London: Constable. ISBN 0-09-480330-7.
- Nansen, Fridtjof (1897). Farthest North, Volume I. London: Archibald Constable & Co. OCLC 499726131.
- Pickman, Sarah (2017). "Dress, Image, and Cultural Encounter in the Heroic Age of Polar Expedition". In Mears, Patricia (ed.). Expedition: Fashion From the Extreme. Fashion Institute of Technology. New York City: Thames & Hudson. pp. 31–56. ISBN 978-0-500-51997-4. OCLC 975365990.
- Preston, Diana (1999). A First Rate Tragedy. London: Constable. ISBN 0-09-479530-4.
- Riffenburgh, Beau (2005). "Nimrod": the Extraordinary Story of Shackleton's First Expedition. London: Bloomsbury Publishing. ISBN 0-7475-7253-4.
- Scott, J.M. (1971). Fridtjof Nansen. Sheridan, Oregon: Heron Books. OCLC 143929.
- Solomon, Susan (2001). The Coldest March: Scott's Fatal Antarctic Expedition. New Haven, Connecticut: Yale University Press. ISBN 0-300-09921-5.
- Turley, Charles (1935). Roald Amundsen, explorer. London: Methuen. OCLC 3331281.

=== Online ===
- "Amundsen Would Compare" (PDF). The New York Times. 8 September 1909.
- "Amundsen-Scott South Pole Station". Office of Polar Programs. National Science Foundation. 27 April 2009.
- Barr, William (1985). "Aleksandr Stepanovich Kuchin: The Russian who went South with Amundsen". Polar Record. 22 (139). Cambridge University Press: 401–412. Bibcode:1985PoRec..22..401B. doi:10.1017/S0032247400005647. S2CID 131293842.
- "Captain Amundsen's Achievement. Work of Previous Explorers". The Times. London. 9 March 1912. p. 5. (subscription required)
- Rees, Jasper (19 December 2004). "Ice in our Hearts". The Daily Telegraph. London.
- "The Polar Ship Fram". The Fram Museum. Archived from the original on 10 October 2011.
- "Sverre Helge Hassel". The Fram Museum. Archived from the original on 14 September 2015. (in Norwegian)
- "Oscar Wisting". The Fram Museum. Archived from the original on 16 September 2011. (in Norwegian)
- Weinstock, John. "Sondre Norheim: Folk Hero to Immigrant". The Norwegian-American Historical Association. Archived from the original on 12 April 2020.
- "Sydpolsmedaljen". Store Norske Leksikon. (in Norwegian)
