= Amundsen Coast =

Segment of Antarctic coast

Coordinates: 85°30′S 162°0′W

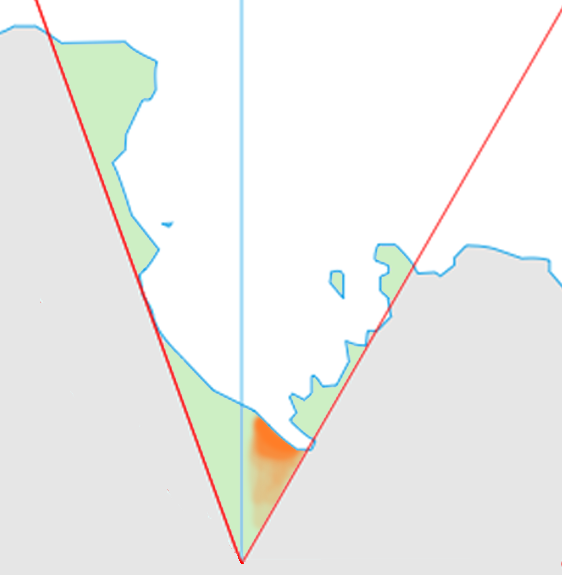
Location of Amundsen Coast (marked in orange) within the Ross Dependency

Amundsen Coast is a portion of the coast to the south of the Ross Ice Shelf lying between Morris Peak, on the east side of Liv Glacier, and the west side of the Scott Glacier. Named by New Zealand Antarctic Place-Names Committee in 1961 for Captain Roald Amundsen, the Norwegian explorer who led his own expedition in 1910–12 to the Antarctic. Setting up a base at Framheim at the edge of the Ross Ice Shelf, he sledged southward across the shelf and discovered a route up the Axel Heiberg Glacier along this coast to reach the polar plateau. He was the first to reach the South Pole, doing so on December 14, 1911.
