= Wishbone Ridge =

Wishbone Ridge may refer to:

- Wishbone Ridge along the Wishbone scarp, a large undersea feature of the South Pacific Ocean.
- Wishbone Ridge (Antarctica), a Y-shaped ridge trending northeast from the main ridge of the Duncan Mountains in Antarctica.
