= Strom Glacier =

Glacier in Antarctica

- Location within Antarctica
- Type: Valley glacier
- Location: Queen Maud Mountains, Antarctica
- Coordinates: 85°10′S 164°30′W
- Length: 56 km (35 mi)
- Terminus: Ross Ice Shelf

Strom Glacier (85°10′S 164°30′W) is a steep valley glacier flowing northeast from the north side of Mount Fridtjof Nansen to the head of the Ross Ice Shelf, flanked on the northwest by the Duncan Mountains and on the southeast by the Herbert Range.

== Name ==
The glacier derives its name from "Strom Camp" near its foot, occupied during December 1929 by the Byrd Antarctic Expedition geological party under Gould. Strom Camp was named by that party for Sverre Strom, first mate of the ship City of New York, who remained ashore as a member of the winter party and headed the snowmobile party which hauled supplies in support of the two field parties.

== Route ==
The Strom Glacier forms to the north of the Herbert Range. Webster Knob is above its head, at the end of Barracouta Ridge. It flows northeast past the Duncan Mountains to its north. The Cohen Glacier enters the Strom Glacier from its right. The Strom Glacier passes LaForrest Rock to its west before entering the Ross Ice Shelf to the northwest of the Axel Heiberg Glacier.

== Features ==
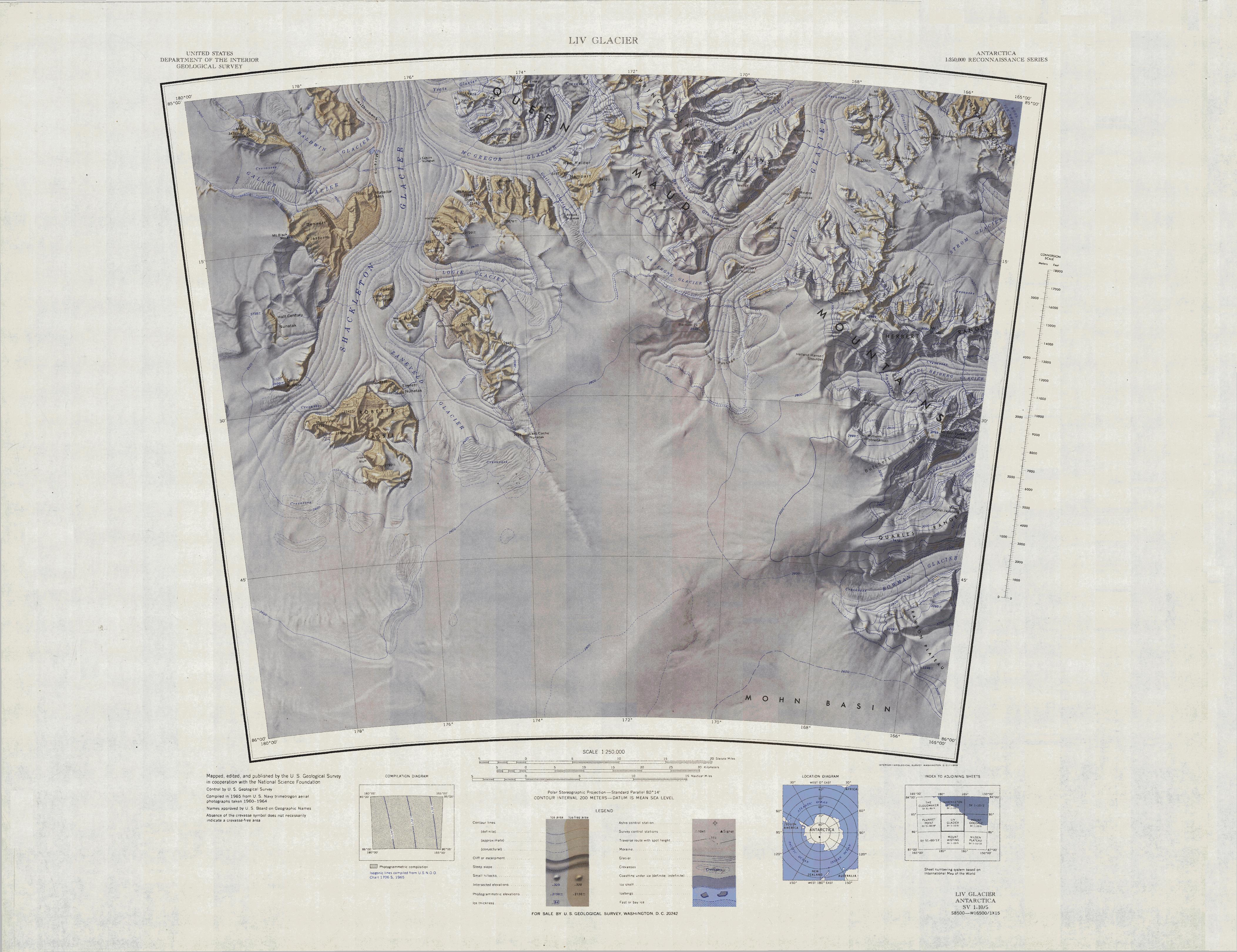
Upper section of the glacier (center, east)

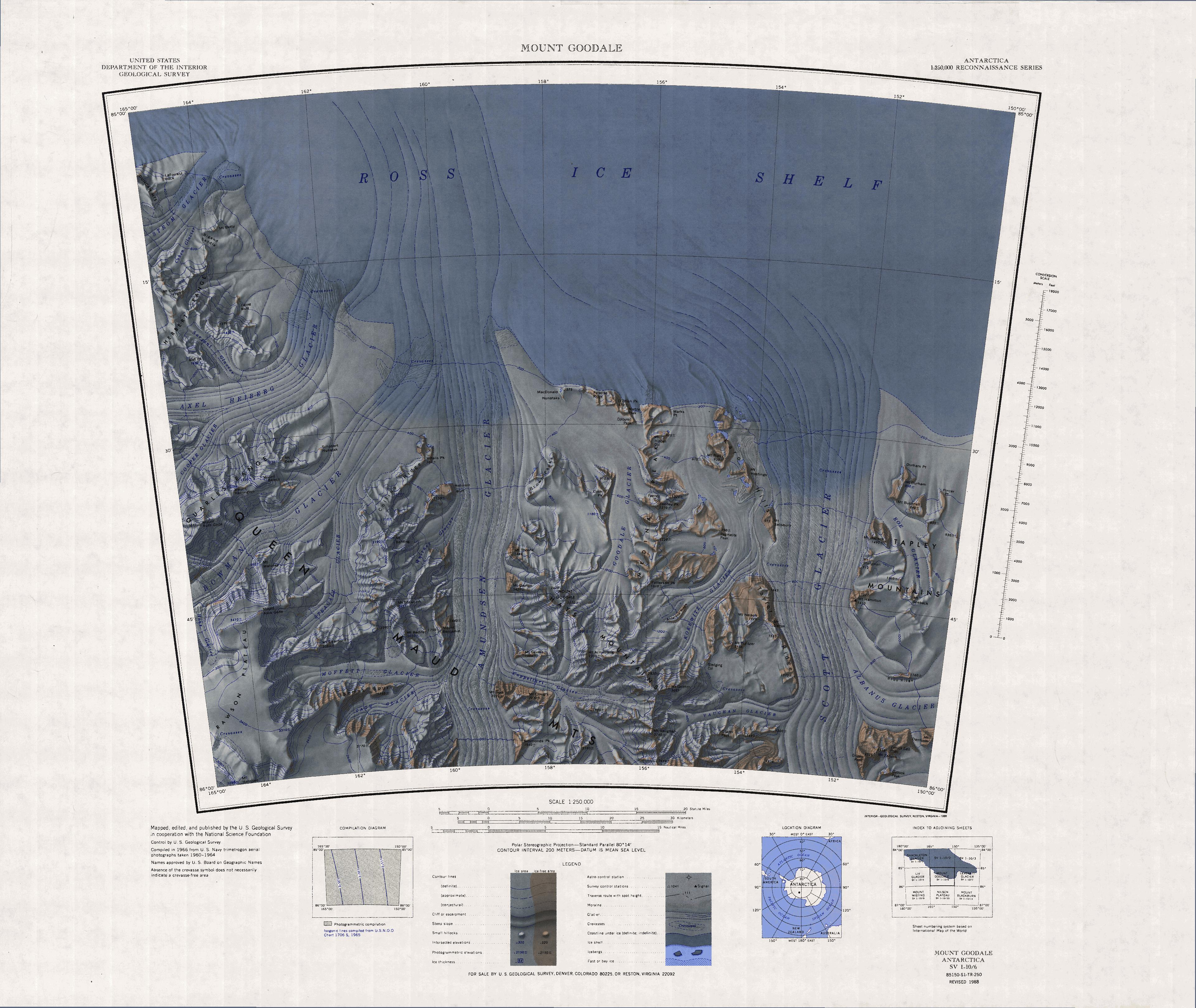
Lower section of the glacier (center, west)

=== Webster Knob ===
85°18′S 166°30′W. A prominent rock knob at the head of Strom Glacier. It stands near the extremity of a spur which descends from the northeast shoulder of Mount Fridtjof Nansen. Discovered and visited in November 1929 by the Byrd Antarctic Expedition geological party under Laurence Gould. Named by Byrd for Mrs. Laurence J. Webster, a contributor to the expedition.

=== Cohen Glacier ===
85°12′S 164°15′W. A small glacier draining northward from Mount Cohen of the Herbert Range to enter Strom Glacier near the head of Ross Ice Shelf. Named by the Southern Party of the New Zealand Geological Survey Antarctic Expedition, 1963-64, in association with Mount Cohen.

== Sources ==
- Alberts, Fred G., ed. (1995), Geographic Names of the Antarctic (PDF) (2 ed.), United States Board on Geographic Names This article incorporates public domain material from websites or documents of the United States Board on Geographic Names.
- Liv Glacier, USGS: United States Geological Survey
- Mount Goodale, USGS: United States Geological Survey

This article incorporates public domain material from websites or documents of the United States Geological Survey.
