= Thorvald Nilsen =

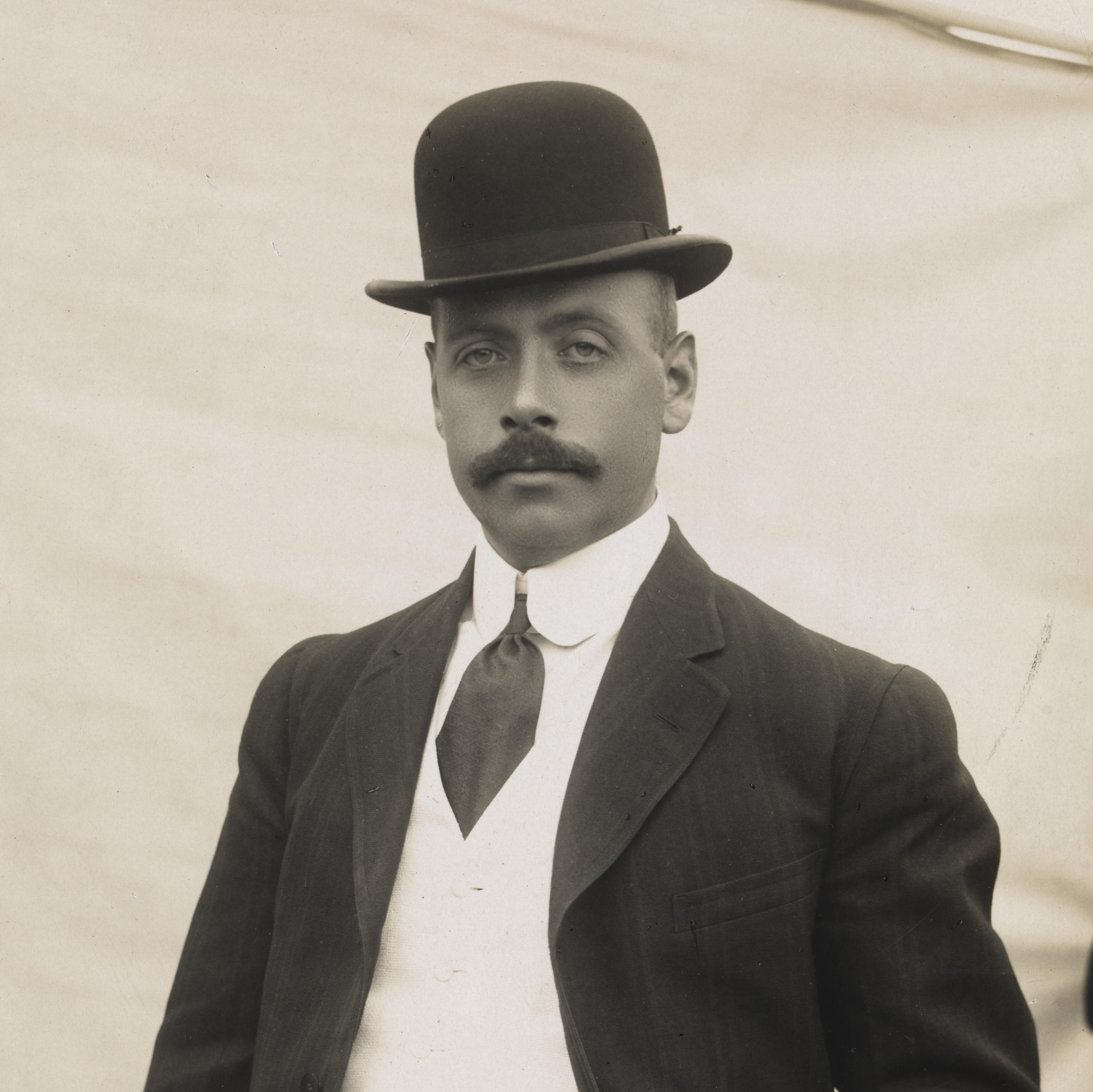
- Born: 6 August 1881; Kristiansand, Norway
- Died: 19 April 1940 (aged 58); Buenos Aires, Argentina
- Occupations: naval officer and polar explorer
- Known for: Amundsen's South Pole expedition
- Awards: Knight, First Class of the Order of St. Olav

Thorvald Nilsen (6 August 1881 – 19 April 1940) was captain of the polar ship, the Fram and deputy commander during Roald Amundsen's expedition to Antarctica (1910–12). While Amundsen conquered the South Pole, the Fram was used for oceanographic observations in the South Atlantic.

Nilsen had education and practice both from the navy and from the merchant navy on routes to South America when he applied in 1909 and got the position as master of Roald Amundsen's planned North Pole expedition with the Fram. He was, of course, among the first to receive the message that the journey should go to the South Pole instead.

The Fram sailed from Nilsen's hometown Kristiansand on 9 August 1910. The Bay of Whales in Antarctica was reached on 13 January 1911, and the winters were put ashore. Reached 78 ° 41 's.br. deepest in the bay and thus became the ship that had been both the farthest north and the farthest south in the world. On 14 February, they left Whale Bay and arrived in Buenos Aires on 19 April. At the request of Fridtjof Nansen, oceanographic measurements and observations were now to be made in the relatively unexplored southern Atlantic Ocean. Nilsen discovered that nothing had been arranged for this part of the expedition, but the financial problems were solved with the help of the relocated Norwegian businessman Don Pedro Christophersen. With the young Russian oceanographer Alexander Kuchin as scientific leader, oceanographic measurements were carried out across the South Atlantic for the first time. The results were good in terms of water samples, temperature measurements, plankton samples etc.

Amundsen and the others were picked up in January 1912, and on 7 March, the Fram arrived in Hobart, Tasmania. On 23 May, Nilsen and the Fram were back in Buenos Aires. They had then sailed twice around the Earth, bypassed Antarctica and traveled 54,400 nautical miles. The intention was now to embark on the North Pole voyage, and Nilsen stayed in Buenos Aires to take care of the equipment and the reparation of the Fram. It has been claimed that he had a close relationship with Don Pedro's daughter Carmenzia, but Nilsen's reserved nature and a certain "difference in status" may indicate that this was not the case. In December 1912 he was back in Norway without both Carmenzia and the Fram.

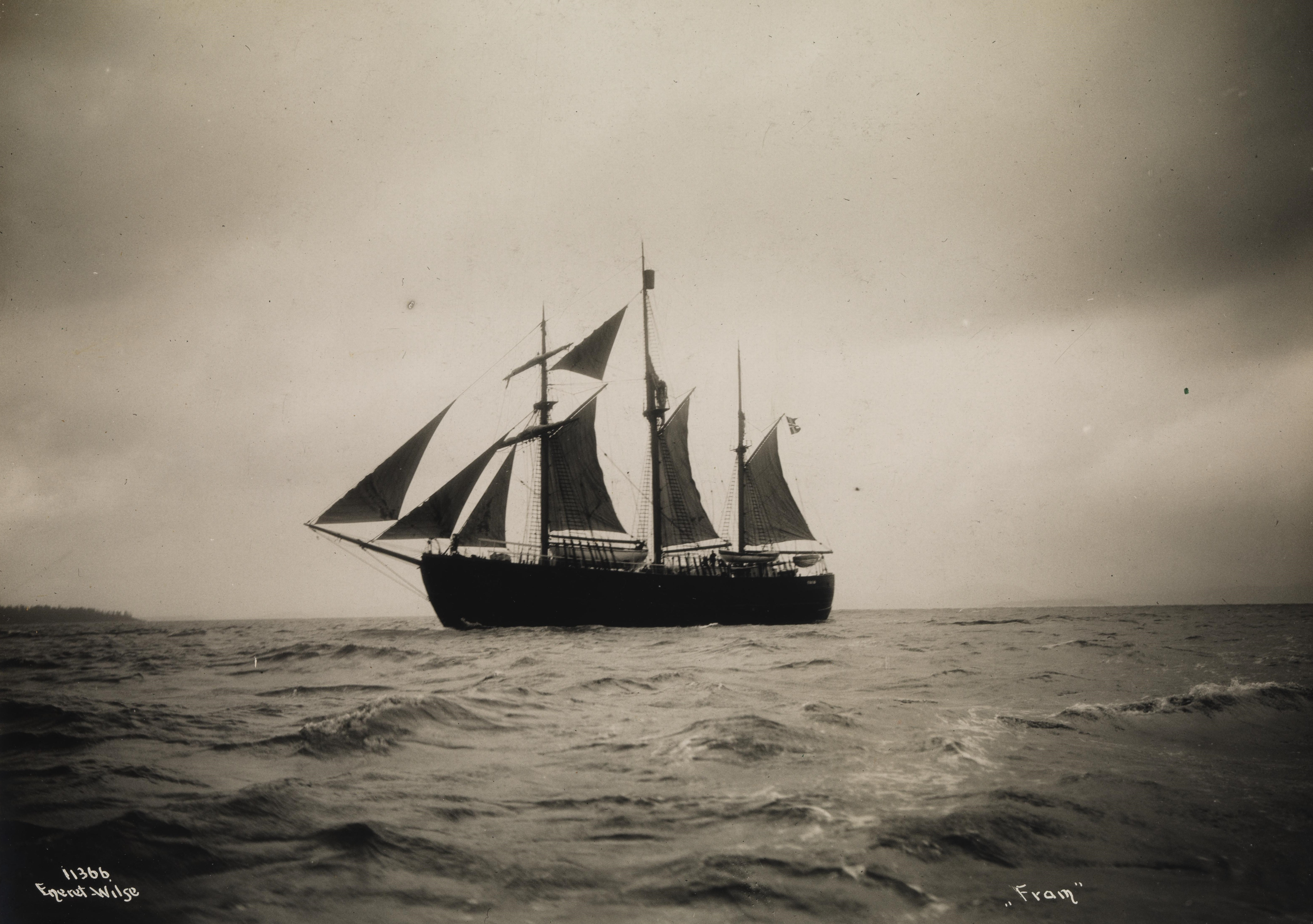
The Fram (25 April 1910)

In the autumn of 1913, Nilsen and the Fram's crew returned to Buenos Aires, because now the plan for the Fram was to be the first ship through the new Panama Canal. Nilsen took over command on 3 October in Colón, where they remained for two months while the canal was to be completed. When that did not happen, it was decided to tow the Fram around South America. On 25 March 1914, they had come no further than Montevideo. Conditions on board had become very difficult after the long stay in warm waters. Both the ship and the provisions were attacked by land, and the prospect of a long voyage in the Arctic was poor. The Fram was ordered back to Norway and arrived in Horten in the midsummer of 1914.

Nilsen served as torpedo boat commander in neutrality service during the war 1914–18 and was then appointed adjutant at the 2nd Naval District Command in Kristiansand. In 1918 he married Frida Lem from Selje, and two years later he took the dispatch exam. The couple moved to Buenos Aires for well over 1920, after Nilsen had been offered a position in the company “John M. Bugge Assuranse- og Dispachørforretning” as a casualty agent for Nordic companies. The two had talked about this already in 1915, and Nilsen took over the company after Bugge's death.

Thorvald Nilsen became a held member of the Scandinavian colony in Buenos Aires and was chairman of the Norwegian La Plata Society 1925–27. For his efforts during the Antarctic expedition, he was appointed a knight of the 1st class of the Order of St. Olav in 1913, and he was a knight of the French Legion of Honor. He loved Norway and visited his homeland often before he died in Buenos Aires in 1940.

== In popular culture ==
Nilsen was portrayed by Nils Ole Oftebro in the 1985 Central Television serial The Last Place on Earth.
