= Duncan Mountains =

Coastal foothills in Ross Dependency, Antarctica

- Location within Antarctica

Dimensions
- Length: 18 nautical miles (33 km)

Geography
- Continent: Antarctica
- Region: Ross Dependency
- Range coordinates: 85°2′S 166°0′W

Climbing
- First ascent: Byrd Antarctic Expedition (1929)

The Duncan Mountains (85°2′S 166°0′W) are a group of rugged coastal foothills, about 18 nautical miles (33 km; 21 mi) long, extending from the mouth of Liv Glacier to the mouth of Strom Glacier at the head of the Ross Ice Shelf in Antarctica.

== Discovery and naming ==
The Duncan Mountains were discovered by the Byrd Antarctic Expedition in November 1929 and named for James Duncan, the Manager of Tapley Ltd, shipping agents for the Byrd expeditions at Dunedin, New Zealand.

== Location ==
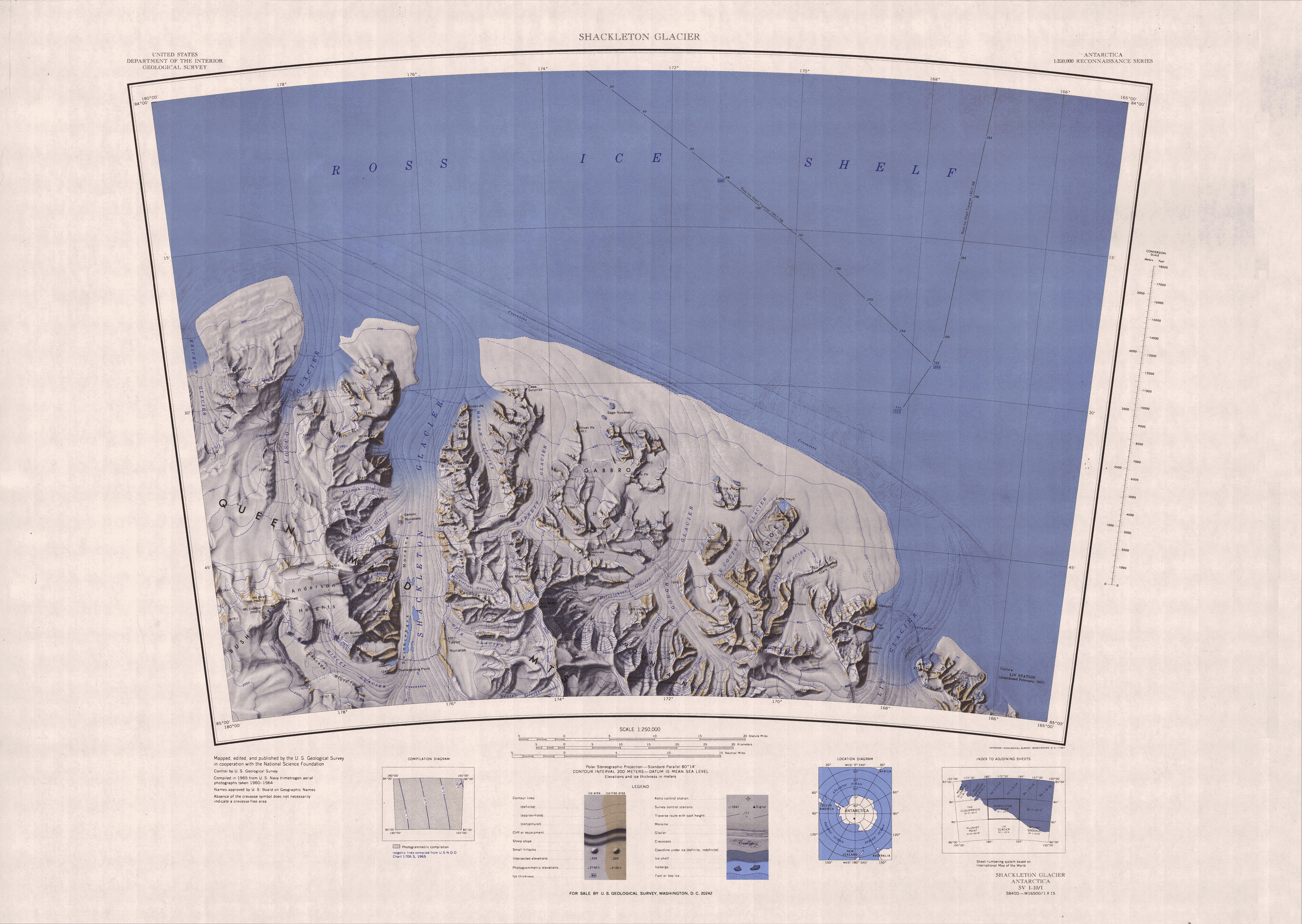
Duncan Mountains to the southeast

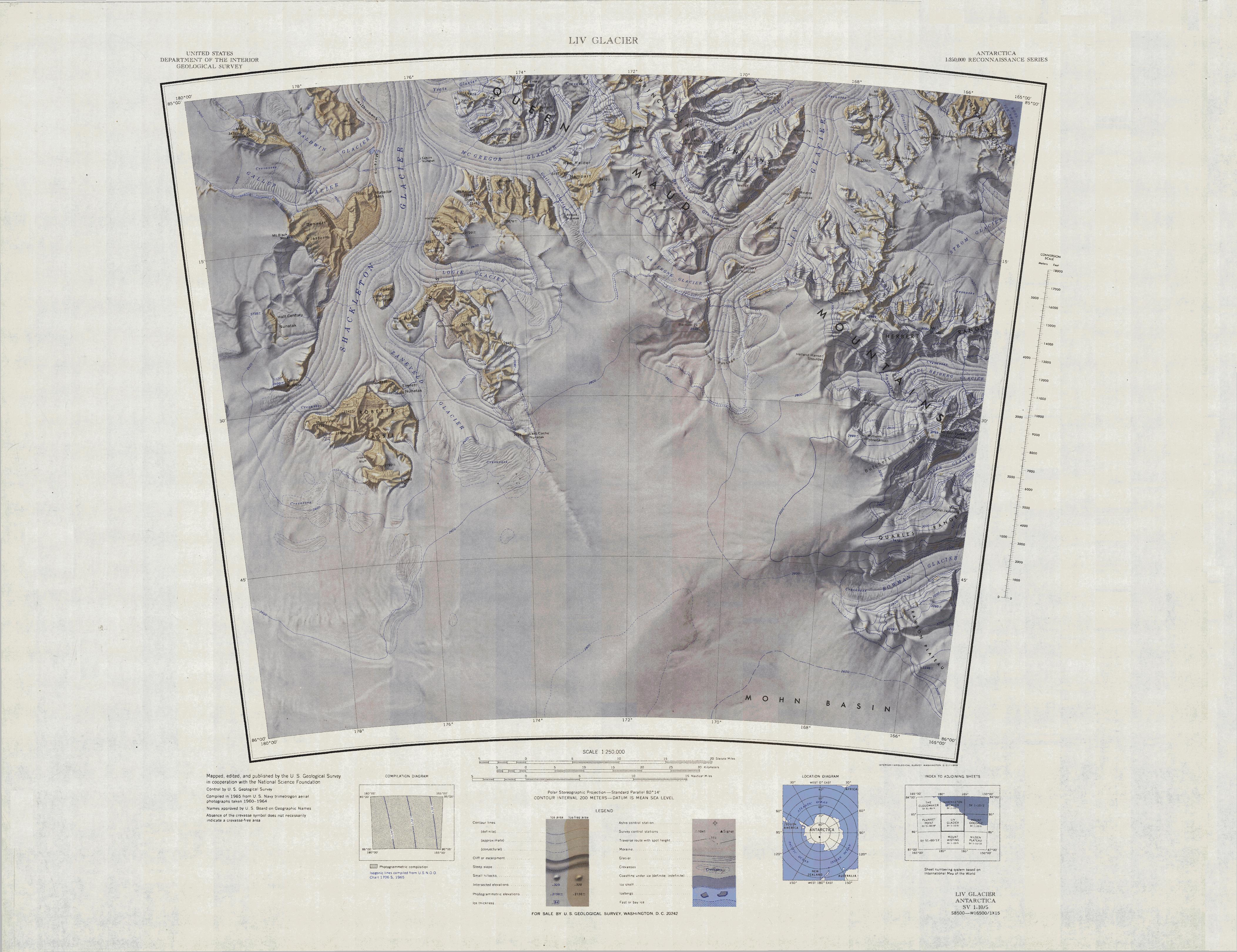
Duncan Mountains to the northeast

According to Sailing Directions for Antarctica (1960), "Duncan Mountains (James Duncan Mountains) lie along the 85th parallel between 165° W and 168° W. These conspicuous foothills are marked by a series of ragged peaks rising to about 4,800 feet, eroded by many cirques and with small glaciers descending from the slopes."

The northernmost point of the Duncan Mountains is Morris Peak, just east of the point where the Liv Glacier enters the Ross Ice Shelf. The Somero Glacier flows to the northwest of the Duncan Mountains to enter the Liv Glacier just before its mouth. The mountains extend southeast along the coast to the mouth of the Strom Glacier. LaForrest Rock is the furthest point in the east, at the mouth of Strom Glacier. To the west of the Duncan Mountains, between them and the Liv Glacier, are Mount Fairweather, Mount Schevill, Mount Johnstone and Mount Blood. The Herbert Range is to the south.

== Features ==
=== Spillway Icefall ===
85°01′S 166°22′W. A spectacular icefall descending northward through the central Duncan Mountains to the Amundsen Coast. The icefall cascades through the mountains giving the appearance of a turbulent spillway on a dam. The descriptive name was approved by United States Advisory Committee on Antarctic Names (US-ACAN) from a proposal by Edmund Stump, geologist, Arizona State University, who worked in this area, 1974–75.

=== Morris Peak ===
84°56′S 167°22′W. A prominent peak, 910 metres (2,990 ft) high, marking the northwest end of the Duncan Mountains, at the east side of the mouth of Liv Glacier where the latter enters Ross Ice Shelf. Named by US-ACAN for Lieutenant Commander H.C. Morris, United States Navy, commanding officer of the USS Mills during Operation Deep Freeze 1963.

=== LaForrest Rock ===
85°06′S 164°32′W. A rock outcrop 1.5 nautical miles (2.8 km; 1.7 mi) west of the mouth of Strom Glacier, along the low, ice-covered north slopes of the Duncan Mountains. This area was first explored and mapped by the Byrd Antarctic Expedition, 1928–30. Named by the US-ACAN for B.A. LaForrest, a storekeeper on the United States Navy Operation Deep Freeze, 1966.

=== Mount Corbató ===
85°04′S 165°42′W. A peak 1,730 metres (5,680 ft) high, located 4.5 nautical miles (8.3 km; 5.2 mi) east of Mount Fairweather in the Duncan Mountains. The peak was geologically mapped on January 13, 1975, by the United States Antarctic Research Program (USARP) Ohio State University field party. Named by US-ACAN for Charles E. Corbató, geologist with the party.

=== Banded Peak ===
85°03′S 166°05′W. A small peak which rises over 1,400 metres (4,600 ft) high in the Duncan Mountains. This feature which stands 3 nautical miles (5.6 km; 3.5 mi) northeast of Mount Fairweather has a distinctive snow band across the south face. Named by the Southern Party of New Zealand Geological Survey Antarctic Expedition (NZGSAE), 1963–64.

=== Pegmatite Point ===
85°01′S 165°20′W. A distinctively banded point which juts into the head of Ross Ice Shelf from the Duncan Mountains. The point is 7 nautical miles (13 km; 8.1 mi) east-northeast of Mount Fairweather. It was first roughly plotted from ground surveys and aerial photographs by the Byrd Antarctic Expedition, 1928–30. The Southern Party of NZGSAE, 1963–64, visited the point and gave the name because of the abundance of the rock Pegmatite.

=== Wishbone Ridge ===
84°56′S 166°56′W. A Y-shaped ridge trending northeast from the main ridge of the Duncan Mountains. The feature is 2 nautical miles (3.7 km; 2.3 mi) east of Morris Peak and is unique among the series of ridges in the Duncan Mountains in that it bifurcates, giving an aerial view similar in shape to a "wishbone." The descriptive name was suggested by Edmund Stump of the USARP Ohio State University field party who, with C.E. Corbató and P.V. Colbert, geologically mapped the ridge on December 21, 1974.

== Nearby features ==
=== Mount Fairweather ===
85°04′S 166°32′W. A prominent mountain, 1,865 metres (6,119 ft) high, standing at the head of Somero Glacier, 4 nautical miles (7.4 km; 4.6 mi) northeast of Mount Schevill. So named by the Southern Party of the NZGSAE (1963–64), which experienced a spell of unusually fine weather while in the vicinity of this peak.

=== Mount Schevill ===
85°07′S 167°12′W. A conspicuous mountain, 1,995 metres (6,545 ft) high, overlooking the head of Somero Glacier, about 5 nautical miles (9.3 km; 5.8 mi) southeast of Mount Johnstone. Named by US-ACAN for William E. Schevill, USARP biologist at McMurdo Station, 1964–65.

=== Mount Johnstone ===
85°03′S 167°45′W. A mountain, 1,230 metres (4,040 ft) high, standing at the east side of Liv Glacier, about 2.5 nautical miles (4.6 km; 2.9 mi) southwest of Mount Blood. Named by US-ACAN for C. Raymond Johnstone, USARP logistics officer at McMurdo Station, winter 1965.

=== Mount Blood ===
85°01′S 167°30′W. A mountain at the south side of the mouth of Somero Glacier, 2.5 nautical miles (4.6 km; 2.9 mi) northeast of Mount Johnstone. Named by US-ACAN for Richard H. Blood, USARP ionospheric physicist at the South Pole Station, winter 1965.

== Sources ==
- Alberts, Fred G., ed. (1995), Geographic Names of the Antarctic (PDF) (2 ed.), United States Board on Geographic Names This article incorporates public domain material from websites or documents of the United States Board on Geographic Names.
- Liv Glacier, USGS: United States Geological Survey
- Mount Goodale, USGS: United States Geological Survey
- Sailing Directions for Antarctica: Including the Off-Lying Islands South of Latitude 60 Degrees S. (2 ed.), United States. Hydrographic Office, 1960 This article incorporates public domain material from websites or documents of the United States Hydrographic Office.
- Shackleton Glacier, USGS: United States Geological Survey
- This article incorporates public domain material from websites or documents of the United States Geological Survey.
