= Herbert Range =

Mountain range in Antarctica

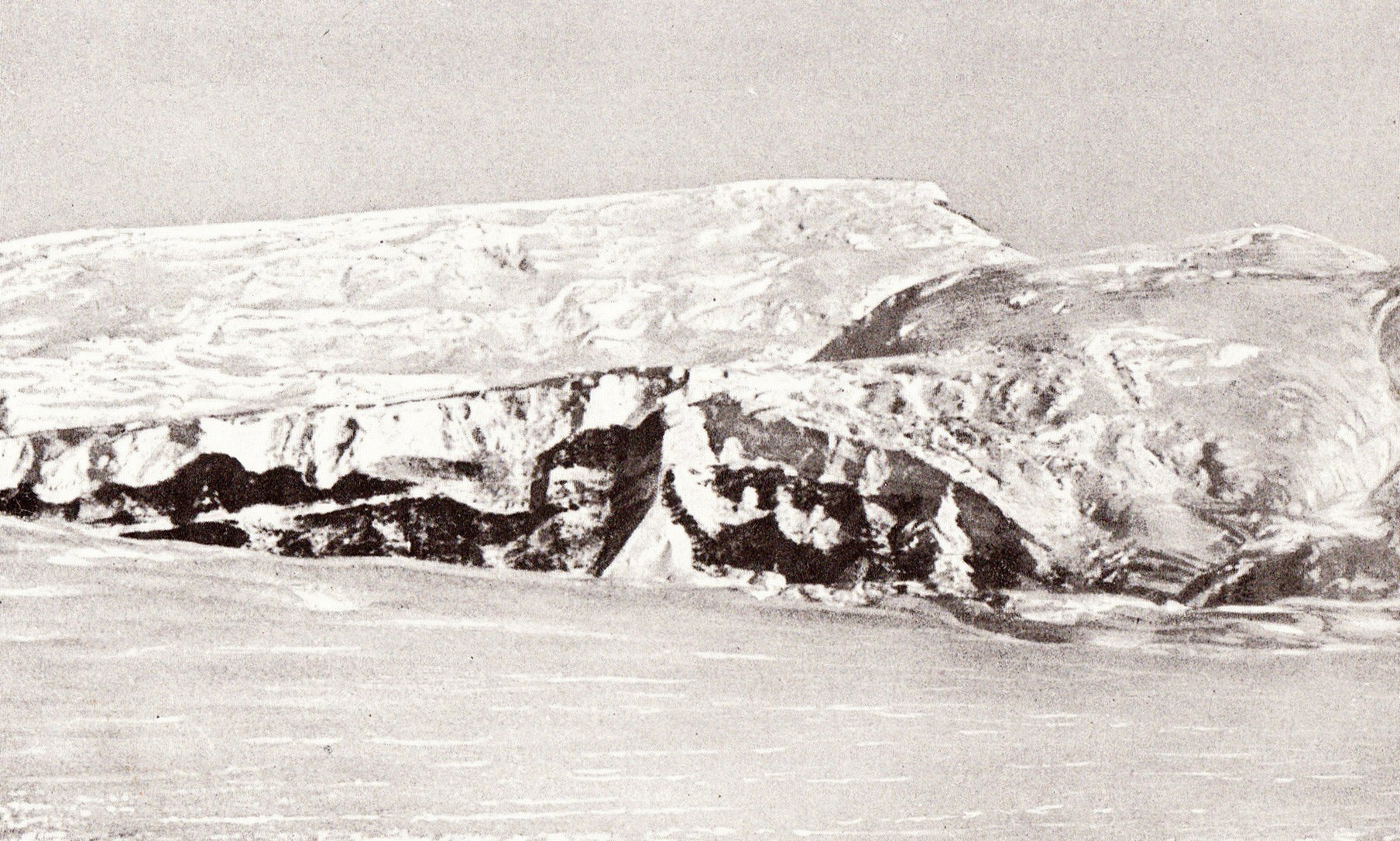
- Mount Fridtjof Nansen, named and photographed by Roald Amundsen

Highest point
- Elevation: 1,451 m (4,760 ft)

Geography
- Location within Antarctica
- Continent: Antarctica
- Region: Ross Dependency
- Range coordinates: 85°22′S 165°30′W

The Herbert Range (85°22′S 165°30′W) is a range in the Queen Maud Mountains of Antarctica, extending from the edge of the Antarctic Plateau to the Ross Ice Shelf between the Axel Heiberg Glacier and Strom Glacier. Named by the New Zealand Antarctic Place-Names Committee (NZ-APC) for Walter W. Herbert, leader of the Southern Party of the New Zealand GSAE (1961–62) which explored the Axel Heiberg Glacier area.

== Course ==
The Herbert Range runs from west to east between the Axel Heiberg Glacier to the south and the Strom Glacier to the north. Peaks in the west include Gjelsvik Peak, Mount Fridtjof Nansen, Webster Knob and Mount Balchen. Peaks further east include Bell Peak, Mount Cohen, Zigzag Bluff and Mount Betty, to the north of Bigend Saddle. Cohen Glacier runs north from Mount Cohen to join Strom Glacier. Sargent Glacier runs southwest from Mount Cohen to join Axel Heiberg Glacier.

== Features ==
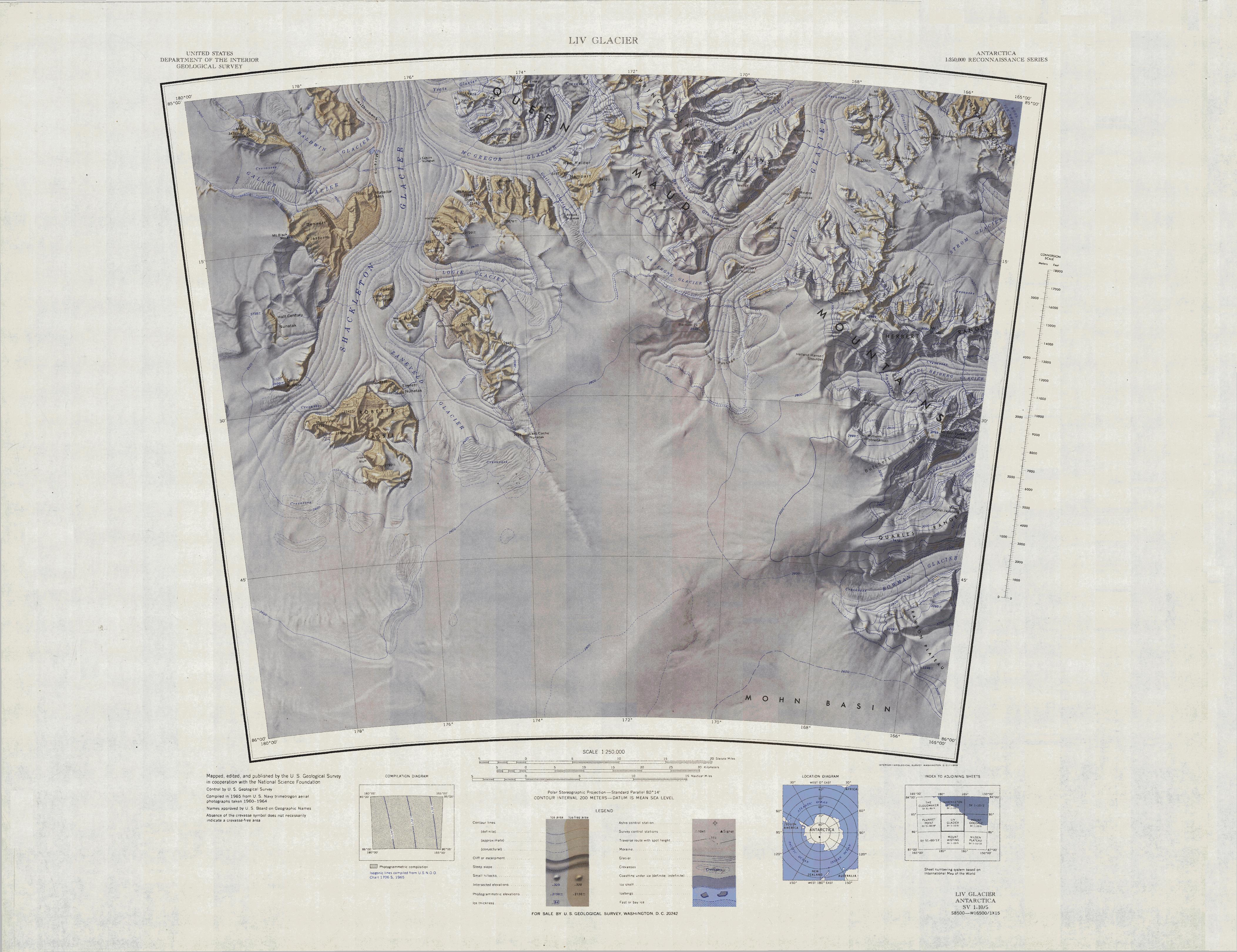
West part of the range (center, east)

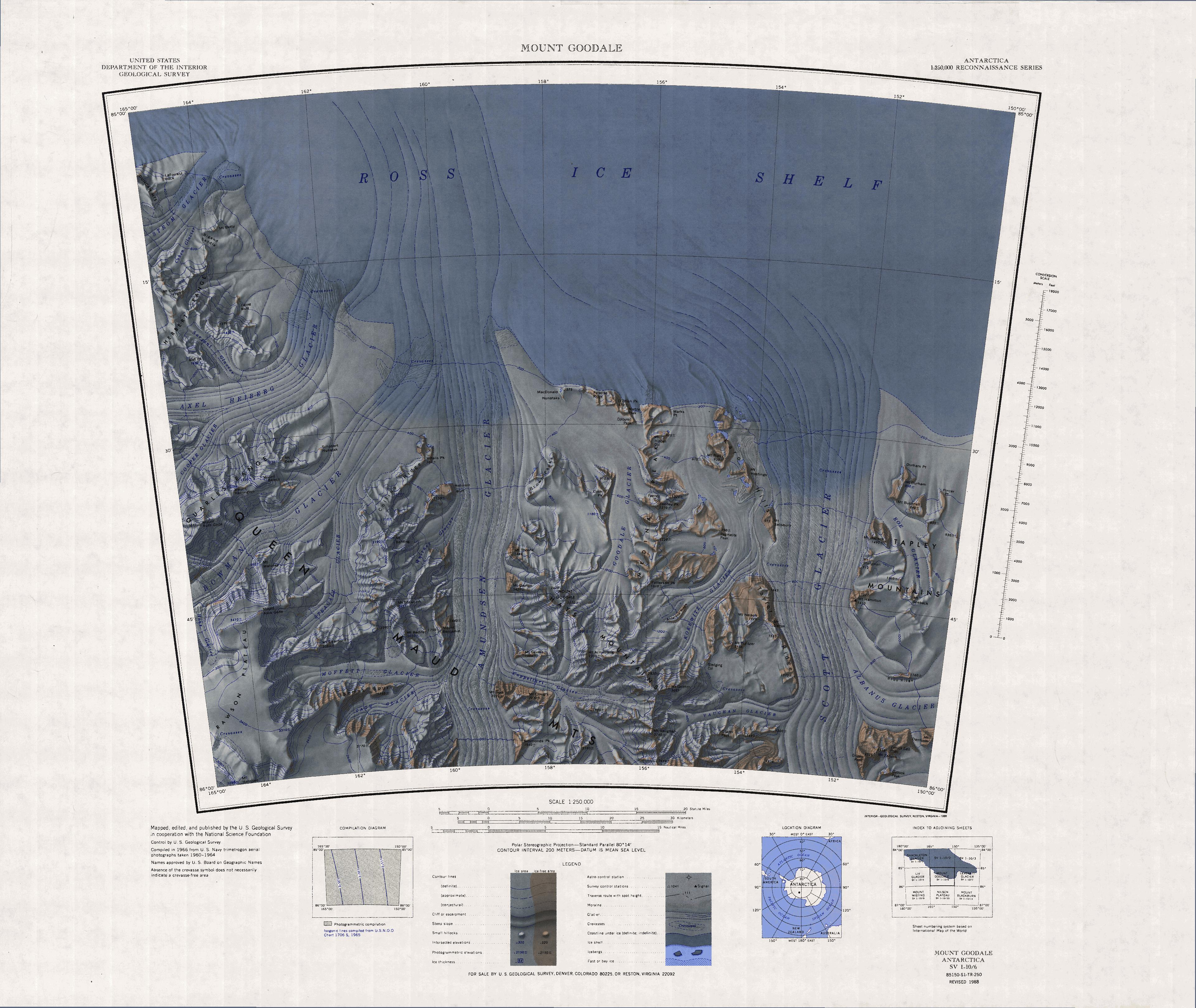
East part of the range (center, west)

Geographical features include:

=== Gjelsvik Peak ===
85°19′S 168°00′W. A peak, 3,660 metres (12,010 ft) high, standing 2.5 nautical miles (4.6 km; 2.9 mi) northwest of Mount Fridtjof Nansens. Named by the Southern Party of the New Zealand Geological Survey Antarctic Expedition (NZGSAE) (1961–62) for Tore Gjelsvik, Director of the Norsk Polarinstitutt, Oslo.

=== Mount Fridtjof Nansen ===
85°21′S 167°33′W. A high massive mountain, 4,070 metres (13,350 ft) high, which dominates the area between the heads of Strom and Axel Heiberg Glaciers, in the Queen Maud Mountains. Discovered by Roald Amundsen in 1911, and named by him for Fridtjof Nansen, polar explorer, who helped support Amundsen's expedition.

=== Barracouta Ridge ===
85°20′S 166°35′W. A long jagged ridge which terminates on the north in Webster Knob. The ridge is an extension from the base of Mount Fridtjof Nansen into the head of Strom Glacier. Discovered and visited in 1929 by the geological party under Laurence Gould of the Byrd Antarctic Expedition (ByrdAE), 1928–30. It was climbed by geologists of the Southern Party of the NZGSAE, 1963–64. The descriptive name, applied by the Southern Party derives from the appearance of the toothlike pinnacle along the crest of the ridge.

=== Cenotaph Hill ===
85°13′S 167°12′W. A rock peak, 2,070 metres (6,790 ft) high, on the ridge separating the heads of Strom Glacier and Liv Glacier in the Queen Maud Mountains. The peak is 8 nautical miles (15 km; 9.2 mi) north-northeast of the summit of Mount Fridtjof Nansen. It was visited by the Southern Party of NZGSAE (1963–64) who gave this name because the unusual knob of rock forming the summit resembles a monument.

=== Mount Balchen ===
85°22′S 166°12′W. A prominent peak, 3,085 m, standing 6 nautical miles (11 km; 6.9 mi) east of the summit of Mount Fridtjof Nansen. Named by the Southern Party of the NZGSAE (1961–62) for Bernt Balchen, pilot with Roald Amundsen on Arctic flights, and with R. Admiral Richard E. Byrd on his South Pole flight of 1929.

=== Bell Peak ===
85°22′S 164°14′W. A peak, 1,620 metres (5,310 ft) high, surmounting a southeast trending spur, just southwest of Sargent Glacier. The peak was probably observed by Roald Amundsen's south polar party in 1911, and was later roughly mapped by the ByrdAE, 1928–30. Named by US-ACAN for G. Grant Bell who studied cosmic rays at McMurdo Station, winter party 1962.

=== Mount Cohen ===
85°16′S 164°27′W. A peak, 1,765 metres (5,791 ft) high, standing 6 nautical miles (11 km; 6.9 mi) southwest of Mount Betty in the Herbert Range. Discovered by Rear Admiral Byrd on several ByrdAE plane flights to the Queen Maud Mountains in November 1929, and named by him for Emanuel Cohen of Paramount Pictures, who assisted in assembling the motion picture records of the expedition.

=== Zigzag Bluff ===
85°18′S 163°30′W. A rock bluff at the foot of Herbert Range, overlooking Ross Ice Shelf about 5 nautical miles (9.3 km; 5.8 mi) west of the terminus of Axel Heiberg Glacier. Probably first seen by Roald Amundsen in 1911, the bluff was roughly mapped by the ByrdAE, 1928–30. So named by the Southern Party of the NZGSAE, 1961–62, because of the peculiar folding of the marble on the bluff.

=== Mount Betty ===
85°11′S 163°45′W. A small ridge overlooking Ross Ice Shelf, located on the north side of Bigend Saddle in the northeast extremity of the Herbert Range. Discovered in November 1911 by Captain Roald Amundsen, and named by him for Betty Andersson, nurse and housekeeper in the Amundsen family for many years. A cairn was erected on the ridge by Amundsen on 6 January 1912, on his way back to Framheim from the South Pole. It is known as "Amundsen’s cairn" and has been designated a Historic Site or Monument (HSM 24), following a proposal by Norway to the Antarctic Treaty Consultative Meeting.

=== Bigend Saddle ===
85°12′S 163°50′W. A snow-covered saddle at the southwest side of Mount Betty in northern Herbert Range, Queen Maud Mountains. The saddle was traversed in December 1929 by the ByrdAE geological party under Laurence Gould. It was named by the Southern Party of the NZGSAE, 1963–64, because one of the party's motor toboggans was abandoned here with a smashed big end bearing.

== Sources ==
- Alberts, Fred G., ed. (1995), Geographic Names of the Antarctic (PDF) (2 ed.), United States Board on Geographic Names This article incorporates public domain material from websites or documents of the United States Board on Geographic Names.
- List of Historic Sites and Monuments approved by the ATCM (2012) (PDF), Antarctic Treaty Secretariat, 2012
- Liv Glacier, USGS: United States Geological Survey
- Mount Goodale, USGS: United States Geological Survey, 1966

This article incorporates public domain material from websites or documents of the United States Geological Survey.
