= Axel Heiberg Glacier =

Glacier in Antarctica

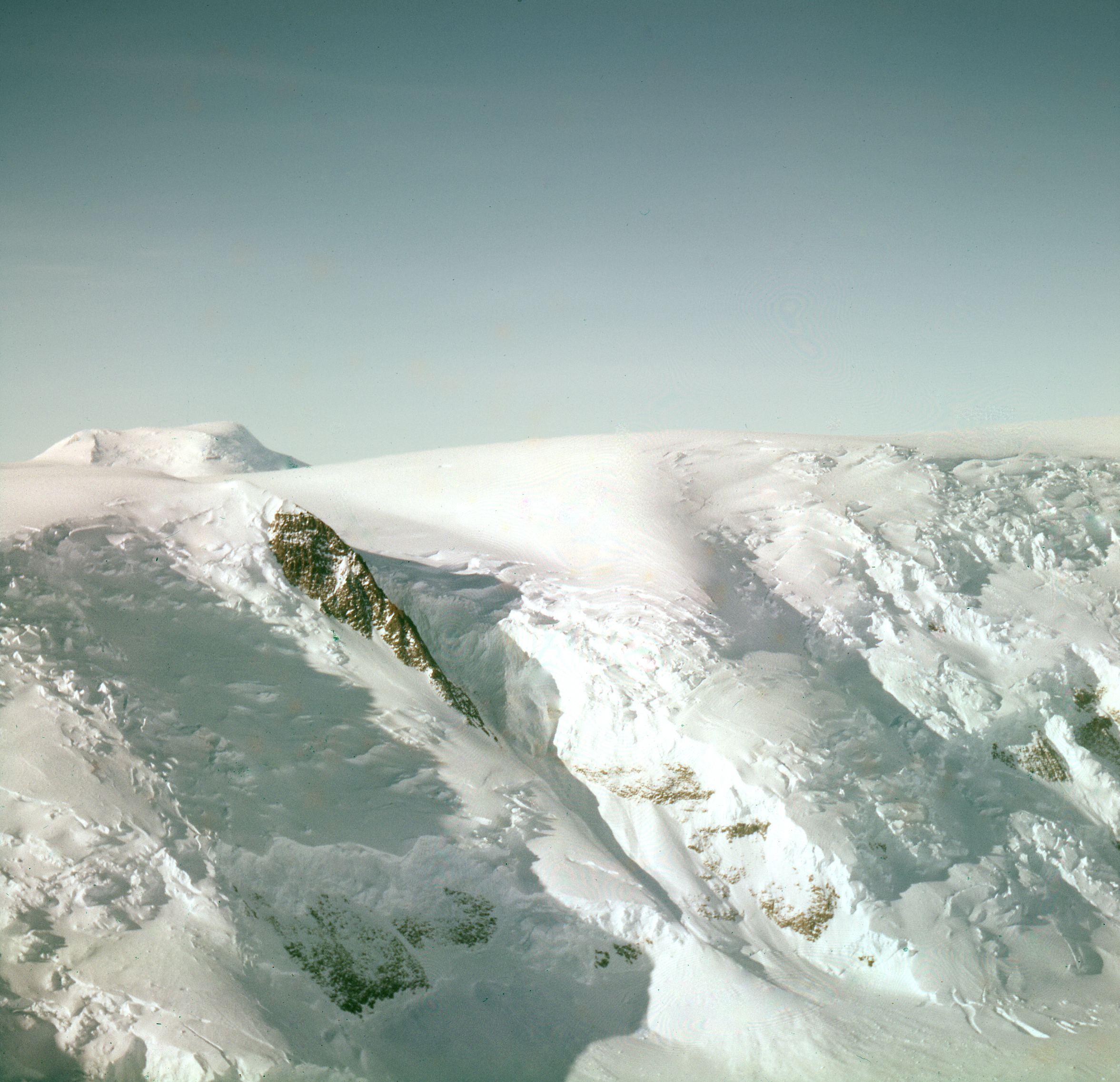
- Aerial view of the Axel Heiberg Glacier in 1956–57

- Location within Antarctica
- Type: Valley glacier
- Location: Queen Maud Mountains, Antarctica
- Coordinates: 85°25′S 163°0′W
- Length: 56 km (35 mi)
- Thickness: unknown
- Terminus: Ross Ice Shelf
- Status: unknown

The Axel Heiberg Glacier (85°25′S 163°00′W) in Antarctica is a valley glacier, 30 nautical miles (56 km; 35 mi) long, descending from the high elevations of the Antarctic Plateau into the Ross Ice Shelf (nearly at sea level) between the Herbert Range and Mount Don Pedro Christophersen in the Queen Maud Mountains.

== Discovery and name ==
The glacier was discovered in November 1911 by the Norwegian polar explorer Roald Amundsen, and named by him for Consul Axel Heiberg, a Norwegian businessman and patron of science who contributed to numerous Norwegian polar expeditions.

Amundsen used this glacier as his route up onto the polar plateau during his successful expedition to the South Pole.

== Characteristics ==
According to Sailing Directions for Antarctica (1960), "The Axel Heiberg Glacier, about 6 miles wide and 27 miles long, lies southeastward of the Fridtjof Nansen massif. It trends in a northeast.–southwest direction and is steep, reaching an elevation of 10,920 feet at the southem portal. It was discovered and traversed by Amundsen in November 1911, on his journey to the south pole."

Unlike the big “outlet” glaciers such as the Beardmore, Shackleton and Liv, the Axel Heiberg is in effect an alpine glacier, cut off from the polar plateau by a dolerite rim and fed entirely from the uncharacteristically heavy snow falling within its own catchment. It falls over 2,700 m (9,000 ft) in 32 km (20 mi), most of it over 11 km (7 mi).

== Course ==
The Axel Heiberg Glacier forms below the polar plateau below Helland Hansen Shoulder to the north, Mount Engelstad in the center and Mount Wilhelm Christopherson and Butchers Spur to the south. Mount Don Pedro Christophersen defines the eastern end of Butchers spur, and separates the Axel Heiberg Glacier from Cooper Glacier. In its upper reach the glacier descends through the Amundsen Icefall, then flows west to the south of the Herbert Range. It is joined by the Cooper Glacier from the south, and by the Sargent Glacier from the north, to the east of Bell Peak. It turns north and flows into the Ross Ice Shelf to the east of the Strom Glacier and west of the Bowman Glacier and Amundsen Glacier.

== Features ==
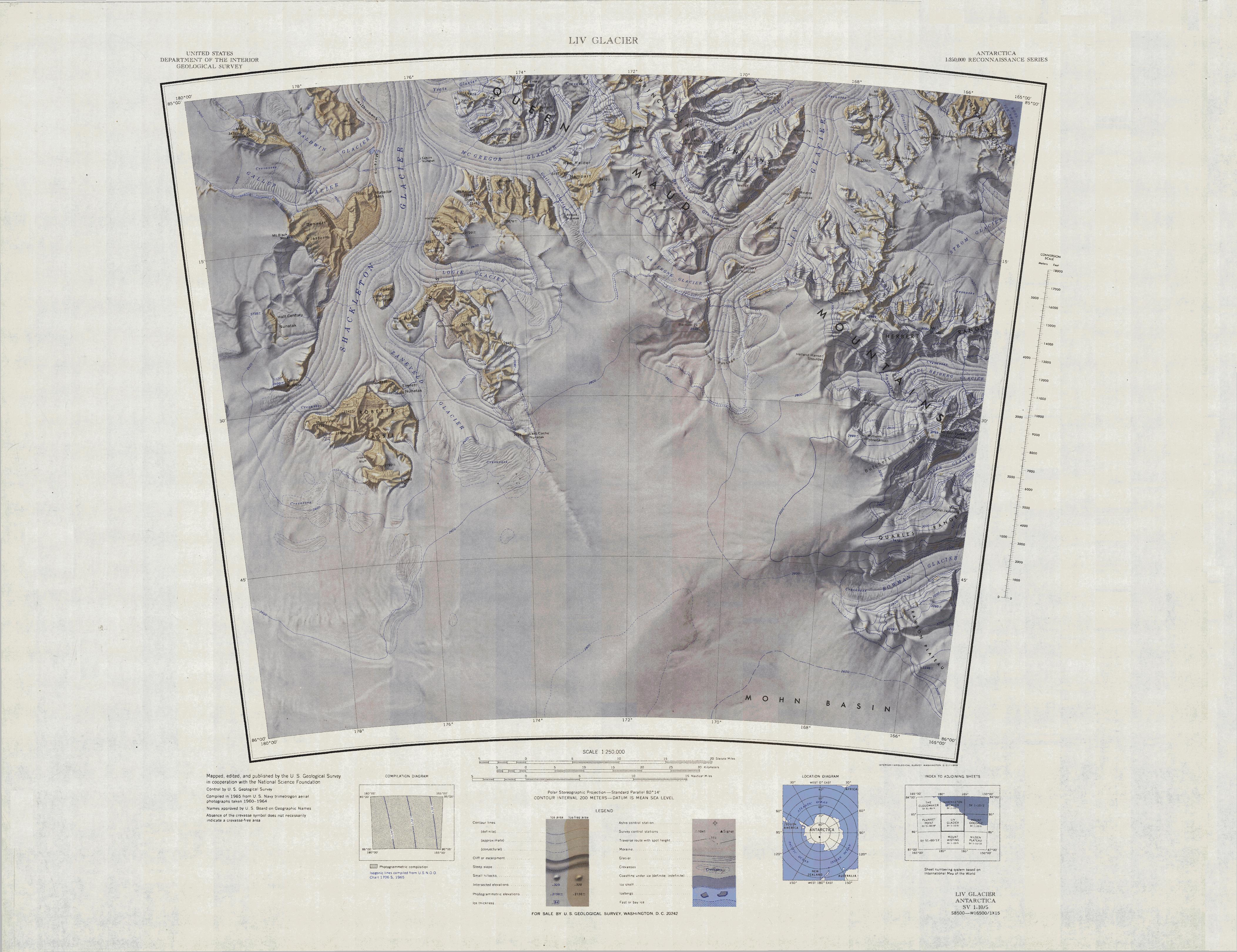
Upper section of the glacier (center, east)

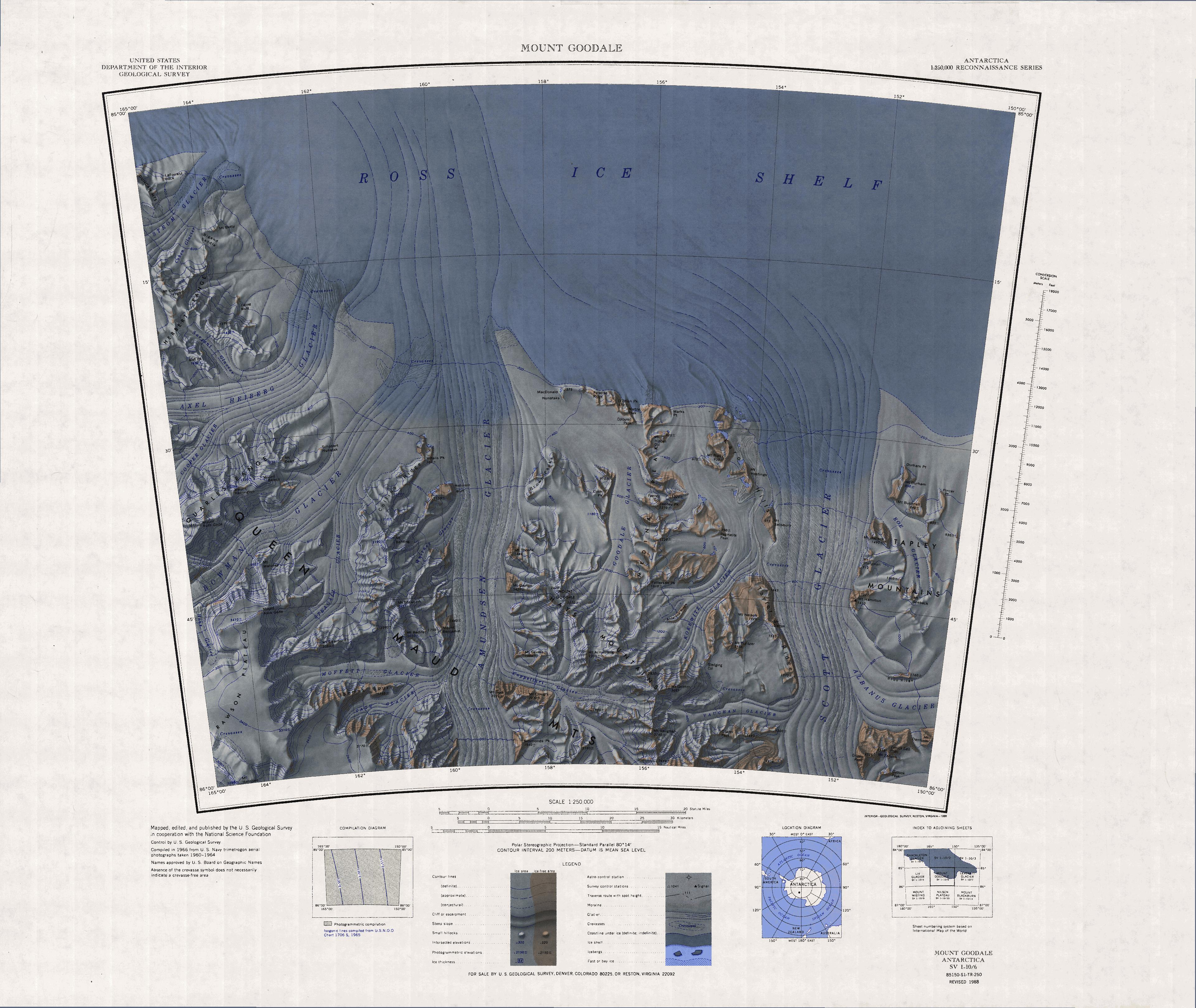
Lower section of the glacier (center, west)

=== Helland Hansen Shoulder ===
85°26′S 168°10′W.

A mainly ice-covered ridge which extends southward from the west portion of Mount Fridtjof Nansen and overlooks the northern side of the head of Axel Heiberg Glacier. It was discovered in 1911 by Roald Armundsen and named by him for Prof. B. Helland Hansen, of the University of Oslo, Norway.

=== Mount Engelstad ===
85°29′S 167°24′W.

A rounded snow-covered summit rising from the edge of the polar plateau at the head of Axel Heiberg Glacier, about midway between Helland-Hansen Shoulder and Mount Wilhelm Christophersen. It was discovered in 1911 by Roald Amundsen and named by him for Captain Ole Engelstad, of the Norwegian Navy, who had been selected as second in command of the Fram to carry the expedition to Antarctica, but who was killed in a scientific experiment preceding its departure.

=== Mount Wilhelm Christophersen ===
85°33′S 167°20′W.

A mound-shaped, ice-covered knob which rises from the edge of the polar plateau 3 nautical miles (5.6 km; 3.5 mi) south of Mount Engelstad and overlooks the south side of the head of Axel Heiberg Glacier. It was discovered in 1911 by Roald Amundsen and named by him for Wilhelm Christophersen, Norwegian diplomat and Minister at Buenos Aires at that time.

=== Butchers Spur ===
85°34′S 166°30′W.

A high ice-covered spur which descends southwestward from Mount Don Pedro Christophersen to the polar plateau. This feature on the south margin of the Queen Maud Mountains is the location of Roald Amundsen's "Butcher Shop." It was here in November 1911 that his party slaughtered their excess sledge dogs, consuming portions themselves and permitting the remaining sledge dogs a feast, prior to making the final dash to the South Pole, which was reached December 14.

=== Mount Don Pedro Christophersen ===
85°32′S 165°47′W.

A massive, largely ice-covered, gabled mountain 3,765 metres (12,352 ft) high, surmounting the divide between the heads of Axel Heiberg and Cooper Glaciers. It was discovered in 1911 by Roald Amundsen, who named it for one of the expedition's chief supporters who lived in Buenos Aires.

=== Cooper Glacier ===
85°30′S 164°30′W.

A tributary glacier, 15 nautical miles (28 km; 17 mi) long, flowing northeast between Butchers Spur and Quarles Range to enter the south side of Axel Heiberg Glacier. It was discovered by Rear Admiral Byrd on several plane flights to the Queen Maud Mountains in November 1929, and named by him for Kent Cooper, an official of the Associated Press.

=== Amundsen Icefall ===
85°28′S 166°42′W.

A steep and turbulent icefall where the Axel Heiberg Glacier descends from the polar plateau between Mount Fridtjof Nansen and Mount Don Pedro Christophersen. It was named by the Southern Party of the NZGSAE (1961-62) for Captain Roald Amundsen, who ascended Axel Heiberg Glacier enroute to the South Pole in 1911.

=== Sargent Glacier ===
85°23′S 163°50′W.

A steep-walled tributary glacier, flowing southeast from the Herbert Range to enter Axel Heiberg Glacier just southeast of Bell Peak. Probably first seen by Roald Amundsen's polar party in 1911, the glacier was mapped by the ByrdAE, 1928-30. It was named by US-ACAN for Howard H. Sargent III who made ionospheric studies at the South Pole Station in 1964.

== See also ==
- List of glaciers in the Antarctic
- Beardmore Glacier
- Glaciology

== Sources ==
- Alberts, Fred G., ed. (1995), Geographic Names of the Antarctic (PDF) (2 ed.), United States Board on Geographic Names This article incorporates public domain material from websites or documents of the United States Board on Geographic Names.
- Liv Glacier, USGS: United States Geological Survey
- Mount Goodale, USGS: United States Geological Survey, 1966
- Otway, Peter (21 September 2011), "Gateways to the Pole: Mapping Amundsen's and Scott's Routes through the Transantarctic Mountains Fifty Years Later" (PDF), www.antarctican.org, archived from the original (PDF) on 12 November 2011
- Sailing Directions for Antarctica: Including the Off-Lying Islands South of Latitude 60 Degrees S. (2 ed.), United States. Hydrographic Office, 1960, hdl:2346/88464 This article incorporates public domain material from websites or documents of the United States Hydrographic Office.

This article incorporates public domain material from websites or documents of the United States Geological Survey.
