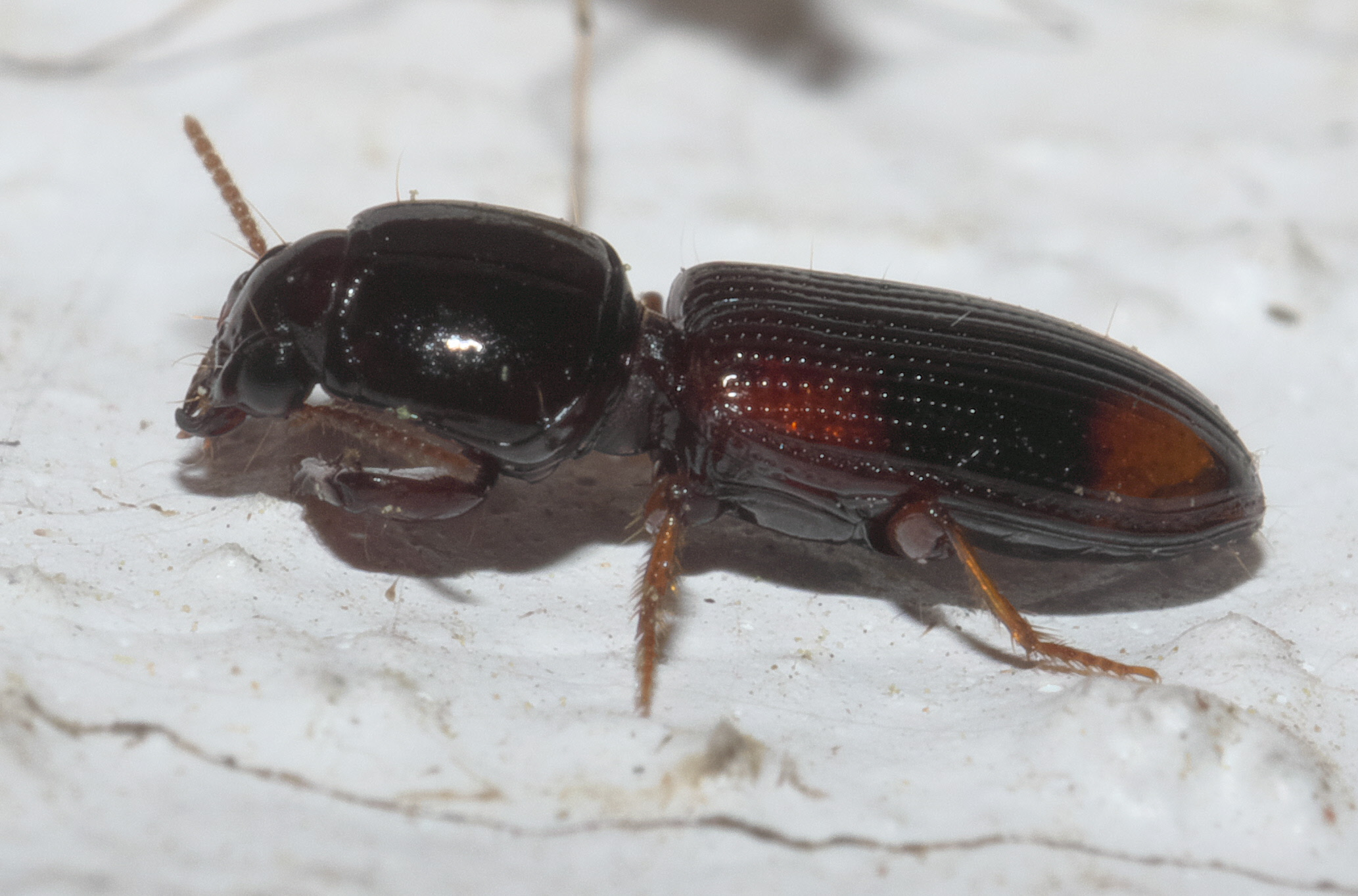
- Paraclivina bipustulata

Scientific classification
- Domain: Eukaryota
- Kingdom: Animalia
- Phylum: Arthropoda
- Class: Insecta
- Order: Coleoptera
- Suborder: Adephaga
- Family: Carabidae
- Tribe: Clivinini
- Genus: Paraclivina; Kult, 1947

= Paraclivina =

Genus of beetles

Paraclivina is a genus of ground beetles in the family Carabidae. There are about 10 described species in Paraclivina.

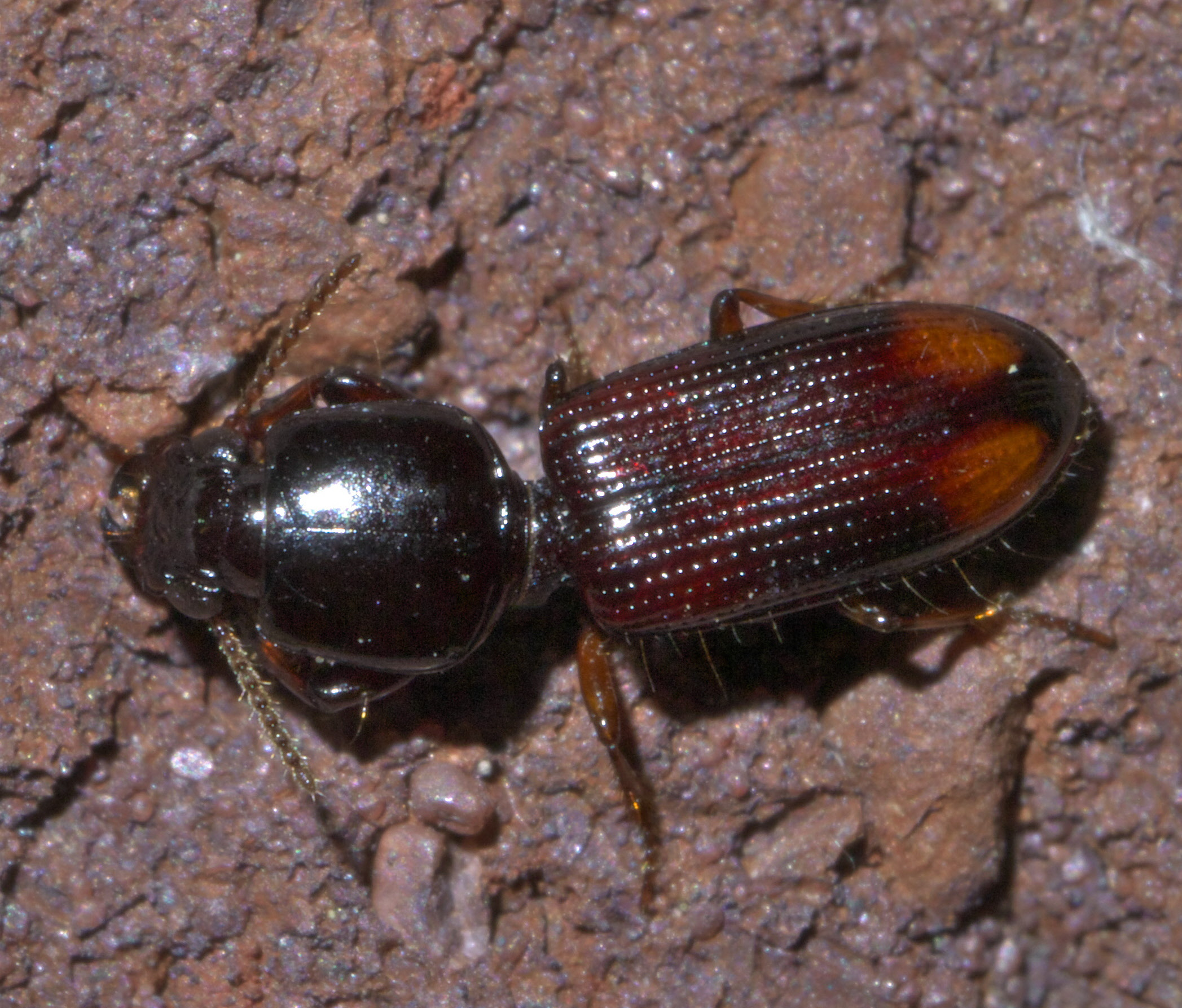
Paraclivina bipustulata

== Species ==
- Listronotus distinctus Henderson LS, 1941
- Paraclivina bipustulata (Fabricius, 1798)
- Paraclivina convexa (LeConte, 1844)
- Paraclivina fasciata (Putzeys, 1846)
- Paraclivina ferrea (LeConte, 1857)
- Paraclivina marginipennis (Putzeys, 1846)
- Paraclivina postica (LeConte, 1846)
- Paraclivina stigmula (Putzeys, 1846)
- Paraclivina striatopunctata (Dejean, 1831)
- Paraclivina sulcipennis (Putzeys, 1867)
