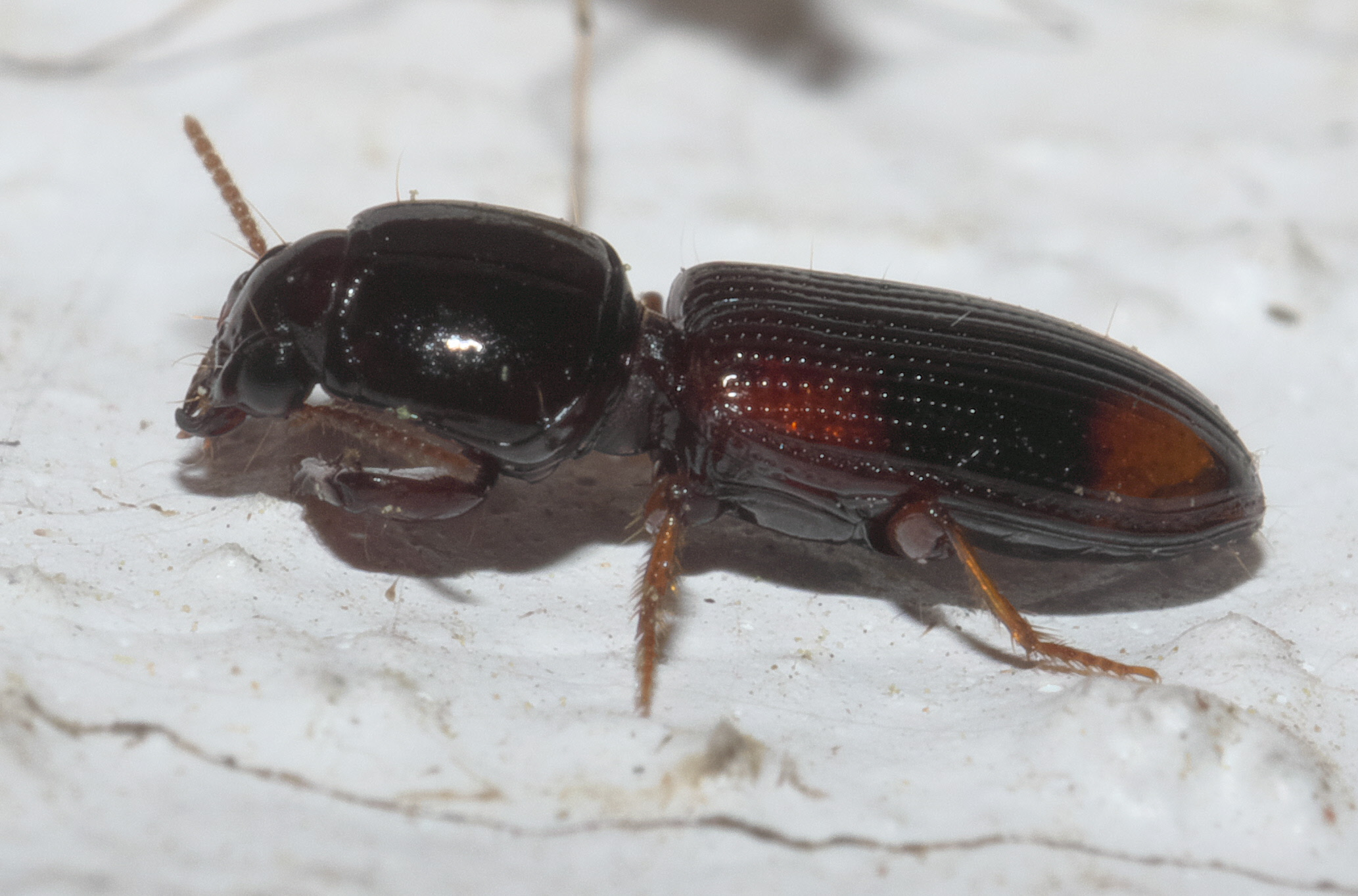

Scientific classification
- Kingdom: Animalia
- Phylum: Arthropoda
- Class: Insecta
- Order: Coleoptera
- Suborder: Adephaga
- Family: Carabidae
- Genus: Paraclivina
- Species: P. bipustulata

Binomial name
- Paraclivina bipustulata (Fabricius, 1798)

= Paraclivina bipustulata =

Species of beetle

Paraclivina bipustulata is a species of ground beetle in the family Carabidae. It is found in the Caribbean, Central America, and North America.

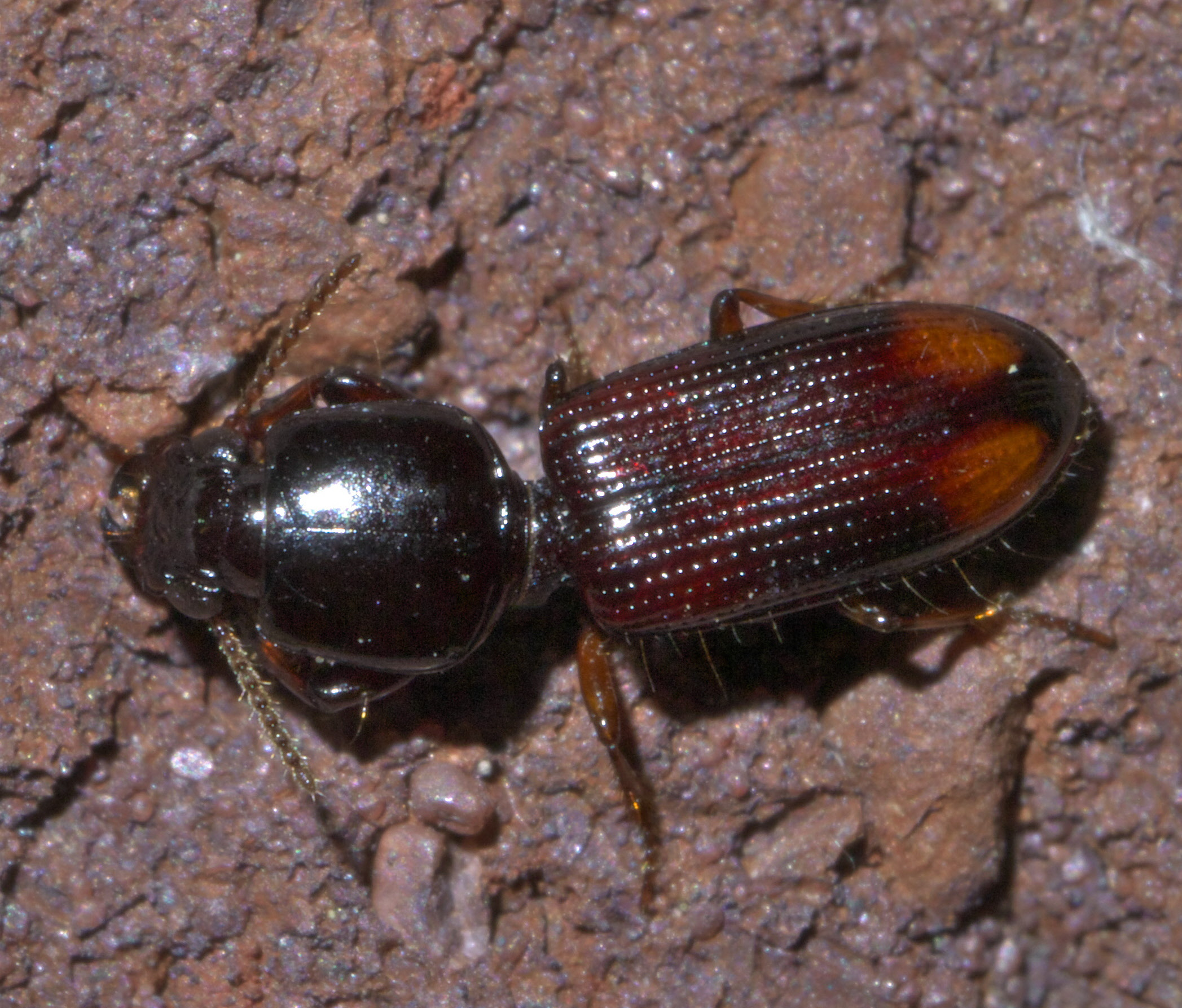
Paraclivina bipustulata, Pryor, OK, USA
