= Paraclivina postica =

Scientific classification
- Kingdom: Animalia
- Phylum: Arthropoda
- Clade: Pancrustacea
- Class: Insecta
- Order: Coleoptera
- Suborder: Adephaga
- Family: Carabidae
- Genus: Paraclivina
- Species: P. postica

Binomial name
- Paraclivina postica (LeConte, 1846)

Synonyms
- Clivina postica LeConte, 1846

Species of beetle

Paraclivina postica is a species of ground beetle in the family Carabidae. It occurs in the United States east of the Rocky Mountains.
