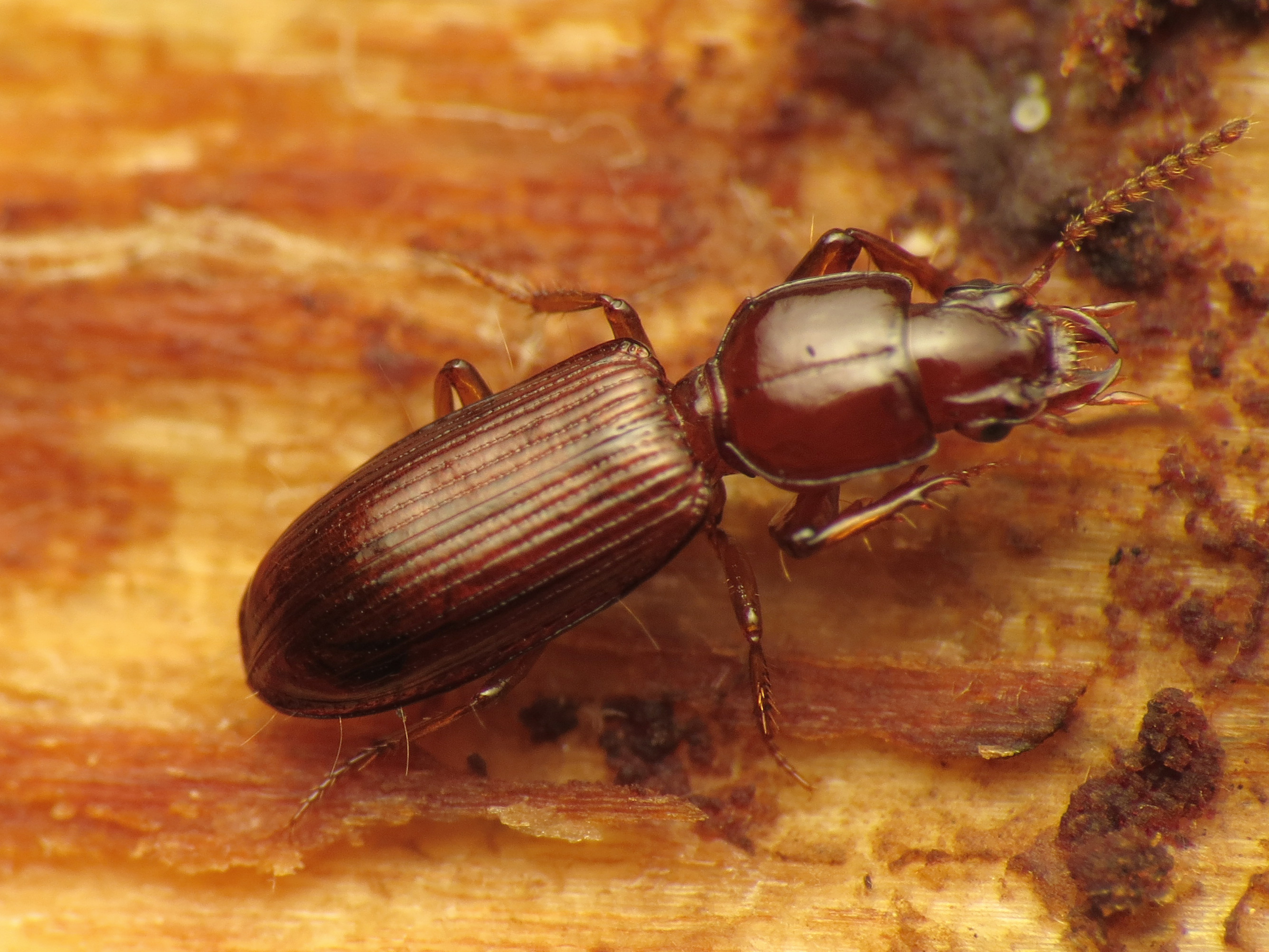

Scientific classification
- Domain: Eukaryota
- Kingdom: Animalia
- Phylum: Arthropoda
- Class: Insecta
- Order: Coleoptera
- Suborder: Adephaga
- Family: Carabidae
- Genus: Paraclivina
- Species: P. ferrea

Binomial name
- Paraclivina ferrea (LeConte, 1857)

Synonyms
- Clivina ferrea LeConte, 1857

= Paraclivina ferrea =

Species of beetle

Paraclivina ferrea is a species of ground beetle in the family Carabidae.
