= Sky-Hi Nunataks =

Nunatak group in Palmer Land, Antarctica

- Location within Antarctica

Geography
- Continent: Antarctica

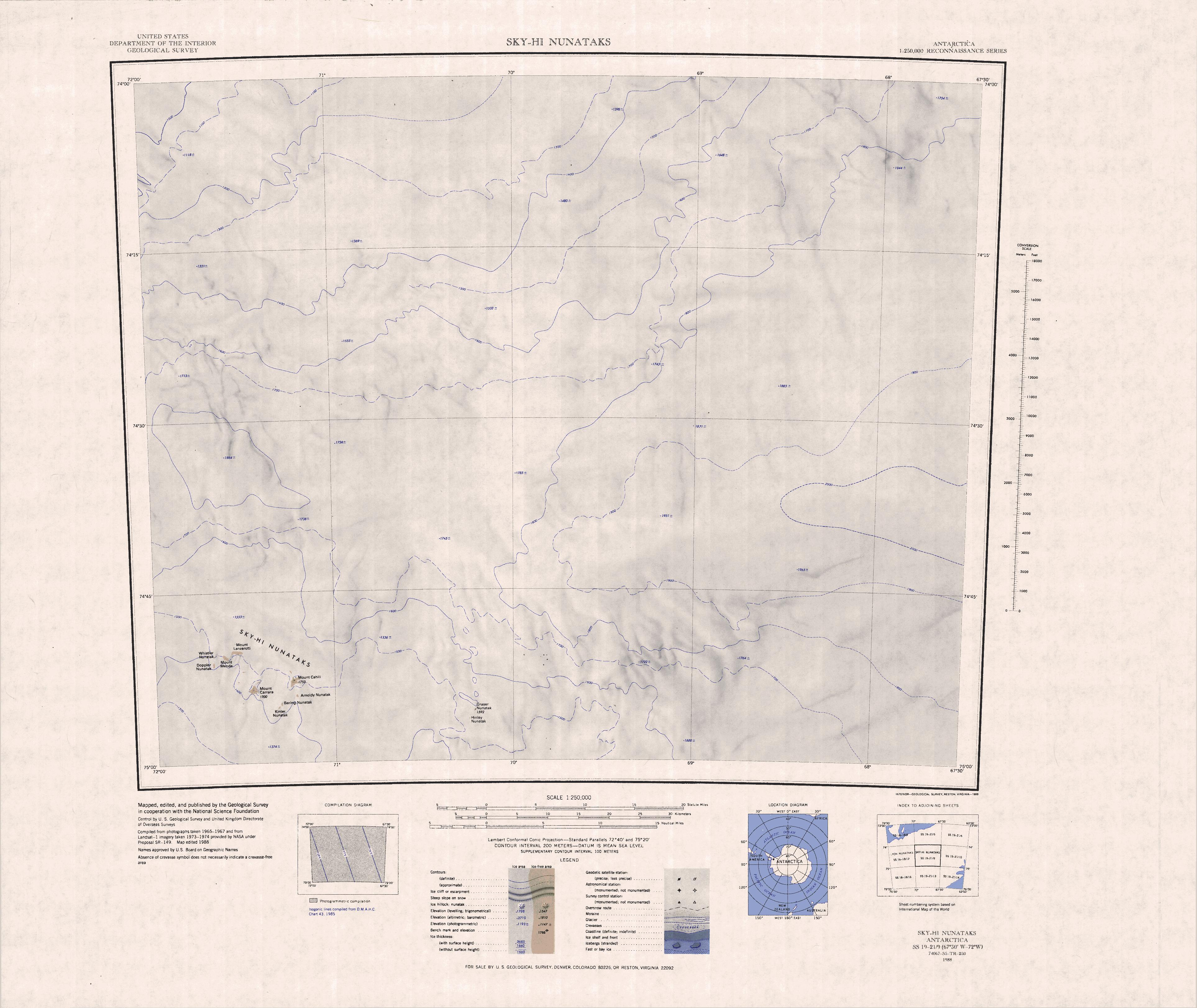
1:250,000 scale topographic map of the Sky-Hi Nunataks.

The Sky-Hi Nunataks are a nunatak group 8 nautical miles (15 km; 9.2 mi) long, located 11 nautical miles (20 km; 13 mi) east of Grossman Nunataks and northeast of Merrick Mountains in Ellsworth Land, extending from Doppler Nunatak in the west to Arnoldy Nunatak in the east and including Mount Mende, Mount Lanzerotti, Mount Carrara, and Mount Cahill.

== Location ==
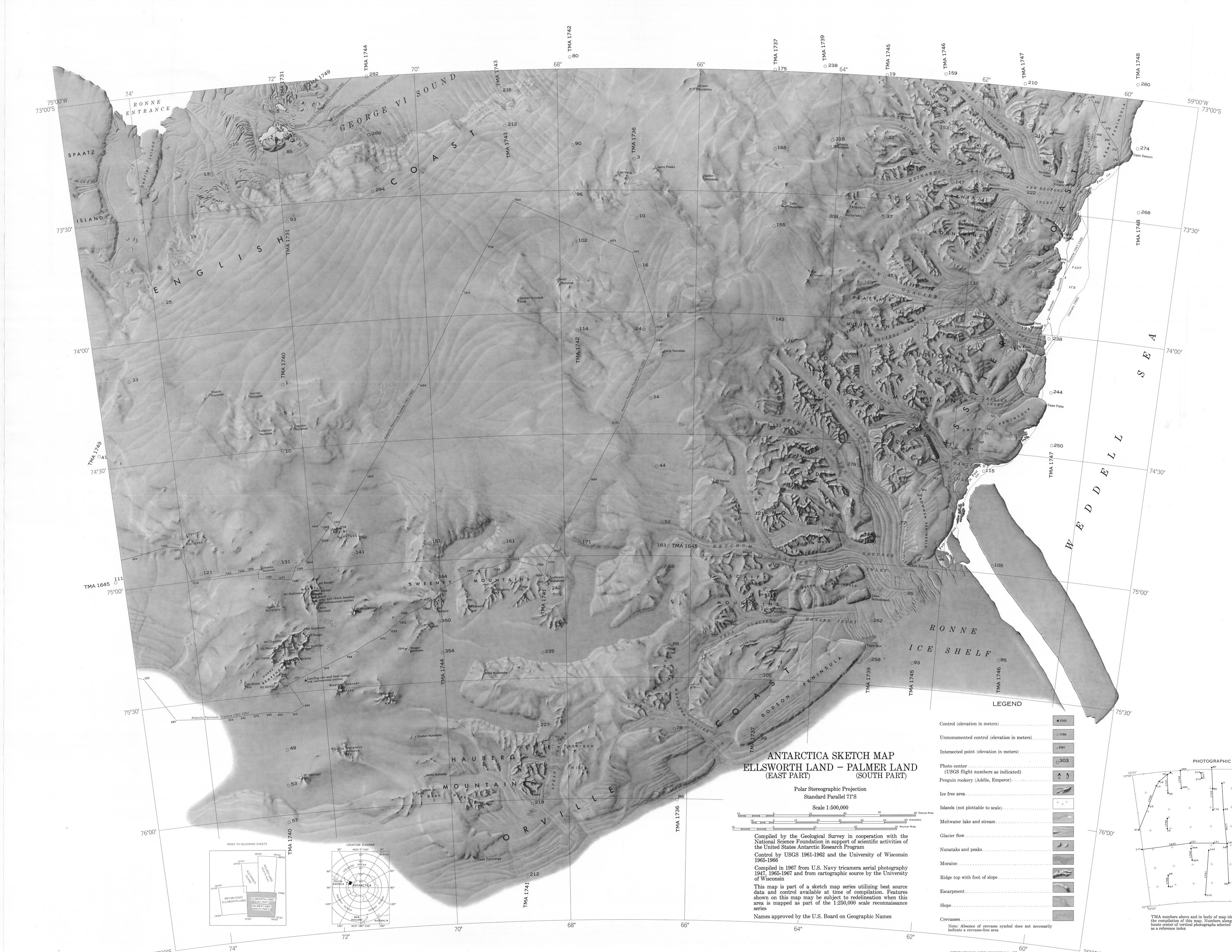
Eastern Ellsworth Land (south), Southern Palmer Land (north). Behrendt Mountains in southwest of map.

The Sky-Hi Nunataks are in eastern Ellsworth Land, They are east of Lyon Nunataks, northeast of Merrick Mountains and northwest of Sweeney Mountains. Features, from west to east, include Doppler Nunatak, Whistler Nunatak, Mount Mende, Mount Lanzerotti, Mount Carrara, Kinter Nunatak, Bering Nunatak, Mount Cahill and Arnoldy Nunatak. Graser Nunatak and Hinley Nunatak are some distance to the east.

== Mapping and name ==
The nunataks were first seen and photographed from the air by Ronne Antarctic Research Expedition (RARE), 1947–48. The name derives from the United States Antarctic Research Program (USARP) project Sky-Hi, in which Camp Sky-Hi (later designated Eights Station) was set up in Ellsworth Land in November 1961 as a conjugate point station to carry on simultaneous measurements of the Earth's magnetic field and of the ionosphere. Sky-Hi's conjugate point in the Northern Hemisphere is located in the Réserve faunique des Laurentides, in Canada. The nunataks were mapped in detail by the United States Geological Survey (USGS) from ground surveys and United States Navy aerial photographs taken 1965-67 and United States Landsat imagery taken 1973–74.

== Features ==
=== Doppler Nunatak ===
74°51′S 71°41′W. A nunatak lying southwest of Mount Mende. Named by the United States Advisory Committee on Antarctic Names (US-ACAN) in 1987 after Christian Johann Doppler (1803-53), Austrian scientist who discovered the Doppler effect in physics.

=== Whistler Nunatak ===
74°50′S 71°41′W. A nunatak lying west of Mount Mende. Named in 1987 by US-ACAN in reference to the whistler effect caused by amplitude change of radio signals in the upper atmosphere and in association with names of upper atmosphere researchers grouped in the area.

=== Mount Mende ===
74°50′S 71°36′W. A nunatak 0.5 nautical miles (0.93 km; 0.58 mi) southwest of Mount Lanzerotti, rising to about 1,500 metres (4,900 ft). Named by US-ACAN in 1987 after Stephen B. Mende of the Lockheed Research Laboratory, Palo Alto, CA, a Principal Investigator in upper atmosphere research, including auroral studies, carried out at Siple Station and South Pole Station from 1973.

=== Mount Lanzerotti ===
74°50′S 71°33′W. The northernmost of the Sky-Hi Nunataks, rising to about 1,550 metres (5,090 ft) high in Ellsworth Land. Named by US-ACAN in 1987 after Louis J. Lanzerotti, Bell Laboratories, Murray Hill, NJ, a Principal Investigator for upper atmosphere research at Siple Station and South Pole Station for many years from 1970; Member, Polar Research Board, National Academy of Sciences, 1982-90; Chairman, Committee on Antarctic Policy and Science, 1992-93.

=== Mount Carrara ===
74°53′S 71°27′W. A mountain rising to 1,700 metres (5,600 ft) high near the center of the Sky-Hi Nunataks. Named by US-ACAN after Paul E. Carrara, USGS geologist, a member of the USGS field party, 1977-78,.which carried out geological reconnaissance mapping of the area between Sky-Hi Nunataks and the Orville Coast. Carrara and two party members climbed the mountain in January 1978.

=== Kinter Nunatak ===
74°55′S 71°19′W. The southernmost of the Sky-Hi Nunataks. Named by US-ACAN in 1987 after Paul M. Kinter, School of Electrical Engineering, Cornell University, Ithaca, NY, who carried out research at Siple Station on VLF wave emissions and interaction in 1980-81.

=== Bering Nunatak ===
74°55′S 71°18′W. A nunatak lying east-southeast of Mount Carrara. Named by US-ACAN after Edgar A. Bering, physicist, University of Houston, TX, who carried out upper atmosphere research at Siple Station in 1980-81.

=== Mount Cahill ===
74°53′S 71°14′W. One of the Sky-Hi Nunataks in Ellsworth Land, rising to 1,755 metres (5,758 ft) high east-northeast of Mount Carrara. Named in 1987 by US-ACAN after Laurence J. Cahill, Jr., physicist, University of Minnesota, Principal Investigator in upper atmospheric physics at Siple Station and South Pole Station for many years from 1973.

=== Arnoldy Nunatak ===
74°54′S 71°12′W. One of the Sky-Hi Nunataks lying 1 nautical mile (1.9 km; 1.2 mi) south of Mount Cahill. Named by US-ACAN in 1987 after Roger L. Arnoldy, physicist, University of New Hampshire, Durham, NH; USARP Principal Investigator in upper atmospheric physics at Siple Station and South Pole Station for many years from 1973.

== Nearby features ==
=== Graser Nunatak ===
74°55′S 70°12′W. A nunatak which is isolated except for Hinely Nunatak 1 nautical mile (1.9 km; 1.2 mi) to the southeast, located 16 nautical miles (30 km; 18 mi) east of Sky-Hi Nunataks. Named in 1987 by US-ACAN after William F. Graser, USGS cartographer who, with John A. Hinely, formed the USGS satellite surveying team at South Pole Station, winter party 1976.

=== Hinely Nunatak ===
74°56′S 70°15′W. A small nunatak, isolated except for Graser Nunatak 1 nautical mile (1.9 km; 1.2 mi) to the northeast, located 16 nautical miles (30 km; 18 mi) east of Sky-Hi Nunataks. Named in 1987 by US-ACAN after John A. Hinely, Jr., USGS civil engineer who, with William F. Graser, formed the USGS satellite surveying team at South Pole Station, winter party 1976.

== Sources ==
- Alberts, Fred G., ed. (1995), Geographic Names of the Antarctic (PDF) (2 ed.), United States Board on Geographic Names This article incorporates public domain material from websites or documents of the United States Board on Geographic Names.
- Ellsworth Land - Palmer Land, USGS: United States Geological Survey
- Sky-Hi Nunataks, USGS: United States Geological Survey

This article incorporates public domain material from websites or documents of the United States Geological Survey.
