= Yee Nunataks =

- Location within Antarctica

Geography
- Continent: Antarctica
- Range coordinates: 74°22′S 72°30′W

The Yee Nunataks (74°22′S 72°30′W) are a group of scattered nunataks, about 24 nautical miles (44 km; 28 mi) long and 12 nautical miles (22 km; 14 mi) wide, centered 35 nautical miles (65 km; 40 mi) northeast of Lyon Nunataks in Ellsworth Land, Antarctica. The nunataks rise 1,300–1,700 metres (4,300–5,600 ft) in elevation and in the four quadrants include Staack Nunatak, Olander Nunatak, Metzgar Nunatak and Triassic Nunatak.

== Location ==
The Yee Nunataks are in eastern Ellsworth Land, to the south of the English Coast of George VI Sound. They are north of the Lyon Nunataks, Merrick Mountains and Sky-Hi Nunataks. Individual nunataks include, from west to east, Staack Nunatak, Horner Nunatak, Tollefson Nunatak and Olander Nunatak.

== Mapping and name ==
The Yee Nunataks were mapped by the United States Geological Survey (USGS) from surveys and United States Navy aerial photographs, 1961–68, and United States Landsat imagery, 1973–74. They were named in 1994 by United States Advisory Committee on Antarctic Names (US-ACAN) after Virginia Yee-Wray, cartographer and air brush specialist in the Shaded Relief and Special Maps Unit, Branch of Special Maps, USGS, who for many years prepared USGS shaded relief maps of Antarctica.

== Features ==
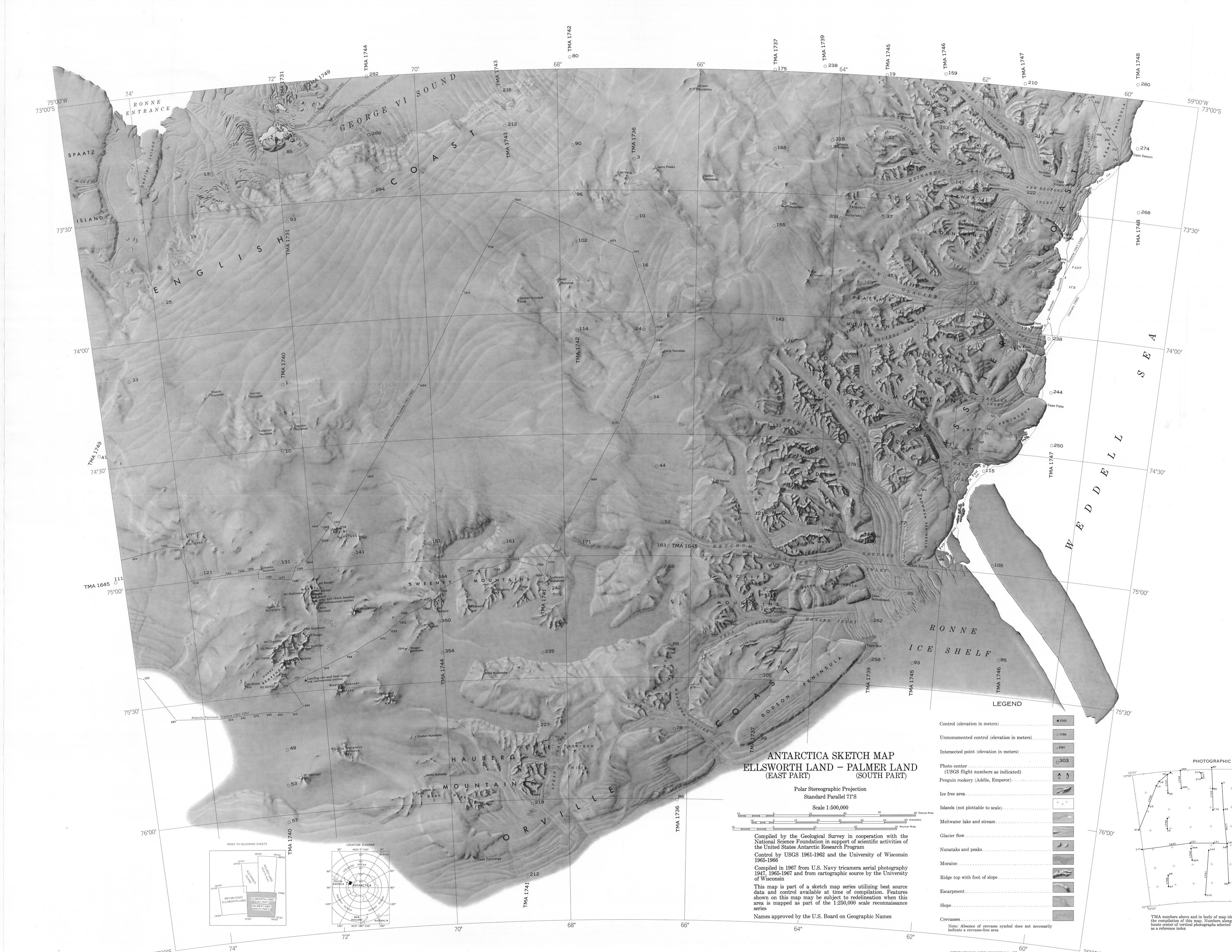
Eastern Ellsworth Land (south), Southern Palmer Land (north). Behrendt Mountains in southwest of map.

=== Triassic Nunatak ===
74°21′S 73°07′W. A small nunatak 1.5 nautical miles (2.8 km; 1.7 mi) southwest of Jurassic Nunatak in the west extremity of the Yee Nunataks. Named by US-ACAN in 1987 after the Triassic Period in geological time and in association with Jurassic Nunatak. The name does not imply the age of the rock constituting this feature.

=== Jurassic Nunatak ===
74°20′S 73°04′W. A small nunatak 1.5 nautical miles (2.8 km; 1.7 mi) northeast of Triassic Nunatak. Mapped by USGS from surveys and United States Navy aerial photographs, 1961-68. Named by US-ACAN in 1987 after the Jurassic Period in geological time and in association with Triassic Nunatak. The name does not imply the age of the rock constituting this feature.

=== Crutcher Rock ===
74°21′S 72°48′W. A nunatak rising to about 1,375 metres (4,511 ft) high, 6 nautical miles (11 km; 6.9 mi) south-southwest of Staack Nunatak. Named by US-ACAN in 1987 after Mont C. Crutcher, a USGS cartographer who worked in the field at Ross Ice Shelf, South Pole Station, Byrd Glacier, and Dome Charlie in 1974-75.

=== Staack Nunatak ===
74°16′S 72°49′W. A nunatak lying 1 nautical mile (1.9 km; 1.2 mi) west of Horner Nunatak, being one of several scattered and somewhat isolated nunataks located 40 nautical miles (74 km; 46 mi) north of the Merrick Mountains. Mapped by USGS from surveys and United States Navy air photos, 1961-67. Named by US-ACAN for Karl J. Staack, a meteorologist at Byrd Station, summer 1965-66.

=== Horner Nunatak ===
74°16′S 72°45′W. A nunatak 1 nautical mile (1.9 km; 1.2 mi) east of Staack Nunatak. Mapped by USGS from surveys and United States Navy air photos, 1961-67. Named by US-ACAN for Stanley Horner, a radioscience researcher at Byrd Station, summer 1962-63.

=== Gardner Nunatak ===
74°26′S 72°46′W. A nunatak rising to about 1,670 metres (5,480 ft) high, 5.5 nautical miles (10.2 km; 6.3 mi) west-southwest of Tollefson Nunatak. Mapped by USGS from surveys and United States Navy aerial photographs, 1961-68, and from Landsat imagery taken 1973-74. Named in 1987 by US-ACAN after Robert N. Gardner, USGS cartographer, who participated in surveys at Cape Crozier (Ross Island), South Pole Station, and Palmer Station, 1973-74.

=== Voight Nunatak ===
74°22′S 72°27′W. A nunatak rising to about 1,500 metres (4,900 ft) high, 3 nautical miles (5.6 km; 3.5 mi) north-northwest of Tollefson Nunatak. Mapped by USGS from surveys and United States Navy aerial photographs 1961-68. Named by US-ACAN in 1987 after William M. Voight, USGS cartographer, who worked in the field in support of the Ross Ice Shelf Project, at Byrd and Siple Stations and at Dome Charlie in 1974-75.

=== Tollefson Nunatak ===
74°25′S 72°25′W. A nunatak lying 5 nautical miles (9.3 km; 5.8 mi) west of Olander Nunatak, being one of several scattered and somewhat isolated nunataks located 40 nautical miles (74 km; 46 mi) north of the Merrick Mountains. Mapped by USGS from surveys and United States Navy air photos, 1961-67. Named by US-ACAN for T.W. Tollefson, construction electrician at Eights Station in 1963.

=== Metzgar Nunatak ===
74°28′S 72°25′W. A nunatak rising to about 1,700 metres (5,600 ft) high, 3 nautical miles (5.6 km; 3.5 mi) south of Tollefson Nunatak. Mapped by USGS from surveys and United States Navy aerial photographs, 1961-68, and from Landsat imagery taken 1973-74. Named in 1987 by US-ACAN after John M. Metzgar, Jr., USGS cartographer, a member of the USGS satellite surveying team at the South Pole Station, winter party 1978.

=== Olander Nunatak ===
74°25′S 72°07′W. One of several somewhat scattered nunataks which rise above the ice of eastern Ellsworth Land, lying 5 nautical miles (9.3 km; 5.8 mi) east of Tollefson Nunatak and 27 nautical miles (50 km; 31 mi) north-northwest of Sky-Hi Nunataks. Mapped by USGS from surveys and United States Navy air photos, 1961-67. Named by US-ACAN for R.E. Olander, electronics technician at Eights Station in 1963.

== Sources ==
- Alberts, Fred G., ed. (1995), Geographic Names of the Antarctic (PDF) (2 ed.), United States Board on Geographic Names This article incorporates public domain material from websites or documents of the United States Board on Geographic Names.
- Ellsworth Land - Palmer Land, USGS: United States Geological Survey

This article incorporates public domain material from websites or documents of the United States Geological Survey.
