= Gardner Inlet =

Body of water in Palmer Land, Antarctica

- Location within Antarctica
- Location: Orville Coast, Antarctica
- Coordinates: 74°58′S 62°52′W
- Type: Inlet
- Ocean/sea sources: Weddell Sea

Gardner Inlet (74°58′S 62°52′W) is a large, ice-filled inlet at the southwest side of Bowman Peninsula, on the east coast of Palmer Land, Antarctica.

== Location ==
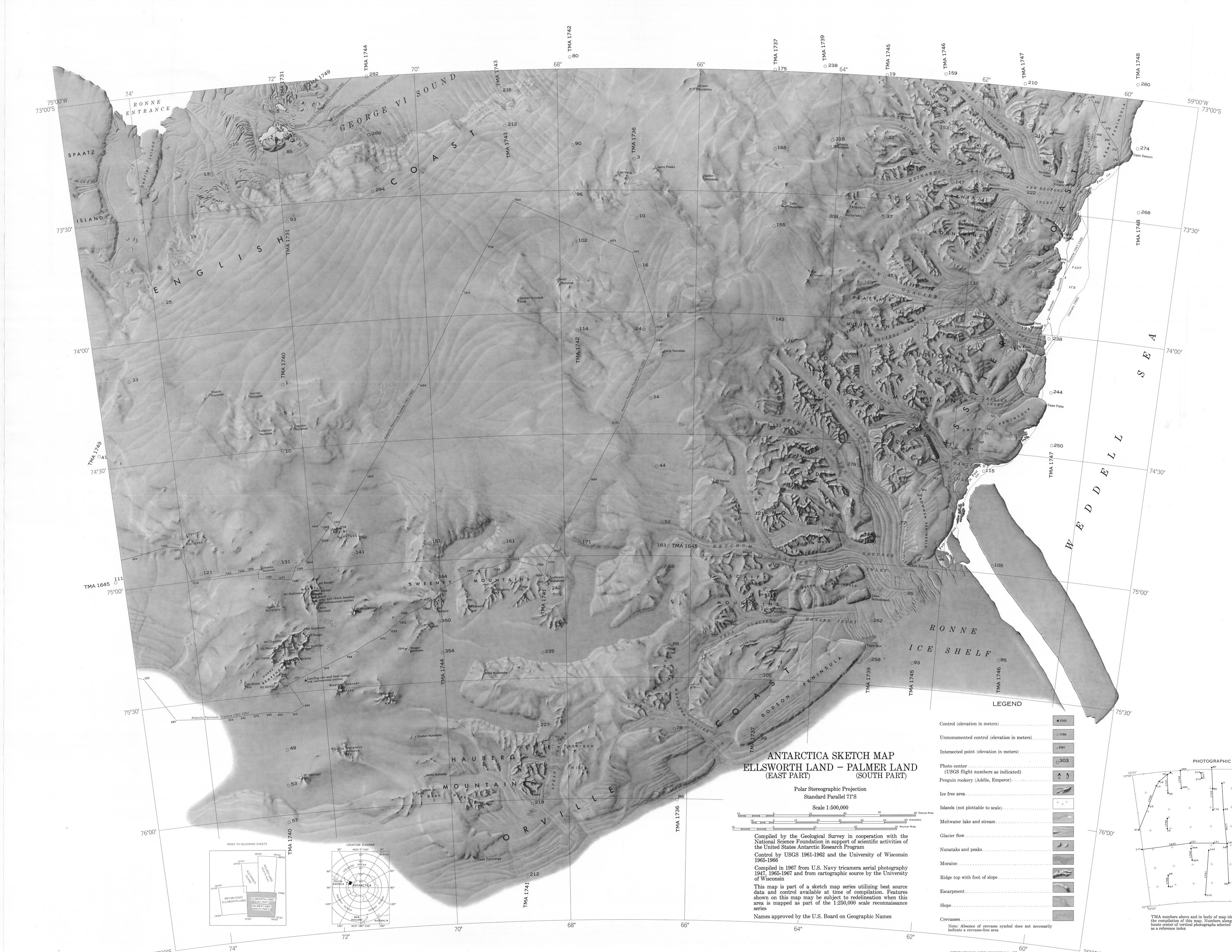
Eastern Ellsworth Land (south), Southern Palmer Land (north). Gardner Inlet in center east of map.

Gardner inlet is between the Lassiter Coast and the Orville Coast of the Weddell Sea to the east. (Note: Alberts (1995) says in the entry for Brown Glacier that Garner Inlet is on the Lassiter Coast, Palmer Land. The Lassiter Coast extends south from Cape Mackintosh to Cape Adams, north of the mouth of Gardner Inlet. The Orville Coast extends from Cape Adams southeast to Cape Zumberge. The Gardner Inlet is therefore between the Lassiter Coast and the Orville Coast) It is at the southeast end of the base of the Antarctic Peninsula, which is defined as a line between Cape Adams at the mouth of the inlet and a point on the mainland coast south of Eklund Islands. It therefore lies on the boundary between Palmer Land to the north and Ellsworth Land to the south.

Gardner Inlet is separated from Hansen Inlet to the southwest by Cape Schlossbach. Both inlets are ice-covered, and join the Ronne Ice Shelf on the coast. The Scaife Mountains are to the east of Gardner Inlet, separated from the Latady Mountains to the northeast by the Ketchum Glacier, which flows into the inlet from the west. The Strange Glacier joins the Ketchum Glacier from the north near its mouth in the inlet south of Mount Austin. The Wetmore Glacier is joined by the Irvine Glacier and flows from the north into Gardner Inlet. Bowman Peninsula terminating in Cape Adams defines the northeastern side of the inlet.

== Discovery and name ==
Gardner Inlet was discovered by the Ronne Antarctic Research Expedition (RARE), 1947–48, under Finn Ronne. He named it for Irvine Clifton Gardner, a physicist at the National Bureau of Standards, and member of the American Antarctic Association, Inc., the organization set up to make plans and preparations for the expedition. His work in the field of optics as applied to aerial photography has been an important contribution to this technique in polar exploration.

== Glaciers ==
=== Ketchum Glacier ===
75°00′S 63°45′W. Eastward flowing glacier at the base of Palmer Land, about 50 nautical miles (93 km; 58 mi) long, descending between the Latady Mountains and Scaife Mountains into Gardner Inlet. Discovered by the RARE, 1947-48, under Ronne, who named it for Commander Gerald Ketchum, United States Navy, commander of the icebreaker Burton Island which broke the ice to free the RARE from Marguerite Bay for the return home. (Note: Ketchum Glacier enters Gardner Inlet opposite Cape Adams. Alberts (1995) says Palmer Land is the southern part of the Antarctic Peninsula, which extends north from Cape Adams, the Scaife Mountains are in Ellsworth Land and the Latady Mountains to the north of Ketchum Glacier are in Palmer Land. The Ketchum Glacier therefore forms the boundary between Palmer Land to the north and Ellsworth Land to the south in this area.)

=== Brown Glacier ===
74°50′S 65°08′W. A large glacier on the west side of Latady Mountains, flowing south-southeast to join Ketchum Glacier, west of Gardner Inlet on the Lassiter Coast. Mapped by the United States Geological Survey (USGS) from surveys and United States Navy aerial photographs, 1961-67. Named by the United States Advisory Committee on Antarctic Names (US-ACAN) after Lawrence Edward Brown, geologist; member of the USGS field party which crossed this glacier, 1969-70.

=== Strange Glacier ===
74°50′S 63°40′W. A glacier in the Latady Mountains, draining southeast along the south side of Grain Ridge to enter Gardner Inlet between Schmitt Mesa and Mount Austin. Mapped by USGS from surveys and United States Navy air photos, 1961-67. Named by US-ACAN for Donald L. Strange, hospital corpsman at South Pole Station in 1964.

=== Wetmore Glacier ===
74°38′S 63°35′W. Glacier about 40 nautical miles (74 km; 46 mi) long, flowing southeast between the Rare Range and Latady Mountains into the north part of Gardner Inlet. Discovered by the RARE, 1947–48, under Ronne, who named this feature for Alexander Wetmore, Secretary of the Smithsonian Institution, who assisted Ronne in laying out the scientific research program of the expedition.

=== Irvine Glacier ===
74°42′S 63°15′W. A glacier, 40 nautical miles (74 km; 46 mi) long, draining southeast between the Guettard Range and Rare Range into the north part of Gardner Inlet. Discovered by the RARE, 1947-48, under Ronne, who named it for George J. Irvine, of the Engineer Depot at Fort Belvoir, VA, who outlined the RARE photographic program.

== Other features ==
=== Mount Austin ===
74°53′S 63°10′W. Conspicuous rock mass rising to 955 metres (3,133 ft) high, projecting into the head of Gardner Inlet. Discovered by the RARE, 1947-48, under Ronne, and named by him for Stephen F. Austin, American colonizer in Texas and one of the founders of the Republic of Texas.

=== Bowman Peninsula ===
74°47′S 62°22′W. A peninsula, 25 nautical miles (46 km; 29 mi) long in a north–south direction and 15 nautical miles (28 km; 17 mi) wide in its north and central portions, lying between Nantucket Inlet and Gardner Inlet on the east coast of Palmer Land. The peninsula is ice covered and narrows toward the south, terminating in Cape Adams. Discovered by the RARE, 1947-48, under Ronne, who named it for Isaiah Bowman.

=== Cape Adams ===
75°04′S 62°20′W. Abrupt rock scarp marking the south tip of Bowman Peninsula and forming the north side of the entrance to Gardner Inlet. Discovered by the RARE, 1947–48, under Ronne, and named by him for Lieutenant Charles J. Adams of the then United States ArmyAF, pilot with the expedition.

=== Cape Schlossbach ===
75°08′S 63°06′W. Cape forming the east end of Prehn Peninsula, located between Gardner Inlet and Hansen Inlet on the east side of the base of the Antarctic Peninsula. Discovered by the RARE under Ronne, 1947-48, who named it for Commander Isaac Schlossbach, United States Navy (Ret.), second-incommand of the expedition and commander of the ship Port of Beaumont, Texas.

== Sources ==
- Alberts, Fred G., ed. (1995), Geographic Names of the Antarctic (PDF) (2 ed.), United States Board on Geographic Names This article incorporates public domain material from websites or documents of the United States Board on Geographic Names.
- Ellsworth Land - Palmer Land, USGS: United States Geological Survey

This article incorporates public domain material from websites or documents of the United States Geological Survey.
