= Lyon Nunataks =

Nunatak group in Palmer Land, Antarctica

- Location within Antarctica

Geography
- Continent: Antarctica
- Range coordinates: 74°50′S 73°50′W

The Lyon Nunataks (74°50′S 73°50′W) are a group of nunataks lying west of the Grossman Nunataks and 30 nautical miles (56 km; 35 mi) northwest of the Behrendt Mountains, in Ellsworth Land, Antarctica. They include Grossenbacher Nunatak, Holtet Nunatak, Christoph Nunatak and Isakson Nunatak.

== Location ==
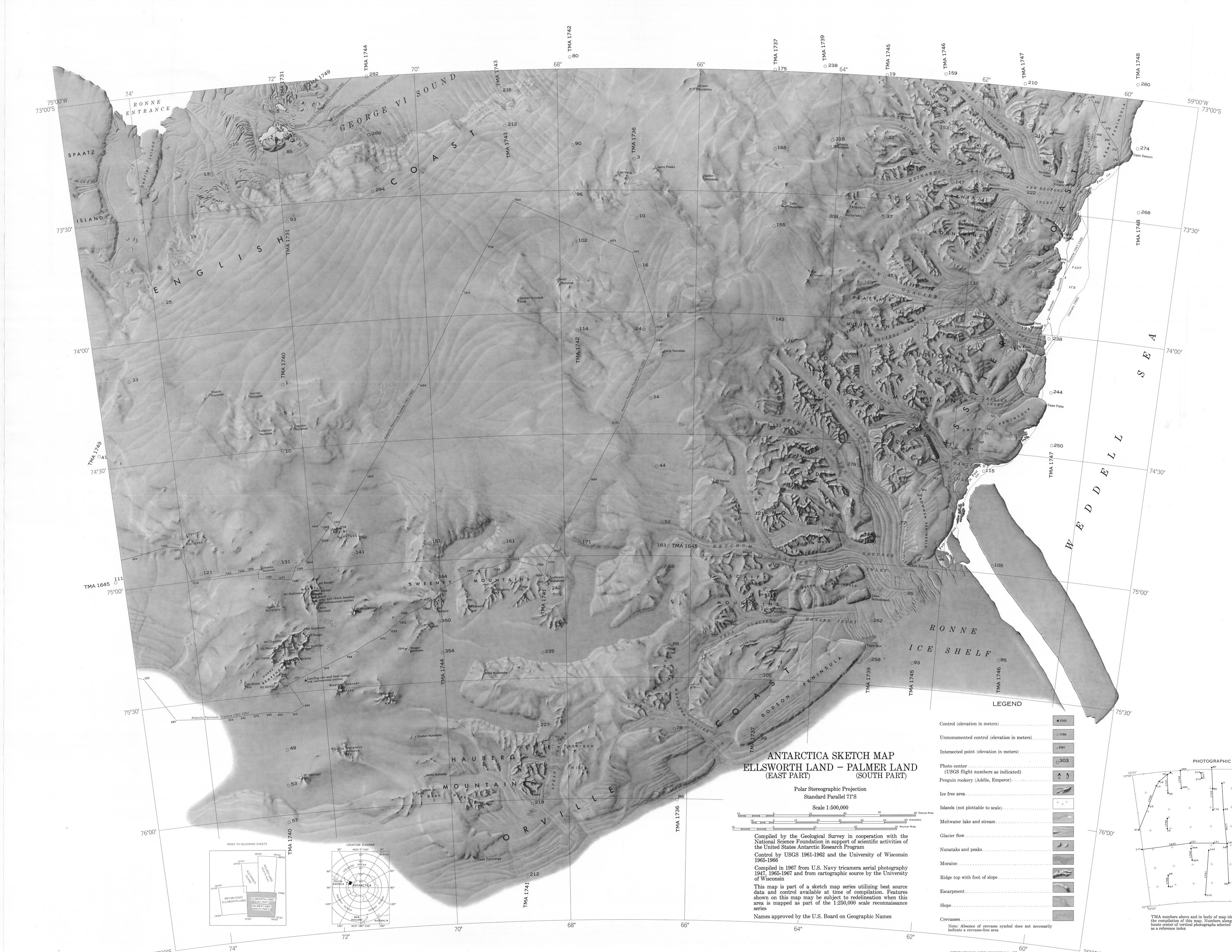
Eastern Ellsworth Land (south), Southern Palmer Land (north). Lyon Nunataks in southwest of map.

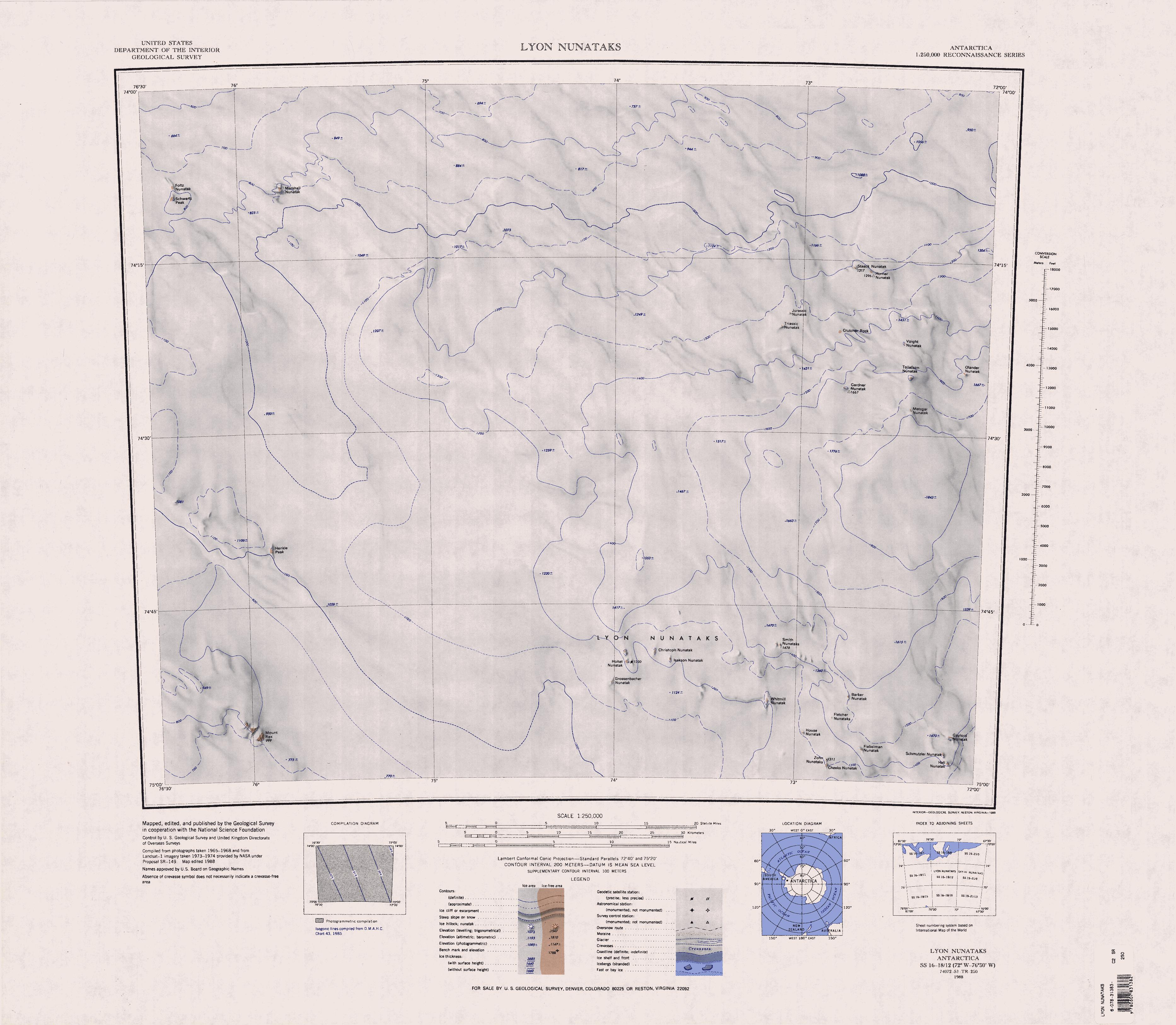
Topographic map of the Lyon Nunataks.

The Lyon Nunataks are in eastern Ellsworth Land to the northwest of the Merrick Mountains and north-northwest of the Behrendt Mountains, They are southwest of the Yee Nunataks. They are west of the Grossman Nunataks. Features, from west to east, include Grossenbacher Nunatak, Holtet Nunatak, Christoph Nunatak and Isakson Nunatak. Foltz Nunatak, Schwartz Peak and Marshall Nunatak are to the northwest, Mount Rex and Henkle Peak are to the west.

== Mapping and name ==
The Lyon Nunataks were mapped by the United States Geological Survey (USGS) from surveys and United States Navy air photographs, 1961–67. They were named by the United States Advisory Committee on Antarctic Names (US-ACAN) after Owen R. Lyon, hospital corpsman, United States Navy, chief petty officer in charge of Eights Station in 1965.

== Features ==
=== Grossenbacher Nunatak ===
74°52′S 74°01′W. A nunatak at the southwest end of Lyon Nunataks, 2 nautical miles (3.7 km; 2.3 mi) southwest of Holtet Nunatak. Named by US-ACAN after Ernest P. Grossenbacher, upper atmospheric physicist, Siple Station, 1970-71.

=== Holtet Nunatak ===
74°50′S 73°56′W. A nunatak rising to about 1,300 metres (4,300 ft) high, 2 nautical miles (3.7 km; 2.3 mi) northeast of Grossenbacher Nunatak. Mapped by USGS from aerial photographs taken by the United States Navy, 1965-68, and from Landsat imagery taken 1973-74. Named in 1987 by US-ACAN after Jan A. Holtet of the Norwegian Institute of Cosmic Physics, upper atmospheric physicist at Siple Station, 1970-71.

=== Christoph Nunatak ===
74°49′S 73°47′W. A nunatak rising to about 1,300 metres (4,300 ft) high, 2.5 nautical miles (4.6 km; 2.9 mi) east-northeast of Holtet Nunatak. Mapped by USGS from United States Navy aerial photographs taken 1965-68 and Landsat imagery taken 1973-74. Named by US-ACAN in 1987 after Klaus J. Christoph, upper atmospheric physicist at Siple Station, 1970-71.

=== Isakson Nunatak ===
74°50′S 73°42′W. Nunatak rising to about 1,300 metres (4,300 ft) high, 1.5 nautical miles (2.8 km; 1.7 mi) southeast of Christoph Nunatak. Mapped by USGS from surveys and United States Navy aerial photographs, 1961-68, and Landsat imagery, 1973-74. Named by US-ACAN in 1987 after Steve W. Isakson of Stanford University, Stanford, CA, upper atmospheric physicist at Siple Station, winter party 1975.

== Western features ==
=== Mount Rex ===
74°54′S 75°57′W. An isolated mountain 1,105 metres (3,625 ft) high which rises above the interior ice surface of Ellsworth Land about 55 nautical miles (102 km; 63 mi) south-southeast of FitzGerald Bluffs. Discovered and photographed from the air on November 23, 1935 by Lincoln Ellsworth (Geographical Review, July 1936, p. 459, Fig. 16). The feature was resighted by the Ronne Antarctic Research Expedition (RARE; 1947–48) under Finn Ronne, who named it for Lieutenant Commander Daniel F. Rex, United States Navy, of the Office of Naval Research, who made important contributions to the planning of the scientific research program and the equipping of the expedition.

=== Henkle Peak ===
74°39′S 75°50′W. A peak about 15 nautical miles (28 km; 17 mi) north of Mount Rex in Ellsworth Land. It lies among a group of nunataks that were first sighted and photographed by Lincoln Ellsworth on November 23, 1935. The peak was mapped by USGS from surveys and United States Navy air photos, 1961-66. Named by US-ACAN for Charles R. Henkle of USGS, topographic engineer with the Marie Byrd Land Survey Party, 1967-68.

== Sources ==
- Alberts, Fred G., ed. (1995), Geographic Names of the Antarctic (PDF) (2 ed.), United States Board on Geographic Names This article incorporates public domain material from websites or documents of the United States Board on Geographic Names.
- Ellsworth Land - Palmer Land, USGS: United States Geological Survey
- Lyon Nunataks, USGS: United States Geological Survey

This article incorporates public domain material from websites or documents of the United States Geological Survey.
