= Jaeger Hills =

Group of mountains in Palmer Land, Antarctica

The Jaeger Hills (75°30′S 65°40′W) are a group of hills and nunataks, rising to about 1,000 metres (3,300 ft) and running northeast–southwest for 24 miles (39 km) between Matthews Glacier and McCaw Ridge on the Orville Coast of Palmer Land, Antarctica. The feature was mapped by the United States Geological Survey (USGS) from surveys and U.S. Navy aerial photographs, 1961–67. It was visited in 1977–78 by a USGS geological party, led by Peter D. Rowley, and named after Commander James W. Jaeger, U.S. Navy, Commanding Officer of Antarctic Development Squadron Six, 1977–78, and command pilot of the LC-130 aircraft in support of the USGS party.
