= Grossman Nunataks =

Nunatak group in Palmer Land, Antarctica

- Location within Antarctica

Geography
- Continent: Antarctica
- Range coordinates: 74°55′S 72°40′W

The Grossman Nunataks (74°55′S 72°40′W) are a group of about a dozen nunataks in Ellsworth Land, Antarctica, rising 1,300–1,500 metres (4,300–4,900 ft) in elevation and running northwest–southeast for 18 nautical miles (33 km; 21 mi) between the Lyon Nunataks and the Sky-Hi Nunataks. The group includes features from the Smith Nunataks and the Whitmill Nunatak in the northwest to Gaylord Nunatak and Neff Nunatak in the southeast.

== Location ==
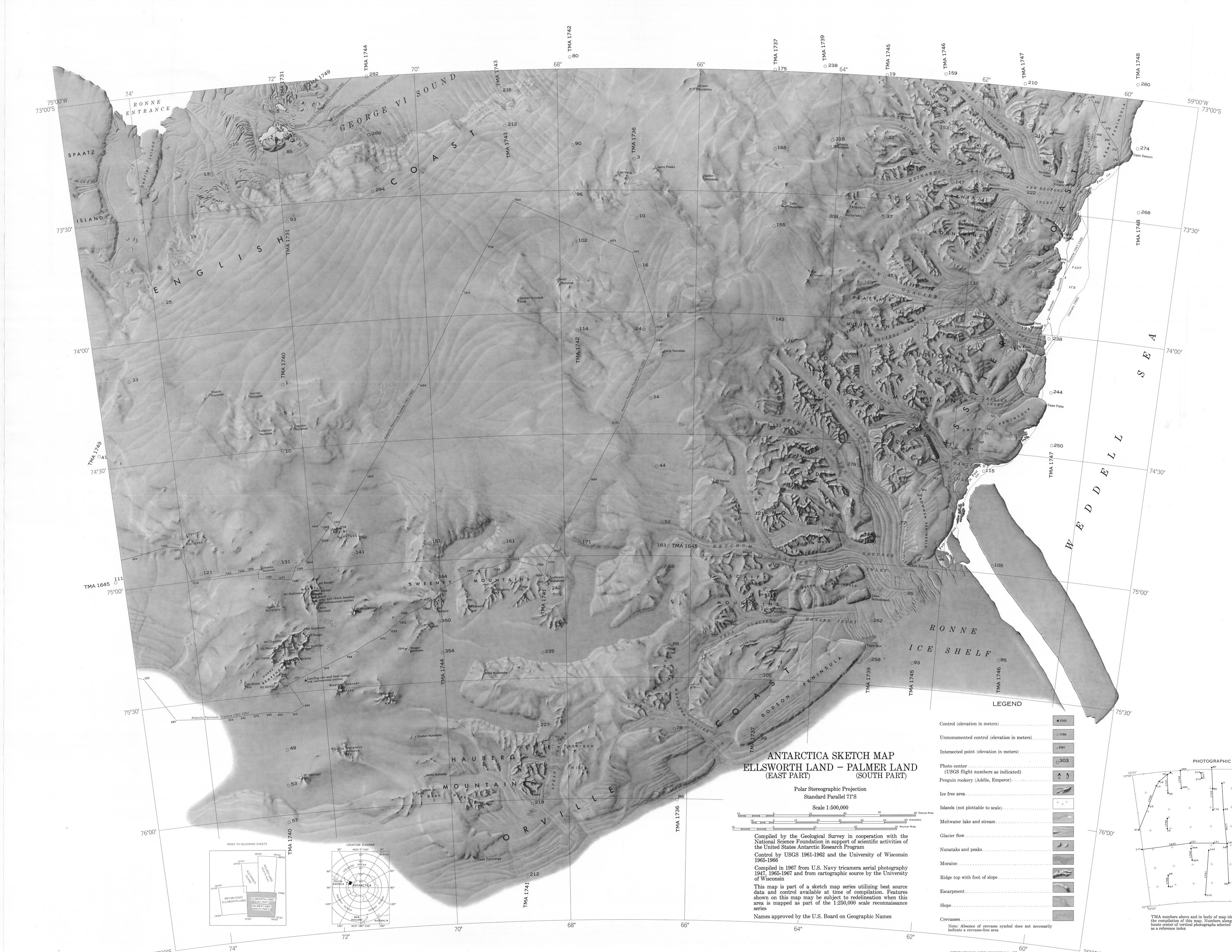
Eastern Ellsworth Land (south), Southern Palmer Land (north). Cheeks Nunatak (in Grossman Nunataks) in southwest of map.

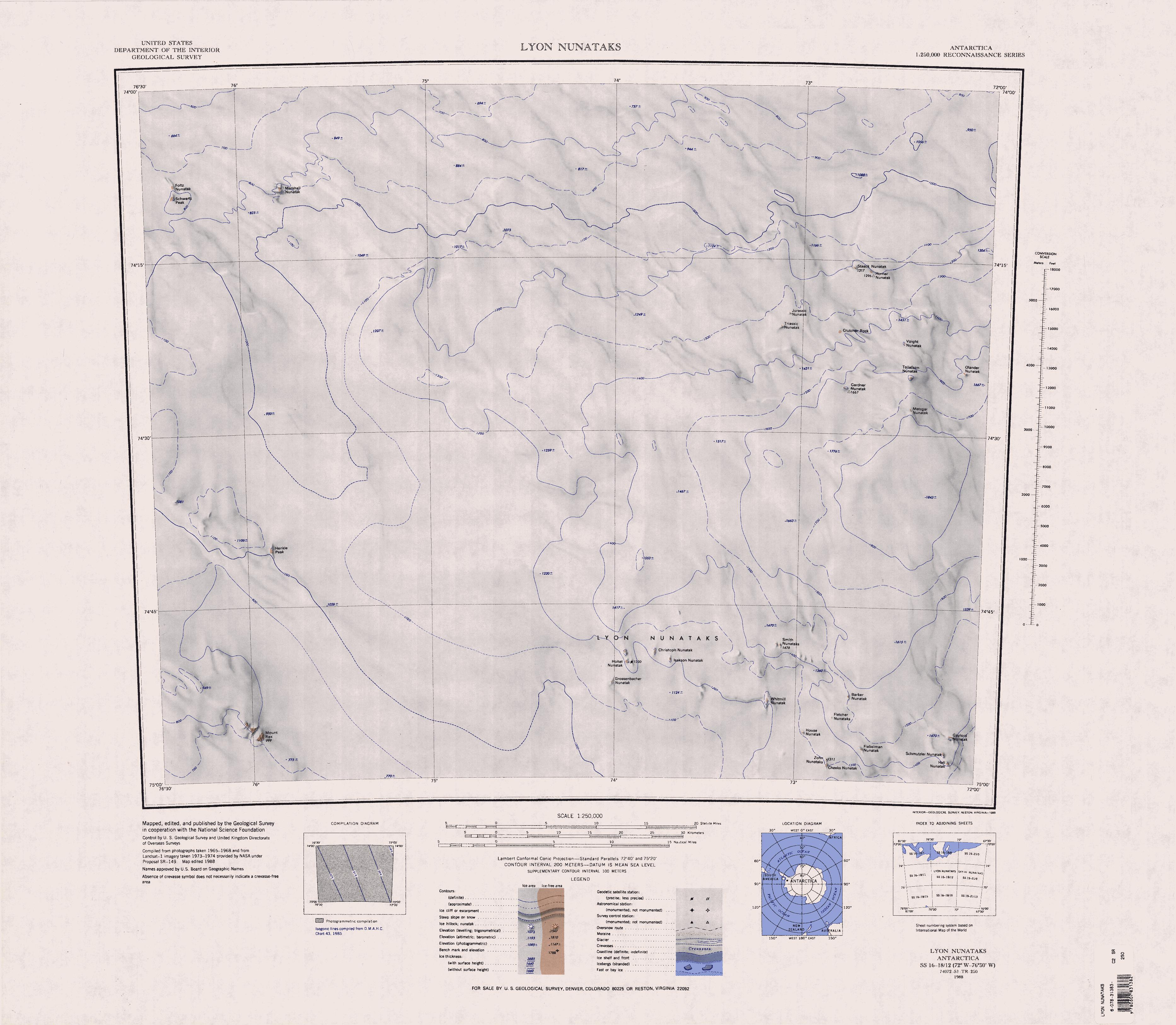
Grossman Nunataks to the southeast of the map

The Grossman Nunataks are in southwestern Ellsworth Land to the northwest of Merrick Mountains and the southeast of Lyon Nunataks. Features, from northwest to southeast, include Smith Nunataks, Whitmill Nunatak, House Nunatak, Fletcher Nunataks, Barker Nunatak, Zohn Nunataks, Cheeks Nunatak, Fiebelman Nunatak, Schmutzler Nunatak and Gaylord Nunatak.

== Mapping and name ==
The Grossman Nunataks were mapped by the United States Geological Survey (USGS) from surveys and United States Navy aerial photographs, 1961–68, and from United States Landsat imagery, 1973–74. They were named by the United States Advisory Committee on Antarctic Names (US-ACAN) in 1994 after Charles Grossman, formerly Chief of the Shaded Relief and Special Graphics Unit, Branch of Special Maps, USGS, a specialist in the production of maps of Antarctica.

== Features ==
=== Smith Nunataks ===
74°48′S 73°06′W. Two nunataks close together, lying 5 nautical miles (9.3 km; 5.8 mi) north-northeast of Whitmill Nunatak in the northwest part of Grossman Nunataks. Mapped by USGS from surveys and United States Navy aerial photographs, 1961-68, and Landsat imagery, 1973-74. Named in 1987 by US-ACAN after Thomas T. Smith, USGS cartographer, a member of the field party on Byrd Glacier and Darwin Glacier, 1978-79.

=== Whitmill Nunatak ===
74°53′S 73°09′W. One of the Grossman Nunataks, lying in the west part of the group 5 nautical miles (9.3 km; 5.8 mi) south-southwest of Smith Nunataks. Mapped by USGS from surveys and United States Navy aerial photographs, 1961-68. Named by US-ACAN in 1987 after Leland D. Whitmill, USGS cartographer, a member of the field party on Darwin Glacier and Byrd Glacier, 1978-79.

=== House Nunatak ===
74°56′S 72°57′W. One of the Grossman Nunataks, located 4 nautical miles (7.4 km; 4.6 mi) southeast of Whitmill Nunatak. Named by US-ACAN after John R. House, USGS cartographer, who worked in the field at South Pole Station and Byrd Station, 1972-73.

=== Fletcher Nunataks ===
74°54′S 72°47′W. Two nunataks lying 2.2 nautical miles (4.1 km; 2.5 mi) southwest of Barker Nunatak. Mapped by USGS from United States Navy aerial photographs taken 1965-68 and Landsat imagery taken 1973-74. Named by US-ACAN after James B. Fletcher, USGS cartographic technician who, with Kenneth Barker, formed the USGS satellite surveying team at South Pole Station, winter party 1977.

=== Barker Nunatak ===
74°53′S 72°42′W. One of the Grossman Nunataks, located 2.2 nautical miles (4.1 km; 2.5 mi) northeast of Fletcher Nunataks. Named by US-ACAN after Kenneth Barker, USGS cartographer who, with James B. Fletcher, formed the USGS satellite surveying team at South Pole Station, winter party 1977.

=== Zohn Nunataks ===
74°58′S 72°49′W. Three nunataks, the largest being Cheeks Nunatak, rising to 1,310 metres (4,300 ft) high in the southwest part of Grossman Nunataks. Mapped by USGS from surveys and United States Navy aerial photographs, 1961-68, and Landsat imagery, 1973-74. Named by US-ACAN after Harry L. Zohn, Jr., USGS topographic engineer, a member of the USGS-BAS geological party to the Orville Coast, 1977-78.

=== Cheeks Nunatak ===
74°58′S 72°49′W. The largest and southernmost of three nunataks located 12 nautical miles (22 km; 14 mi) |northwest of Merrick Mountains. Mapped by USGS from surveys and United States Navy air photos, 1961-67. Named by US-ACAN for Noble L. Cheeks, aviation electronics technician, member of the R4D party that flew to the vicinity of the eventual Eights Station in 1961 to set up a base camp.

=== Fiebelman Nunatak ===
74°57′S 72°37′W. One of the Grossman Nunataks, lying 3.5 nautical miles (6.5 km; 4.0 mi) east-northeast of Cheeks Nunatak. Mapped by, USGS from United States Navy aerial photographs taken 1965-68. Named in 1987 by US-ACAN after Harold E. Fiebelman, USGS cartographer, who worked in the field at Byrd Station and South Pole Station, 1972-73.

=== Schmutzler Nunatak ===
74°57′S 72°10′W. A nunatak rising to about 1,500 metres (4,900 ft) high, located 1 nautical mile (1.9 km; 1.2 mi) northwest of Neff Nunatak and 1.5 nautical miles (2.8 km; 1.7 mi) south-southwest of Gaylord Nunatak. Mapped by USGS from United States Navy aerial photographs taken 1965-68. Named in 1987 by US-ACAN after Robin A. Schmutzler, USGS cartographer, a member of the joint USGS-BAS geological party to Orville Coast, 1977-78.

=== Neff Nunatak ===
74°58′S 72°08′W. A nunatak rising to about 1,500 metres (4,900 ft) high, located 1 nautical mile (1.9 km; 1.2 mi) southeast of Schmutzler Nunatak. Mapped by USGS from United States Navy aerial photographs taken 1965-68. Named by US-ACAN in 1988 after Richard J. Neff, USGS cartographer, a member of the winter party at Australia's Casey Station, 1975.

=== Gaylord Nunatak ===
74°56′S 72°08′W. A nunatak rising to about 1,500 metres (4,900 ft) high, 1.5 nautical miles (2.8 km; 1.7 mi) north-northeast of Schmutzler Nunatak in the southeast end of the Grossman Nunataks. Mapped by USGS from surveys and United States Navy aerial photographs, 1961-68, and Landsat imagery, 1973-74. Named by US-ACAN in 1987 after Chauncey L. Gaylord, USGS cartographer, 1942-76, Chief of the Compilation Unit in the Branch of Special Maps, working for many years in the preparation of Antarctic maps.

== Sources ==
- Alberts, Fred G., ed. (1995), Geographic Names of the Antarctic (PDF) (2 ed.), United States Board on Geographic Names This article incorporates public domain material from websites or documents of the United States Board on Geographic Names.
- Ellsworth Land - Palmer Land, USGS: United States Geological Survey
- Lyon Nunataks, USGS: United States Geological Survey

This article incorporates public domain material from websites or documents of the United States Geological Survey.
