= Hauberg Mountains =

Group of mountains in Ellsworth Land, Antarctica

- Location within Antarctica

Geography
- Continent: Antarctica
- Range coordinates: 75°52′S 069°15′W

The Hauberg Mountains (75°52′S 069°15′W) are a group of mountains of about 35 nautical miles (65 km; 40 mi) extent, located 12 nautical miles (22 km; 14 mi) north of Cape Zumberge and 30 nautical miles (56 km; 35 mi) south of the Sweeney Mountains in eastern Ellsworth Land, Antarctica.

== Location ==
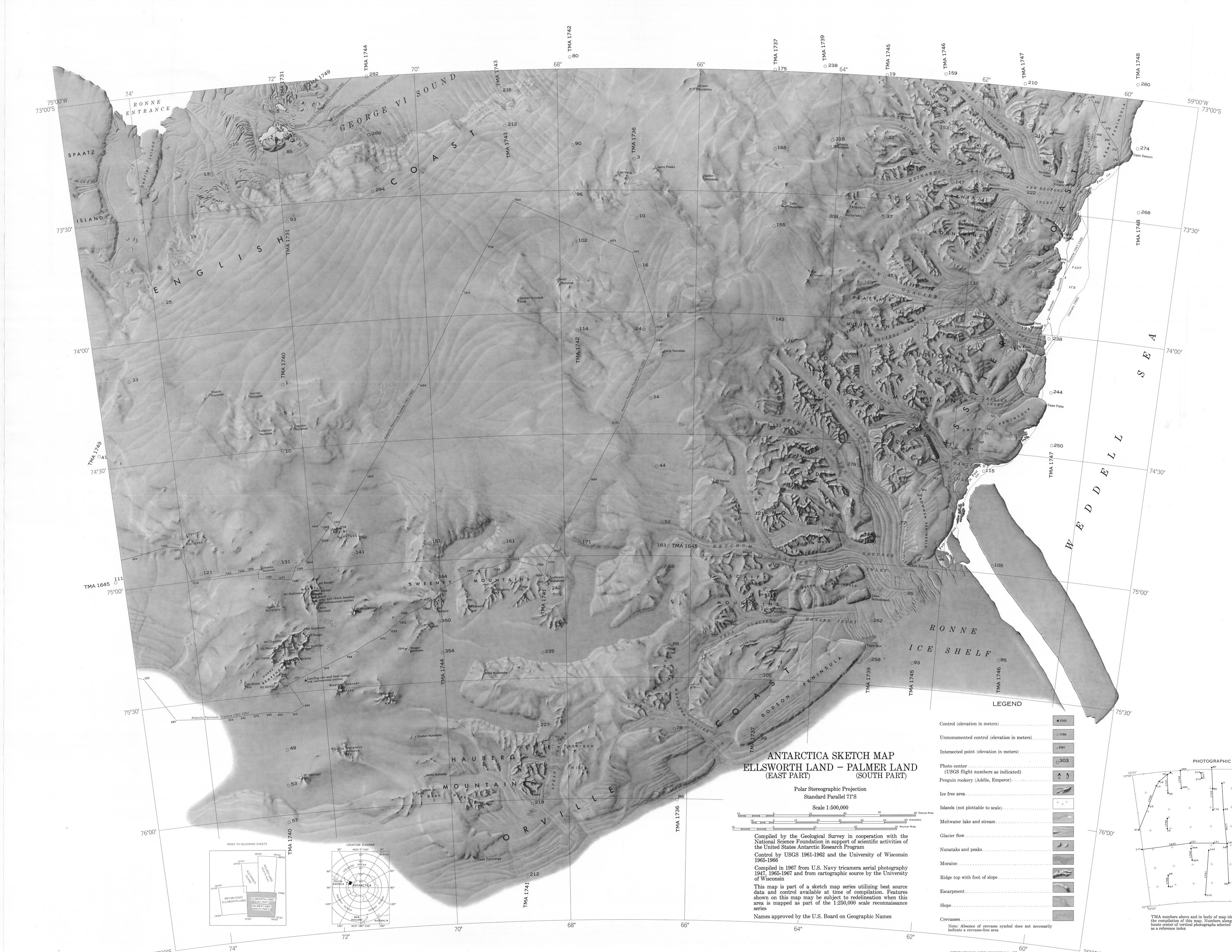
Eastern Ellsworth Land (south), Southern Palmer Land (north). Hauberg Mountains in southwest of map.

The Hauberg Mountains are in the southeast of Ellsworth Land just north of the Orville Coast. They are southeast of the Behrendt Mountains and south of the Sweeney Mountains. Eastern features, from north to south, include Shelton Nunataks, Janke Nunatak, Bean Peaks, Carlson Peak, Novocin Peak and Cape Zumberge. Western features include Mount Leek and Mount Dewe, separated by the Spear Glacier from the Peterson Hills and Wilkins Mountains. The Witte Nunataks are to the north.

== Discovery and name ==
The Hauberg Mountains were discovered by the Ronne Antarctic Research Expedition (RARE), 1947–48, led by Finn Ronne, and named by him for John Hauberg, of Rock Island, Illinois, a contributor to the expedition.

== Western features ==
=== Janke Nunatak ===
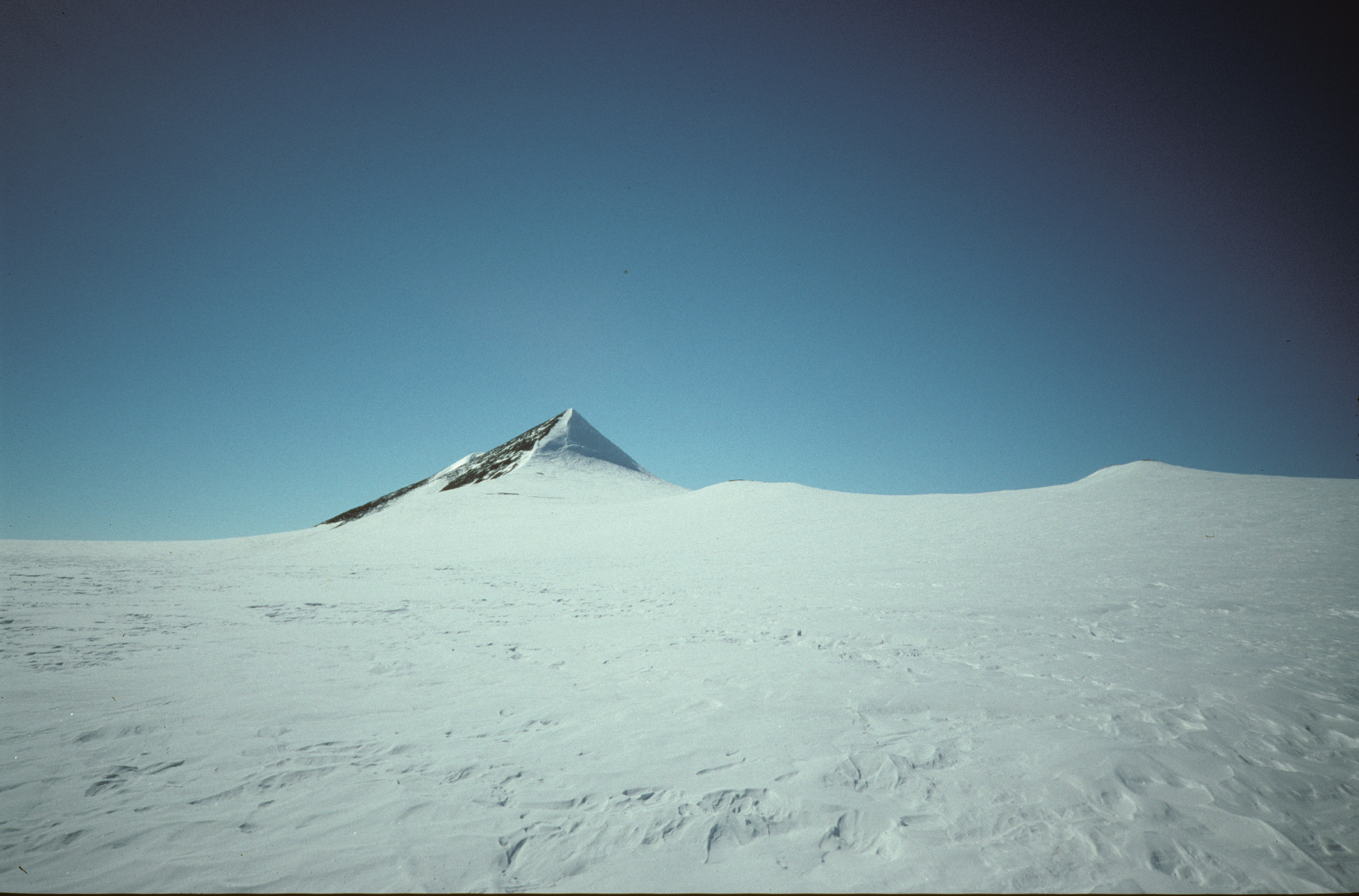
Janke Nunatak

75°53′S 70°27′W. An isolated nunatak, 4 nautical miles (7.4 km; 4.6 mi) northeast of Carlson Peak in western Hauberg Mountains. Mapped by the United States Geological Survey (USGS) from surveys and United States Navy air photos, 1961-67. Named by the United States Advisory Committee on Antarctic Names (US-ACAN) for John W. Janke, radioman with the Eights Station winter party in 1964.

=== Srite Glacier ===
76°00′S 69°00′W. A glacier over 20 nautical miles (37 km; 23 mi) long, flowing east and southeast from Janke Nunatak to the Orville Coast, west of Spear Glacier. The feature was mapped by USGS from surveys and United States Navy aerial photographs, 1961-67, and was visited by a USGS geological party, 1977-78, led by Peter D. Rowley. Named by US-ACAN after Commander (later Captain) David A. Srite, United States Navy, chief navigator of an LC-130 aircraft in support of the geological party in this area, 1977-78; Commanding Officer, Antarctic Development Squadron Six, 1979 to 1980; Commanding Officer, Naval Support Force, Antarctica, 1985 to 1987.

=== Bean Peaks ===
75°58′S 70°00′W. A group of peaks including Carlson Peak and Novocin Peak, which form the southwest part of the Hauberg Mountains. First sighted from the air by the RARE, 1947-48. Mapped by USGS from ground surveys and United States Navy air photos, 1961-67. Named by US-ACAN for Lawrence D. Bean, electrician with the South Pole Station winter party in 1967.

=== Carlson Peak ===
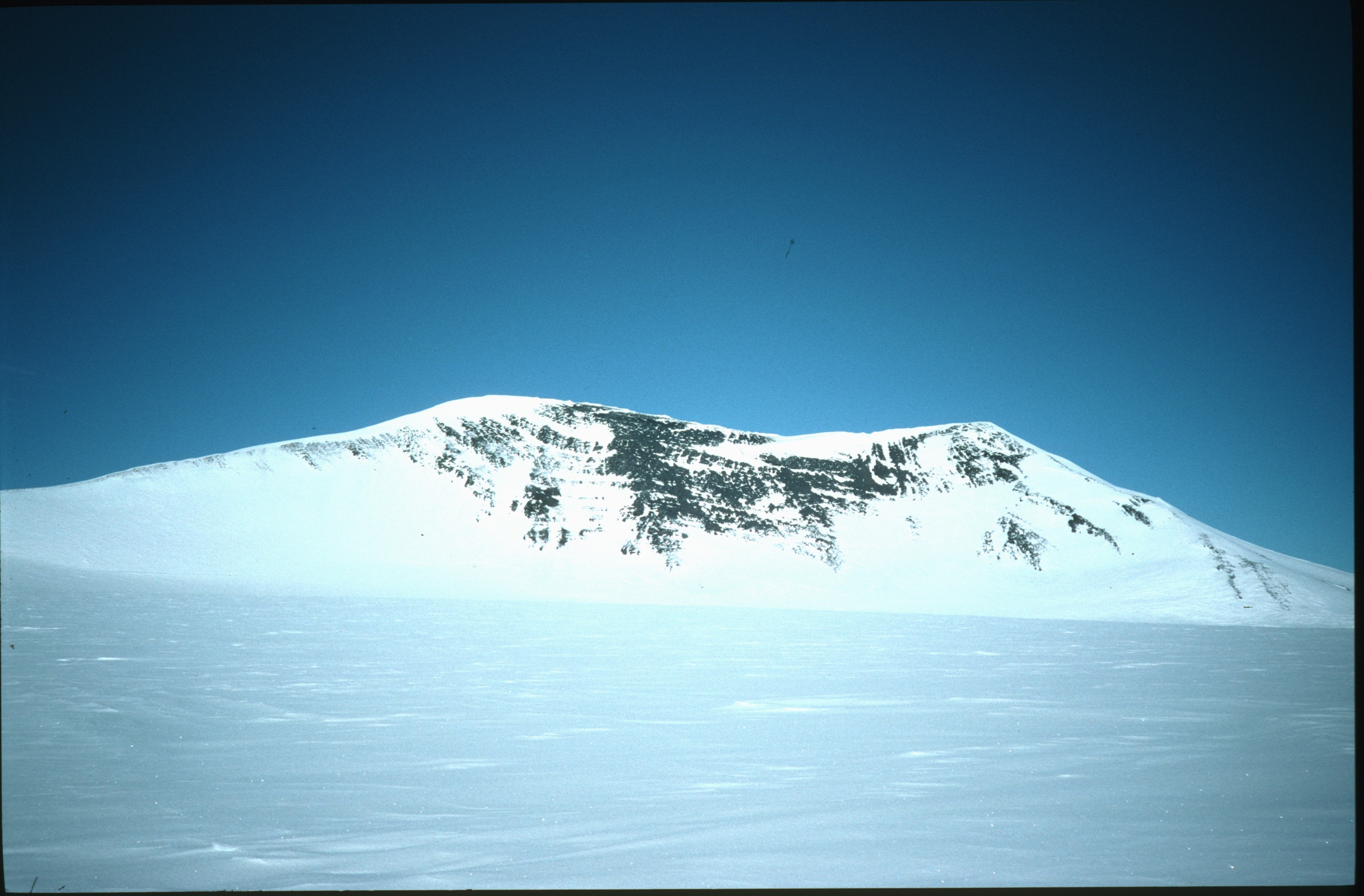
Carlson Peak seen from northeast

75°57′S 70°33′W. One of the Bean Peaks. Mapped by USGS from ground surveys and United States Navy air photos, 1961-67. Named by US-ACAN for Paul R. Carlson, meteorologist at Byrd Station, summer 1965-66.

=== Novocin Peak ===
76°01′S 69°33′W. One of the Bean Peaks, located near the southeast end of this group. First observed from aircraft by the RARE, 1947-48. Mapped by USGS from surveys and United States Navy air photos, 1961-67. Named by US-ACAN for Norbert W. Novocin, meteorologist at Byrd Station, summer 1965-66.

== Eastern features ==
=== Mount Dewe ===
75°58′S 68°39′W. Mountain in the southeast part of the Hauberg Mountains. Mapped by USGS from ground surveys and United States Navy air photos, 1961-67. Named by US-ACAN for Michael B. Dewe, glaciologist at Byrd Station, summer 1965-66.

=== Fisher Peak ===
75°52′S 68°23′W. A peak rising to about 1,100 metres (3,600 ft) high, 5 nautical miles (9.3 km; 5.8 mi) southeast of Mount Leek. Mapped by USGS from surveys and United States Navy aerial photographs, 1961-67. Climbed in December 1977 by members of a USGS field party. Named by US-ACAN in 1985 after Commander Dwight D. Fisher, United States Navy, command pilot on the first landing by LC-130 Hercules aircraft on English Coast in December 1984; Commanding Officer, United States Navy Antarctic Development Squadron Six (VXE-6), from May 1984 to May 1985; Commanding Officer, NSFA, 1987-89; Naval Officer on detail to NSF, 1989-92; Deputy Manager, Polar Operations Section, Office of Polar Programs, NSF, from 1992.

=== Mount Leek ===
75°49′S 68°31′W. A mountain standing west of Spear Glacier in the northeast part of the Hauberg Mountains. First observed from the air by the RARE, 1947-48. Mapped by USGS from surveys and United States Navy air photos, 1961-67. Named by US-ACAN for Gouke M. Leek, glaciologist at Byrd Station, summer 1965-66.

=== Morgan Peak ===
75°47′S 68°24′W. A peak rising to about 1,100 metres (3,600 ft) high, located 3 nautical miles (5.6 km; 3.5 mi) northeast of Mount Leek. Named by US-ACAN in 1985 after Commander William A. Morgan, United States Navy, command pilot of an LC-130 aircraft in support of a USGS geological party to this area, 1977-78; Commanding Officer, Antarctic Development Squadron Six (VXE-6), May 1978 to May 1979.

== Nearby features ==
=== Cape Zumberge ===
76°14′S 69°40′W. A steep rock cape on the west side of the Ronne Ice Shelf, marking the southwest end of the Orville Coast. The name "Zumberge Nunatak" was given by the US-IGY party from Ellsworth Station, 1957-58, to a rock feature reported to lie 30 nautical miles (56 km; 35 mi) north of the westernmost traverse station occupied by the party. The cape described, though somewhat farther north, is apparently the only rock feature lying in that direction. Named for James H. Zumberge, American glaciologist who has made studies of the Ross Ice Shelf.

=== Spear Glacier ===
75°55′S 68°15′W. A glacier between the Hauberg Mountains and Peterson Hills. Mapped by USGS from surveys and United States Navy air photos, 1961-67. Named by US-ACAN for Milton B. Spear, construction electrician at Eights Station in 1965.

=== Peterson Hills ===
75°50′S 67°55′W. A group of hills just east of Spear Glacier, between the Hauberg Mountains and Wilkins Mountains. Mapped by USGS from surveys and United States Navy air photos, 1961-67. Named by US-ACAN for D.G. Peterson, electronics technician at South Pole Station in 1963.

=== Wilkins Mountains ===
75°32′S 66°30′W. A group of low mountains of about 20 nautical miles (37 km; 23 mi) extent, located 25 nautical miles (46 km; 29 mi) southeast of the Sweeney Mountains. Discovered by the RARE, 1947-48, under Ronne, who named these mountains for Sir Hubert Wilkins.

=== Matthews Glacier ===
75°45′S 65°30′W. A glacier on the east side of the Wilkins Mountains, draining south to enter the Ronne Ice Shelf just west of Dodson Peninsula. Mapped by the USGS from surveys and United States Navy air photos, 1961-67. Named by US-ACAN for J.D. Matthews, engineman at South Pole Station in 1963.

=== Hutchins Nunataks ===
75°39′S 68°10′W. A group of nunataks rising to about 1,200 metres (3,900 ft) high, 12 nautical miles (22 km; 14 mi) north-northeast of Mount Leek. Mapped by USGS from surveys and United States Navy aerial photographs, 1961-67. Visited in December 1977 by a USGS geological party, led by P.D. Rowley, and named after Lieutenant Commander John R. Hutchins, United States Navy, command pilot of an LC-130 aircraft in support of the party.

=== Witte Nunataks ===
75°29′S 69°22′W. Isolated nunataks about midway between the Sweeney Mountains and Hauberg Mountains. Mapped by USGS from ground surveys and United States Navy air photos, 1961-67. Named by US-ACAN for Paul F. Witte, construction mechanic with the Eights Station winter party in 1964.

=== Shelton Nunataks ===
75°43′S 70°35′W. Two isolated nunataks located 10 nautical miles (19 km; 12 mi) southeast of Thomas Mountains. Mapped by USGS from surveys and United States Navy air photos, 1961-67. Named by US-ACAN for Willard S. Shelton, electrician at Eights Station in 1964.

== Sources ==
- Alberts, Fred G., ed. (1995), Geographic Names of the Antarctic (PDF) (2 ed.), United States Board on Geographic Names This article incorporates public domain material from websites or documents of the United States Board on Geographic Names.
- Ellsworth Land - Palmer Land, USGS: United States Geological Survey

This article incorporates public domain material from websites or documents of the United States Geological Survey.
