= Cole Peninsula =

Peninsula in Antarctica

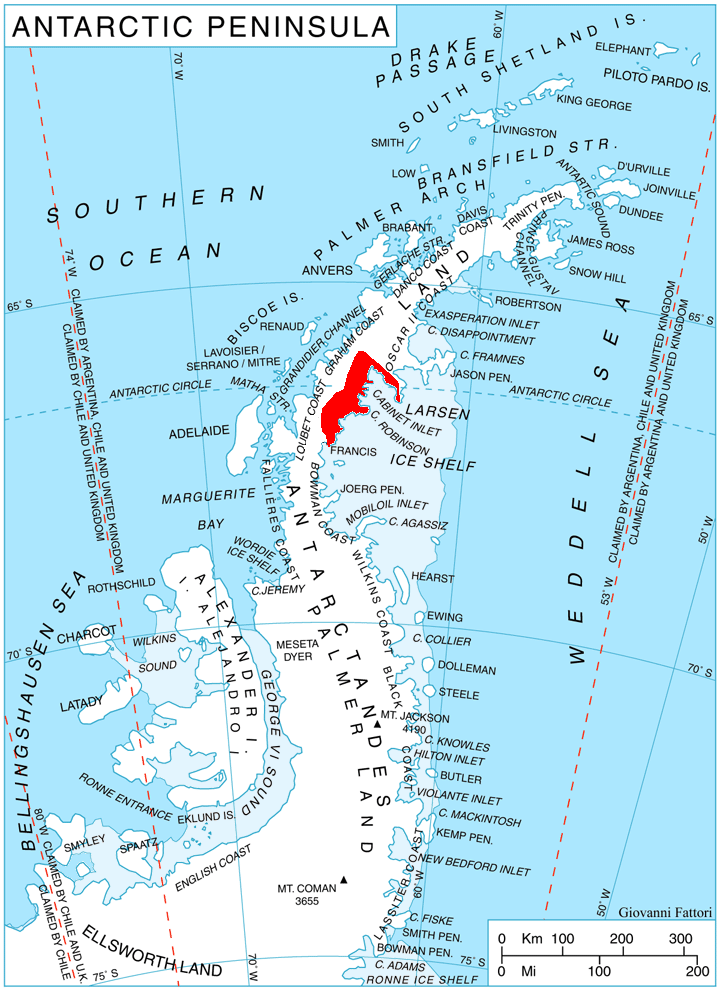
Location of Foyn Coast on Antarctic Peninsula.

Cole Peninsula (66°50′S 64°0′W) is a peninsula, 24 kilometers long in an east–west direction and 13 kilometers wide, lying between Cabinet Inlet and Mill Inlet on the east coast of Graham Land, just east of Thuronyi Bluff and immediately north of the Antarctic Circle. The peninsula is surrounded by the Larsen Ice Shelf, which is part of the Weddell Sea.

This promontory is ice-covered except for several rocky spurs which radiate from Mount Hayes. It was first sighted and photographed from the air in 1940 by members of East Base of the US Antarctic Service (USAS). During 1947 it was charted by the Falkland Islands Dependencies Survey (FIDS) and photographed from the air by the Ronne Antarctic Research Expedition (RARE) under Finn Ronne.

Cole Peninsula was named by Ronne for Rep. W. Sterling Cole of New York, member of the House Naval Affairs Committee, which assisted in obtaining Congressional support resulting in procurement of a ship for use by the Ronne expedition.

== See also ==
- Landen Ridge, narrow rock ridge at the east end of Cole Peninsula
