= Behrendt Mountains =

Group of mountains in Ellsworth Land, Antarctica

- Location within Antarctica

Geography
- Continent: Antarctica
- Range coordinates: 75°20′S 072°30′W

The Behrendt Mountains (75°20′S 72°30′W) is a group of mountains, 20 nautical miles (37 km; 23 mi) long, aligned in the form of a horseshoe with the opening to the southwest, standing 7 nautical miles (13 km; 8.1 mi) southwest of the Merrick Mountains in Ellsworth Land, Antarctica.

== Location ==
The Behrendt Mountains are in the east of Ellsworth Land to the southwest of the Merrick Mountains and northwest of the Hauberg Mountains. The Lyon Nunataks are to the northwest. Features, from southwest to northeast, include Mount Glowa, Mount Hirman, Happy Valley, Mount Trimpi, Mount Neuner, Mount Chandler, Mount Brice, Mount Abrams, Luck Nunatak, Mount Caywood, Mount Huffman, Mount Suggs and Mount Goodman. Nearby features to the south and east include Mount Hassage, Quilty Nunataks, Mount Horne, Weather Guesser Nunataks and the Thomas Mountains.

== Discovery and name ==
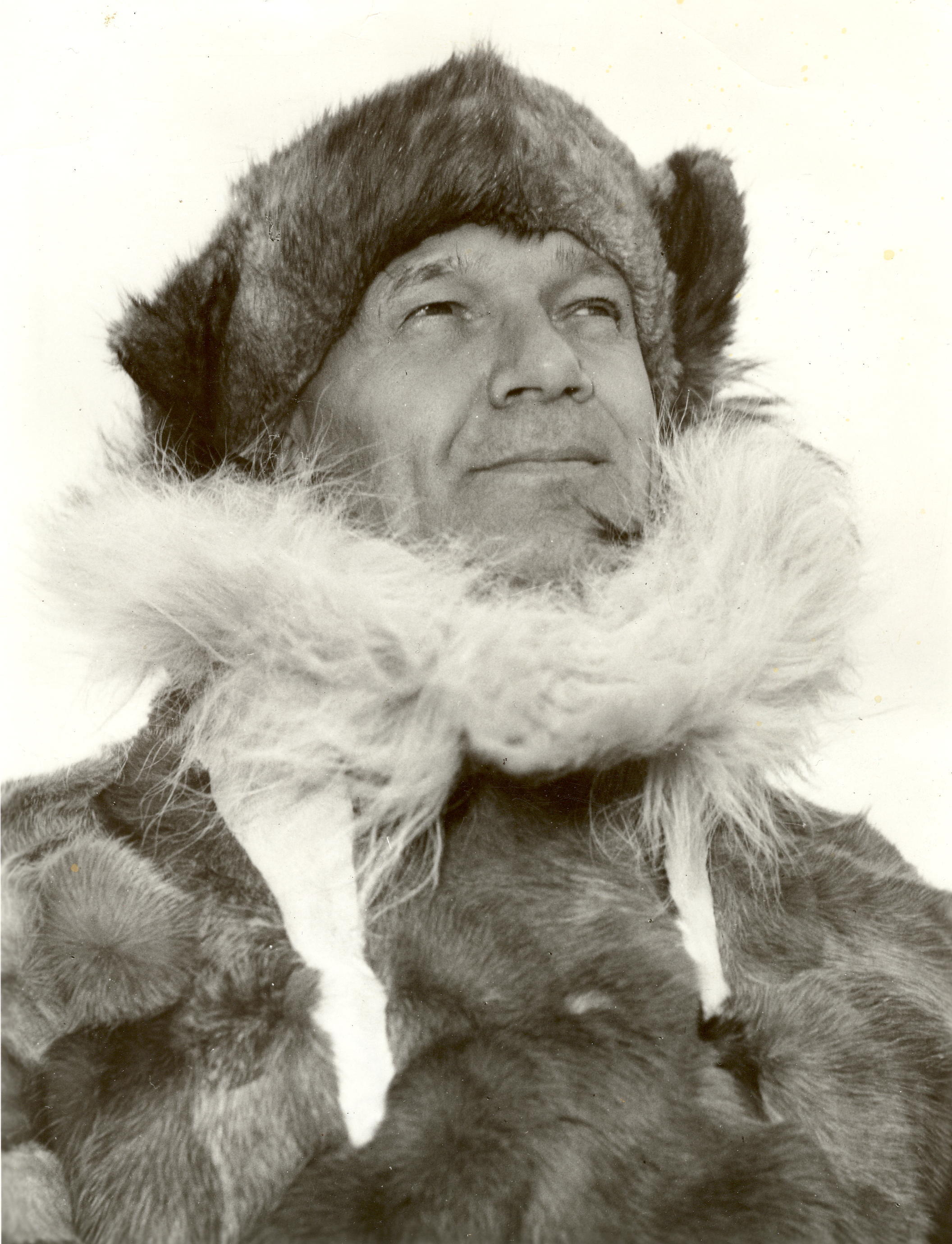
Finn Ronne, leader of the RARE expedition that discovered and photographed the mountains from the air.

The Behrendt Mountains were discovered and photographed from the air by the Ronne Antarctic Research Expedition (RARE), 1947–48, under Finn Ronne. They were named by United States Advisory Committee on Antarctic Names (US-ACAN) for John C. Behrendt, traverse seismologist at Ellsworth Station in 1957. Behrendt led the Antarctic Peninsula Traverse party to these mountains in the summer of 1961–62, and carried out investigations in Marie Byrd Land and the Pensacola Mountains in 1963-64 and 1965–66.

== Features ==
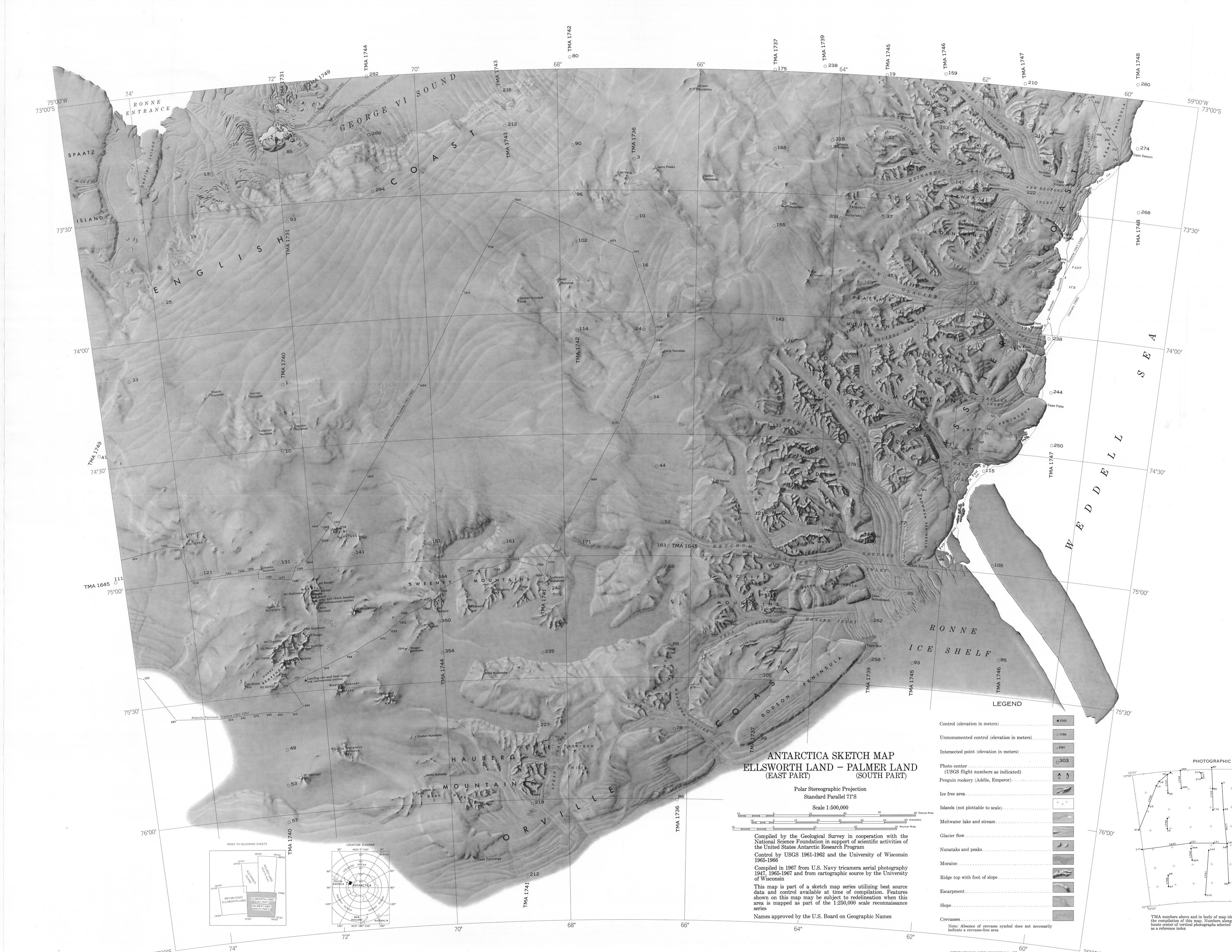
Eastern Ellsworth Land (south), Southern Palmer Land (north). Behrendt Mountains in southwest of map.

=== Mount Glowa ===
75°27′S 73°17′W. A prominent mountain 8 nautical miles (15 km; 9.2 mi) west of Mount Hirman in the Behrendt Mountains. Discovered and photographed from the air by the RARE, 1947–48, under Finn Ronne. Named by Ronne for Colonel L. William Glowa, aide to Gen. Curtis LeMay at the time RARE was organized, who assisted in obtaining support for the expedition.

=== Mount Hirman ===
75°28′S 72°46′W. A prominent mountain marking the south end of the Behrendt Mountains. Mapped by USGS from surveys and United States Navy air photos, 1961-67. Named by US-ACAN for Joseph W. Hirman, scientific leader at Eights Station in 1965.

=== Happy Valley ===
75°22′S 72°40′W. An ice-filled valley, 3 nautical miles (5.6 km; 3.5 mi) wide and over 10 nautical miles (19 km; 12 mi) long, lying within the horseshoe-shaped confines of the Behrendt Mountains, in Ellsworth Land. The name originated as a field name of the University of Wisconsin Traverse Party, 1965–66, which surveyed this area.

=== Mount Trimpi ===
75°21′S 72°48′W. A mountain 3 nautical miles (5.6 km; 3.5 mi) west-northwest of Mount Brice. Mapped by USGS from surveys and United States Navy air photos, 1961-67. Named by US-ACAN for Michael L. Trimpi, radioscience researcher at Eights Station in 1963.

=== Mount Neuner ===
75°18′S 72°41′W. A mountain 3.5 nautical miles (6.5 km; 4.0 mi) southwest of Mount Chandler. Mapped by USGS from surveys and United States Navy air photos, 1961-67. Named by US-ACAN for Charles S. Neuner, station engineer at Camp Sky-Hi, summer 1961-62.

=== Mount Chandler ===
75°17′S 72°33′W. A mountain 2.5 nautical miles (4.6 km; 2.9 mi) northwest of Mount Caywood. Mapped by USGS from surveys and United States Navy air photos, 1961-67. Named by US-ACAN for Lieutenant Commander J.L. Chandler, United States Navy, pilot of R4D aircraft in support of the Antarctic Peninsula Traverse party to this area, 1961-62.

=== Mount Brice ===
75°22′S 72°37′W. A mountain 2.5 nautical miles (4.6 km; 2.9 mi) west of Mount Abrams. Mapped by USGS from surveys and United States Navy air photos, 1961-67. Named by US-ACAN for Neil M. Brice, radioscience researcher in this area at Camp Sky-Hi, summer 1961-62.

=== Mount Abrams ===
75°22′S 72°27′W. A mountain 2.5 nautical miles (4.6 km; 2.9 mi) east of Mount Brice. Discovered and photographed from the air by the RARE, 1947–48, under Finn Ronne. Named by Ronne for Talbert Abrams, a noted photogrammetric engineer and instrument manufacturer, who was a supporter of RARE.

=== Luck Nunatak ===
75°19′S 72°32′W. A nunatak 2 nautical miles (3.7 km; 2.3 mi) southwest of Mount Caywood. Mapped by USGS from surveys and United States Navy air photos, 1961-67. Named by US-ACAN for George D. Luck, crew member of the R4D aircraft party which established a base camp in the Eights Station vicinity in 1961.

=== Mount Caywood ===
75°18′S 72°25′W. A conspicuous mountain rising midway between Mount Chandler and Mount Huffman, in the interior ice-filled valley of the Behrendt Mountains. Mapped by USGS from surveys and United States Navy air photos, 1961-67. Named by US-ACAN for Lindsay P. Caywood, Jr., geomagnetist at Camp Sky-Hi in this vicinity, summer 1961-62.

=== Mount Huffman ===
75°19′S 72°16′W. A prominent mountain 4 nautical miles (7.4 km; 4.6 mi) northeast of Mount Abrams. Mapped by USGS from surveys and United States Navy air photos, 1961-67. Named by US-ACAN for Jerry W. Huffman, scientific leader at Eights Station in 1963.

=== Thomson Summit ===
75°16′S 72°26′W. A mostly snow-covered mountain rising to 1,515 metres (4,970 ft) high between Mount Goodman and Mount Chandler. These mountains were visited during the 1984-85 season by a USARP geological party led by Peter D. Rowley of the United States Geological Survey. Upon his suggestion, named by US-ACAN, 1986, after Janet Wendy Thomson, BAS geologist; British Exchange Scientist with the Rowley party who climbed to the summit of this mountain; from 1992. She was Head, Mapping and Geographic Information Centre, BAS.

=== Mount Suggs ===
75°16′S 72°13′W. A mountain with a bare rock northern face, standing 2 nautical miles (3.7 km; 2.3 mi) south of Mount Goodman. Mapped by USGS from surveys and United States Navy air photos, 1961-67. Named by US-ACAN for Henry E. Suggs, equipment operator of United States Navy Mobile Construction Battalion One, who participated in the deployment to new Byrd Station, summer 1961-62.

=== Mount Goodman ===
75°14′S 72°14′W. A mountain marking the northeast extremity of the Behrendt Mountains. Mapped by USGS from surveys and United States Navy air photos, 1961-67. Named by US-ACAN after Alan L. Goodman, aurora scientist at Eights Station in 1963.

== Nearby features ==
=== Stanton Hills ===
75°17′S 73°12′W. A group of loosely clustered nunataks which extend over 12 nautical miles (22 km; 14 mi) and rise to about 1,300 metres (4,300 ft) high, centered 8 nautical miles (15 km; 9.2 mi) west of Mount Neuner. Mapped by USGS from surveys and United States Navy aerial photographs, 1961-67. Named by US-ACAN following a visit to the area by a USGS geological party, 1977–78, after Lieutenant Commander Ronald A. Stanton, United States Navy, command pilot of an LC-130 Hercules aircraft in support of the party.

=== Mount Hassage ===
75°51′S 72°29′W. A prominent isolated mountain 1,120 metres (3,670 ft) high located 12 nautical miles (22 km; 14 mi) southwest of Mount Home. The feature was discovered by the RARE under Ronne, and marks the southwest extremity and turnabout point of the RARE plane flight of November 21, 1947. Named by Ronne for Charles Hassage, ship's chief engineer on the expedition.

=== Quilty Nunataks ===
75°45′S 71°45′W. A group of nunataks which extend over 8 nautical miles (15 km; 9.2 mi), located 15 nautical miles (28 km; 17 mi) southwest of Thomas Mountains. Discovered by the RARE, 1947–48, led by Ronne. Named by US-ACAN for Patrick Quilty, geologist with the University of Wisconsin survey party to this area, 1965-66.

=== Mount Horne ===
75°46′S 71°44′W. Highest 1,165 metres (3,822 ft) high and most prominent mountain in the Quilty Nunataks, standing 12 nautical miles (22 km; 14 mi) east-northeast of Mount Hassage. Discovered by the RARE, 1947–48, under Ronne, who named it for Bernard Home of Pittsburgh, PA, who furnished wind-proofs and other clothing for the expedition.

=== Weather Guesser Nunataks ===
75°30′S 71°45′W. An isolated nunatak group 10 nautical miles (19 km; 12 mi) west-northwest of Thomas Mountains. First seen and photographed from the air by RARE, 1947-48. The name was suggested by Russell R. White, Jr., United States Navy aerographer and member of the University of Wisconsin survey party to the area, 1965-66.

=== Thomas Mountains ===
75°33′S 70°57′W. A separate cluster of rocky mountains, about 5 nautical miles (9.3 km; 5.8 mi) long, standing 15 nautical miles (28 km; 17 mi) northeast of Mount Home. Discovered by the RARE, 1947–48, under Ronne, who named these mountains for noted author and radio commentator Lowell Thomas, a supporter of the expedition.

=== Mount Boyles ===
75°34′S 70°56′W. The highest peak 1,485 metres (4,872 ft) high in the Thomas Mountains, located south of Sweeney Mountains. Discovered and roughly mapped by the RARE, 1947–48, led by Commander Finn Ronne, United States Navy Reserve. Mapped in greater detail by USGS from surveys and United States Navy aerial photographs, 1961-67. Named by US-ACAN following the visit of a USGS geological party, 1977–78, after Joseph M. Boyles, a geologist with the party.

== Sources ==
- Alberts, Fred G., ed. (1995), Geographic Names of the Antarctic (PDF) (2 ed.), United States Board on Geographic Names This article incorporates public domain material from websites or documents of the United States Board on Geographic Names.
- Ellsworth Land - Palmer Land, USGS: United States Geological Survey

This article incorporates public domain material from websites or documents of the United States Geological Survey.
