= Landen Ridge =

Landen Ridge (66°50′S 63°54′W) is a narrow rock ridge at the east end of Cole Peninsula in Graham Land, Antarctica. During December 1947 it was charted by the Falkland Islands Dependencies Survey and photographed from the air by the Ronne Antarctic Research Expedition (RARE) under Finn Ronne. It was named by Ronne for David Landen of the United States Geological Survey, who assisted in planning the RARE photographic program and in correlating photographs after the expedition returned.
