= Thuronyi Bluff =

Escarpment in Antarctica

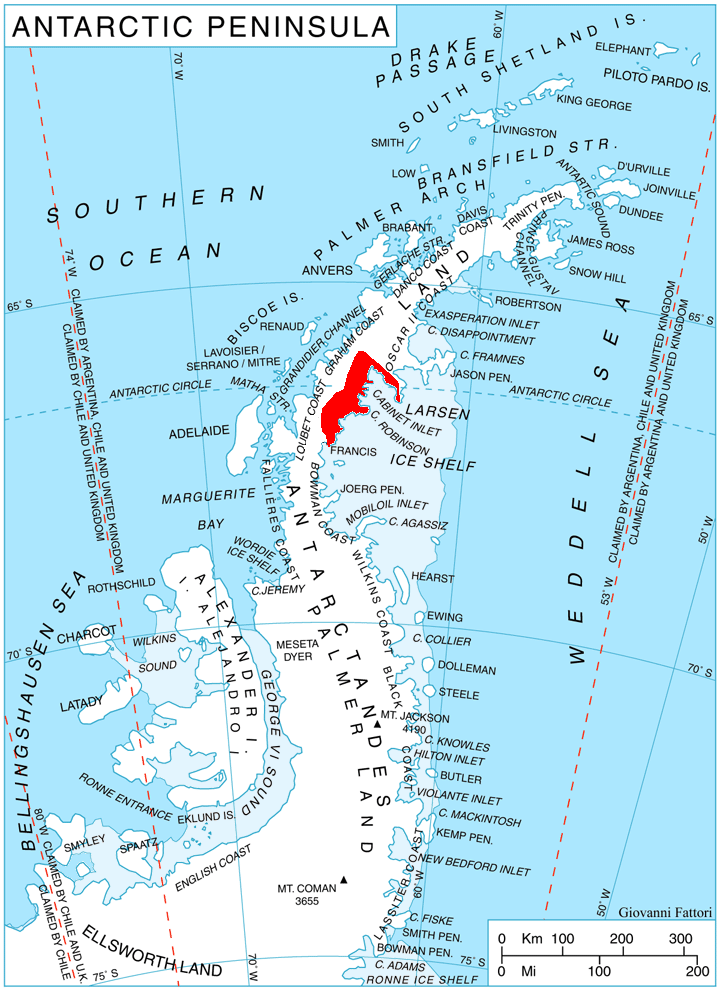
Location of Foyn Coast on Antarctic Peninsula.

Thuronyi Bluff (66°48′S 64°45′W) is a prominent escarpment on the east coast of the Antarctic Peninsula, which faces the Larsen Ice Shelf and the Weddell Sea and lies immediately south of the Antarctic Circle. It is located above Mill Inlet in British Antarctic Territory at the base of the Cole Peninsula, between Balch Glacier and Gould Glacier; it is part of Graham Land. The bluff was first observed in aerial photographs taken on December 22, 1947, during the Ronne Antarctic Research Expedition.

Just north of Thuronyi Bluff, the Larsen Ice Shelf once extended a hundred kilometers (or more) from land before any open sea would be encountered. However, part of the shelf larger than the state of Rhode Island, known as "Larsen B", disintegrated over a three-week period in 2002, which followed a similar disintegration of the equivalently sized "Larsen A" region in 1995. It is anticipated that "Larsen C", which lies at the foot of Thuronyi Bluff, may suffer a similar fate sometime in the next decade, after which open seawater will likely come near to Thuronyi Bluff during the austral summertime.

== Namesake ==
This escarpment is named for Géza T. Thuronyi (1919-2007), an Antarctic scholar at the Library of Congress, whose annotated bibliographies of the meteorological and geoastrophysical characteristics of Earth's cold regions did much to make often obscure publications more available to both the scientific community and the public. The name was applied by the Advisory Committee on Antarctic Names upon Mr. Thuronyi's retirement in 1990, in recognition of his contributions in unveiling the nature of the Antarctic continent.
