= Howard Thomas Orville =

American naval officer and meteorologist

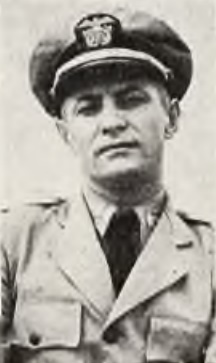
- Born: June 16, 1901; Saratoga, Wyoming
- Died: May 24, 1960 (aged 58)
- Resting place: Arlington National Cemetery
- Occupations: Naval officer and meteorologist
- Spouse: Lillian Duvall
- Children: Harry Orville; H. Thomas Orville, Jr. Richard Orville

Howard Thomas Orville (June 16, 1901 – May 24, 1960) was an American naval officer and meteorologist.

== Naval career ==
He was born in Saratoga, Wyoming, the son of William Orville and Lucy Dale (Wiant). After attending the Army and Navy Preparatory School during 1918–19, he matriculated to the United States Naval Academy, graduating in 1925. Thereafter he studied at the Naval Postgraduate School 1928–29 and spent a year of study at Massachusetts Institute of Technology, where he was awarded a master's degree in 1930.

In 1935, Lt. Orville served as the meteorologist for the U.S. Navy's sole entry in the James Gordon Bennett International Balloon Race held in Warsaw, Poland. The pilot was Lt. Raymond E. Tyler, an experienced airship man with a service record dating back to World War I. Despite making a good team, the two men came in last place. In 1940 he was named head of the Naval Aerological Service, a post he would hold until 1943 when he became Deputy Chief of Naval Operations (Air). During World War II he was notable for charting the weather for the 1942 Doolittle Raid. He served as weather adviser for naval operations in the Pacific Ocean and for Operation Torch, the invasion of North Africa.

In 1946, he served on the Special Subcommittee on the Upper Atmosphere. The following year, Captain Orville designed the meteorological program used during the Ronne Antarctic Research Expedition, which was headed up by Finn Ronne. From 1945 to 1947 (and later from 1950 to 1954) he served as a councilor to the American Meteorological Society and was elected president of the society for the 1948–49 term. In 1950 he retired from the Navy and was named director of engineering for the Friez Instrument Division of Bendix Aviation Corporation.

== Post-retirement ==
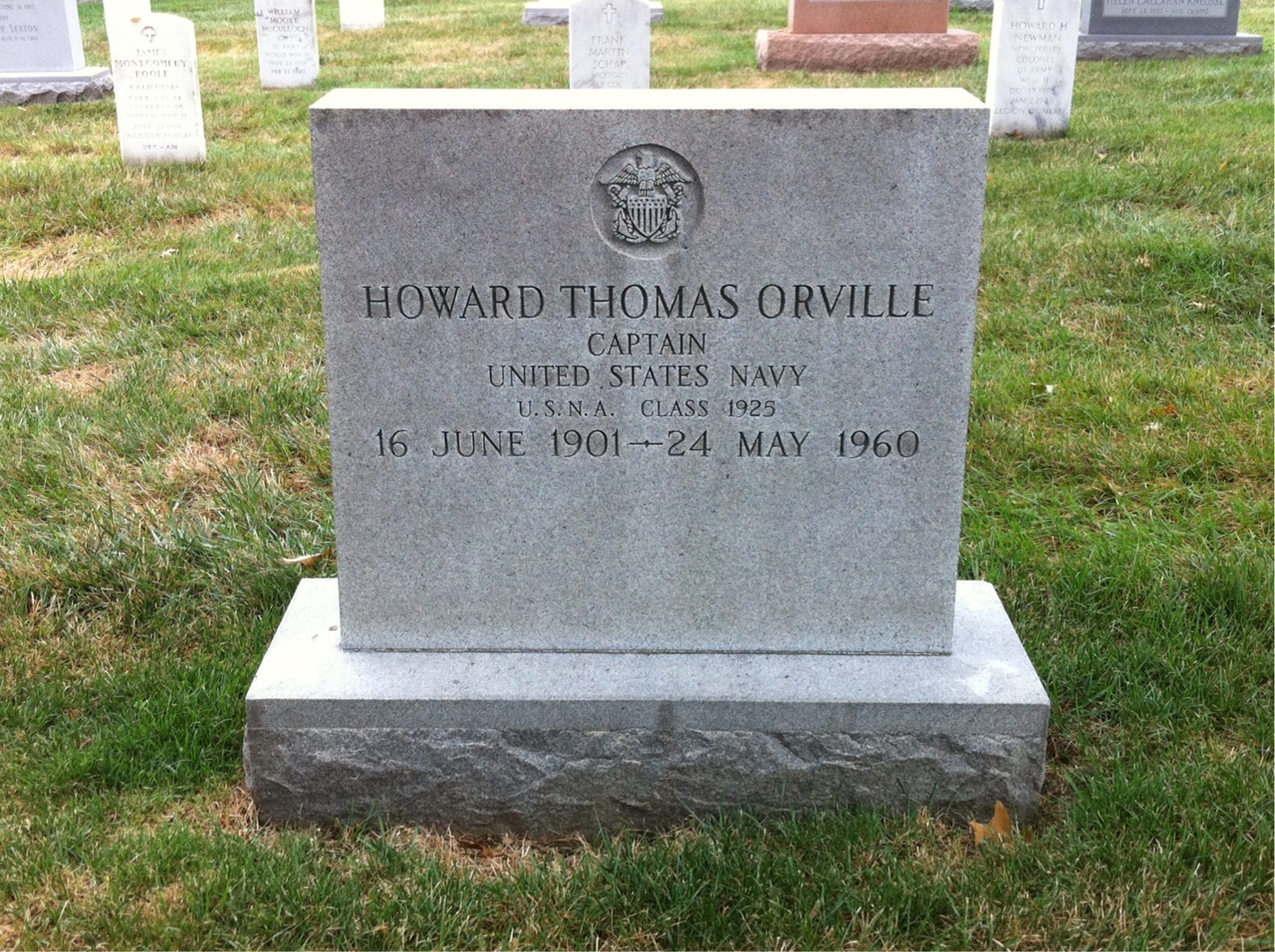
Grave at Arlington National Cemetery

Project Cirrus was an attempt by the United States government in 1947 to modify a hurricane by seeding the clouds with silver iodide. Orville served as a member of the project's steering committee. However, by 1950 the American Meteorological Society concluded that seeding attempts had not conclusively demonstrated any useful results. Congress wanted to pursue the concept of weather control and in 1953 they created the U.S. Advisory Committee on Weather Control. President Dwight Eisenhower signed the law and named Orville to chair the committee. The committee studied the idea of cloud seeding and cautiously concluded that, under certain circumstances, cloud seeding could "increase precipitation by 10 to 15 percent".

On May 11, 1953, a Texas A&M University student observed some unusual cloud activity on a 10 cm radar system and recorded it with a picture. A few minutes later a tornado was spawned from the clouds over Waco, Texas, killing 110 people. Meteorologists from Texas A&M concluded that the radar echo could serve as advance warning of a pending tornado event. The president of the university contacted Orville and together they proposed a Texas radar network to track tornadoes, to be modeled after the Florida hurricane network.

By 1958, Orville became an advocate for researching the use of weather control as a weapon, fearing that the Soviet Union may develop the technology before the U.S. The final report of Orville's Advisory Committee on Weather Control, issued in January 1958 just a few months following the launch of Sputnik, stated that they believed the Soviets had already such a program in place.

Orville died suddenly on May 24, 1960, and was buried at Arlington National Cemetery. During his career, Orville became notable for being the first person to advocate a national array of radar stations to monitor severe weather patterns. Orville Coast in Antarctica was named after him, as was the Howard T. Orville Scholarship in Meteorology, established in 1964 by the American Meteorological Society.
