= Merrick Mountains =

Antarctic mountain cluster

- Location within Antarctica

Highest point
- Elevation: 1,256 m (4,121 ft)

Geography
- Continent: Antarctica

The Merrick Mountains (75°06′S 72°04′W) are a cluster of mountains, 8 nautical miles (15 km; 9.2 mi) long, standing 7 nautical miles (13 km; 8.1 mi) northeast of the Behrendt Mountains in Ellsworth Land, Antarctica.

== Location ==
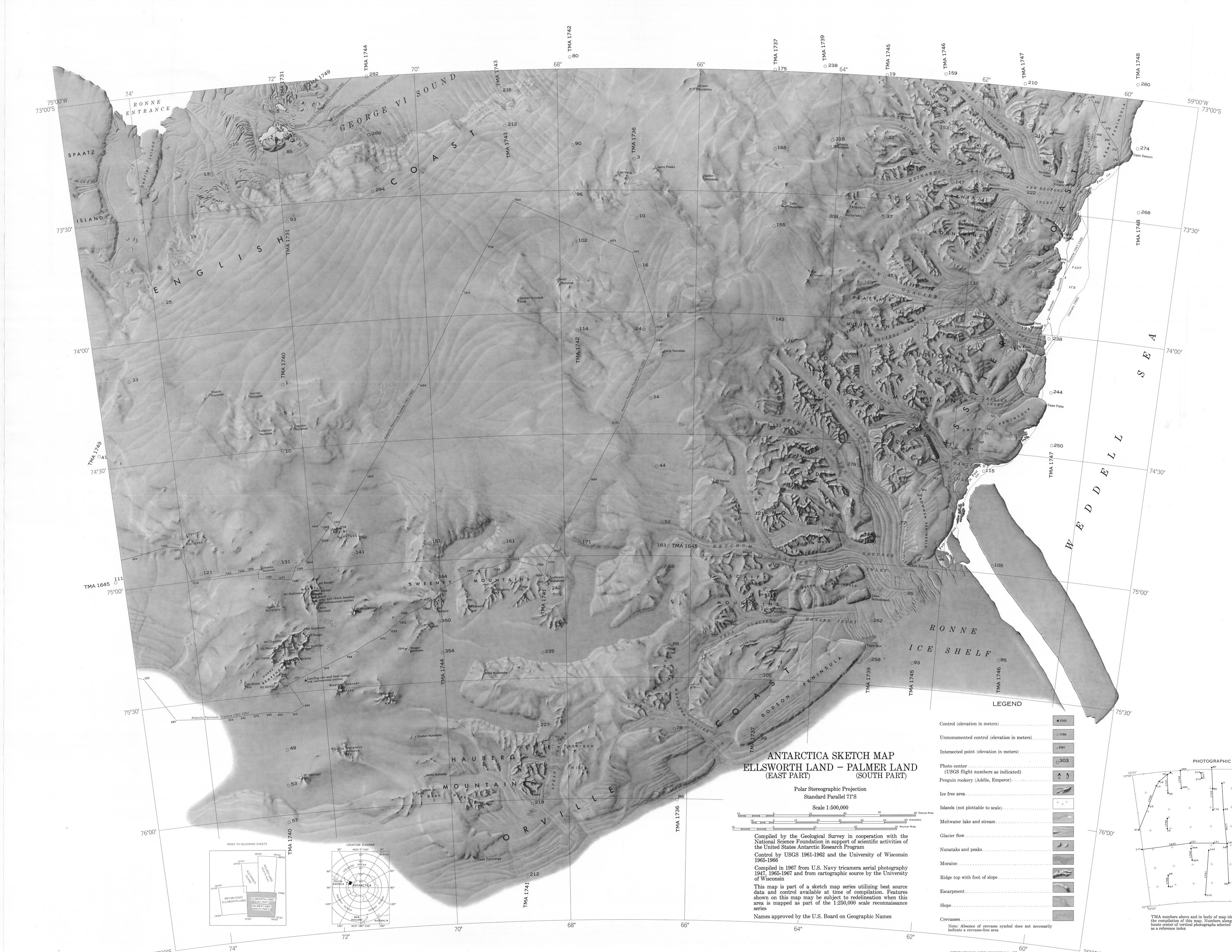
Eastern Ellsworth Land (south), Southern Palmer Land (north). Behrendt Mountains in southwest of map.

The Merrick Mountains are in eastern Ellsworth Land, to the south of the English Coast of George VI Sound They are northeast of the Behrendt Mountains and west of the Sweeney Mountains. Features include, from south to north, Eaton Nunatak, Mount Boyer, Mount Matheson, Mount Becker and Mount Berger. Nearby features include Henry Nunataks, Cheeks Nunatak, Lyon Nunataks, Sky-Hi Nunataks and Mount Wasilewski.

== Discovery and name ==
The Merrick Mountains were discovered and photographed from the air by the Ronne Antarctic Research Expedition (RARE), 1947–48, under Finn Ronne. They were named by the United States Advisory Committee on Antarctic Names (US-ACAN) for Conrad G. Merrick, United States Geological Survey (USGS) topographic engineer with the Antarctic Peninsula Traverse Party, 1961–62, who participated in the survey of these mountains.

== Features ==
=== Eaton Nunatak ===
75°10′S 72°00′W. A prominent nunatak marking the southeast extremity of the Merrick Mountains. Mapped by USGS from surveys and United States Navy air photos, 1961-67. Named by US-ACAN for John W. Eaton, aurora scientist at Eights Station in 1963.

=== Mount Boyer ===
75°07′S 72°04′W. A mountain 1 nautical mile (1.9 km; 1.2 mi) southwest of Mount Becker. Mapped by USGS from surveys and United States Navy air photos, 1961-67. Named by US-ACAN for Francis C. Boyer, hospital corpsman, United States Navy, chief petty officer in charge of Eights Station in 1964.

=== Mount Matheson ===
75°05′S 72°10′W. A mountain 2 nautical miles (3.7 km; 2.3 mi) northwest of Mount Boyer. Mapped by USGS from surveys and United States Navy air photos, 1961-67. Named by US-AC AN for Lome D. Matheson, ionospheric physics researcher at Eights Station in 1963.

=== Mount Becker ===
75°06′S 72°02′W. A prominent mountain 1 nautical mile (1.9 km; 1.2 mi) northeast of Mount Boyer. These mountains were discovered from the air and photographed by the RARE, 1947-48, under Finn Ronne. The mountain was named by Ronne for Ralph A. Becker, legal counsel who assisted in the formation of RARE and in obtaining financial support for the expedition.

=== Mount Berger ===
75°04′S 71°57′W. A mountain with a steep northern rock face, standing 2 nautical miles (3.7 km; 2.3 mi) northeast of Mount Becker. Mapped by USGS from surveys and United States Navy air photos, 1961-67. Named by US-ACAN for Lieutenant Commander Raymond E. Berger, United States Navy, aircraft pilot who flew the University of Wisconsin Traverse Party to this area and flew support missions in its behalf in the 1965-66 season.

== Nearby features ==
=== Henry Nunataks ===
75°08′S 72°36′W. A cluster of nunataks located 6 nautical miles (11 km; 6.9 mi) west of the Merrick Mountains. Mapped by USGS from surveys and United States Navy air photos, 1961-67. Named by US-ACAN for K.C. Henry, engineman with the Eights Station winter party in 1963.

=== Mount Wasilewski ===
75°11′S 71°24′W. Prominent isolated mountain 1,615 metres (5,299 ft) high located 9 nautical miles (17 km; 10 mi) east-southeast of Merrick Mountains. First seen and photographed from the air by RARE, 1947–48. Named by US-ACAN for Peter J. Wasilewski, member of the University of Wisconsin parties which explored this area in the 1961-62 and 1965-66 seasons.

== Sources ==
- Alberts, Fred G., ed. (1995), Geographic Names of the Antarctic (PDF) (2 ed.), United States Board on Geographic Names This article incorporates public domain material from websites or documents of the United States Board on Geographic Names.
- Ellsworth Land - Palmer Land, USGS: United States Geological Survey

This article incorporates public domain material from websites or documents of the United States Geological Survey.
