= Sweeney Mountains =

Group of mountains in Palmer Land, Antarctica

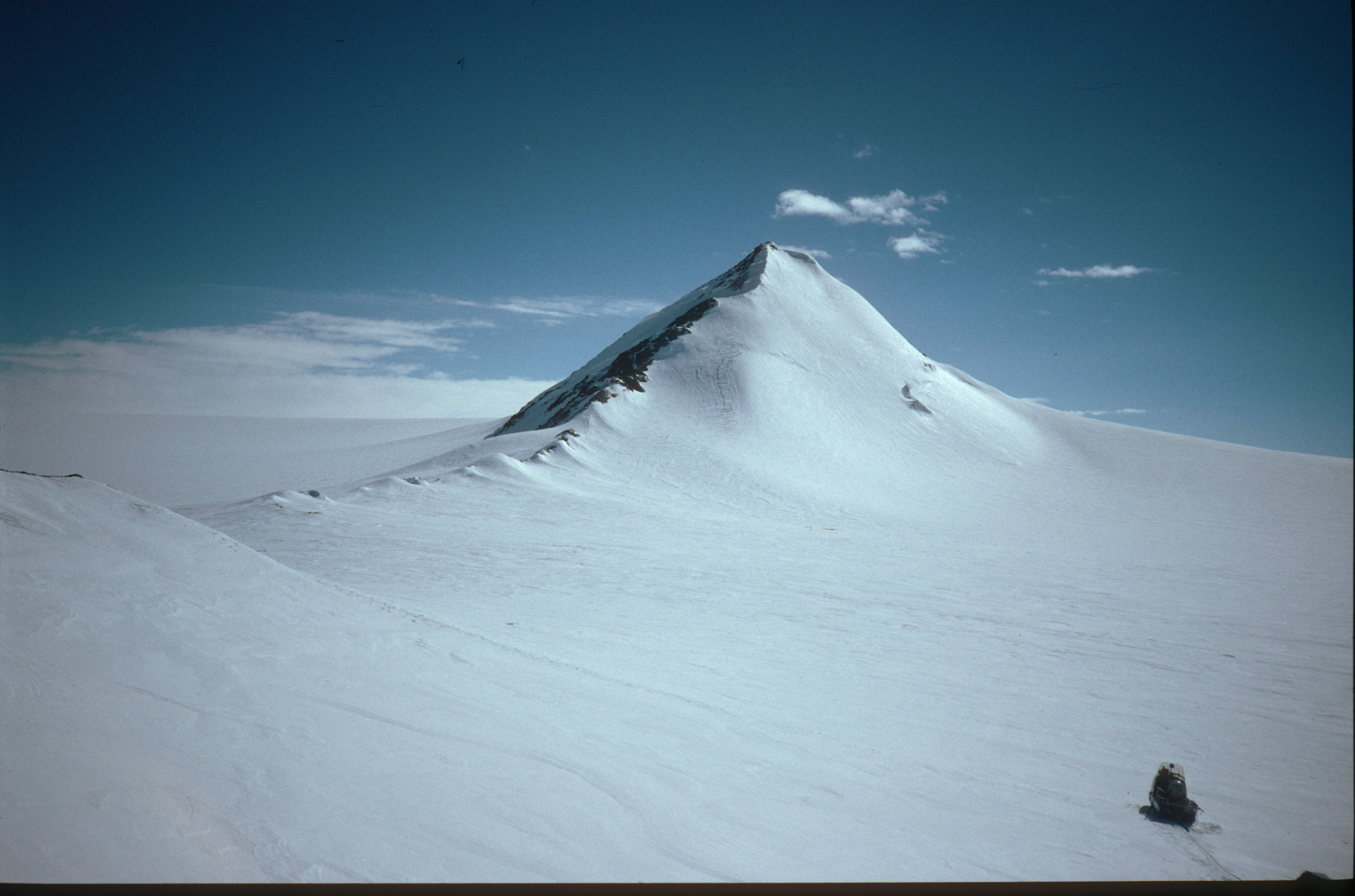
- Hagerty Peak in the Sweeney Mountains

Geography
- Location within Antarctica
- Continent: Antarctica
- Region: Ellsworth Land
- Range coordinates: 75°06′S 069°15′W

The Sweeney Mountains (75°06′S 069°15′W) are a group of mountains of moderate height and about 40 nautical miles (74 km; 46 mi) extent, located 30 nautical miles (56 km; 35 mi) north of the Hauberg Mountains in eastern Ellsworth Land, Antarctica.

== Location ==
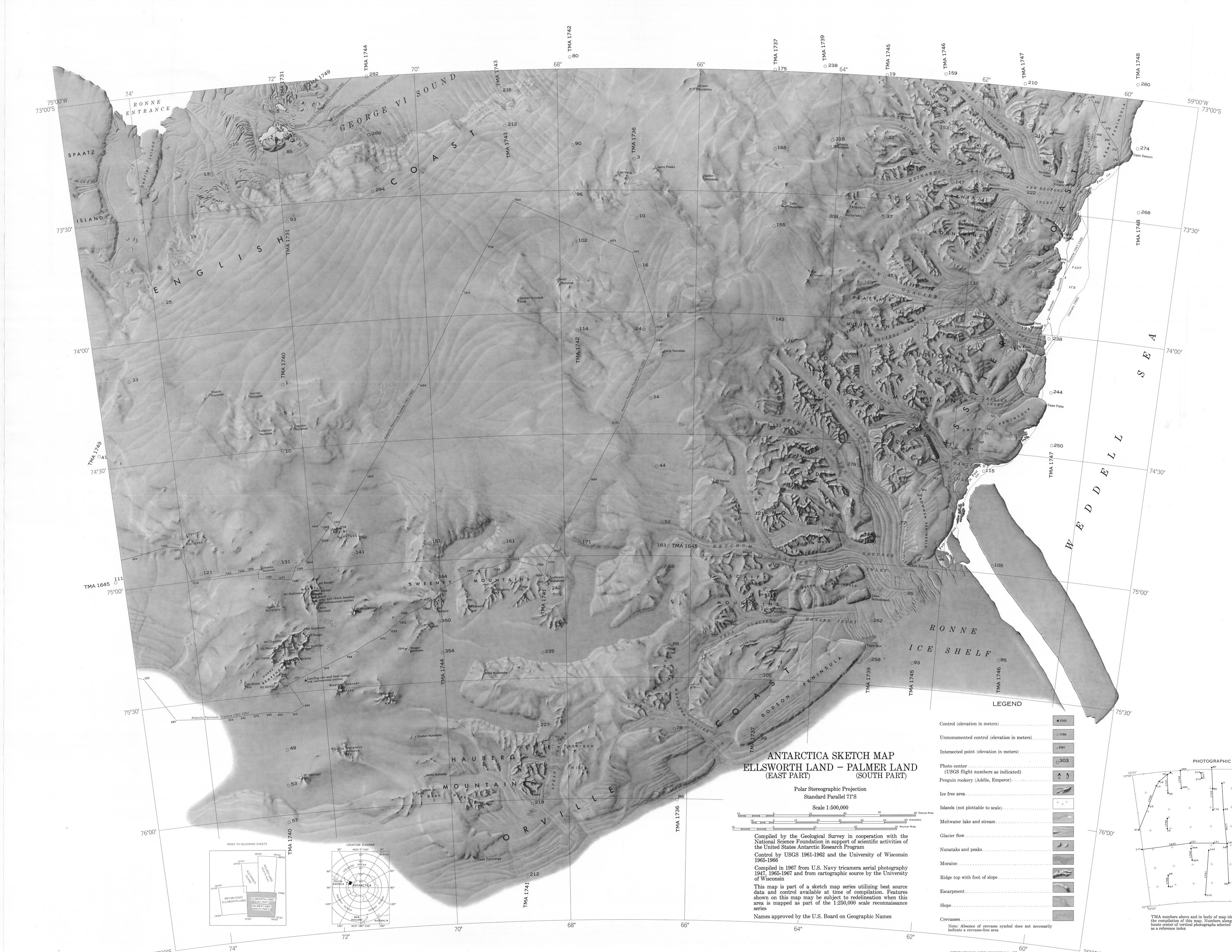
Eastern Ellsworth Land (south), Southern Palmer Land (north). Hauberg Mountains in southwest of map.

The Sweeney Mountains are in the southeast of Ellsworth Land. They are east of the Merrick Mountains, northeast of the Behrendt Mountains, north of the Hauberg Mountains, northwest of the Wilkins Mountains and west of the Scaife Mountains. The region to the north, extending to the English Coast, is largely featureless. Features and nearby features, from west to east, include Morgan Nunataks, Mount Smart, Mount Ballard, Mount Edward, Mount Jenkins, Potter Peak, Anderson Nunataks and Hagerty Peak.

== Discovery and name ==
The Sweeney Mountains were discovered by the Ronne Antarctic Research Expedition (RARE), 1947–48, under Finn Ronne, who named these mountains after Mrs. Edward C. Sweeney, a contributor to the expedition.

== Features ==
=== Morgan Nunataks ===
75°22′S 70°35′W. A small group of nunataks located at the southwest extremity of the Sweeney Mountains. First observed from the air by the RARE, 1947–48. Mapped by the United States Geological Survey (USGS) from surveys and United States Navy air photos, 1961-67. Named by the United States Advisory Committee on Antarctic Names (US-ACAN) for William R. Morgan, cook at Eights Station in 1965.

=== Mount Smart ===
75°16′S 70°14′W. A mountain 4 nautical miles (7.4 km; 4.6 mi) southwest of Mount Ballard, in the southwest part of the Sweeney Mountains. Mapped by USGS from surveys and United States Navy air photos, 1961-67. Named by US-ACAN for Robert G. Smart, cook at Eights Station in 1965.

=== Mount Ballard ===
75°12′S 70°05′W. Mountain in the west part of the Sweeney Mountains. Mapped by USGS from ground surveys and United States Navy air photos, 1961-67. Named by US-ACAN for G.E. Ballard, equipment operator with the South Pole Station winter party in 1963.

=== Mount Edward ===
75°12′S 69°33′W. A prominent rock mountain 1,635 metres (5,364 ft) high located centrally along the south margin of the Sweeney Mountains. Discovered by the RARE, 1947 48, under Ronne, who named this summit for Commander Edward C. Sweeney, United States Navy Reserve, a contributor to the expedition.

=== Mount Jenkins ===
75°08′S 69°10′W. A mountain, 1,705 metres (5,594 ft) high, standing 7 nautical miles (13 km; 8.1 mi) northeast of Mount Edward in the Sweeney Mountains. Discovered and photographed by the RARE, 1947–48. Mapped by USGS from surveys and United States Navy air photos, 1961-67. Named by US-ACAN for W.H. Jenkins, hospital corpsman at South Pole Station, winter party 1963.

=== Potter Peak ===
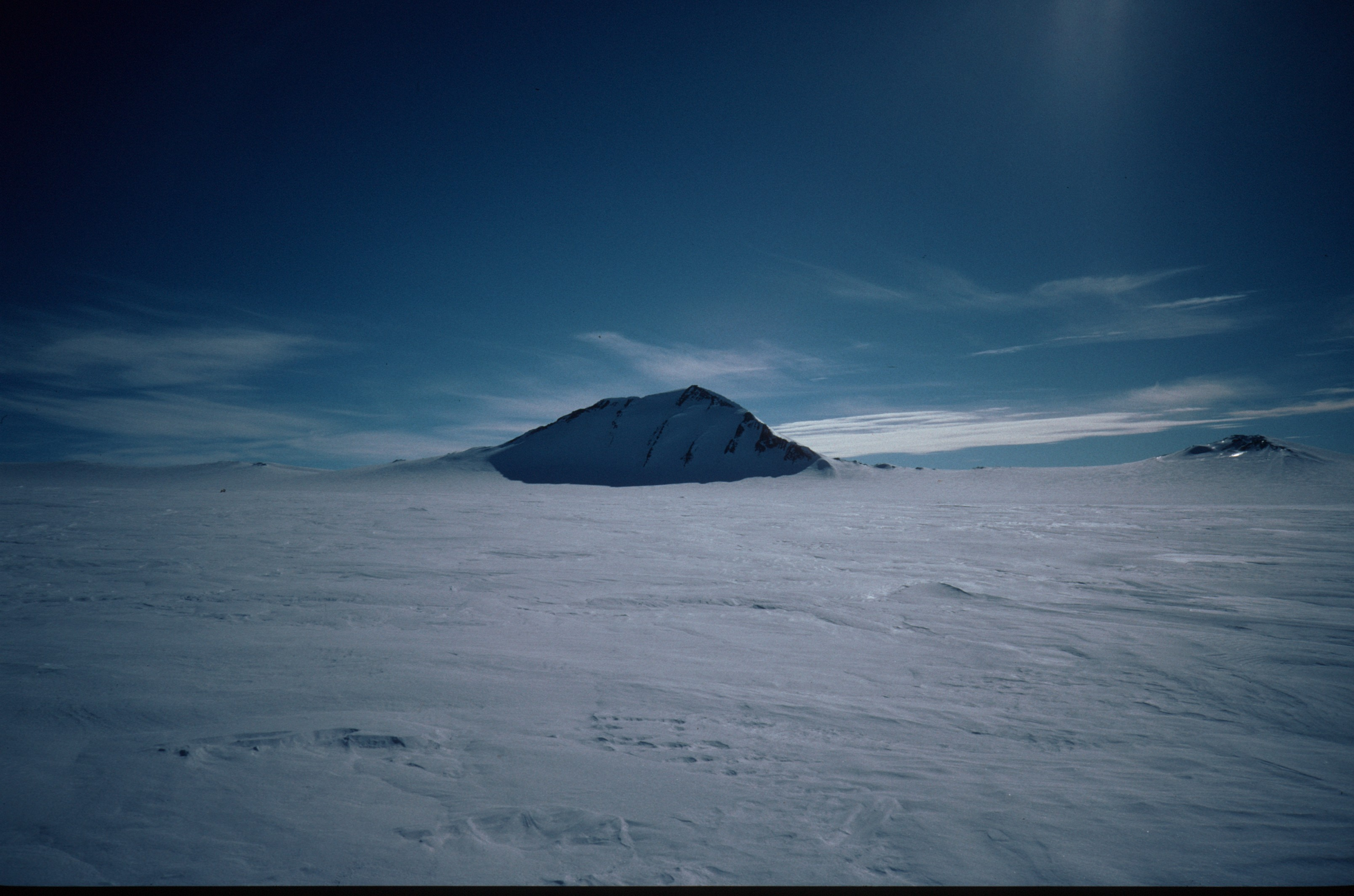
Potter Peak from east

75°07′S 68°45′W. Peak standing 6 nautical miles (11 km; 6.9 mi) east of Mount Jenkins in the Sweeney Mountains, Ellsworth Land. First observed from aircraft by the RARE, 1947-48. Mapped by USGS from surveys and United States Navy air photos, 1961-67. Named by US-ACAN for Christopher J. Potter, glaciologist at Byrd Station, summer 1965-66.

=== Anderson Nunataks ===
75°06′S 68°18′W. A group of nunataks forming the northeast end of Sweeney Mountains. Discovered and photographed from the air by the RARE, 1947-48. Mapped by USGS from surveys and United States Navy air photos, 1961-67. Named by US-ACAN for Richard E. Anderson, aviation electronics technician on R4D flights in 1961, including a November 4, 1961 reconnaissance flight from Byrd Station to the Eights Coast.

=== Hagerty Peak ===
75°17′S 68°11′W. Peak in the southeast extremity of the Sweeney Mountains. Mapped by USGS from ground surveys and United States Navy air photos, 1961-67. Named by US-ACAN for Cornelius J. Hagerty, photographer with the McMurdo Station winter party in 1960.

== Sources ==
- Alberts, Fred G., ed. (1995), Geographic Names of the Antarctic (PDF) (2 ed.), United States Board on Geographic Names This article incorporates public domain material from websites or documents of the United States Board on Geographic Names.
- Ellsworth Land - Palmer Land, USGS: United States Geological Survey

This article incorporates public domain material from websites or documents of the United States Geological Survey.
