= Scaife Mountains =

Group of mountains in Palmer Land, Antarctica

- Location within Antarctica

Geography
- Continent: Antarctica
- Range coordinates: 75°06′S 065°08′W

The Scaife Mountains (75°06′S 065°08′W) is a group of mountains rising west of Prehn Peninsula and between the Ketchum Glacier and Ueda Glacier, at the base of the Antarctic Peninsula.

== Location ==
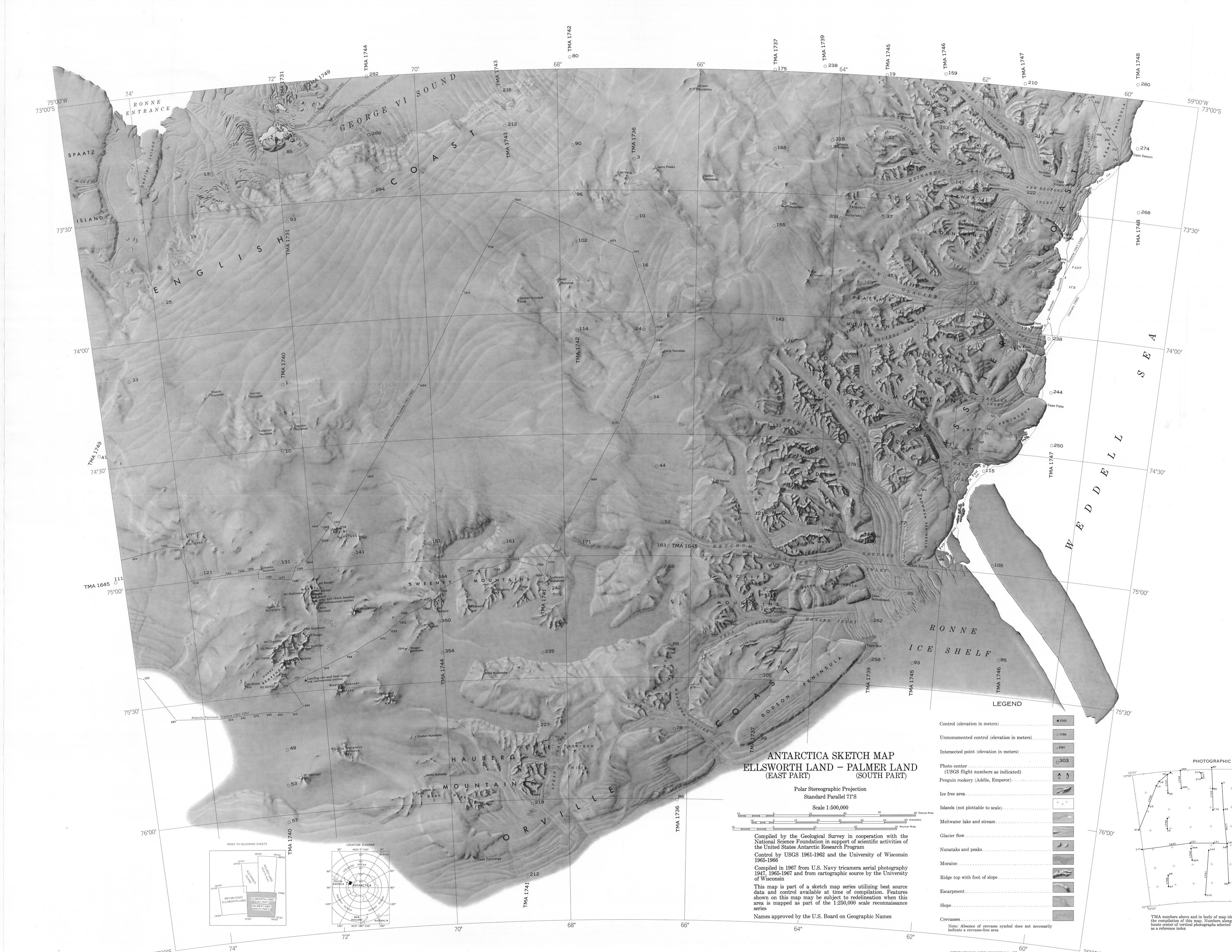
Eastern Ellsworth Land (south), Southern Palmer Land (north). Hauberg Mountains in southwest of map.

The Scaife Mountains are in Ellsworth Land. They are southwest of the Latady Mountains and east of the Sweeney Mountains. They are bounded by the Ketchum Glacier to the north, which flows into Gardner Inlet, and the Ueda Glacier to the south, which flows into Hansen Inlet. The inlets are both ice-bound and join the Ronne Ice Shelf on the shore of the Weddell Sea. Features include Mount Macnowski in the north and Mount Mount Brundage and Mount Terwileger in the south. Nearby features to the east include Prehn Peninsula, Lamboley Peak and Cape Schlossbach. Nearby features to the southeast include McCaw Ridge, Mount McKibben, Dodson Peninsula and Cape Cox.

== Discovery and name ==
The Scaife Mountains were discovered by the Ronne Antarctic Research Expedition (RARE) under Finn Ronne, 1947–48, who named these mountains for Alan M. Scaife of Pittsburgh, Pennsylvania, a contributor to the expedition.

== Features ==
=== Mount Macnowski ===
74°59′S 64°57′W. A mountain in the north part of the Scaife Mountains, about 5 nautical miles (9.3 km; 5.8 mi) west-southwest of Schmitt Mesa, near the base of Antarctic Peninsula. First observed from the air by the RARE, 1947–48. Mapped by USGS from surveys and United States Navy air photos, 1961-67. Named by US-ACAN for Francis B. Macnowski, construction mechanic at South Pole Station in 1967.

=== Mount Brundage ===
75°16′S 65°28′W. Mountain located 12 nautical miles (22 km; 14 mi) west-southwest of Mount Terwileger in the south part of the Scaife Mountains. Discovered by the RARE under Ronne, 1947-48, who named it for Burr Brundage, United States Dept. of State, who assisted in making arrangements for the expedition.

=== Mount Terwileger ===
75°13′S 64°44′W. A mountain on the north side of Ueda Glacier, standing at the southeast extremity of the Scaife Mountains, near the base of Antarctic Peninsula. Mapped by USGS from surveys and United States Navy air photos, 1961-67. Named by US-ACAN for Stephen E. Terwileger, hospital corpsman at South Pole Station in 1967.

== Nearby features ==
=== Prehn Peninsula ===
75°06′S 63°30′W. A mainly ice-covered peninsula, 20 nautical miles (37 km; 23 mi) long and 10 nautical miles (19 km; 12 mi) wide, between Hansen and Gardner Inlets, on the east coast and at the base of Antarctic Peninsula. First observed from aircraft by the RARE, 1947-48. Mapped by USGS from surveys and United States Navy air photos, 1961-67. Named by US-ACAN for Lieutenant Commander Frederick A. Prehn, Jr., United States Navy, pilot on photographic flights in the Pensacola Mountains and Alexander Island areas on Operation Deep Freeze 1967 and 1968.

=== Lamboley Peak ===
75°04′S 64°19′W. A prominent peak in the northwest part of Prehn Peninsula, Orville Coast. The peak was first photographed by the RARE, 1947-48, and was mapped by the USGS from surveys and United States Navy air photos, 1961-67. Named by US-ACAN after Paul E. Lamboley, radioman at South Pole Station in 1964.

=== Ueda Glacier ===
75°15′S 64°35′W. A large glacier flowing eastward along the south side of the Scaife Mountains to enter Hansen Inlet near the base of Antarctic Peninsula. Mapped by the United States Geological Survey (USGS) from surveys and United States Navy air photographs, 1961-67. Named by the United States Advisory Committee on Antarctic Names (US-ACAN) for Herbert T. Ueda who, with B. Lyle Hansen, was in charge of the deep core drilling program at Byrd Station, summers 1966-67 and 1967-68.

=== Hansen Inlet ===
75°15′S 63°40′W. Ice-filled inlet between Cape Schlossbach and Cape Cox, along the east coast and near the base of Antarctic Peninsula. Mapped by USGS from ground surveys and United States Navy air photos, 1961-67. Named by US-ACAN for B. Lyle Hansen who, with Herbert T. Ueda, was in charge of the deep-core drilling program at Byrd Station for several seasons, 1966-69.

=== McCaw Ridge ===
75°21′S 65°00′W. An isolated ridge lying 4 nautical miles (7.4 km; 4.6 mi) south of the central part of Ueda Glacier, near the base of Antarctic Peninsula. Mapped by USGS from surveys and United States Navy air photos, 1961-67. Named by US-ACAN for D. McCaw, construction electrician at South Pole Station in 1963.

=== Mount McKibben ===
75°23′S 64°42′W. A mountain standing 5 nautical miles (9.3 km; 5.8 mi) southwest of Hansen Inlet and 3 nautical miles (5.6 km; 3.5 mi) southeast of McCaw Ridge, near the base of Antarctic Peninsula. Mapped by USGS from surveys and United States Navy air photos, 1961-67. Named by US-ACAN for L.D. McKibben, United States Navy, shipfitter with the South Pole Station winter party in 1963.

=== Dodson Peninsula ===
75°32′S 64°12′W. An ice-covered peninsula, 40 nautical miles (74 km; 46 mi) long, located south of Hansen Inlet on the Orville Coast of Ellsworth Land. Discovered by the RARE, 1947-48, under Ronne, and named by him after Captain Harry L. Dodson, United States Navy, a director of the American Antarctic Society (the organizing body of RARE), and for his son, Robert H.T. Dodson, assistant geologist, surveyor, and chief dog team driver with RARE.

=== Cape Cox ===
75°20′S 63°08′W. Cape which forms the northeast extremity of Dodson Peninsula at the west side of Ronne Ice Shelf. First sighted from the air by the RARE, 1947-48. Mapped by USGS from ground surveys and United States Navy air photos, 1961-67. Named by US-ACAN for Larry E. Cox, radioman with the South Pole Station winter party in 1964.

== Sources ==
- Alberts, Fred G., ed. (1995), Geographic Names of the Antarctic (PDF) (2 ed.), United States Board on Geographic Names This article incorporates public domain material from websites or documents of the United States Board on Geographic Names.
- Ellsworth Land - Palmer Land, USGS: United States Geological Survey

This article incorporates public domain material from websites or documents of the United States Geological Survey.
