= Orville Coast =

Coordinates: 75°45′S 65°30′W

Location of Orville Coast

Orville Coast is that portion of the coast of Antarctica lying west of Ronne Ice Shelf between Cape Adams and Cape Zumberge. It was discovered by the Ronne Antarctic Research Expedition (RARE), 1947–48, under Ronne, who named this coast for Captain Howard T. Orville, USN, Head of the Naval Aerological Service, who was largely responsible for formulating the RARE meteorological program. The name "Orville Coast" is considered a more useful reference than "Orville Escarpment," the name originally applied for this area.

== See also ==
- Jaeger Hills
