= Ronne Antarctic Research Expedition =

Antarctica expedition in 1947–1948, led by Finn Ronne

The Ronne Antarctic Research Expedition (RARE) was an expedition from 1947–1948 which researched the area surrounding the head of the Weddell Sea in Antarctica.

== Background ==
Finn Ronne led the RARE which was the final privately sponsored expedition from the United States and explored and mapped the last unknown coastline on earth and determined that the Weddell Sea and the Ross Sea were not connected. The expedition included Isaac Schlossbach, as second in command, who was to have Cape Schlossbach named after him. The expedition, based out of Stonington Island was the first to take women to over-winter. Ronne's wife, Edith Ronne was correspondent for the North American Newspaper Alliance for expedition and the chief pilot Darlington took his wife.

== Partial listing of discoveries ==
- Mount Abrams – Named for Talbert Abrams, noted photogrammetric engineer
- Mount Becker – Named for Ralph A. Becker, legal counsel who assisted in the formation of RARE
- Mount Brundage – Named for Burr Brundage, U.S. Department of State, who assisted in making arrangements for the expedition
- English Coast- Named for Capt. Robert A.J. English, USN, Executive Secretary of the USAS
- Sweeney Mountains – Named for Mrs. Edward C. Sweeney, a contributor to the expedition
- Behrendt Mountains – Named for John C. Behrendt, traverse seismologist at Ellsworth Station
- Merrick Mountains – Named for Conrad G. Merrick, USGS topographic engineer
- Gardner Inlet – Named for Irvine Gardner, physicist at the National Bureau of Standards
- Thuronyi Bluff – Named for Géza Thuronyi, an Antarctic scholar at the Library of Congress
- Wetmore Glacier – Named for Alexander Wetmore, Secretary of the Smithsonian Institution
- Irvine Glacier – Named for George J. Irvine, of the Engineer Depot at Fort Belvoir, Virginia
- Quilty Nunataks – Named for Patrick Quilty, geologist with the University of Wisconsin–Madison
- Mount Coman – Named for Dr. F. Dana Coman, physician with the Byrd Antarctic Expedition
- Haag Nunataks – Named for Joseph Haag, head of Todd Pacific Shipyards
- Ewing Island – Named for Dr. Maurice Ewing, Columbia University, assisted in planning RARE
- Cape Adams – Named for Lt. Charles J. Adams of the then USAAF, pilot with the expedition
- Bowman Peninsula – Named for Isaiah Bowman, American geographer.
- Orville Coast – Named for Capt. Howard T. Orville, USN, Head of the Naval Aerological Service
- Ketchum Glacier – Named for Cdr. Gerald Ketchum, USN, commander of the Burton Island
- Mount Austin (Antarctica) – Named for Stephen F. Austin, American colonizer in Texas
- Mount Edward – Named for Cdr. Edward C. Sweeney, USNR, a contributor to the expedition
- Mount Owen (Antarctica) – Named for Arthur Owen, a member of the Ronne Antarctic Research Expedition

== See also ==
- List of Antarctic expeditions
- Theodore Roosevelt McElroy
- Antarctic Conquest
