= Eights Station =

- Antarctic research station
- Location in Antarctica
- Coordinates: 75°14′00″S 77°10′00″W
- Region: Ellsworth Land
- Established: January 1963
- Closed: November 1965
- Named for: James Eights

Government
  - Type: Administration
  - Body: NSF, United States
- Active times: All year-round

Eights Station was an Antarctic permanent exploration base from January 1963 to November 1965, located on Ellsworth Land about 1100 km from Byrd Station and 2400 km from McMurdo Station. The station consisted of 11 prefabricated buildings that were brought in via planes and located on the site of the former "Sky-Hi" airlift project temporary scientific camp. The station was named for James Eights who was the first American Naturalist who visited Antarctica at the beginning of the 19th Century. The station was initially supported by 6 scientists and 5 Armed Forces attendants and included observations on meteorology, the ionosphere, geomagnetism, and aurora and radio waves. At its peak, Eights Station hosted 27 personnel, including individuals from the U.S. Antarctic Research Program Summer Party.

== See also ==
- List of Antarctic research stations
