= Ellsworth Land =

Region of Antarctica

Coordinates: 75°30′S 80°00′W

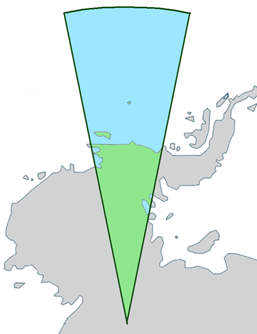
Map of Antarctica, showing Ellsworth Land

Ellsworth Land is a portion of the Antarctic continent bounded on the west by Marie Byrd Land, on the north by the Bellingshausen Sea, on the northeast by the base of the Antarctic Peninsula, and on the east by the western margin of the Filchner–Ronne Ice Shelf. It extends between 103°24'W and 79°45'W. The area west of 90°W is unclaimed, the area between 84°W and 90°W is claimed by Chile only, and the remainder by Chile and the United Kingdom as a part of the British Antarctic Territory. Eights Coast stretches between 103°24'W and 89°35'W, and Bryan Coast between 89°35'W and 79°45'W.

It is largely a high ice plateau, but includes the Ellsworth Mountains and a number of scattered mountain groups: Hudson, Jones, Behrendt, Hauberg, Merrick, Sweeney and Scaife Mountains.

This land lies near the center of the area traversed by American explorer Lincoln Ellsworth on an airplane flight during November–December 1935. It was named for him by the Advisory Committee on Antarctic Names in 1962 to commemorate that historic transcontinental flight from Dundee Island to the Ross Ice Shelf.

Information regarding the biodiversity of Ellsworth Land is comparatively limited due to the fewer research surveys and visitations in the region. Forty species of lichen and five of moss have been identified, with Usnea sphacelata being amongst the most prominent species in the region. Colonies of Adélie penguins have been observed on multiple offshore islands in the adjacent Amundsen Sea.
