= Mount Boda =

Mountain in Enderby Land, Antarctica

Mount Boda (68°5′S 48°52′E) is a mountain just north of Amphitheatre Peaks at the western end of the Nye Mountains. It was plotted from air photos taken from ANARE (Australian National Antarctic Research Expeditions) aircraft in 1956. It was named by the Antarctic Names Committee of Australia (ANCA) for Dr. J. Boda, a medical officer at Wilkes Station in 1959.
