= Luff Nunatak =

Luff Nunatak (71°6′S 71°28′E) is a narrow nunatak, 3 nautical miles (6 km) long, located west of Foster Nunatak in the Manning Nunataks of Antarctica, in the eastern part of the Amery Ice Shelf. The Manning Nunataks were photographed by U.S. Navy Operation Highjump (1946–47) and the Australian National Antarctic Research Expeditions (ANARE) (1957). They were visited by the Soviet Antarctic Expedition in 1965 and ANARE in 1969. The nunatak was named by the Antarctic Names Committee of Australia for T.S. Luff, a senior diesel mechanic at Mawson Station in 1970, and a member of the ANARE glaciological traverse party on the Amery Ice Shelf in January 1970.
