= Watts Nunatak =

Watts Nunatak (72°38′S 74°13′E) is an isolated nunatak lying 12 nautical miles (22 km) northwest of Mason Peaks in the Grove Mountains. Mapped from air photos, 1956–60, by ANARE (Australian National Antarctic Research Expeditions). Named by Antarctic Names Committee of Australia (ANCA) for J.P. Watts, supervising technician (radio) at Mawson Station, 1962.
