= Black Nunataks =

The Black Nunataks (72°59′S 74°28′E) are a group of about nine nunataks located 10 nautical miles (19 km) west-southwest of Mount Harding in the Grove Mountains, Antarctica. They were mapped by Australian National Antarctic Research Expeditions from air photos, 1956–60, and named by the Antarctic Names Committee of Australia after I. Black, a geophysicist at Mawson Station, 1963.
