= Grove Mountains =

Antarctic mountain range

Coordinates: 72°45′S 75°0′E

The Grove Mountains are a large, scattered group of mountains and nunataks extending over an area of approximately 40 by 20 miles (60 by 30 km), located 100 miles (160 km) east of the Mawson Escarpment in American Highland, Antarctica. They were first photographed from the air by aircraft of U.S. Navy Operation Highjump, 1946–47, and named by the Antarctic Names Committee of Australia for Squadron Leader I.L. Grove, a Royal Australian Air Force pilot with the Australian National Antarctic Research Expeditions, who made a November 1958 landing in these mountains.

== Features in the Grove Mountains ==
- Black Nunataks
- Bode Nunataks
- Bryse Peaks
- Cooke Peak
- Davey Nunataks
- Gale Escarpment
- Lamberts Peak
- Mason Peaks
- Melvold Nunataks
- Mount Harding
- Tate Rocks
- Truman Nunatak
- Watts Nunatak
- Wilson Ridge
- Vukovich Peaks
- Zakharoff Ridge

== See also ==
- Prince Charles Mountains
