= Truman Nunatak =

Truman Nunatak (72°44′S 75°1′E) is a small, partly snow-covered nunatak 7.5 nautical miles (14 km) north of Mount Harding in the Grove Mountains. Mapped by ANARE (Australian National Antarctic Research Expeditions) from air photos, 1956–60. Named by Antarctic Names Committee of Australia (ANCA) for M.J. Truman, electrical fitter at Mawson Station, 1962.
