= Bryse Peaks =

Mountain in the Antarctic

The Bryse Peaks (72°43′S 74°50′E) are the twin peaks of a small nunatak, located 4 nautical miles (7 km) north-northeast of Mason Peaks in the Grove Mountains. The nunatak was mapped from Australian National Antarctic Research Expeditions air photos, 1956–60, and named by the Antarctic Names Committee of Australia for R.A. Bryse, topographic draftsman, Division of National Mapping, Australian Department of National Development, who has contributed substantially to the production of Antarctic maps.
