= Ward Nunataks =

Natural feature in the Nye Mountains, Enderby Land, Antarctica

Ward Nunataks (68°7′S 49°36′E) is a linear group of nunataks 4 nautical miles (7 km) north of Alderdice Peak in the eastern part of Nye Mountains, Enderby Land. Plotted from air photos taken from Australian National Antarctic Research Expeditions (ANARE) aircraft in 1956. Named by Antarctic Names Committee of Australia (ANCA) for D.J. Ward, radio officer at Wilkes Station in 1960.
