= Melvold Nunataks =

The Melvold Nunataks (72°51′S 74°9′E) are a group of small nunataks located 14 nautical miles (26 km) west of Mount Harding in the Grove Mountains of Antarctica. They were mapped by Australian National Antarctic Research Expeditions from air photos, 1956–60, and were named by the Antarctic Names Committee of Australia for C.D. Melvold, a radio officer at Mawson Station in 1962.
