= Davey Nunataks =

The Davey Nunataks (72°58′S 74°52′E) are a group of seven nunatak lying 3 nautical miles (6 km) southwest of Mount Harding in the Grove Mountains. They were mapped by Australian National Antarctic Research Expeditions from air photos, 1956–60, and named by the Antarctic Names Committee of Australia for S.L. Davey, a topographic draftsman with the Division of National Mapping, Australian Department of National Development, who contributed substantially to the production of Antarctic maps.
