= Tate Rocks =

Coordinates: 72°40′S 74°33′E

Tate Rocks is a three small nunataks lying 7 nautical miles (13 km) north-northwest of Mason Peaks in the Grove Mountains. Mapped from air photos, 1956–60, by ANARE (Australian National Antarctic Research Expeditions) Named by Antarctic Names Committee of Australia (ANCA) for K.A. Tate, radio officer at Mawson Station, 1962.
