= Church Nunataks =

Geological feature in Antarctica

The Church Nunataks (66°48′S 52°39′E) are a line of small nunataks 1 nautical mile (2 km) northeast of Mount Smethurst and 28 nautical miles (52 km) southwest of the Stor Hanakken Mountain in Enderby Land. They were plotted from air photos taken from Australian National Antarctic Research Expeditions aircraft in 1957, and named by the Antarctic Names Committee of Australia for S.W. Church, radio officer at Wilkes Station in 1961.
