= Krasnaya Nunatak =

Mountain in Enderby Land, Antarctica

Krasnaya Nunatak (68°18′S 49°42′E) is a nunatak lying 4 nautical miles (7 km) south of Alderdice Peak in the Nye Mountains of Enderby Land, Antarctica. It was mapped, and named "Gora Krasnaya" (red mountain), by the Soviet Antarctic Expedition, 1961–62.
