= Cooke Peak =

Mountain in Princess Elizabeth Land, Antarctica

Cooke Peak (72°27′S 74°46′E) is a somewhat elongated mountain surmounted by a central peak, standing 6 nautical miles (11 km) northwest of the Bode Nunataks in the Grove Mountains. It was mapped from air photos, 1956–60, by the Australian National Antarctic Research Expeditions, and named by the Antarctic Names Committee of Australia for D.J. Cooke, a cosmic ray physicist at Mawson Station, 1963.
