= Mount Denholm =

Mountain in Enderby Land, Antarctica

Mount Denholm (68°12′S 49°7′E) is a mountain 1 nautical mile (2 km) southeast of Mount Marriner in the Nye Mountains. It was mapped from air photos taken from Australian National Antarctic Research Expeditions aircraft in 1956, and was named by the Antarctic Names Committee of Australia for J. Denholm, a physicist at Wilkes Station in 1959.
