= Lamberts Peak =

Peak in Antarctica

Lamberts Peak (72°44′S 74°51′E) is a small peak 3 nautical miles (6 km) north-northeast of the Mason Peaks in the Grove Mountains of Antarctica. It was mapped from air photos, 1956–60, by Australian National Antarctic Research Expeditions, and was named by the Antarctic Names Committee of Australia for G. Lamberts, a topographic draftsman with the Division of National Mapping at the Australian Department of National Development, who has made a substantial contribution to the compilation of Antarctic maps.
