= Krasin Nunataks =

Nunataks in Enderby Land, Antarctica

The Krasin Nunataks (68°18′S 50°5′E) are a small group of nunataks lying 10 nautical miles (19 km) southeast of Alderdice Peak in the Nye Mountains of Enderby Land, Antarctica. The features were plotted by the Soviet Antarctic Expedition, 1961–62, which named them after the Soviet icebreaker Krasin.
