= Longs Nunatak =

Nunatak in Wilkes Land, Antarctica

Longs Nunatak (66°28′S 110°43′E) is a coastal nunatak 1 nautical mile (2 km) northwest of Campbell Nunatak, facing on Penney Bay at the south end of the Windmill Islands, Antarctica. It was first mapped in 1955 from air photos taken by U.S. Navy Operation Highjump, 1946–47, and was named by Carl R. Eklund, scientific leader at Wilkes Station during the International Geophysical Year, for Robert L. Long, Jr., an ionospheric physicist at Wilkes in 1957.
