= Else Nunataks =

Nunataks in Enderby Land, Antarctica

The Else Nunataks (67°21′S 55°40′E) are a group of low, partially snow-covered nunataks located 3 nautical miles (6 km) north of Mount Oydeholmen, on the south side of Wilma Glacier, Enderby Land. They were mapped from Australian National Antarctic Research Expeditions (ANARE) surveys and air photos, 1954–66, and were named by the Antarctic Names Committee of Australia for H. Else, a pilot with ANARE (Nella Dan), 1965.
