= Tester Nunatak =

Mountain in Antarctica

Coordinates: 70°58′S 71°29′E

Tester Nunatak is the southernmost of a group of three nunataks in the northern part of the Manning Nunataks, in the east part of Amery Ice Shelf. The nunataks were photographed by U.S. Navy Operation Highjump (1946–47) and ANARE (Australian National Antarctic Research Expeditions) (1957). They were visited by the Soviet Antarctic Expedition in 1965 and by ANARE in 1969. Named by Antarctic Names Committee of Australia (ANCA) for J. Tester, aircraft engineer with the ANARE Prince Charles Mountains survey party in 1969.
