= Stanford Nunatak =

- Location within Antarctica

Geography
- Parent range: Ford Ranges

Stanford Nunatak (76°51′S 143°18′W) is a small, somewhat isolated nunatak located 3.5 nautical miles (6 km) northeast of Mount Morgan in the eastern part of the Gutenko Nunataks, Marie Byrd Land. Mapped by United States Geological Survey (USGS) from surveys and U.S. Navy air photos, 1959–65. Named by Advisory Committee on Antarctic Names (US-ACAN) for Thomas H. Stanford, ionospheric physicist at Byrd Station, 1970.
