= Bode Nunataks =

Princess Elizabeth nunataks

The Bode Nunataks (72°30′S 75°7′E) are two partly snow-covered nunataks lying 23 miles (37 km) north of Mount Harding in the Grove Mountains. Mapped from air photos, 1956–60, by Australian National Antarctic Research Expeditions, they were named by the Antarctic Names Committee of Australia for O. Bode, weather observer at Mawson Station, 1962.
