= Yingling Nunatak =

Nunatak in Wilkes Land, Antarctica

Yingling Nunatak (66°30′S 110°37′E) is a rocky nunatak just southward of the Windmill Islands, lying 0.8 miles (1.3 km) southeast of Goldenberg Ridge in the east part of Browning Peninsula. First mapped from air photos taken by U.S. Navy Operation Highjump and Operation Windmill in 1947 and 1948. Named by the Advisory Committee on Antarctic Names (US-ACAN) for David L. Yingling, meteorologist and member of the Wilkes Station party of 1960.
