= Trubyatchinskiy Nunatak =

Nunatak in Enderby Land, Antarctica

Trubyatchinskiy Nunatak (68°20′S 49°38′E) is a nunatak lying 7 nautical miles (13 km) south of Alderdice Peak in the Nye Mountains, Enderby Land. Named by the Soviet Antarctic Expedition, 1961–62, for Soviet magnetician N.N. Trubyatchinskiy (1886–1942).
