= Williams Nunatak =

Nunatak in Wilkes Land, Antarctica

Williams Nunatak (66°26′S 110°43′E) is a small coastal nunatak just east of the Windmill Islands, standing at the south side of the terminus of Peterson Glacier where it faces on Penney Bay. First mapped from air photos taken by U.S. Navy Operation Highjump in February 1947. Named by the Advisory Committee on Antarctic Names (US-ACAN) for Calvin E. Williams, member of one of the two U.S. Navy Operation Windmill photographic units which obtained ground and aerial photographic coverage of this area in January 1948.
