= Boffa Island =

Island in Antarctica

- Location within Antarctica

Geography
- Location: Antarctica
- Coordinates: 66°28′S 110°37′E
- Archipelago: Windmill Islands
- Length: 1.5 km (0.93 mi)

Administration
- Administered under the Antarctic Treaty System

Demographics
- Population: Uninhabited

Boffa Island is a rocky, ridge-like Antarctic island, 1.5 km (0.8 nmi) long, lying half a kilometre east of Browning Peninsula between Bosner and Birkenhauer Islands, in the south part of the Windmill Islands. It was first mapped by USN Operation Highjump and Operation Windmill in 1947 and 1948. Named by the US-ACAN for W. C. Boffa, observer with the then Army Strategic Air Command (SAC), who assisted Operation Windmill parties in establishing astronomical control stations in the area in January 1948.

== See also ==
- Composite Antarctic Gazetteer
- List of Antarctic and sub-Antarctic islands
- List of Antarctic islands south of 60° S
- SCAR
- Territorial claims in Antarctica
