= Denholm (surname) =

Denholm is a surname. Notable people with the surname include:

- Anne Denholm (born 1991), Welsh harpist
- Danny Denholm (born 1990), Scottish footballer
- David Denholm (1924–1997), Australian historian and author
- Frank E. Denholm (1923–2016), American politician
- George Denholm (1908–1997), British fighter pilot
- Iain Denholm (born 1948), Scottish footballer
- Lynn Denholm (born 1939), Australian cricketer
- Nikki Denholm, New Zealand humanitarian and photographer
- Noël Denholm-Young, English historian
- Robyn Denholm (born 1962/1963), Australian businesswoman, chair of Tesla, Inc.
- Tabitha Denholm (born 1975), British director of music videos, documentary shorts and commercials

== See also ==
- Noël Denholm-Young (1904-1975), English historian
- Denholm (disambiguation)
