= Dwyer Nunataks =

Mountain in antarctica

The Dwyer Nunataks (68°13′S 58°27′E) are a scattered group of low peaks and ridges about 6 nautical miles (11 km) long and 3 nautical miles (6 km) wide, lying 2 nautical miles (4 km) southeast of Mount Gjeita in the Hansen Mountains of Antarctica. They were plotted from Australian National Antarctic Research Expeditions air photos and were named by the Antarctic Names Committee of Australia after V. Dwyer, a radio officer at Mawson Station in 1964, and a member of one of the survey parties which carried out a tellurometer traverse passing through the Hansen Mountains in 1965.
