= Mount Henry =

Mount Henry may refer to one of these mountains:

- Mount Henry (Alberta), Canada
- Mount Henry (California), in Kings Canyon National Park
- Mount Henry (Montana), in Glacier National Park, United States
- Mount Henry (Enderby Land), in Antarctica
- Mount Henry (Ross Dependency), in Antarctica

== See also ==
- Mount Henry Lucy, in Antarctica
- Mount Henry Peninsula, a peninsula in Western Australia
- Henry Mountain, a mountain in Colorado
- Henry Mountains, a mountain range in Utah
