= Denholm (disambiguation) =

Denholm is a village in the Borders region of Scotland.

Denholm may also refer to:

== Places ==
- Denholm, Quebec, a municipality in Canada
- Denholm, Saskatchewan, a village in Canada
- Mount Denholm, a mountain in Antarctica

== People ==
- Denholm (surname)
- Denholm Elliott (1922–1992), English actor
- Alexander Denholm Brash (1874–1943), British bookseller, stationer and postcard publisher
- George Denholm Armour (1864–1949), British painter and illustrator
- Noel Denholm Davis (1876–1950), English artist
- Robert "Bobby" Denholm Baxter (1911–1991), Scottish footballer best known for his time with English club Middlesbrough
- William Denholm Barnetson (1917–1981), British newspaper proprietor and television executive
- William Denholm Kennedy (1813–1865), Scottish historical, genre and landscape painter

== Other uses ==
- Denholm Group, a British maritime company based in Glasgow, United Kingdom

== See also ==
- Dänholm, a small island on the German coast of the Baltic Sea
- Denholm & McKay (Denholm's), a former department store located in Worcester, Massachusetts
- Denholme, a town and civil parish in the Bradford Metropolitan Borough, West Yorkshire, England
- Hawick and Denholm (ward), an electoral division in the Scottish Borders Council
- Serco Denholm, a joint venture between Serco Group and Denholm Group
- Denholm Reynholm, character from the British sitcom The IT Crowd
