= Zakharoff Ridge =

Ridge in Antarctica

Zakharoff Ridge (72°55′S 75°7′E) is a ridge with several peaks, mostly snow-covered, 2.4 km (1.5 mi) southeast of Mount Harding in the Grove Mountains. Mapped by ANARE (Australian National Antarctic Research Expeditions) from air photos, 1956–60, it was named by Antarctic Names Committee of Australia (ANCA) for Oleg Zakharoff, radio officer at Mawson Station, in 1960.
