= Grayson Nunatak =

Nunatak in Marie Byrd Land, Antarctica

Grayson Nunatak (76°47′S 143°38′W) is a nunatak situated 3 nautical miles (6 km) west of Crummey Nunatak in Antarctica. It is the northwesternmost feature of the Gutenko Nunataks, in the Ford Ranges of Marie Byrd Land. The nunatak was discovered and first mapped by the United States Antarctic Service, 1939–41. It was remapped by the United States Geological Survey from surveys and U.S. Navy aerial photography, 1959–65, and was named by the Advisory Committee on Antarctic Names for Donald E. Grayson, an engineer at Byrd Station, 1970.
