= Cordwell =

Cordwell may refer to:

- Cordwell, Derbyshire, a settlement in Derbyshire, England
- Cordwell, Norfolk, a settlement in Norfolk, England
- Cordwell (surname)
- 21425 Cordwell, an asteroid
- Mount Cordwell, a mountain in Antarctica
