= Kjuklingen Nunatak =

Mountain in Antarctica

Kjuklingen Nunatak (68°13′S 58°27′E) is one of the Dwyer Nunataks, lying 1.5 nautical miles (3 km) east of Mount Gjeita in the Hansen Mountains of Antarctica. It was mapped and named Kjuklingen (the chicken) by Norwegian cartographers working from air photos taken by the Lars Christensen Expedition, 1936–37.
