= Amphitheatre Lake (Antarctica) =

- Location within Antarctica
- Location: Antarctica
- Coordinates: 68°6′S 48°45′E
- Type: meltwater lake

Amphitheatre Lake is a smooth-surfaced meltwater lake 1.5 nautical miles (3 km) long in the western part of the Amphitheatre Peaks, in the Nye Mountains of Antarctica. The lake is almost completely enclosed by rock and ice cliffs, forming an amphitheatre, with an outlet into Rayner Glacier at the west end. It was photographed in 1956 from Australian National Antarctic Research Expeditions (ANARE) aircraft and visited by an ANARE airborne field party in 1958. The descriptive name was applied by the Antarctic Names Committee of Australia.
