= Pauley =

Pauley may refer to:

- Pauley, Kentucky, an unincorporated community in the United States

== People with the surname ==
- Aaron Pauley (born 1988), American musician
- Art Pauley (1905–1984), American historian and author
- Cecil De Pauley (1893–1968), Church of Ireland bishop and author
- David Pauley (born 1983), American baseball player
- Edwin W. Pauley (1903–1981), American oilman and political appointee
- Graham Pauley (born 2000), American baseball player
- Jane Pauley (born 1950), American television journalist
- Laura Pauley, American mechanical engineer
- Mieka Pauley (born 1980), American singer-songwriter and guitarist
- Patricia Pauley (born 1941), British former figure skater
- Paul Pauley (1886–1938), French actor
- Robert Pauley (1923–2009), American radio broadcasting executive
- William H. Pauley III (1952–2021), United States federal judge

== People with the given name ==
- Pauley Perrette (born 1969), American actress, known for playing Abby Sciuto on NCIS

== See also ==
- Pauley Pavilion, arena in Los Angeles, California, on the campus of UCLA
- Pauly (disambiguation)
- Pawley (disambiguation)
