= Syningen Nunatak =

Travellers guide to Nunatak

Syningen Nunatak (68°20′S 59°9′E) is a nunatak 1 mile (1.6 km) south of See Nunatak in the eastern part of the Hansen Mountains. Mapped and named by Norwegian cartographers from air photos taken by the Lars Christensen Expedition, 1936–37.
