= Campbell Nunatak =

Nunatak in Wilkes Land, Antarctica

Campbell Nunatak (66°29′S 110°45′E) is a coastal nunatak at the southeast limit of the Windmill Islands, overlooking the southeast extremity of Penney Bay 3 nautical miles (6 km) east-northeast of the Alexander Nunataks. It was first mapped from air photos taken by U.S. Navy Operation Highjump and Operation Windmill in 1947 and 1948, and named by the Advisory Committee on Antarctic Names for H. Campbell, Jr., a member of one of the two Operation Windmill photographic units which obtained air and ground photos of the area in January 1948.
