= Purka Mountain =

Mountain in Antarctica

Purka Mountain (68°15′S 58°35′E) is a prominent mountain ridge with two outliers, about 5 nautical miles (9 km) southeast of Mount Gjeita in the Hansen Mountains. Mapped and named Purka (the sow) by Norwegian cartographers working from air photos taken by the Lars Christensen Expedition, 1936–37.

== See also ==
- Galtefjellet
