= Gale Escarpment =

Gale Escarpment (72°55′S 75°23′E) is a northwest-facing escarpment of rock and ice, standing eastward of Mount Harding and Wilson Ridge in the Grove Mountains of Antarctica. It was mapped from air photos, 1956–60, by ANAPL, and was named by the Antarctic Names Committee of Australia for d'A.T. Gale, officer in charge of the Antarctic Mapping Branch, Australian Division of National Mapping, who has contributed substantially to Antarctic mapping.
