= Bain Nunatak =

Manning Nunataks

Bain Nunatak (71°6′S 71°35′E) is one of the Manning Nunataks, on the east side of the Amery Ice Shelf. The nunataks were photographed by U.S. Navy Operation Highjump (1946–47) and Australian National Antarctic Research Expeditions (ANARE) (1957). They were visited by the Soviet Antarctic Expedition in 1965 and by the ANARE Prince Charles Mountains survey party in 1969. This feature was named for C.J. Bain, weather observer at Mawson Station in 1969 and a member of the 1969 ANARE survey party.
