= Gromov Nunataks =

Nunataks in Enderby Land, Antarctica

The Gromov Nunataks (67°45′S 50°40′E) are a group of nunataks lying 7 nautical miles (13 km) east-southeast of Mount Henry in the Scott Mountains of Enderby Land, Antarctica. They were named by the Soviet Antarctic Expedition, 1961–62, for M.M. Gromov, a Soviet pilot.
