= Crosby Nunataks =

Nunataks in Enderby Land, Antarctica

The Crosby Nunataks (66°46′S 51°33′E) are a set of three nunataks 2 nautical miles (4 km) northeast of Mount Morrison, in the northern part of the Tula Mountains in Enderby Land. They were plotted from air photos taken from Australian National Antarctic Research Expeditions aircraft in 1956, and named by the Antarctic Names Committee of Australia for W.E. Crosby, a member of the crew of Discovery during the British Australian New Zealand Antarctic Research Expedition, 1929–31.
