= Trost Rocks =

Trost Rocks (69°45′S 68°58′E) is a two rock outcrops at the northeast end of Single Island on the west side of the Amery Ice Shelf. The rocks were photographed from ANARE (Australian National Antarctic Research Expeditions) aircraft in 1956 and their position fixed by a field party in December 1962. Named by Antarctic Names Committee of Australia (ANCA) for P.A. Trost, electronics engineer at Mawson Station in 1962, a member of the field party which visited the rocks.
