= Solitary Nunatak =

Geographical feature in Antarctica

Solitary Nunatak (67°28′S 58°46′E) is a small isolated nunatak 14 nautical miles (26 km) southeast of Svart Peak in Enderby Land. Mapped from ANARE (Australian National Antarctic Research Expeditions) surveys and air photos, 1954–66, and so named because of its isolated position.
