= Mount Paish =

Mountain in Antarctica

Mount Paish (66°51′S 52°48′E) is a mountain 1.5 nautical miles (2.8 km) east of Mount Torckler and 27 nautical miles (50 km) southwest of Stor Hanakken Mountain in Enderby Land. It was plotted from air photos taken from ANARE (Australian National Antarctic Research Expeditions) aircraft in 1957 and was named by the Antarctic Names Committee of Australia (ANCA) for P.G. Paish, a weather observer at Wilkes Station in 1961.
