= Wallis Nunataks =

Nunataks in Enderby Land, Antarctica

Wallis Nunataks (66°52′S 55°39′E) is a group of four nunataks with steep rock faces on their south and east sides, standing 4 nautical miles (7 km) east-northeast of Mount Storegutt in Enderby Land. Mapped from ANARE (Australian National Antarctic Research Expeditions) surveys and air photos, 1954–66. Named by Antarctic Names Committee of Australia (ANCA) for G.R. Wallis, geologist with the ANARE (Nella Dan), 1965.
