= Billingane Peaks =

Peaks in Antarctica

The Billingane Peaks (68°21′S 59°18′E) are a cluster of four peaks, about 5 nautical miles (10 km) east-southeast of See Nunatak at the eastern end of the Hansen Mountains in Antarctica. They were mapped and named by Norwegian cartographers working from air photos taken by the Lars Christensen Expedition, 1936–37.
