= Laputa (disambiguation) =

Laputa is a fictional country from the book Gulliver's Travels, by Jonathan Swift.

Laputa may also refer to:

== Arts and entertainment ==
=== Music ===
- Laputa (band), a now-disbanded Japanese rock band
- "Laputa", a song by Panchiko

=== Film ===
- Laputa (German film), a 1986 drama film directed by Helma Sanders-Brahms
- Laputa: Castle in the Sky, 1986 animated film by Hayao Miyazaki

== Places ==
- 1819 Laputa, the asteroid Laputa, a main-belt asteroid, the 1819th asteroid registered
- Laputa Nunataks (Laputa Mountains), Graham Land, Antarctic Peninsula, Antarctica

== Other uses ==
- Mazda Laputa, an SUV/keicar vehicle created by Mazda
