= Vukovich Peaks =

Vukovich Peaks (72°23′S 74°59′E) are two well-defined peaks surmounting the northernmost rock outcrop in the Grove Mountains. Mapped from air photos, 1956–60, by ANARE (Australian National Antarctic Research Expeditions). Named by Antarctic Names Committee of Australia (ANCA) for J.N. Vukovich, weather observer at Mawson Station, 1963.
