= Papanin =

Papanin (Russian: Папанин; masculine) or Papanina (feminine) may refer to

- Ivan Papanin (1894–1986), Soviet polar explorer and scientist
- Ivan Papanin, a Russian icebreaking patrol ship
- Papanin Nunataks, a group of ridges in Antarctica
- Papanin, a village in Belarus
