= Kenneth Ridge =

Mountain in Antarctica

Kenneth Ridge (70°57′S 71°30′E) is the northernmost of three rock outcrops in the northern part of the Manning Nunataks, Antarctica. The nunataks were photographed by U.S. Navy Operation Highjump (1946–47) and Australian National Antarctic Research Expeditions (ANARE) (1957). They were visited by the Soviet Antarctic Expedition in 1965 and by ANARE in 1969, and were named by the Antarctic Names Committee of Australia for Kenneth A. Smith, a radio officer at Mawson Station in 1969, and a member of the ANARE Prince Charles Mountains survey party in the same year.
