= Papanin Nunataks =

Nunataks in Enderby Land, Antarctica

Papanin Nunataks (68°13′S 50°15′E) is a small group of nunataks lying 11 nautical miles (20 km) east of Alderdice Peak in the Nye Mountains, Enderby Land. Named by the Soviet Antarctic Expedition (1961–62) for Soviet polar expert Admiral Ivan D. Papanin.
