= Foster Nunatak =

Foster Nunatak (71°6′S 71°40′E) is a horseshoe-shaped rock outcrop in the south part of the Manning Nunataks, on the east side of the Amery Ice Shelf, Antarctica. The Manning Nunataks were photographed by U.S. Navy Operation Highjump (1946–47) and Australian National Antarctic Research Expeditions (ANARE) (1957). They were visited by the Soviet Antarctic Expedition in 1965 and ANARE in 1969. This nunatak was named by the Antarctic Names Committee of Australia for A.L. Foster, an electronics engineer at Mawson Station in 1970, and a member of an ANARE glaciological traverse party on the Amery Ice Shelf in January 1970.
