= Amphitheatre Peaks =

Group of peaks of the Nye Mountains near Amphitheatre Lake in Antarctica

- Location within Antarctica

Naming
- Etymology: Amphitheatre Lake

Geography
- Continent: Antarctica
- Range coordinates: 68°6′S 48°52′E
- Parent range: Nye Mountains

Climbing
- First ascent: ANARE (1958)

The Amphitheatre Peaks (68°6′S 48°52′E) are a group of peaks surrounding and extending to the east of Amphitheatre Lake, in the northwest part of Nye Mountains of Antarctica. They were photographed in 1956 from Australian National Antarctic Research Expeditions (ANARE) aircraft and visited in November 1958 by an ANARE airborne field party. They were named by the Antarctic Names Committee of Australia in association with Amphitheatre Lake.
