= Kyle Nunataks =

Nunataks in Enderby Land, Antarctica

The Kyle Nunataks (66°47′S 51°20′E) are three nunataks 2.5 nautical miles (5 km) east of Mount Hampson, in the northern part of the Tula Mountains in Enderby Land, Antarctica. They were plotted from air photos taken from Australian National Antarctic Research Expeditions aircraft in 1956, and were named by the Antarctic Names Committee of Australia for J.T. Kyle, a member of the crew of the Discovery during the British Australian New Zealand Antarctic Research Expedition, 1929–31.
