= Haupt Nunatak =

Nunatak in Wilkes Land, Antarctica

Haupt Nunatak (66°35′S 110°41′E) is a small nunatak 5 nautical miles (9 km) south of the Alexander Nunataks, at the east side of the lower reaches of Vanderford Glacier in Antarctica. It was mapped from aerial photographs taken by U.S. Navy Operation Highjump, 1946–47, and named by the Advisory Committee on Antarctic Names for Ensign Richard W. Haupt, U.S. Navy, an assistant hydrographic officer with U.S. Navy Operation Windmill 1947–48, who assisted the shore parties which established astronomical control stations from Wilhelm II Coast to Budd Coast.
