= Fyfe Hills =

Hills in Antarctica

The Fyfe Hills (67°22′S 49°12′E) are a group of low coastal hills in Enderby Land, Antarctica. Located south of Dingle Dome and immediately east of the Hydrographer Islands. They were sighted in October 1957 by an Australian National Antarctic Research Expeditions party led by B.H. Stinear, and were named by the Antarctic Names Committee of Australia for W.V. Fyfe, who served as the Surveyor General of Western Australia.
