= McCarthy Nunatak =

McCarthy Nunatak (69°7′S 64°45′E) is a small nunatak, the top of which is almost at the same level as the surrounding ice plateau, about 5 nautical miles (9 km) southeast of Depot Peak, Mac. Robertson Land, Antarctica. It was discovered from Australian National Antarctic Research Expeditions (ANARE) aircraft in 1970, and was named by the Antarctic Names Committee of Australia after I. McCarthy, a senior weather observer at Mawson Station in 1970, and a member of the ANARE Prince Charles Mountains survey party in 1971.
