= New Year Nunatak =

Mountain in Antarctica

New Year Nunatak (71°4′S 71°30′E)* is a nunatak in the central part of the Manning Nunataks in the southeast part of Amery Ice Shelf. Plotted from air photos taken by ANARE (Australian National Antarctic Research Expeditions) in 1957. So named by Antarctic Names Committee of Australia (ANCA) because the nunatak was visited by a geological party of the Soviet Antarctic Expedition on New Year's Day of 1966.

- "Name Details: Haigh Nunatak". Antarctic Gazetter. Australian Antarctic Data Centre.
