= Mount Stadler =

Mountain in Enderby Land, Antarctica

Mount Stadler (66°55′S 53°14′E) is a mountain 2.5 nautical miles (4.6 km) southeast of Mount Cordwell and 23 nautical miles (43 km) south-southwest of Stor Hanakken Mountain in Enderby Land. It was plotted from air photos taken from ANARE (Australian National Antarctic Research Expeditions) aircraft in 1957 and was named by the Antarctic Names Committee of Australia (ANCA) for S. Stadler, a weather observer at Wilkes Station in 1961.
