= Alexander Nunataks =

Pair of nunataks in Wilkes Land, Antarctica

Highest point
- Coordinates: 66°30′S 110°39′E

Geography
- Location: Windmill Islands, Antarctica

Geology
- Mountain type: Coastal nunataks

The Alexander Nunataks (66°30′S 110°39′E) are two coastal nunataks at the southern limit of the Windmill Islands, standing on the shore of Penney Bay 0.4 nautical miles (0.7 km) east of the base of the Browning Peninsula. They were first mapped from air photos taken by U.S. Navy Operation Highjump and Operation Windmill in 1947 and 1948, and named by the Advisory Committee on Antarctic Names for Photographer's Mate H.N. Alexander, a member of one of the two Operation Windmill photographic units that obtained air and ground photos of the area in January 1948.
