= Mount Jewell =

Mountain in Enderby Land, Antarctica

Mount Jewell (66°57′S 53°9′E) is a mountain 3 nautical miles (6 km) south of Mount Cordwell and 25 nautical miles (46 km) south-southwest of Stor Hanakken Mountain in Enderby Land, Antarctica. It was plotted from air photos taken from Australian National Antarctic Research Expeditions aircraft in 1957, and was named by the Antarctic Names Committee of Australia for F. Jewell, a geophysicist at Wilkes Station in 1961.
