= Mount McGhee =

Mountain in Enderby Land, Antarctica

Mount McGhee (66°56′S 52°39′E) is a mountain 4 nautical miles (7.4 km) south of Mount Smethurst in Enderby Land, Antarctica. It was plotted from air photos taken from Australian National Antarctic Research Expeditions aircraft in 1957 and was named by the Antarctic Names Committee of Australia for J. McGhee, a mechanic and driver at Wilkes Station in 1961.
