= Brusen Nunatak =

Antarctic mountain peak

Brusen Nunatak (68°12′S 58°13′E) is a lone peak 3 nautical miles (6 km) west of Mount Gjeita in the Hansen Mountains. It was mapped and named by Norwegian cartographers working from air photos taken by the Lars Christensen Expedition, 1936–37.
