= Pawley =

Pawley may refer to:

- Alice Pawley, American scholar of engineering education
- Andrew Pawley (1941–2026), Australian linguist
- Bernard Pawley (1911–1981), Anglican priest
- Edward Pawley (1901–1988), American actor
- Howard Pawley (1934–2015), Canadian politician and professor
- William D. Pawley (1896–1977), American ambassador and businessman

== See also ==
- Pawley Nunataks, a line of four nunataks in Palmer Land, Antarctica
- Pawleys Island, South Carolina, a town in the United States
- Pauley (disambiguation)
