= Braddock Nunataks =

Nunatak group in Palmer Land, Antarctica

The Braddock Nunataks (70°48′S 65°55′W) are a group of prominent nunataks located inland from Bertram Glacier and 9 nautical miles (17 km) southeast of Perseus Crags on the west margin of the Dyer Plateau, in Palmer Land. They were mapped by the United States Geological Survey in 1974, and named by the Advisory Committee on Antarctic Names for Lieutenant Robert L. Braddock, Jr., CEC, U.S. Navy, Officer-in-Charge of the South Pole Station in 1974.
