= Doggers Bay =

Bay in Antarctica

Doggers Bay (69°7′S 69°9′E) is an ice-filled bay about 16 nautical miles (30 km) long and 5 nautical miles (9 km) wide on the west side of the Amery Ice Shelf, between Foley Promontory and Landon Promontory. It was plotted from Australian National Antarctic Research Expeditions (ANARE) air photos taken in 1956, was first visited in November 1962 by an ANARE dog-sledge party led by I. Landon-Smith, and was named by the Antarctic Names Committee of Australia after the dog-sledge party.
