= American Highland =

Plateau in Antarctica

- Plateau
- Location within Antarctica
- Coordinates: 72°30′S 78°00′E
- Location: Antarctica
- Elevation: 2,800 metres (9,200 ft)

The American Highland is the portion of Antarctica back of the Ingrid Christensen Coast and eastward of Lambert Glacier, consisting of an upland snow surface at 2,800 metres (9,200 ft) except for a group of nunataks (the Grove Mountains) near 75°E. The area was discovered and named by Lincoln Ellsworth on January 11, 1939, in an aerial flight from his ship, and by Australian National Antarctic Research Expeditions (1956 and 1957), the latter group making a landing to obtain an astrofix at Grove Mountains, 1958.
