= Wilson Ridge =

Wilson Ridge (72°48′S 75°5′E) is a prominent razorback ridge 6 nautical miles (11 km) north of Mount Harding in the Grove Mountains. Mapped by ANARE (Australian National Antarctic Research Expeditions) from air photos, 1956–60. Named by Antarctic Names Committee of Australia (ANCA) for R.R. Wilson, topographic draftsman, Division of National Mapping, Australian Dept. of National Development, who has contributed substantially to the compilation of Antarctic maps.
