= Miller Nunataks =

Nunataks in Enderby Land, Antarctica

The Miller Nunataks (67°2′S 55°11′E) are a group of nunataks standing 11 nautical miles (20 km) southwest of Mount Storegutt in Enderby Land, Antarctica. They were mapped from Australian National Antarctic Research Expeditions surveys and air photos from 1954 to 1966, and were named by the Antarctic Names Committee of Australia for K.R. Miller, a weather observer at Mawson Station in 1962.
