= Ranney Nunatak =

Nunatak in Marie Byrd Land, Antarctica

Ranney Nunatak (76°53′S 143°55′W) is a nunatak in the southwest extremity of Gutenko Nunataks, in the Ford Ranges of Marie Byrd Land. It was first mapped by the United States Antarctic Service (USAS), 1939–41, and named by Advisory Committee on Antarctic Names (US-ACAN) for Charles R. Ranney, ionospheric physicist at Byrd Station, 1969.
