= Foley Promontory =

Foley Promontory (68°57′S 69°24′E) is an ice-covered promontory about 5 nautical miles (10 km) north of Landon Promontory, across Doggers Bay, on the west side of the Amery Ice Shelf, Antarctica. It was plotted from Australian National Antarctic Research Expeditions (ANARE) air photos taken in 1956, and was first visited by an ANARE party led by D.R. Carstens in November 1962. It was named by the Antarctic Names Committee of Australia for N.E. Foley, a weather observer at Mawson Station in 1962, and a member of the field party.
