= Eyres =

Eyres may refer to:

== People ==
- Annabel Eyres (born 1965), British rower and artist
- Bolton Eyres-Monsell, 1st Viscount Monsell (1881–1969), British politician
- David Eyres (born 1964), English football player
- Erica Eyres (born 1980), Canadian artist
- Gordon Eyres (1912–2004), Australian cricket player
- Graham Eyres-Monsell, 2nd Viscount Monsell
- Harry Charles Augustus Eyres (1856–1944), British diplomat
- Harry Eyres, British journalist, writer and poet
- Jack Eyres (1899–1975), English football player
- Leslie Harvey Eyres (1892–1983), Canadian politician
- Nathan Eyres-Brown (born 1989), Australian rugby union football player
- Richard Eyres (born 1966), English rugby league and rugby union football player
- Robert Eyres Landor Landor (1781–1869), English writer, dramatist, poet and clergyman

== Places ==
- Eyres Bay, Antarctica
- Eyres Monsell, England
- Eyres-Moncube, France

== Other ==
- Eyres skink, species of skink
