= Wyers Nunataks =

Nunataks in Enderby Land, Antarctica

Wyers Nunataks (67°13′S 49°43′E) is a group of nunataks at the base of Sakellari Peninsula, just west of Wyers Ice Shelf in Enderby Land. Plotted from air photos taken from ANARE (Australian National Antarctic Research Expeditions) aircraft in 1956 and 1957. Named by Antarctic Names Committee of Australia (ANCA) for R.W.L. Wyers, glaciologist at Mawson Station in 1961.
