= Crummey =

Crummey is a surname. Notable people with the surname include:

- Andrew Crummey (born 1984), American football guard
- Joe Crummey, American radio talk show host
- Louise McKinney née Crummey (1868–1931), politician and women's rights activist from Alberta, Canada
- Michael Crummey (born 1965), Canadian poet and writer
- P. W. Crummey (1891–1960), public figure in Newfoundland

== See also ==
- Crummey Nunatak
- Crummey trust for the benefit of a minor
- Cramme
- Grumme
