= Mount Marriner =

Mountain in Enderby Land, Antarctica

Mount Marriner (68°10′S 49°3′E) is a mountain 2 nautical miles (4 km) west-southwest of Mount Flett in the central Nye Mountains of Antarctica. It was plotted from air photos taken from Australian National Antarctic Research Expeditions aircraft in 1956 and was named by the Antarctic Names Committee of Australia for A. Marriner, a radio officer at Wilkes Station in 1959.
