= Melfjellet =

Rock outcrop in Kemp Land, Antarctica

Melfjellet (68°21′S 59°12′E) is a prominent rock outcrop in the eastern part of the Hansen Mountains, Antarctica, about 2 nautical miles (4 km) southeast of See Nunatak. It was mapped and named by Norwegian cartographers from air photos taken by the Lars Christensen Expedition, 1936–37.
