= Mitchell Nunatak =

Mountain in Antarctica

Mitchell Nunatak (70°58′S 71°30′E) is the central nunatak in a group of three nunataks in the northern part of the Manning Nunataks in Antarctica. The Manning Nunataks were photographed by U.S. Navy Operation Highjump in 1946–47, and by the Australian National Antarctic Research Expeditions (ANARE) in 1957. They were visited by the Soviet Antarctic Expedition in 1965 and by the ANARE Prince Charles Mountains survey party in 1969. This nunatak was named by the Antarctic Names Committee of Australia for R. Mitchell, a senior diesel mechanic at Mawson Station in 1969.
