= Pickering Nunatak =

Nunatak in Lambert Glacier, Antarctica

Pickering Nunatak (71°24′S 70°47′E) is a prominent nunatak at the east side of the mouth of Lambert Glacier, situated 20 nautical miles (37 km) south-southwest of Manning Nunataks. Sighted on a flight by an ANARE (Australian National Antarctic Research Expeditions) Beaver aircraft over the Amery Ice Shelf on November 2, 1957. Named by Antarctic Names Committee of Australia (ANCA) for Flight Sgt. R. Pickering of the RAAF Antarctic Flight at Mawson Station, 1957.
