= Walker Nunatak =

Walker Nunatak (67°55′S 63°15′E) is a small nunatak 10 nautical miles (18 km) east of Branson Nunatak on the east edge of the Framnes Mountains, Mac. Robertson Land. Photographed from ANARE (Australian National Antarctic Research Expeditions) aircraft in 1962, and seen by an ANARE dog-sledge party in January 1963. Named by Antarctic Names Committee of Australia (ANCA) for K.G. Walker, assistant cook at Mawson Station in 1962, a member of the sledge party.
