= Single Island =

Antarctic island

- Location within Antarctica

Geography
- Location: Antarctica
- Coordinates: 69°48′S 68°36′E

Administration
- Administered under the Antarctic Treaty System

Demographics
- Population: Uninhabited

Single Island is a high ice-covered island on the west side of the Amery Ice Shelf, about 26 kilometres (14 nmi) south of Landon Promontory. It was first plotted by ANARE (Australian National Antarctic Research Expeditions) from air photos taken in 1956, but incorrectly shown as a promontory; later, it was mapped by ANARE as an island. It was named by Antarctic Names Committee of Australia (ANCA) for M. Single, senior diesel mechanic at Mawson Station in 1962, a member of the ANARE field party which visited the area in December 1962.

== Dodson Rocks ==
The Dodson Rocks (69°55′S 68°25′E) are two small, dark rock exposures on the south side of Single Island, on the west side of the Amery Ice Shelf. They were discovered from an Australian National Antarctic Research Expeditions (ANARE) aircraft in 1969, photographed from an ANARE aircraft in 1971, and named for R. Dodson, senior geologist with the ANARE Prince Charles Mountains survey in 1971.

== Tingey Rocks ==
Tingey Rocks are two small rock features located southwest of Single Island, also discovered by ANARE. Named by ANCA for R.J. Tingey, geologist with the party.

== See also ==
- List of Antarctic and sub-Antarctic islands
