= Pauly (disambiguation) =

Pauly is a 1997 comedy television series.

Pauly may also refer to:

== People ==
- Pauly (surname), list of people with the surname Pauly
- Pauly Shore (born 1968), American actor and comedian
- Pauly Burke (born 1974), American road racing cyclist
- Pauly D (born 1980), American television personality and disc jockey
- Pauly Falzoni, fictitious character in Australian film Fat Pizza
- Pauly Fuemana (1969–2010), New Zealand singer, songwriter and musician
- Pauly Paulicap (born 1997), American basketball player
- Pauly Thomaselli, ring name of American professional wrestler Brandon Thomas
- Pauly Valsan, Indian actress

== Other uses ==
- Pauly, Ivory Coast, a coastal village in Bas-Sassandra District, Ivory Coast
- 537 Pauly, an asteroid
- Realencyclopädie der classischen Altertumswissenschaft, also known as the "Pauly-Wissowa encyclopedia"
- J. Pauly & Sohn, one of the oldest bedding companies in the world

== See also ==
- Pauley (disambiguation)
- Paul (disambiguation)
- Pearly (disambiguation)
