= Friedmann Nunataks =

Nunatak group in Palmer Land, Antarctica

The Friedmann Nunataks (70°55′S 65°30′W) are a small group of nunataks 6 nautical miles (11 km) southeast of the Braddock Nunataks on the western margin of Dyer Plateau, Palmer Land, Antarctica. They were mapped by the United States Geological Survey in 1974, and named by the Advisory Committee on Antarctic Names for Herbert Friedmann of the Smithsonian Institution, author of Birds of the United States Antarctic Service Expedition, 1939–41 (Proceedings of the American Philosophical Society, Vol. 89, 1945).
