= Heverley Nunataks =

The Heverley Nunataks (75°33′S 128°34′W) are small, relatively isolated nunataks protruding through the ice 14 nautical miles (26 km) northeast of the summit of Mount Flint in the McCuddin Mountains of Marie Byrd Land, Antarctica. They were mapped by the United States Geological Survey from surveys and U.S. Navy air photos, 1959–69, and were named by the Advisory Committee on Antarctic Names for Harry W. Heverley, a U.S. Navy builder who was a member of the winter party at South Pole Station in 1971, and at McMurdo Station in 1962 and 1966.
