= Striated Nunatak =

Nunatak in Enderby Land, Antarctica

Striated Nunatak (67°21′S 56°13′E) is a low, rounded nunatak of banded gneiss 6 nautical miles (11 km) east-northeast of Rayner Peak, on the east side of Robert Glacier, Enderby Land. Mapped from ANARE (Australian National Antarctic Research Expeditions) surveys and air photos, 1934–66, and so named because the surface of the nunatak displays a remarkable development of striations, grooves, and polishing caused by ice movement across its surface.
