= Taurus Nunataks =

Nunatak group in Palmer Land, Antarctica

Taurus Nunataks (70°52′S 66°23′W) is a line of three nunataks running east–west, with only the outer two of any prominence, located 23 nautical miles (43 km) east-northeast of Gurney Point in Palmer Land. Named by United Kingdom Antarctic Place-Names Committee (UK-APC) after the constellation of Taurus.
