= Sanders Nunatak =

Nunatak in Victoria Land, Antarctica

Coordinates: 77°33′32″S 163°02′28″E

Sanders Nunatak is a prominent (850 m) nunatak rising above the ice to the south of Noxon Cliff, in Asgard Range, Victoria Land, Antarctica. It was named by the Advisory Committee on Antarctic Names in 1997 after Ryan Sanders, of NOAA, a member of the National Ozone Expedition to the McMurdo Station area in 1986 and 1987, returning as principal investigator in 1991, 1992, 1994, and 1996.
