= Crummey Nunatak =

Nunatak in Marie Byrd Land, Antarctica

Crummey Nunatak (76°48′S 143°36′W) is a linear rock nunatak, 1.5 nautical miles (3 km) long, at the northeast end of the Gutenko Nunataks in the Ford Ranges of Marie Byrd Land. It was first mapped by the United States Antarctic Service, 1939–41, and named by the Advisory Committee on Antarctic Names for Glen T. Crummey, U.S. Navy, a Construction Electrician at Byrd Station, 1967.
