= Kozlov Nunataks =

Nunataks in Enderby Land, Antarctica

The Kozlov Nunataks (66°37′S 51°7′E) are a group of nunataks lying 8 nautical miles (15 km) north of Mount Parviainen in the Tula Mountains of Enderby Land, Antarctica. The nunataks were visited by geologists of the Soviet Antarctic Expedition, 1961–62, who named them for M.I. Kozlov, a Soviet polar pilot.
