= Tern Nunatak =

Tern Nunatak (62°6′S 58°20′W) is a nunatak lying just east of Lussich Cove, Admiralty Bay, on King George Island in the South Shetland Islands. Charted but not named by the French Antarctic Expedition, 1908–10, under Charcot. The name Tern Nunatak became established in local use at the Falkland Islands Dependencies Survey (FIDS) Admiralty Bay station in about 1949.
