= Bosner Island =

Island in Antarctica

- Location within Antarctica

Geography
- Location: Antarctica
- Coordinates: 66°27′S 110°36′E
- Archipelago: Windmill Islands
- Length: 0.6 km (0.37 mi)

Administration
- Administered under the Antarctic Treaty System

Demographics
- Population: Uninhabited

Bosner Island is an Antarctic rocky island, 0.6 km (0.3 nmi) long, lying 0.19 km (0.1 nmi) northwest of Boffa Island and half a kilometre east of Browning Peninsula in the south part of the Windmill Islands. It was first mapped from air photos taken by USN Operation Highjump and Operation Windmill in 1947 and 1948. Named by the US-ACAN for Paul Bosner, member of one of the two Operation Windmill photographic units which obtained aerial and ground photos of the area in January 1948.

== See also ==
- Composite Antarctic Gazetteer
- List of Antarctic and sub-Antarctic islands
- List of Antarctic islands south of 60° S
- SCAR
- Territorial claims in Antarctica
