= Moreland Nunatak =

Moreland Nunatak (81°15′S 87°5′W) is an isolated nunatak lying about 15 nautical miles (28 km) west of the Pirrit Hills in Antarctica. The feature was positioned from U.S. Navy aerial photography taken in 1961, and was named by the Advisory Committee on Antarctic Names for William B. Moreland, a meteorologist in the 1957 winter party at Little America V.
