= Cassandra Nunatak =

Nunatak in Palmer Archipelago, Antarctica

Cassandra Nunatak (64°27′S 63°24′W) is a nunatak, 425 metres (1,400 ft) high, marking the east side of the mouth of Iliad Glacier in northern Anvers Island, Palmer Archipelago. It was surveyed by the Falkland Islands Dependencies Survey in 1955–57, and mapped from photos taken by Hunting Aerosurveys Ltd in 1956–57. It was named by the UK Antarctic Place-Names Committee for Cassandra, Priam's daughter in Homer's Iliad.
