= New Zealand Geological Survey Antarctic Expedition =

Series of expeditions in 1950s and 1960s

The New Zealand Geological and Survey Antarctic Expedition (NZGSAE) describes a series of scientific explorations of the continent Antarctica. The expeditions were notably active throughout the 1950s and 1960s.

== Features named by the expeditions ==
=== 1957–1958 expedition ===
The 1957–1958 expedition went to the Ross Dependency and named the Borchgrevink Glacier. Other features named include:

- Carter Ridge
- Felsite Island
- Halfway Nunatak
- Hedgehog Island
- Moraine Ridge

=== 1958–1959 expedition ===
- Cadwalader Beach
- Cape Hodgson
- Carter Ridge
- Isolation Point
- Mountaineer Range
- Mount Aurora
- Mount Hayward
- Mount Henderson (White Island)
- Mount Bird.

=== 1960–1961 expedition ===
- Deverall Island
- Lonewolf Nunataks

=== 1961–1962 expedition ===
- Aurora Heights
- The Boil
- Ford Spur
- Graphite Peak
- Half Century Nunatak
- Half Dome Nunatak
- Hump Passage
- Last Cache Nunatak
- Lookout Dome
- Montgomerie Glacier
- Mount Fyfe
- Mount Macdonald
- Snowshoe Pass
- Turret Nunatak

=== 1962–1963 expedition ===
- Browning Pass (remapped and named; first mapped by the British Antarctic Expedition, 1910–13)
- Crash Nunatak

=== 1963–1964 expedition ===
- Austin Peak
- Banded Peak
- Bravo Hills
- Garden Spur
- Leap Year Glacier
- Lonely One Nunatak
- Mount Fairweather
- Mount Gawn
- Outrider Nunatak
- Sledgers Glacier
- The Tusk

=== 1964–1965 expedition ===
- Moody Nunatak
- Mount Gregory
- Mount Hayter
- Turbidite Hill

=== 1965–1966 expedition ===
- Hades Terrace

=== 1967–1968 expedition ===
- Champness Glacier
- Graduation Ridge
- Dow Peak
- Moawhango Névé
- Ian Peak

=== 1969–1970 expedition ===
- Bartlett Bench
- Marble Peak
- Roaring Ridge
- Surprise Spur

== See also ==
- New Zealand Antarctic Place-Names Committee
