= Cowie Nunatak =

Nunatak in Victoria Land, Antarctica

Coordinates: 77°8′S 160°22′E

Cowie Nunatak is a bold bluff-type nunatak, 1,782 metres (5,846 ft) high, with a cliffed east face, located 5 nautical miles (9 km) west of Detour Nunatak in the upper part of Mackay Glacier, Victoria Land. It was named after James Cowie of the Scott Base drilling project at Cape Roberts.
