= Barkell Platform =

Rock platform on the Mawson Escarpment, Antarctica

- Platform
- Location within Antarctica
- Coordinates: 72°40′S 68°16′E
- Location: Mac. Robertson Land, Antarctica
- Etymology: V.G. Barkell, helicopter pilot with the Australian National Antarctic Research Expeditions
- Elevation: 1,285 metres (4,220 ft)

Barkell Platform (72°40′S 68°16′E) is a narrow, level rock platform on the north end of Mawson Escarpment in Antarctica. This promontory, 1,285 metres (4,220 ft) high, was the site of a geodetic survey station during the Australian National Antarctic Research Expeditions Prince Charles Mountains survey in 1971. It was named for V.G. Barkell, helicopter pilot with the survey.
