= Pollux Nunatak =

Pollux Nunatak (65°5′S 59°53′W) is one of the Seal Nunataks, lying 2 nautical miles (3.7 km) northwest of Robertson Island in Larsen Ice Shelf. The probable existence of the feature was first reported by Falkland Islands Dependencies Survey (FIDS) in 1947 and its existence was confirmed during a FIDS survey in 1953. The United Kingdom Antarctic Place-Names Committee (UK-APC) name derives from its association with Castor Nunatak 4.5 nautical miles (8 km) to the SSW; Castor and Pollux were sons of Zeus.
