= Director Nunatak =

Nunatak in Graham Land, Antarctica

Director Nunatak (66°49′S 65°6′W) is a conspicuous nunatak standing between the heads of Balch Glacier and Breitfuss Glacier, in Graham Land in Antarctica. It was photographed by Hunting Aerosurveys Ltd in 1955–57, and mapped from these photos by the Falkland Islands Dependencies Survey (FIDS). It was so named by the UK Antarctic Place-Names Committee in 1958 because this nunatak was used as a landmark by a FIDS sledge party from Detaille Island in 1957 when traveling on Avery Plateau.
