= Perseus Crags =

Perseus Crags (70°36′S 66°11′W) is a group of about twelve small nunataks dominated by a high whale-backed hill, located on the west edge of the Dyer Plateau of Palmer Land, about 30 nautical miles (60 km) ENG. of Wade Point. Named by United Kingdom Antarctic Place-Names Committee (UK-APC) after the constellation of Perseus.
