= Mawson Escarpment =

Antarctic geological formation

Location of Mawson Escarpment, Mac. Robertson Land, Antarctica

Mawson Escarpment (73°5′S 68°10′E) is a flat-topped, west-facing escarpment which extends in a north–south direction for 110 km (70 mi) along the east side of Lambert Glacier in Antarctica. It was discovered by Flying Officer J. Seaton, Royal Australian Air Force, of the Australian National Antarctic Research Expeditions while on a reconnaissance flight in November 1956, and was named by the Antarctic Names Committee of Australia for Sir Douglas Mawson.

On the northern end is the Barkell Platform.
