= Erehwon Nunatak =

Erehwon Nunatak (74°31′S 76°41′W) is a small nunatak, 6 metres (20 ft) high and 15 metres (50 ft) long, at an elevation of 1,050 metres (3,440 ft), located 16 nautical miles (30 km) northwest of Henkle Peak in Ellsworth Land, Antarctica. It was discovered in January 1985 by chance in a snowstorm and fog by the joint United States Geological Survey – British Antarctic Survey geological party led by Peter D. Rowley. The name is "nowhere" spelled backwards and was suggested by Rowley because the field party was uncertain of its location during the foul weather.
