= Themis Nunatak =

Nunatak on Alexander Island, Antarctica

Themis Nunatak (71°37′S 69°6′W) is a very large, flat-topped nunatak lying 6 nautical miles (11 km) west-southwest of Mount Umbriel in the southern portion of Alexander Island, Antarctica. The nunatak was first mapped from trimetrogon air photography taken by Ronne Antarctic Research Expedition in 1947–48, and from survey by Falkland Islands Dependencies Survey in 1948–50. Named by United Kingdom Antarctic Place-Names Committee in association with nearby Saturn Glacier, Themis being one of the satellites of the planet Saturn, the sixth planet of the Solar System.

== See also ==
- Ceres Nunataks
- Enceladus Nunataks
- Pickering Nunataks
