= Cadwalader Beach =

Beach in the Ross Archipelago in Antarctica

Cadwalader Beach (76°58′S 166°53′E) is a beach nearly 1 mile (1.6 km) long at the south end of Beaufort Island, in the Ross Archipelago in McMurdo Sound in Antarctica.

The beach is occupied by a large Adélie penguin rookery and there is easy access from the sea when the coast is ice free.

It was named by the New Zealand Geological Survey Antarctic Expedition (1958–59) for Captain John Cadwalader, U.S. Navy, who encouraged and assisted the expedition in its Antarctic program, and also rendered assistance to the New Zealand parties of the Commonwealth Trans-Antarctic Expedition, 1956–1958.
