= Trioen Nunataks =

Coordinates: 72°25′S 3°59′W

Trioen Nunataks () is an isolated group of three nunataks about 8 miles (13 km) northwest of Borg Mountain in Queen Maud Land. Mapped by Norwegian cartographers from surveys and air photos by the Norwegian-British-Swedish Antarctic Expedition (NBSAE) (1949–1952), led by John Schjelderup Giæver and named Trioen (the trio).
