= Half Dome Nunatak =

Nunatak in Ross Dependency, Antarctica

Half Dome Nunatak (82°27′S 159°14′E) is a nunatak lying 2 nautical miles (4 km) south of the Cobham Range in Antarctica, at the mouth of Lucy Glacier. It was so named by the northern party of the New Zealand Geological Survey Antarctic Expedition (1961–62) because it is rounded on one side and cut into sheer cliffs on the other side.
