= Turret Nunatak =

Turret Nunatak (82°25′S 158°0′E) is an elongated nunatak, 1,960 m, standing west of Cobham Range in the lower portion of Lucy Glacier. Mapped by the northern party of the New Zealand Geological Survey Antarctic Expedition (NZGSAE) (1961–62) and so named because of the turreted cliffs on its southern side.
