= Florence Nunatak =

Florence Nunatak (62°13′07″S 58°36′03″W) is a conspicuous nunatak, 280 metres (920 ft) high, nearly 2 nautical miles (3.7 km) east of the head of Potter Cove in the southwest part of King George Island, South Shetland Islands. It was named by the UK Antarctic Place-Names Committee in 1960 for the sealing vessel which visited the South Shetland Islands in 1876–77 during the revival of United States southern fur sealing. Some of the crew of the Florence wintered at Potter Cove during 1877; only one survived.
