= Burch Peaks =

Enderby Land peaks named for geophysicist W.M. Burch

The Burch Peaks (66°52′S 53°2′E) are a group of peaks 6 nautical miles (11 km) east of Mount Torckler in Enderby Land. They were plotted from air photos taken from Australian National Antarctic Research Expeditions aircraft in 1957, and named by the Antarctic Names Committee of Australia for W.M. Burch, a geophysicist at Wilkes Station in 1961.
