= Gould Nunataks =

Nunataks in Enderby Land, Antarctica

The Gould Nunataks (66°30′S 51°42′E) are a small group of nunataks about 18 nautical miles (33 km) southeast of Mount Biscoe in Enderby Land, Antarctica. They were discovered in January 1930 by the British Australian and New Zealand Antarctic Research Expedition under Mawson, who named them "Gould Nunatak" in the singular, after Lieutenant Commander R.T. Gould, Royal Navy, of the Hydrographic Department of the Admiralty, who worked on the British Admiralty South Polar Chart. They were plotted as a group by Australian National Antarctic Research Expeditions from air photos in 1964, and so renamed in the plural.
