= Peterson Glacier =

Glacier in Antarctica

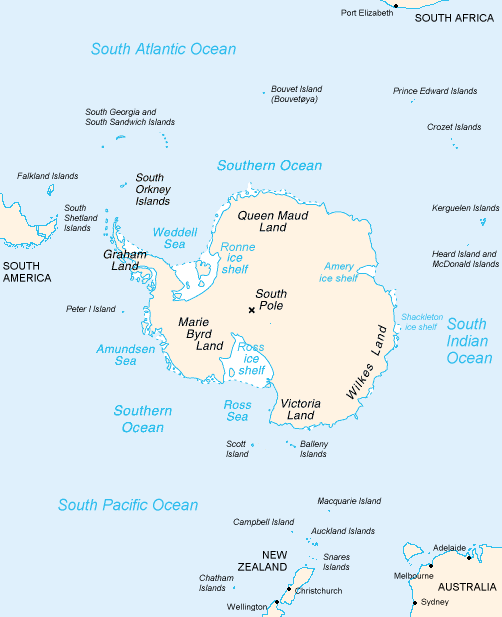
- Map of Antarctica, with Wilkes Land slightly to the right

- Location within Antarctica
- Location: Wilkes Land
- Coordinates: 66°25′00″S 110°44′00″E
- Thickness: unknown
- Terminus: Penney Bay
- Status: unknown

Peterson Glacier is a glacier flowing west into Penney Bay opposite Herring Island in the Windmill Islands. Mapped from aerial photographs taken by U.S. Navy (USN) OpHjp, 1946–47, and named for Louie N. Peterson, radio operator and recorder with the U.S. Navy (USN) OpWml parties which established astronomical control stations along Wilhelm II, Knox and Budd Coasts during January–February 1948.

== See also ==
- List of glaciers in the Antarctic
- Glaciology
