= Mount Underwood =

(Australian National Antarctic Research Expeditions

Mount Underwood (68°8′S 49°21′E) is an elongated mountain 2 nautical miles (3.7 km) east of Mount Flett in the central Nye Mountains. It was plotted from air photos taken from ANARE (Australian National Antarctic Research Expeditions) aircraft in 1956 and 1957 and was named by the ANC for R. Underwood, a geophysicist at Wilkes Station in 1959.
