= Galtefjellet =

Rock formation in Antarctica

Galtefjellet (68°16′S 58°35′E) is the southeastern of two rock outliers on the south side of Purka Mountain in the Hansen Mountains of Antarctica. It was mapped and named Galtefjellet (boar mountain) by Norwegian cartographers working from air photos taken by the Lars Christensen Expedition, 1936–1937.
