= Exile Nunatak =

Nunatak on Alexander Island, Antarctica

Exile Nunatak (70°19′S 71°16′W) is an isolated nunatak in the northwest part of Handel Ice Piedmont in the west-central part of Alexander Island, Antarctica. It was first mapped from air photos obtained by the Ronne Antarctic Research Expedition, 1947–48, by D. Searle of the Falkland Islands Dependencies Survey in 1960. The name given by the UK Antarctic Place-Names Committee suggests the feature's isolated position.

== See also ==
- Figaro Nunatak
- Hesperus Nunatak
- Knott Nunatak
