= Omega Nunatak =

Nunatak in Coats Land, Antarctica

Omega Nunatak (81°55′S 29°12′W) is an isolated, flat-topped nunatak 21 nautical miles (39 km) south-southwest of the Whichaway Nunataks, Coats Land, Antarctica. First mapped in 1957–58 by the Commonwealth Trans-Antarctic Expedition and so named because it was the last rock outcrop seen, until Victoria Land was reached, on the transpolar route of the Commonwealth Trans-Antarctic Expedition in 1957–58.
