= Table Nunatak =

Nunatak in Palmer Land, Antarctica

Table Nunatak (68°30′S 62°57′W) is a flat-topped, rectangular nunatak lying 0.5 nautical miles (0.9 km) east of Cape Agassiz on the east coast of Palmer Land. This is probably the feature first seen in 1940 by members of the United States Antarctic Service (USAS) and described as a snow-covered island close east of Cape Agassiz. The nunatak was again sighted by Lieutenant Charles J. Adams, of the then United States Army Air Forces (USAAF), pilot with the Ronne Antarctic Research Expedition (RARE) on a flight in September 1947. The name is descriptive.
