= Gowlett Peaks =

Mountains in Antarctica

The Gowlett Peaks (69°53′S 64°55′E) are a small group of isolated peaks, consisting of tall, sharp twin peaks and two close outliers, about 8 nautical miles (15 km) northeast of the Anare Nunataks in Mac. Robertson Land, Antarctica. They were sighted in November 1955 by an Australian National Antarctic Research Expeditions party led by John Béchervaise, and were named by the Antarctic Names Committee of Australia for Alan Gowlett, an engineer at Mawson Station in 1955.
