= Arena Corner =

Mountain in the antarctica

Geography
- Location: Antarctic Treaty area
- Parent range: Traverse Mountains

Arena Corner (69°51′S 68°2′W) is an arcuate (curved) nunatak at the north end of the Traverse Mountains, 2 nautical miles (4 km) east of McHugo Peak, on the Rymill Coast, Palmer Land. It was named in 1977 by the UK Antarctic Place-Names Committee, the name being descriptive of the shape of this feature, which serves as a landmark in the area.
