= Mount Gawn =

Mountain in Ross Dependency, Antarctica

Mount Gawn (71°55′S 165°11′E) is a prominent peak, 2,190 metres (7,190 ft) high, in the central part of the King Range in northwestern Victoria Land, Antarctica. The topographical feature was so named by the northern party of the New Zealand Geological Survey Antarctic Expedition, 1963–64, for J.E. Gawn, a radio operator at Scott Base, 1963–64, who maintained radio schedules with the party. The mountain lies situated on the Pennell Coast, a portion of Antarctica lying between Cape Williams and Cape Adare.
