= Haigh Nunatak =

Haigh Nunatak (Antarctic Gazetter 71°16′S 71°27′E)* is a low peak 12 nautical miles (22 km) northeast of Pickering Nunatak on the east side of the mouth of Lambert Glacier in Antarctica. It was photographed from Australian National Antarctic Research Expeditions aircraft in 1957, and was visited by a geological party of the Soviet Antarctic Expedition in January 1966. It was named by the Antarctic Names Committee of Australia for John Haigh, a geophysicist at Mawson Station in 1965, who accompanied the Soviet party.
