= Goldenberg Ridge =

Goldenberg Ridge (66°28′S 110°35′E) is a linear rocky eminence, 0.8 nautical miles (1.5 km) long, which extends in a northwest–southeast direction along the east side of Browning Peninsula, at the south end of the Windmill Islands, Antarctica. It was first mapped from air photos taken by U.S. Navy Operation Highjump and Operation Windmill in 1947 and 1948, and was named by the Advisory Committee on Antarctic Names for Burton D. Goldenberg, a meteorologist and member of the Wilkes Station party of 1962.
