= Deverall Island =

Southernmost island off Beaumont Bay

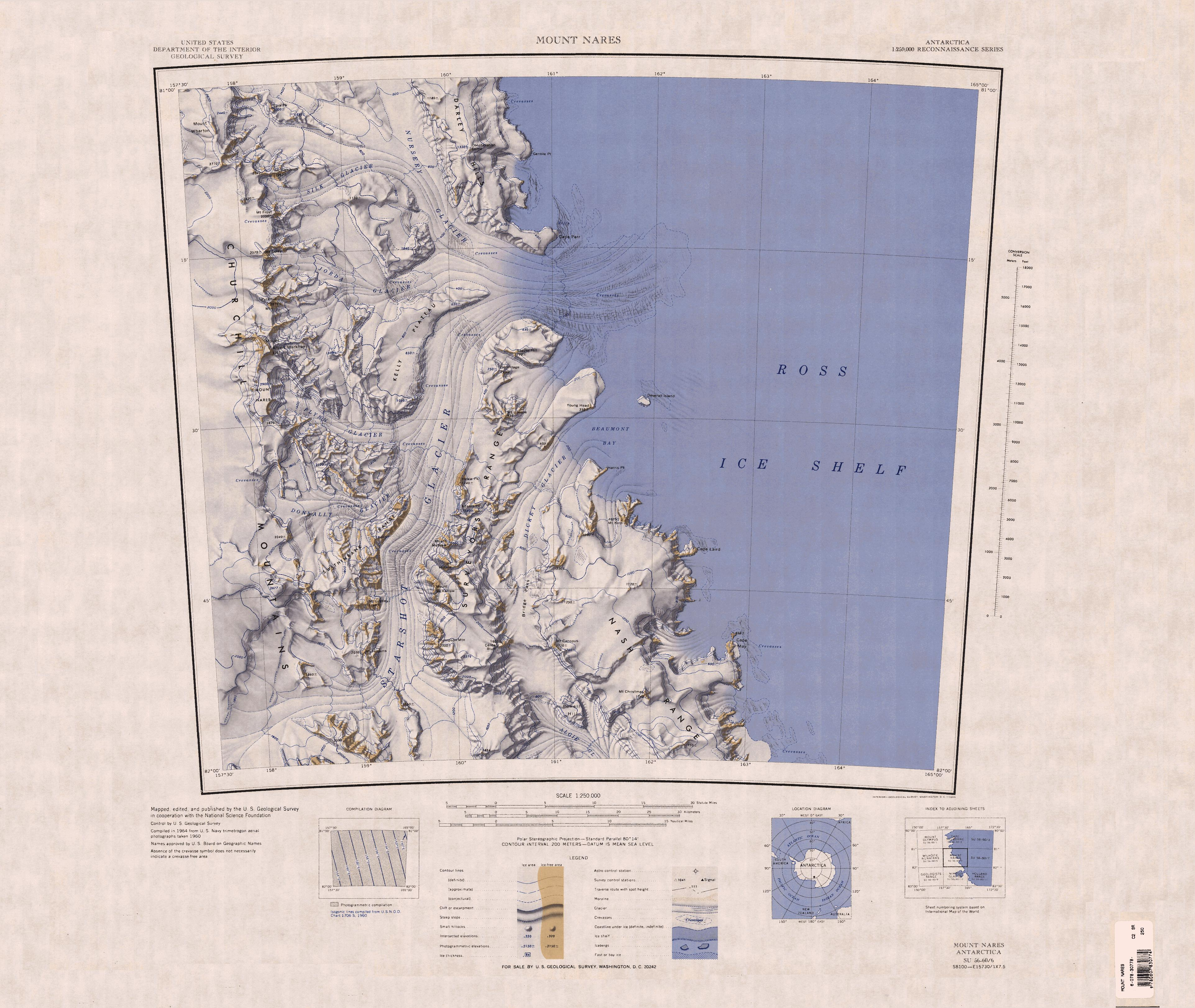
Map sheet showing Deverall Island

Deverall Island (81°28′S 161°54′E) is a small ice-covered island, rising above the Ross Ice Shelf just northeast of Beaumont Bay. It was named by the New Zealand Geological Survey Antarctic Expedition (1960–61) for William H. Deverall, a radio operator at Scott Base, 1961. It is considered to be the southernmost island in the world.

== See also ==
- List of antarctic and sub-antarctic islands
