= Castor Nunatak =

Nunatak in Graham Land, Antarctica

- Location within Antarctica

Naming
- Etymology: Morten Pedersen's sealing and exploration ship, Castor

Geography
- Continent: Antarctica
- Area: Graham Land
- Range coordinates: 65°10′S 59°55′W

Climbing
- First ascent: Swedish Antarctic Expedition (1902)

Castor Nunatak (65°10′S 59°55′W) is a nunatak 3 nautical miles (6 km) southwest of Oceana Nunatak in the Seal Nunataks group, off the east coast of the Antarctic Peninsula. It was first seen and mapped as an island in December 1893 by a Norwegian Sealing expedition under C.A. Larsen, who named it after the Castor, a ship which combined sealing and exploring activities along the west coast of the Antarctic Peninsula under Captain Morten Pedersen in 1893–94. The feature was determined to be a nunatak in 1902 by the Swedish Antarctic Expedition under Otto Nordenskiöld.

== Geological characteristics ==
Castor Nunatak is primarily composed of volcanic and metamorphic rocks typical of the northern Antarctic Peninsula region. Geological surveys conducted by the British Antarctic Survey (BAS) and the Instituto Antártico Argentino indicate that the nunatak is part of the Mesozoic–Cenozoic volcanic arc system that extends along the eastern coast of the Antarctic Peninsula. The rock formations consist mainly of basaltic and andesitic lavas interbedded with pyroclastic deposits, suggesting a complex volcanic origin associated with subduction processes along the former Phoenix Plate margin.

The exposed ridges of Castor Nunatak rise abruptly above the surrounding Larsen Ice Shelf, providing an important reference point for glaciological and geological mapping. Because of its relative accessibility and clear exposure, it has been used as a fixed observation site in satellite based ice motion studies and in climate monitoring programs during the late 20th and early 21st centuries.
