= Vorta Nunatak =

Vorta Nunatak (72°5′S 1°44′E) is an isolated nunatak about 5 nautical miles (9 km) east of Brattskarvet Mountain, in the Sverdrup Mountains, Queen Maud Land. Photographed from the air by the German Antarctic Expedition (1938–39). Mapped by Norwegian cartographers from surveys and air photos by Norwegian-British-Swedish Antarctic Expedition (NBSAE) (1949–52) and air photos by the Norwegian expedition (1958–59) and named Vorta (the wart).
