= Landon Promontory =

Promontory on Antarctica

Landon Promontory (69°13′S 69°20′E) is a broad, domed ice-covered promontory on the west side of the Amery Ice Shelf, Antarctica, about 5 nautical miles (9 km) south of Foley Promontory, across Doggers Bay. It was plotted from Australian National Antarctic Research Expeditions (ANARE) air photos taken in 1956, and the area was first visited by an ANARE party led by D.R. Carstens in November 1962. The promontory was named by the Antarctic Names Committee of Australia after I. Landon-Smith, a glaciologist at Mawson Station in 1962, and a member of the field party.
