= Esther Nunatak =

Esther Nunatak (61°57′S 57°50′W) is a nunatak lying 2 nautical miles (4 km) southwest of Brimstone Peak in the northeast part of King George Island, in the South Shetland Islands. It was charted and named by Discovery Investigations personnel on the Discovery II in 1937, probably from association with nearby Esther Harbour.
