= Dingle Dome (Antarctica) =

Ice-covered dome in Antarctica

Coordinates: 67°3′S 48°54′E

Dingle Dome is an ice-covered dome rising above 400 metres (1,300 ft) and surmounting the north end of Sakellari Peninsula, on the coast of Enderby Land in Antarctica. It was discovered in 1956 during flights by Australian National Antarctic Research Expeditions aircraft, and named by the Antarctic Names Committee of Australia for Robert Dingle, officer in charge at Davis Station in 1957.
