= Last Cache Nunatak =

Nunatak in Ross Dependency, Antarctica

Last Cache Nunatak (85°33′S 174°8′W) is the southernmost and last nunatak on the ridge forming the eastern wall of Zaneveld Glacier. Though not large, it is an important navigational landmark on the polar plateau in the vicinity of the head of Shackleton Glacier. It was so named by the southern party of the New Zealand Geological Survey Antarctic Expedition (1961–62), who made their last depot of food and fuel near the nunatak.
