= Mount Smethurst =

Mountain in the Antarctic

Mount Smethurst (66°50′S 52°36′E) is a prominent mountain 3 nautical miles (6 km) northwest of Mount Torckler and 29 nautical miles (50 km) southwest of Stor Hanakken Mountain in Enderby Land, Antarctica. It was plotted from air photos taken by ANARE (Australian National Antarctic Research Expeditions) aircraft in 1957 and was named by the Antarctic Names Committee of Australia (ANCA) for N.R. Smethurst, the officer-in-charge at Wilkes Station in 1961.

== See also ==
- Church Nunataks, located 1 nautical mile (2 km) northeast of Mount Smethurst
- Mount McGhee, located 4 nautical miles (7.4 km) south of Mount Smethurst
