= Mount Torckler =

Mountain in Enderby Land, Antarctica

Mount Torckler (66°52′S 52°44′E) is a mountain 3 nautical miles (6 km) southeast of Mount Smethurst and 28 nautical miles (50 km) southwest of Stor Hanakken Mountain in Enderby Land. It was plotted from air photos taken from ANARE (Australian National Antarctic Research Expeditions) aircraft in 1957 and was named by the Antarctic Names Committee of Australia (ANCA) for R.M. Torckler, a radio officer at Wilkes Station in 1961.

== See also ==
- Mount Paish
