= Whitmer Peninsula =

Peninsula in Antarctica

- Location within Antarctica

Highest point
- Coordinates: 75°50′S 162°45′E

Geography
- Location: Victoria Land, Antarctica

The Whitmer Peninsula (75°50′S 162°45′E) is a broad ice-capped peninsula, about 7 nautical miles (13 km; 8.1 mi) long and wide, between Cheetham Ice Tongue and Harbord Glacier Tongue on the coast of Victoria Land, Antarctica.

== Location ==
The Whitmer Peninsula is on the west coast of the Ross Sea. Kohler Head is on its northeast coast. It is south of the Cheetham Ice Tongue and Lamplugh Island, east of the Davis Glacier and north of the Harbord Glacier, which flows between Starr Nunatak and Varney Nunatak into the sea, where it forms the Harbord Glacier Tongue.

== Exploration and naming ==
The Whitmer Peninsula was mapped by United States Geological Survey (USGS) from surveys and United States Navy air photos, 1957–62. It was named by the United States Advisory Committee on Antarctic Names (US-ACAN) for Lieutenant (j.g.) R.D. Whitmer, U.S. Navy, who wintered over at Williams Field, McMurdo Sound, in 1956. He returned to Antarctica with United States Naval Construction Battalion units during Deep Freeze 1966 and 1967.

== Features ==
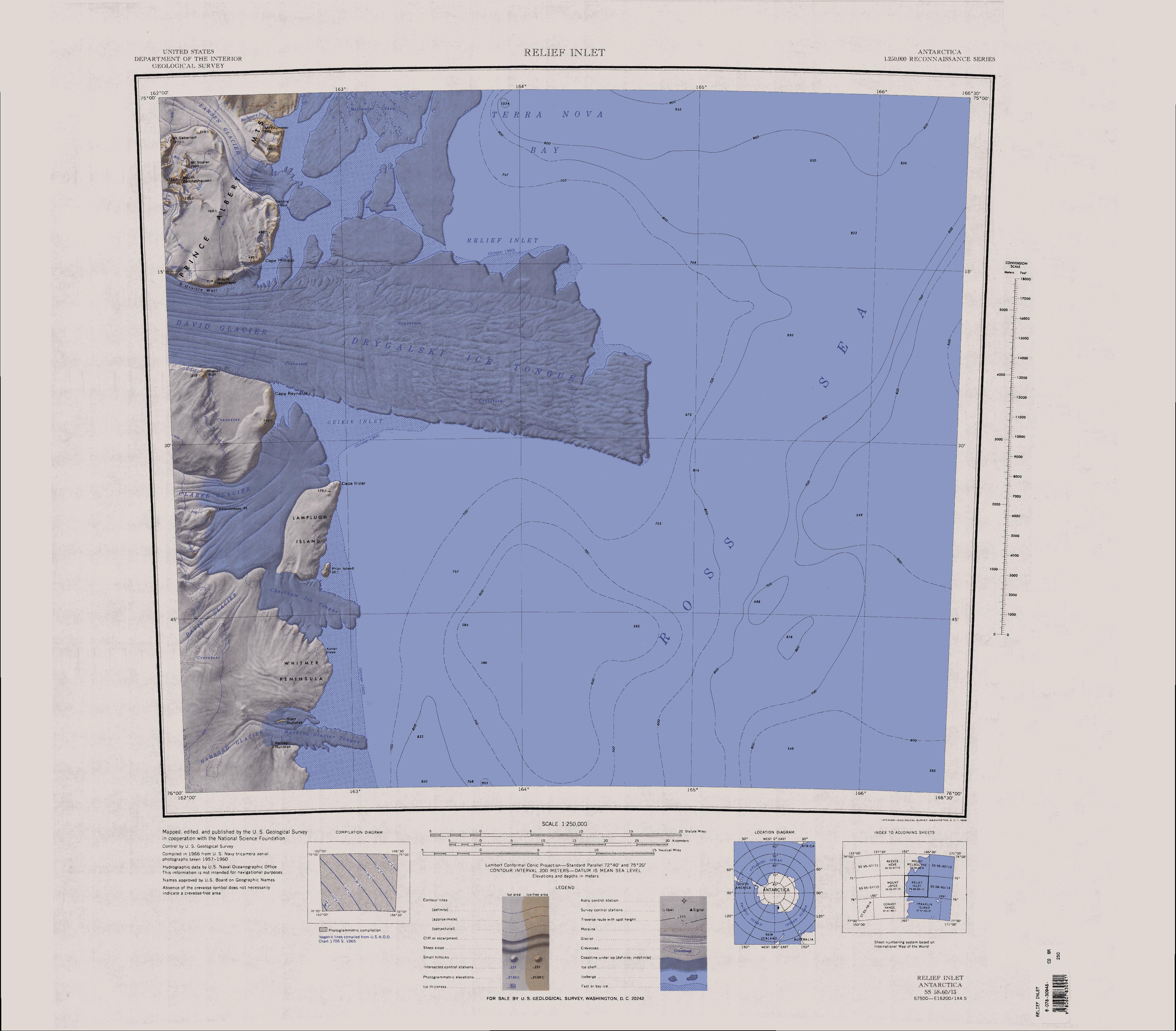
Whitmer peninsula in south west of map

Features of the peninsula and nearby terrain include:

=== Kohler Head ===
75°48′S 162°51′E. A small headland on the northeast side of Whitmer Peninsula. Mapped by the United States Geological Survey (USGS) from surveys and United States Navy air photos, 1957–62. Named by the United States Advisory Committee on Antarctic Names (US-ACAN) for John L. Kohler, United States Navy, construction electrician at McMurdo Station, 1965-66 and 1966-67.

=== Harbord Glacier ===
75°55′S 162°24′E. A glacier flowing along the south side of Mount George Murray. It enters the Ross Sea south of Whitmer Peninsula where it forms Harbord Glacier Tongue. The name derives from the glacier tongue, which was named by Ernest Shackleton for A.E. Harbord, second officer of the Nimrod during the last year of the British Antarctic Expedition, 1907-09.

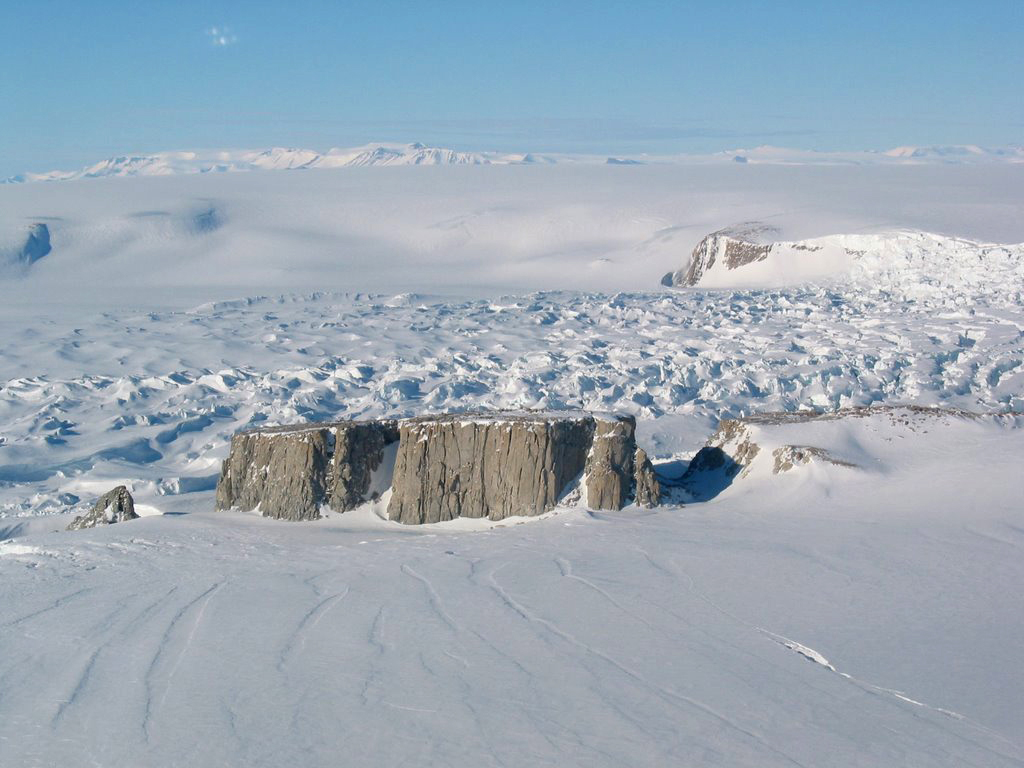
North face of Starr Nunatak, on the north side of the mouth of Harbord Glacier.

=== Starr Nunatak ===
75°54′S 162°35′E. A conspicuous nunatak marking the north side of the mouth of Harbord Glacier. Mapped by the USGS from surveys and United States Navy air photos, 1957-62. Named by US-ACAN for James W. Starr, United States Navy, steelworker at McMurdo Station, 1966 and 1967 summer seasons.

=== Varney Nunatak ===
75°56′S 162°31′E. An ice-free nunatak at the south side of the mouth of Harbord Glacier. Mapped by the USGS from surveys and United States Navy air photos, 1957-62. Named by US-ACAN for Kenneth L. Varney, United States Navy, Equipment Operator at McMurdo Station during the 1965-66 and 1966-67 summer seasons.

=== Harbord Glacier Tongue ===
75°55′S 162°50′E. A glacier tongue forming the seaward extension of Harbord Glacier on the coast of Victoria Land. First charted by the British Antarctic Expedition under Shackleton, 1907-09, at which time it extended about 5 nautical miles (9.3 km; 5.8 mi) into the Ross Sea. Named by Shackleton for A.E. Harbord, second officer of the Nimrod for the last year of the expedition.

== Sources ==
- Alberts, Fred G., ed. (1995), Geographic Names of the Antarctic (PDF) (2 ed.), United States Board on Geographic Names This article incorporates public domain material from websites or documents of the United States Board on Geographic Names.
- Relief Inlet, USGS: United States Geological Survey

This article incorporates public domain material from websites or documents of the United States Geological Survey.
