= Eyres Bay =

Bay in Antarctica

Coordinates: 66°29′S 110°28′E

Eyres Bay is a bay lying between the west side of Browning Peninsula and the front of Vanderford Glacier at the southern end of the Windmill Islands in Antarctica. It was first mapped from air photos taken by U.S. Navy Operation Highjump and Operation Windmill in 1947 and 1948, and was named by the Advisory Committee on Antarctic Names for Ensign David L. Eyres, U.S. Navy, a member of the Wilkes Station party of 1958.
