= Hopalong Nunatak =

Nunatak in Coats Land, Antarctica

Hopalong Nunatak (81°33′S 28°45′W) is the westernmost and highest of the Whichaway Nunataks in Antarctica. It was first mapped in 1957 by the Commonwealth Trans-Antarctic Expedition and so named to mark the work in this area of the Australian geologist of the expedition in 1956–58.
