= Mount Cordwell =

Mountain in Enderby Land, Antarctica

Mount Cordwell (66°52′S 53°9′E) is a mountain 2 nautical miles (4 km) east of the Burch Peaks and 21 nautical miles (39 km) south-southwest of Stor Hanakken Mountain in Enderby Land. It was plotted from air photos taken from Australian National Antarctic Research Expeditions aircraft in 1957, and was named by the Antarctic Names Committee of Australia for T.S. Cordwell, a radio officer at Wilkes Station in 1961.

== See also ==
- Mount Jewell, mountain 3 nautical miles (6 km) south of Mount Cordwell
