= Mount Oydeholmen =

Mountain in Antarctica

Mount Oydeholmen, also Mount Kernot (67°24′S 55°41′E) is a mostly ice-covered mountain standing 4 nautical miles (7 km) west of Rayner Peak, southward of Edward VIII Bay in Enderby Land. It was mapped by Norwegian cartographers from air photos taken by the Lars Christensen Expedition of 1936–37 and was named Oydeholmen (the desolate islet). The name means "the desolate island" in Norwegian.
