= Iain Denholm =

Scottish footballer

Personal information
- Full name: Iain Denholm
- Date of birth: 14 February 1948 (age 78)
- Place of birth: Provan, Scotland
- Position: Forward

Youth career
- Strathclyde University

Senior career*
| Years | Team | Apps | (Gls) |
| 1970–1972 | Queen's Park | 27 | (14) |

International career
| 1972 | Scotland Amateurs | 3 | (0) |
- * Club domestic league appearances and goals

Iain Denholm (born 14 February 1948) was a Scottish amateur football forward who played in the Scottish League for Queen's Park. He was capped by Scotland at amateur level.
