= Mount Henry (Alberta) =

Mountain in Alberta, Canada

Coordinates: 52.9467°N 118.2527°W

Mount Henry is a summit in Alberta, Canada.

Mount Henry is named after William Henry, an early North West Company fur trader.
