= Art Pauley =

American historian (1905–1984)

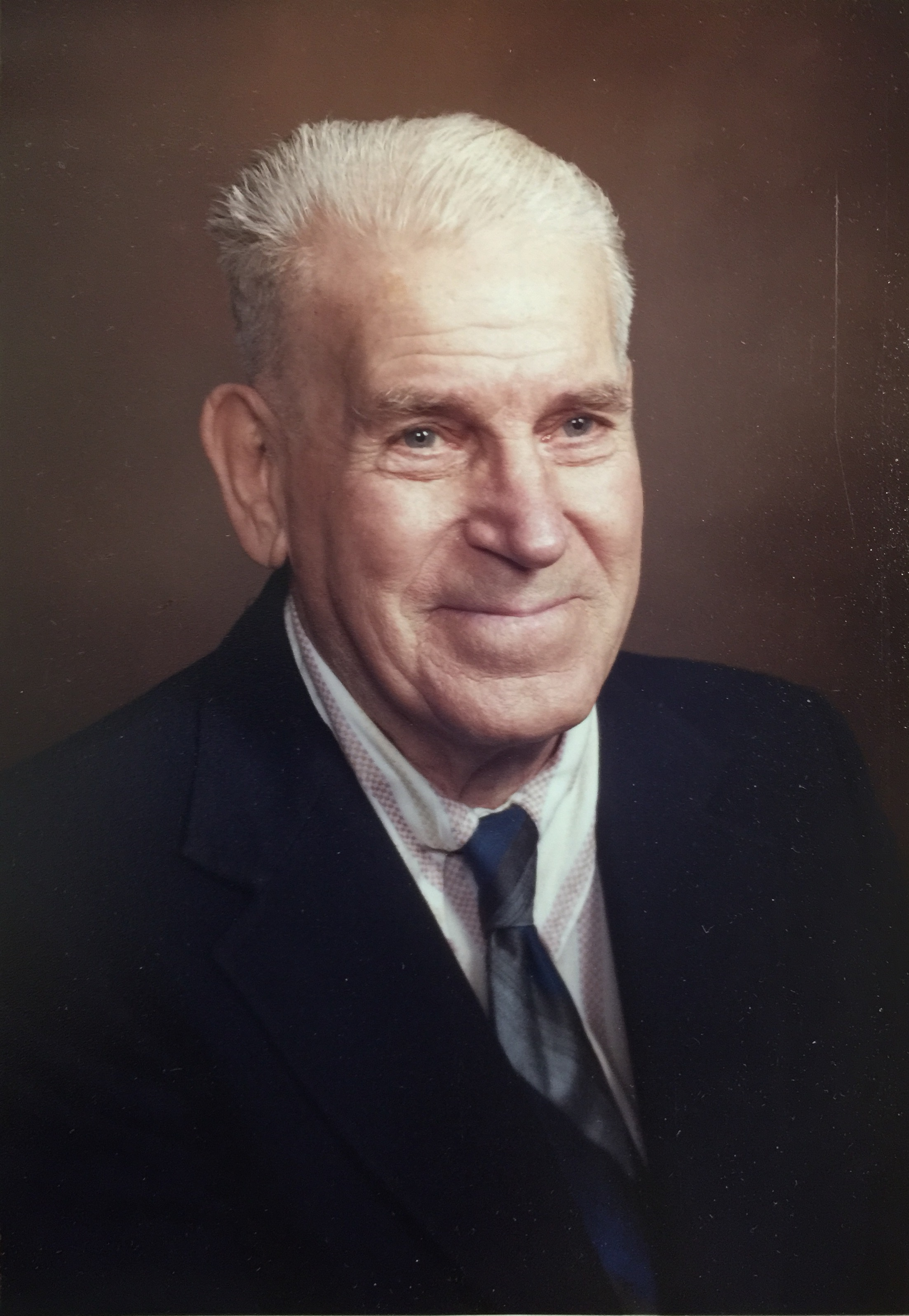
- Art Pauley
- Born: Arthur Pauley; December 2, 1905; Maine, U.S.
- Died: August 1, 1984 (aged 78)
- Spouse: Oneta Pauley
- Children: 2

Arthur Pauley (December 2, 1905 – August 1, 1984) was an American historian and writer. He wrote the book Henry Plummer, Lawman and Outlaw, published in 1980 by the Meagher County News, White Sulphur Springs, Montana. He published the first biography of Henry Plummer, an old west lawman and criminal. Pauley's interest in Plummer began when he was very young listening to the old-timers taking about the subject while living in Deer Lodge, Montana. He conducted research for many years before his book was published, visiting several places of interest associated with Plummer such as Nevada City, California and Bannack, Montana and central Idaho. Pauley was an amateur historian described by his editor, Verle L. Rademacher of the Meagher County News, as driving around with great reams of paper files stacked in heaps in the back seat of his car.

== Personal life ==
Pauley was born on December 2, 1905, in Maine. He married Oneta McClellan and had two children; one son Robert and one daughter Vivian. He was a resident of Vancouver, Washington, for majority of his life from 1935 until his death in 1984.

== Selected works ==
- Pauley, Art (1980), Henry Plummer, Lawman & Outlaw, (A biography of Henry Plummer), Meagher County News, White Sulphur Springs, Montana
