= Pawley Nunataks =

Nunatak group in Palmer Land, Antarctica

Coordinates: 69°59′S 67°36′W

Pawley Nunataks is a line of four nunataks on the east side of Mount Allan, Traverse Mountains, on the Rymill Coast, Palmer Land. Named by United Kingdom Antarctic Place-Names Committee (UK-APC) in 1977 after Michael R. Pawley, British Antarctic Survey (BAS) general assistant, 1969–71, and Station Leader, Stonington Island, 1972–73.
