= Nikki Denholm =

New Zealand humanitarian and photographer

Nikki Denholm MNZM
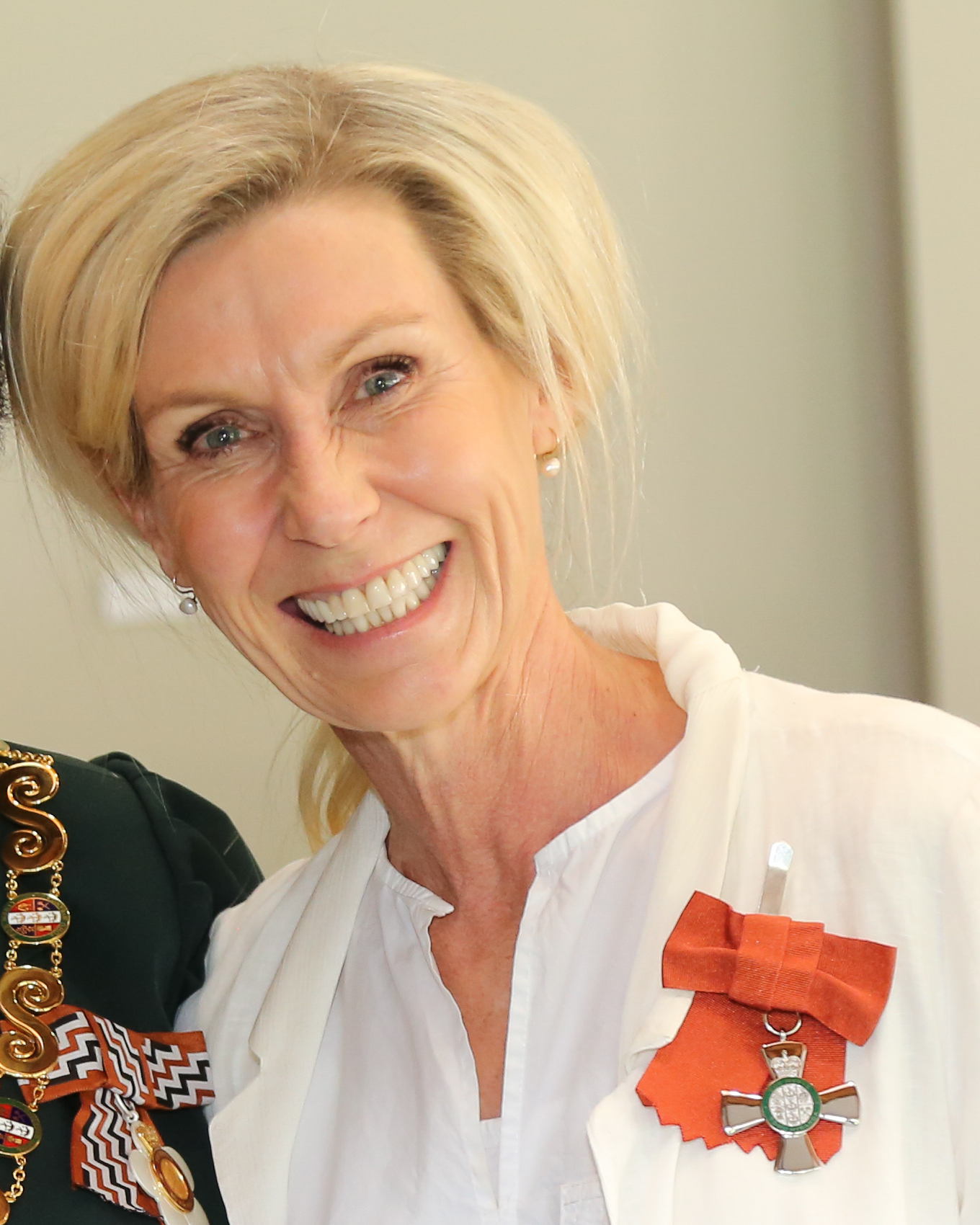
- Awards: Member of the New Zealand Order of Merit

Nicola Jane Denholm MNZM is a New Zealand photographer and sexual safety advocate. She has worked internationally to highlight social issues such as child imprisonment, sexual slavery, maternal health, and the global refugee crisis. She successfully lobbied for legislative change on female genital mutilation in New Zealand. In 2021 Denholm was appointed a Member of the New Zealand Order of Merit for services to humanitarian advocacy and photography.

== Career ==
Denholm originally worked as a sexual health nurse. As a photographer and charity ambassador, she has worked internationally to highlight social issues such as child imprisonment, sexual slavery, maternal health, and the global refugee crisis.

A symposium in India in 2015 alerted Denholm to the issue of sexual slavery, and she subsequently founded the National New Zealand FGM (Female Genital Mutilation) Education programme. She was appointed as an advisor to the World Health Organisation on FGM. Denholm lobbied for legislative change in New Zealand, and the bill to ban FGM in New Zealand was passed in 2018. The bill was historic as it was the first to pass with multiple sponsors from multiple parties, being supported by Jenny Marcroft (New Zealand First), Priyanca Radhakrishnan (Labour), Golriz Ghahraman (Greens) and Jo Hayes (National). Denholm wrote the national guidelines for professionals on responding to FGM.

Denholm also founded the National New Zealand African HIV/AIDS Programme. She is an ambassador for the charity TearFund, and has worked with Petra Bagust to highlight trafficking and slavery across Asia. Denholm has worked internationally in prisons, producing a photographic book of inmates in seventeen countries, and raised money for Somali hospitals during the 2010 famine. Denholm co-founded The Light Project, with Jo Robertson, Lief Pearson, Melissa Powell and Veronia Houghton. The Light Project aims to help families and children deal with pornography.

== Honours and awards ==
In 2005 Denholm was awarded the Zonta Woman of the Biennium Award by Zonta New Zealand. In the 2021 Queen's Birthday Honours Denholm was appointed a Member of the New Zealand Order of Merit for services to humanitarian advocacy and photography.

== Selected publications ==
- Heather Worth; Nikki Denholm; Johanna Bannister (1 August 2003). "HIV/AIDS and the African Refugee Education Program in New Zealand". AIDS Education and Prevention. 15 (4): 346–356. doi:10.1521/AEAP.15.5.346.23819. ISSN 0899-9546. PMID 14516019. Wikidata Q43661013.
- Fabienne Richard; Wisal Ahmed; Nikki Denholm; et al. (15 September 2017). "Female Genital Mutilation/Cutting: sharing data and experiences to accelerate eradication and improve care: part 2: Geneva, Switzerland. March 13-14, 2017". Reproductive Health. 14 (Suppl 2). doi:10.1186/S12978-017-0362-X. ISSN 1742-4755. PMC 5607483. Wikidata Q47161607.
- Denholm, Nikki (2004). Female Genital Mutilation in New Zealand: Understanding and Responding: a Guide for Health and Child Protection Professionals. Refugee Health Education Programme. p. 116.
- Denholm, Nikki (1999). Freedom: Prison Fellowship International's 20th Anniversary Souvenir Edition. Exposure International, Ltd. ISBN 9780473061258.
