= Alexander Brash =

British bookseller, stationer, and publisher

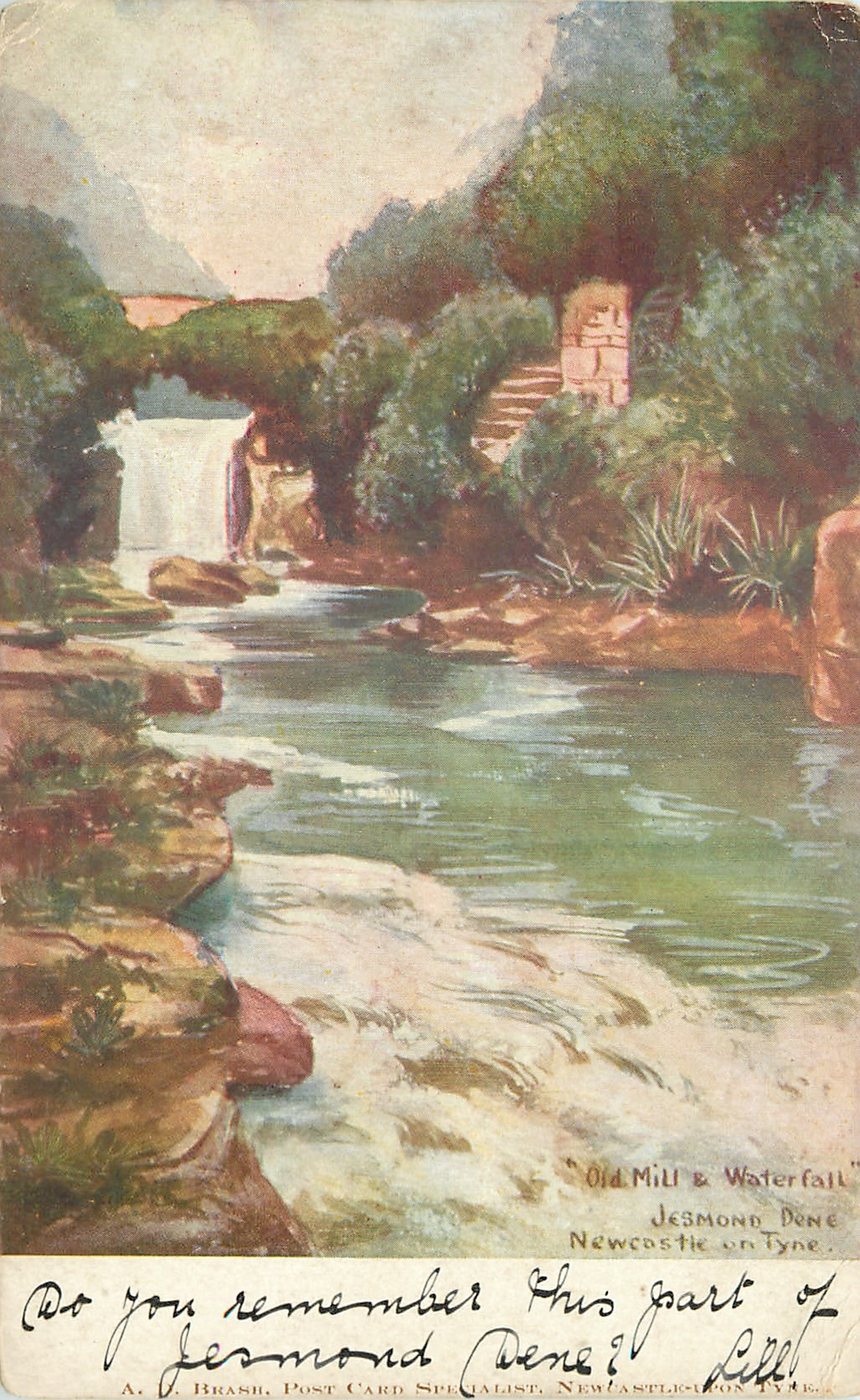
Old Mill & Waterfall, Jesmond Dene, Newcastle, an A.D. Brash post card

Alexander Denholm Brash (1874–1943) was a British bookseller, stationer and postcard publisher.

== Early life ==
Alexander Denholm Brash was born in Nottingham in 1874, the son of John Dudon Brash of Edinburgh, a Wesleyan minister, and his wife Mary Jane Brash, born in Manchester.

In 1898 and 1899, he was living at 241 Elgin Avenue, in the Paddington area of London.

== Career ==
In 1902, Henry Dryden Crowe, a stationer in his 50s, took on Brash, then aged 27 as a business partner in his shop at 92 Heaton Road, Newcastle upon Tyne. By 1905, Brash was in sole charge of what he would variously call a bookshop, stationers and circulating library. Brash also later ran an "artistic stationers" in the County Hotel Buildings opposite Newcastle railway station. He published postcards of the Newcastle area as well as some of Yorkshire.

By 1911, Brash was a librarian, living in Paddington, London and working for Boots.

== Personal life ==
Brash married Enid Armstrong, granddaughter of the Great Western Railway locomotive engineer, Joseph Armstrong, and they emigrated to Cape Town, but later returned to England, where they raised a family.

Brash died in Llandudno, Wales in 1943.
