= Pauly, Ivory Coast =

Pauly Pauli; Poli
- Village
- Location in Ivory Coast
- Coordinates: 4°54′N 6°11′W
- Country: Ivory Coast
- District: Bas-Sassandra
- Region: Gbôklé
- Department: Sassandra
- Sub-prefecture: Sassandra
- Time zone: UTC+0 (GMT)

Pauly (also spelled Pauli and Poli) is a coastal village in southwestern Ivory Coast. It is in the sub-prefecture of Sassandra, Sassandra Department, Gbôklé Region, Bas-Sassandra District. Pauly is sometimes subdivided into the villages of Pauly Brousse, which is half a kilometre inland, and Pauly Plage, which is on the seashore.

Pauly was a commune until March 2012, when it became one of 1,126 communes nationwide that were abolished.
