= Oceana Nunatak =

Nunatak in Graham Land, Antarctica

- Location within Antarctica

Naming
- Etymology: Oceana Co., who sponsored the discovery expedition

Geography
- Continent: Antarctica
- Area: Graham Land
- Range coordinates: 65°8′S 59°48′W

Oceana Nunatak (65°8′S 59°48′W) is one of the Seal Nunataks, lying at the northwest corner of Robertson Island, off the east coast of Antarctic Peninsula. Discovered by a Norwegian whaling expedition under C.A. Larsen in December 1893, and named after the Oceana Co. of Hamburg, a sponsor of the expedition.
