= Svart Peak =

Mountain in Antarctica

Svart Peak (67°16′S 58°28′E) is a rock peak, 210 metres (690 ft) high, lying a short distance inland from the coast on the southwest side of Law Promontory in Antarctica. It was mapped by Norwegian cartographers from aerial photographs taken by the Lars Christensen Expedition in January–February 1937, and named Svartfjell (Norwegian for black mountain} because of its black appearance.
