= Cordwell (surname) =

Cordwell is an English surname which is derived from Cordwell in Derbyshire. The earliest record of it is in the Derbyshire subsidy rolls of 1327 which mention John de Caldewell of Cordwell in Holmesfield near Dronfield.

Bearers of the name:

- Belinda Cordwell (born 1965), New Zealand tennis player
- Norah Blaney (née Cordwell) (1893–1983), British music-hall performer
