= Laputa Nunataks =

Nunatak range in Graham Land, Antarctica

Location of Oscar II Coast on Antarctic Peninsula.

The Laputa Nunataks (66°8′S 62°58′W) are a range of nunataks and snow-covered hills with minor rock outcrops, rising from about 500 metres (1,600 ft) to over 1,000 metres (3,300 ft), and located 6 nautical miles (11 km) northwest of Adie Inlet on the east side of Graham Land, Antarctica. They were first charted by the Falkland Islands Dependencies Survey and photographed from the air by the Ronne Antarctic Research Expedition in 1947. They were named by the UK Antarctic Place-Names Committee after Laputa, the flying island in Jonathan Swift's Gulliver's Travels.
