= Lamplugh Island =

Island in Victoria Land, Antarctica

- Location within Antarctica
- Etymology: Ross Sea

Geography
- Location: Victoria Land
- Coordinates: 75°38′S 162°45′E

Administration
- Antarctica

Lamplugh Island (75°38′S 162°45′E) is an ice-capped island, 10 nautical miles (19 km; 12 mi) long, lying 4 nautical miles (7.4 km; 4.6 mi) north of Whitmer Peninsula, along the coast of Victoria Land, Antarctica.

== Discovery and naming ==
Lamplugh Island was first sighted by the British National Antarctic Expedition, 1901–04, led by Robert Falcon Scott, but it was first charted as an island by the British Antarctic Expedition, 1907–09 under Ernest Shackleton. It was named by Shackleton for George William Lamplugh, who gave assistance to the expedition.

== Location ==
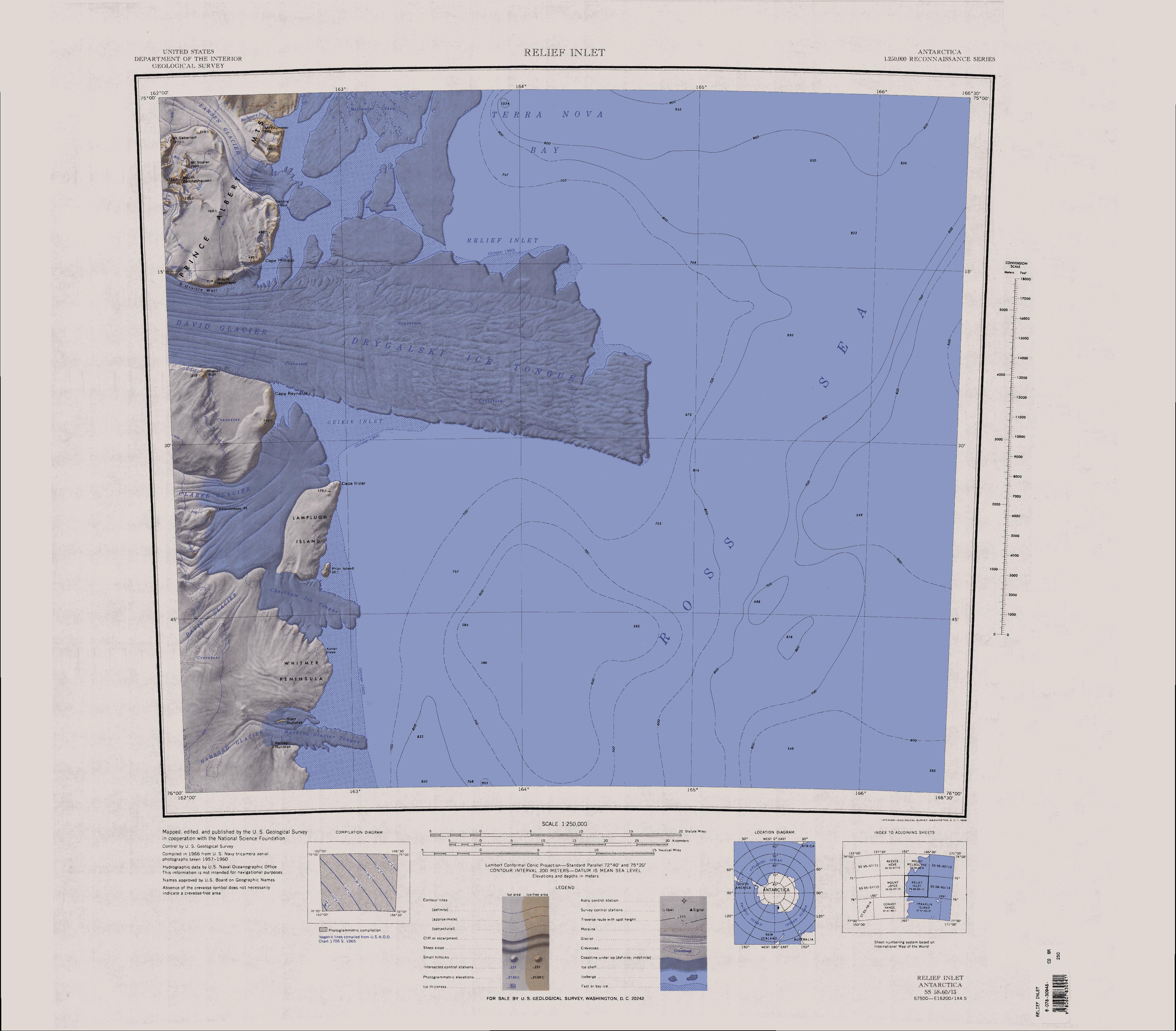
Terra Nova Bay in north center of map. Nansen Ice Shelf is darker blue area to the northeast

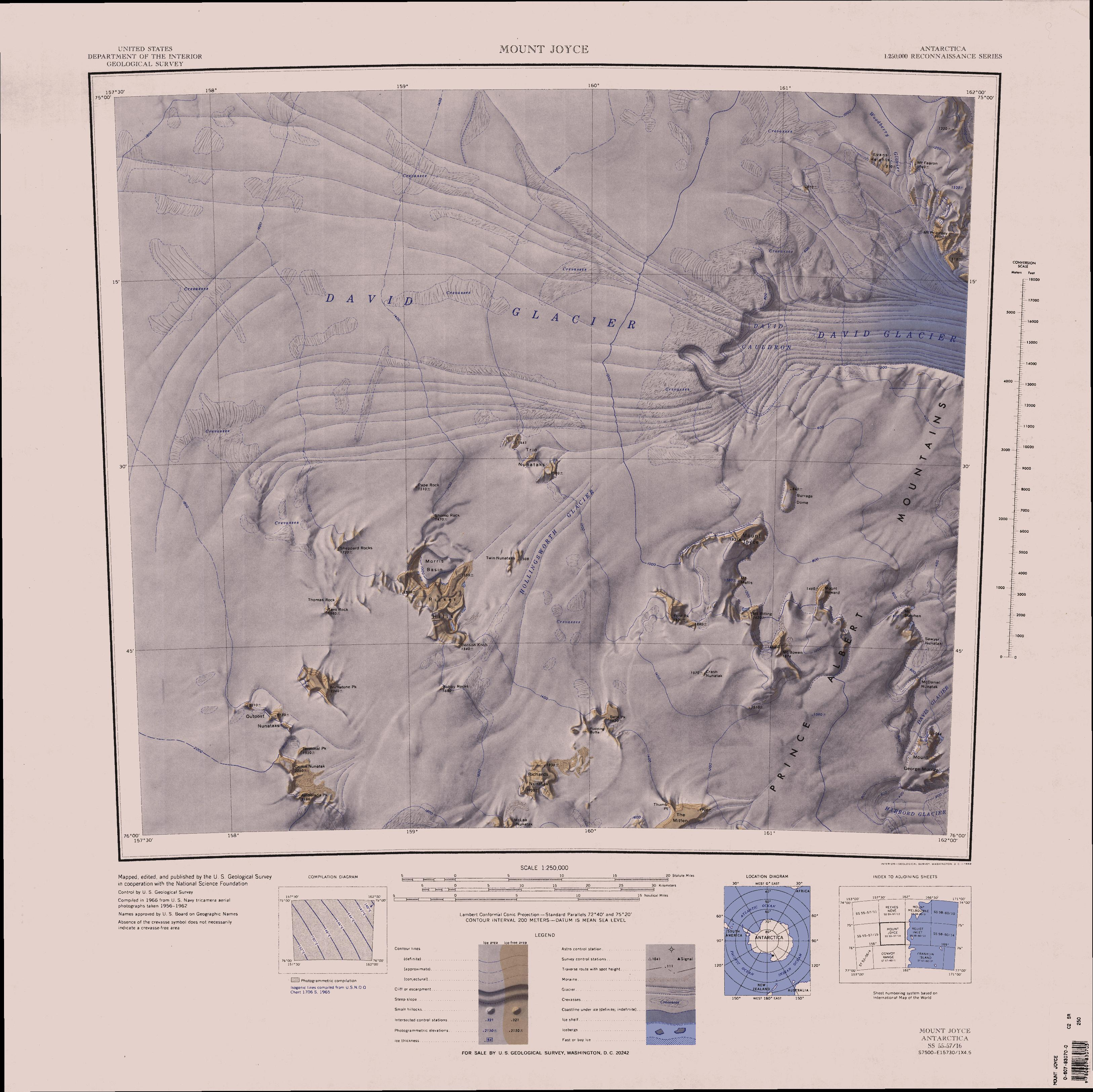
Upper section of the glacier

Lamplugh Island is off the coast of Victoria Land, in the Ross Sea, to the south of Geikie Inlet and the Drygalski Ice Tongue. Cape Irizar is at its north end. Prior Island lies off its south end. Clarke Glacier enters the sea past Lewandowski Point and flows past the north end of the island. Davis Glacier flows towards the south end of the island, where the Cheetham Ice Tongue covers the sea between the island and the Whitmer Peninsula. Davis Glacier forms in the Prince Albert Mountains to the south of Mount Stephen, Sawyer Nunatak and McDaniel Nunatak, and north of Mount George Murray.

== Features ==
Features of the island and the nearby mainland terrain include:

=== Cape Irizar ===
75°33′S 162°57′E. A bold rocky headland that forms the north end of Lamplugh Island, off the coast of Victoria Land. Discovered by the British National Antarctic Expedition (BrNAE), 1901-04, under Scott. He named it for Captain Julian Irizar, of the Argentine naval vessel Uruguay, who rescued the shipwrecked members of the Swedish Antarctic Expedition of 1901-04.

=== Prior Island ===
75°41′S 162°52′E. An island 1 nautical mile (1.9 km; 1.2 mi) long, lying just east of Lamplugh Island, off the coast of Victoria Land. First charted and.named by the British Antarctic Expedition, 1907–09, under Shackleton. Probably named for George Thurland Prior, Keeper of the Dept. of Minerals, British Museum, 1909-27.

=== Clarke Glacier ===
75°34′S 162°05′E. A glacier, 5 nautical miles (9.3 km; 5.8 mi) long, draining east to the coast of Victoria Land immediately north of Lewandowski Point. The seaward extremity of this glacier merges with the flow of Davis Glacier and other glaciers from the south and contributes to the floating tongue of ice between Cape Reynolds and Lamplugh Island. Discovered and named by the British Antarctic Expedition, 1907-09, under Shackleton.

=== Lewandowski Point ===
75°36′S 162°13′E. A rugged, partially ice-free point on the Victoria Land coast, marking the south side of the mouth of Clarke Glacier. Mapped by the United States Geological Survey (USGS) from surveys and United States Navy tricamera aerial photographs, 1957-62. Named by the United States Advisory Committee on Antarctic Names (US-ACAN) for John R. Lewandowski, United States Navy, Chief Construction Electrician at McMurdo Station, 1965-66 and 1966-67.

=== Cheetham Ice Tongue ===
75°45′S 162°55′E. A small ice tongue on the east coast of Victoria Land between Lamplugh Island and Whitmer Peninsula. It projects eastward into Ross Sea. The tongue appears to be nourished in part by Davis Glacier and partly by ice draining from Lamplugh Island and Whitmer Peninsula. First charted by the British Antarctic Expedition, 1907-09, under Shackleton, and named by him for Alfred B. Cheetham, third officer on the Nimrod.

=== Davis Glacier ===
75°45′S 162°10′E. A heavily crevassed glacier, 15 nautical miles (28 km; 17 mi) long, draining the northwest slopes of Mount George Murray and flowing to the coast of Victoria Land opposite the south end of Lamplugh Island. The glacier contributes to ice that flows north along the west side of Lamplugh Island and to the Cheetham Ice Tongue. First charted by the British Antarctic Expedition, 1907-09, under Shackleton, who named it for John King Davis, first officer and later captain of the expedition ship Nimrod.

=== Mount Stephen ===
75°42′S 161°43′E. A mountain, 810 metres (2,660 ft) high, standing 6 nautical miles (11 km; 6.9 mi) east of Mount Howard in the Prince Albert Mountains. Mapped by USGS from surveys and United States Navy air photos, 1956-62. Named by US-AC AN for Ronald R. Stephen, meteorologist with the South Pole Station winter party, 1966.

=== Sawyer Nunatak ===
75°44′S 161°50′E. A small but distinctive nunatak standing 3 nautical miles (5.6 km; 3.5 mi) southeast of Mount Stephens in the Prince Albert Mountains. Mapped by USGS from surveys and United States Navy air photos, 1956-62. Named by US-ACAN for Joseph O. Sawyer, satellite geodesist with the McMurdo Station winter party, 1966.

=== McDaniel Nunatak ===
75°48′S 161°48′E. A ridgelike projection at the north side of the head of Davis Glacier, about 5 nautical miles (9.3 km; 5.8 mi) north of Mount George Murray, in the Prince Albert Mountains. Mapped by USGS from surveys and United States Navy air photos, 1956-62. Named by US-ACAN for James R. McDaniel, satellite geodesist with the McMurdo Station winter party, 1966.

=== Mount George Murray ===
75°54′S 161°50′E. A flat-topped, mainly ice-covered mountain rising between the heads of Davis Glacier and Harbord Glacier in the Prince Albert Mountains. Discovered by the BrNAE, 1901-04, which named it for George R.M. Murray of the British Museum staff director of the scientific aims of Scott's expedition.

== Sources ==
- Alberts, Fred G., ed. (1995), Geographic Names of the Antarctic (PDF) (2 ed.), United States Board on Geographic Names This article incorporates public domain material from websites or documents of the United States Board on Geographic Names.
- Mount Joyce, USGS: United States Geological Survey
- Relief Inlet, USGS: United States Geological Survey

This article incorporates public domain material from websites or documents of the United States Geological Survey.
