= Quest Nunatak =

Nunatak in Coats Land, Antarctica

Quest Nunatak (81°31′S 28°10′W) is the northeasternmost of the Whichaway Nunataks, 1,065 m. First mapped in 1957 by the Commonwealth Trans-Antarctic Expedition, it was so named because it was the last rock outcrop visited on the transpolar route of the Commonwealth Trans-Antarctic Expedition in December 1957 when a further search was made for plant fossils previously found in the area by the expedition's geologist.
