= Pauley, Kentucky =

Unincorporated community in Kentucky, United States

Pauley
- Unincorporated community
- Location within the state of Kentucky Pauley (the United States)
- Coordinates: 37°29′41″N 82°32′7″W
- Country: United States
- State: Kentucky
- County: Pike
- Elevation: 656 ft (200 m)
- Time zone: UTC-6 (Central (CST))
  - Summer (DST): UTC-5 (CST)
- GNIS feature ID: 500273

Pauley is an unincorporated community and coal town in Pike County, Kentucky, United States. Their post office is closed. It was also known as Panley.
