= See Nunatak =

See Nunatak (68°19′S 59°9′E) is the northernmost of the group of peaks forming the eastern part of the Hansen Mountains. Plotted from ANARE air photos. It was named by the Antarctic Names Committee of Australia (ANCA) for R. See, chief helicopter mechanic with the 1965 ANARE (Nella Dan), led by Phillip Law.
