= Gutenko Nunataks =

Coordinates: 76°53′S 143°40′W

The Gutenko Nunataks are small, elongated nunataks 1 nautical mile (2 km) west of Mount Morgan in the Ford Ranges of Marie Byrd Land, Antarctica. They were discovered on aerial flights made from the West Base of the United States Antarctic Service in 1940. They were named after Sigmund Gutenko, a cook and steward at West Base.
