= Mason Peaks =

Mountains in Antarctica

The Mason Peaks (72°46′S 74°44′E) are a prominent serrated ridge with several peaks, standing 8 nautical miles (15 km) northwest of Mount Harding in the Grove Mountains of Antarctica. The feature was mapped by Australian National Antarctic Research Expeditions from air photos, 1956–60, and was named by the Antarctic Names Committee of Australia for A.C. Mason, a topographic draftsman at the Division of National Mapping, Australian Department of National Development, who has contributed substantially to the compilation of Antarctic maps.
