= Alderdice Peak =

Mountain in Antarctica

Alderdice Peak (68°12′S 49°35′E) is a peak 6 miles (10 km) southeast of Mount Underwood in the eastern part of the Nye Mountains. It was plotted from air photos taken by an Australian National Antarctic Research Expeditions aircraft in 1959, and was named by the Antarctic Names Committee of Australia for William Henry (Harry) Alderdice, a weather observer at Wilkes Station in 1959.
