= Mount Henry (Enderby Land) =

Mountain in Enderby Land, Antarctica

Mount Henry (67°43′S 50°17′E) is a mountain, 1,500 metres (5,000 ft) high, standing 1 nautical mile (2 km) east of Simpson Peak in the Scott Mountains of Enderby Land, Antarctica. It was plotted from air photos taken from Australian National Antarctic Research Expeditions aircraft in 1956. The name was first applied by John Biscoe in 1831 to a feature which cannot now be identified, and was probably after one of the Enderby Brothers, the owners of Biscoe's vessel.
