= Manning Nunataks =

Mountains in Antarctica

The Manning Nunataks (71°0′S 71°12′E) are a group of nunataks on the eastern side of the southern part of the Amery Ice Shelf, Antarctica, about 20 nautical miles (37 km) north-northeast of Pickering Nunatak. They were photographed from the air by Australian National Antarctic Research Expeditions in 1957, and were named by the Antarctic Names Committee of Australia for Sergeant A.S. Manning, Royal Australian Air Force, an airframe fitter at Mawson Station in 1958.

== Nunataks ==
- Kenneth Ridge
- New Year Nunatak
- Mitchell Nunatak
