= Mount Morgan (Antarctica) =

Mountain in Marie Byrd Land, Antarctica

- Location within Antarctica

Highest point
- Elevation: 999 m (3,278 ft)

Geography
- Parent range: Ford Ranges

Mount Morgan (76°53′S 143°34′W) is a 999 metres (3,278 ft) high mountain in the West Antarctic Marie Byrd Land. It is located within the Ford Ranges 8 kilometres (5.0 mi) northeast of Mount Swan.

The United States Antarctic Service discovered and mapped it during its 1939-1941 expedition. The Advisory Committee on Antarctic Names named the mountain in 1966 after Charles Gill Morgan (1906-1980), a geologist in the second Antarctic expedition (1933-1935) of the US polar explorer Richard Evelyn Byrd.
