= Mount Gjeita =

Mountain in Antarctica

Coordinates: 68°12′S 58°14′E

Mount Gjeita (Norwegian: Gjeitafjell), or Mount Banfield in Australian sources, is the highest peak (1700 m) in the Hansen Mountains, Kemp Land. It is situated about 3 nautical miles to the east of Brusen Nunatak. It was originally mapped and named by Norwegian cartographers working with air photos taken by the Lars Christensen Expedition, 1936-37. In 1959, the Government of Australia named the peak as Mount Banfield after Flight Lieutenant G.A. Banfield, RAAF pilot at Mawson Station.
