= Penney Bay =

Bay in Antarctica

Coordinates: 66°26′S 110°36′E

Location of Penney Bay in Antarctica

Penney Bay is a large bay extending from Robinson Ridge to Browning Peninsula, at the eastern side of the Windmill Islands. First mapped from air photos taken by U.S. Navy (USN) OpHjp, 1946–47. Named by Advisory Committee on Antarctic Names (US-ACAN) for Richard L. Penney, ornithologist and biologist at Wilkes Station in 1959 and 1960.
