= Hansen Mountains =

Mountains in Antarctica

Coordinates: 68°16′S 58°47′E

Hansen Mountains (Norwegian: Hansenfjella) is a large group of nunataks rising to about 300 m (980 ft) above the Antarctic plateau. The mountains are approximately 89 km (55 mi) south of Stefansson Bay and they extend 40 km (25 mi) from northwest to southeast in Kemp Land, East Antarctica. The Hansen Mountains were first mapped by Norwegian cartographers from air photos taken by the 1936–1937 Lars Christensen Expedition. They were named for H.E. Hansen, the Norwegian cartographer who compiled the maps for this and other Norwegian Antarctic expeditions.

Standing at 1,700 m (5,600 ft), their highest peak is Mount Gjeita, known in Australian sources as Mount Banfield. Their northernmost peak is called Fram Peak, named "Framfjellet" (the forward peak) by the personnel of the Lars Christensen Expedition.

== See also ==
- Billingane Peaks, located east-southeast of See Nunatak at the eastern end of the Hansen Mountains
- Galtefjellet, southeastern of two rock outliers on the south side of Purka Mountain in the Hansen Mountains
- Melfjellet, rock outcrop in the eastern part of the Hansen Mountains
