= Browning Peninsula =

Peninsula in Antarctica

Location of Browning Peninsula
Antarctica

Browning Peninsula (66°28′S 110°33′E) is a rocky peninsula, 4 miles (6.4 km) long, separating Penney Bay and Eyres Bay at the south end of the Windmill Islands. It was first mapped from air photos taken by U.S. Navy Operation Highjump and Operation Windmill in 1947 and 1948. It was named by the Advisory Committee on Antarctic Names for Commander Charles L. Browning, U.S. Navy, chief staff officer with Operation Windmill and later staff officer with Task Force 43, the logistic arm of U.S. Navy Operation Deep Freeze, 1955–56.
