= Mount Harding =

Mountain in Princess Elizabeth Land, Antarctica

Coordinates: 72°53′S 75°2′E

Mount Harding is the largest mountain in the Grove Mountains of Antarctica, in the south-central part of the range and about 4 nautical miles (7 km) west of Gale Escarpment. It was mapped by the Australian National Antarctic Research Expeditions (1956–60) from aerial photographs, and was named by the Antarctic Names Committee of Australia for N.E. Harding, a topographic draftsman with the Division of National Mapping, Australian Department of National Development, who contributed substantially to the production of Antarctic maps.

== Antarctic Specially Protected Area ==
The mountain is protected under the Antarctic Treaty System as Antarctic Specially Protected Area (ASPA) No.168. The main reason for the designation is to protect its unique geomorphological features for scientific research on the evolutionary history of the East Antarctic Ice Sheet, and to preserve its scientific, aesthetic and wilderness values.
