= Nye Mountains =

Antarctic mountain range

Nye Mountains (68°10′S 49°0′E) is a group of mountains, 30 nautical miles (60 km) long and 10 to 15 nautical miles (28 km) wide, which trend eastward from the head of Rayner Glacier. They were sighted by Squadron Leader D. Leckie, RAAF, during an ANARE (Australian National Antarctic Research Expeditions) flight in October 1956. Named by Antarctic Names Committee of Australia (ANCA) for P.B. Nye, former Director of the Bureau of Mineral Resources, Australian Department of National Development.
