= Nunatak =

Landform within an ice field or glacier

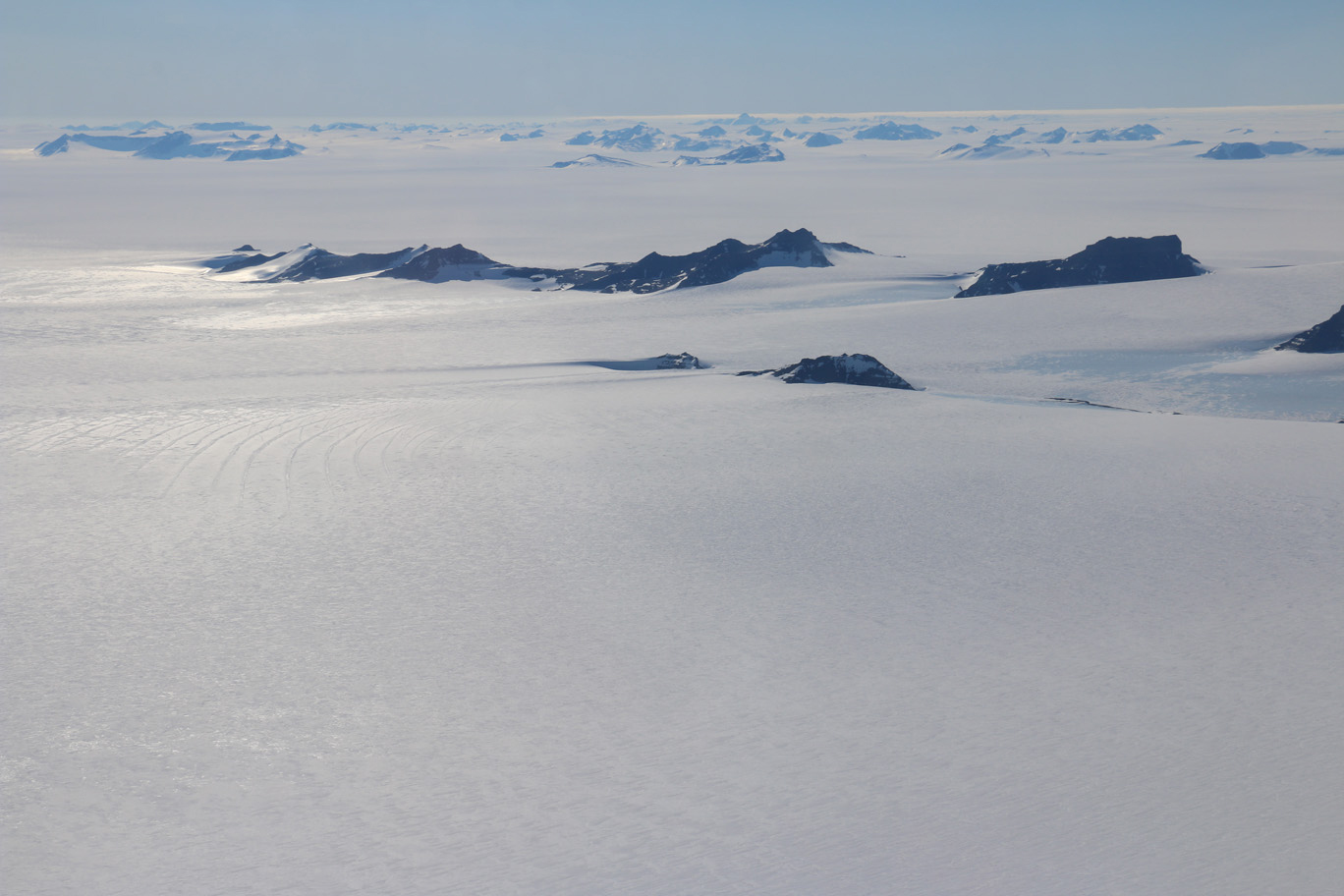
Nunataks in Antarctica

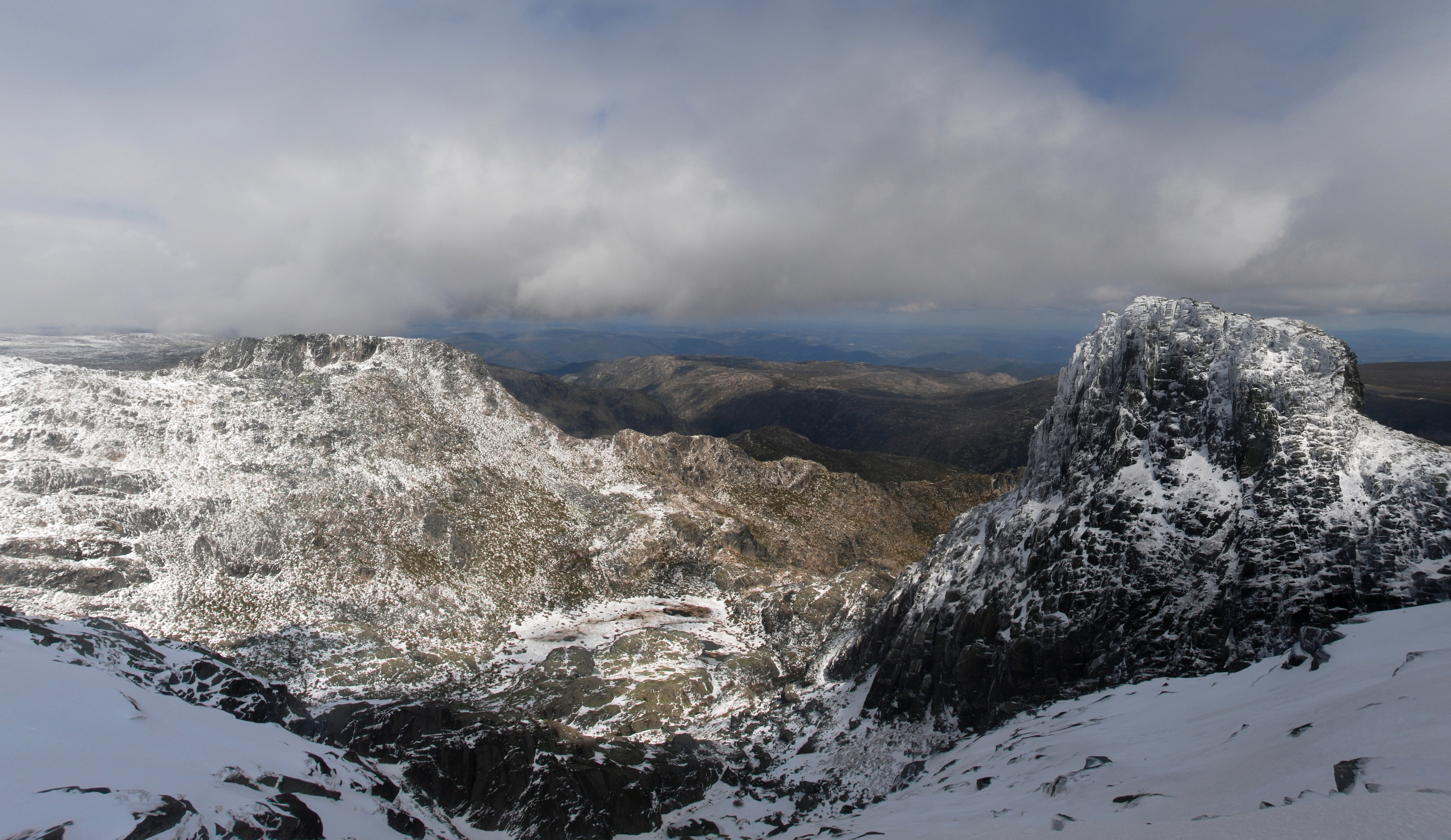
Cântaro Magro, Serra da Estrela, Portugal, formed as a nunatak during the last ice age and now exposed.

A nunatak (from Inuit nunataq) is the summit or ridge of a mountain that protrudes from an ice field or glacier that otherwise covers most of the mountain or ridge. They often form natural pyramidal peaks. Isolated nunataks are also called glacial islands, and smaller nunataks rounded by glacial action may be referred to as rognons.

The word is of Greenlandic origin and has been used in English since the 1870s.

== Description ==
The term nunatak is typically used in areas where a permanent ice sheet is present and the ridge protrudes above the sheet. Nunataks present readily identifiable landmark reference points in glaciers or ice caps and are often named. While some are isolated, they can also form dense clusters, such as Queen Louise Land in Greenland.

Nunataks are generally angular and jagged, hampering the formation of glacial ice on their tops, although snow can accumulate on them. This can contrast strongly with the softer contours of the glacially eroded land after a glacier retreats. They are not greatly affected by frost weathering, given the low frequency of freeze-thaw cycles in areas of ice caps and ice sheets.

Typically nunataks are the only places where plant life can survive on ice sheets or ice caps. Lifeforms on nunataks are often isolated by the surrounding ice or glacier, providing unique habitats.

== List ==
- Aitken Nunatak
- Åkerlundh Nunatak
- Allan Hills aka Allan Nunatak
- All-Blacks Nunataks
- Altsek Nunatak
- Anderson Nunataks
- Anoritooq
- Appalachia Nunataks
- Arena Corner
- Arkhangel'skiy Nunataks
- Arrowhead Nunatak
- Atanasoff Nunatak
- Aviator Nunatak
- Belknap Nunatak
- Berg Mountains
- Bering Nunatak
- Bon Docteur Nunatak
- Bradley Nunatak
- Branson Nunatak
- Brusilov Nunataks
- Butcher Nunatak
- Cabrera Nunatak
- Calfee Nunatak
- Cameron Nunataks
- Canisp, formed as a nunatak
- Carapace Nunatak
- Cassandra Nunatak
- Castillo Nunatak
- Castor Nunatak
- Cat Nunatak
- Catenary Nunatak
- Cathedral Peak
- C. H. Ostenfeld Nunatak
- Chain Nunataks
- Cheeks Nunatak
- Chocolate Nunatak
- Clem Nunatak
- Cone Nunatak
- Copper Nunataks
- Cowie Nunatak
- Crash Nunatak
- Crosby Nunataks
- Daniels Hill
- Dean Nunataks
- Dee Nunatak
- Director Nunatak
- Dodd Nunatak
- Dome Nunatak
- Dotten Nunatak
- Dow Nunatak
- Downs Nunatak
- Drury Nunatak
- Du Toit Nunataks
- Dziura Nunatak
- Eaton Nunatak
- Eckins Nunatak
- Else Nunataks
- Erehwon Nunatak
- Erven Nunataks
- Esther Nunatak
- Everett Nunatak
- Exile Nunatak
- Exiles Nunataks
- Fallone Nunataks
- Faraway How
- Farquharson Nunatak
- Ferguson Nunataks
- Fiebelman Nunatak
- Filson Nunatak
- Fin Nunatak
- Florence Nunatak
- Foltz Nunatak
- Fomalhaut Nunatak
- Footscrew Nunatak
- Fraser Nunatak
- Friedmann Nunataks
- Galkin Nunatak
- Gallen Nunatak
- Gardner Nunatak
- Gillett Nunataks
- George Nunatak
- Gomez Nunatak
- Goodwin Nunataks
- Gootee Nunatak
- Gora Severny Nunatak
- Gordon Nunataks
- Gould Nunataks
- Gratton Nunatak
- Grayson Nunatak
- Gromov Nunataks
- Gronau Nunataks
- Grossman Nunataks
- Guardian Nunatak
- Haigh Nunatak
- Half Century Nunatak
- Half Dome Nunatak
- Halfway Nunatak
- Hamner Nunatak
- Harter Nunatak
- Harvey Nunataks
- Haupt Nunatak
- Henry Nunataks
- Herrmann Nunatak
- Heuser Nunatak
- Heverley Nunataks
- Holt Nunatak
- Hopalong Nunatak
- Horne Nunataks
- House Nunatak
- Hutchins Nunataks
- Jaques Nunatak
- Jane Peak
- Jarina Nunatak
- John Nunatak
- Johnson Nunataks
- Jorgensen Nunataks
- Jutulsessen
- Kalafut Nunatak
- Kamenev Nunatak
- Kenfield Nunatak
- Kinter Nunatak
- Kjuklingen Nunatak
- Klawatti Peak
- Klinck Nunatak
- Knight Nunatak
- Koehler Nunatak
- Komatsu Nunatak
- Kozlov Nunataks
- Krasin Nunataks
- Krasnaya Nunatak
- Krigsvold Nunataks
- Kyle Nunataks
- Lacroix Nunatak
- Lands End Nunataks
- Lang Nunatak
- Laputa Nunataks
- Last Cache Nunatak
- Lawson Nunatak
- Lawson Nunataks
- Leach Nunatak
- Lee Nunatak
- Lepley Nunatak
- Lewisohn Nunatak
- Lilliput Nunataks
- Lodalskåpa
- Lonely One Nunatak
- Lonewolf Nunataks
- Longs Nunatak
- López Nunatak
- Luck Nunatak
- Luff Nunatak
- Luhrsen Nunatak
- McCarthy Nunatak
- McDaniel Nunatak
- MacDonald Nunataks
- McGrath Nunatak
- McNair Nunatak
- Maish Nunatak
- Marcoux Nunatak
- Marshall Nunatak
- Martin Nunataks
- Mathis Nunataks
- Marujupu Peak
- Meade Nunatak
- Meyers Nunatak
- Miller Nunatak
- Miller Nunataks
- Milles Nunatak
- Mirfak Nunatak
- Mizar Nunataks
- Moody Nunatak
- Moltke Nunataks
- Moreland Nunatak
- Morgan Nunataks
- Morse Nunataks
- Mulgrew Nunatak
- Musson Nunatak
- Neptune Nunataks
- Névé Nunatak
- Newman Nunataks
- Nødtvedt Nunataks
- Noble Nunatak
- Nodule Nunatak
- Nunatakassak
- Nunatarsuaq
- Nunatarsuaq (Tasiusaq Bay)
- Olander Nunatak
- Olson Nunatak
- Omega Nunatak
- Organpipe Nunatak
- Orsugissap Qaqqarsua
- Outrider Nunatak
- Packsaddle Island
- Papanin Nunataks
- Pawley Nunataks
- Pollux Nunatak
- Potter Nunataks
- Price Nunatak
- Queen Louise Land
- Quest Nunatak
- Quilty Nunataks
- R4D Nunatak
- Ranney Nunatak
- Rebholz Nunatak
- Recess Nunatak
- Rescue Nunatak
- Reynolds Nunatak
- Ringed Nunatak
- Robertson Nunatak
- Rutland Nunatak
- Sage Nunataks
- Salient Nunatak
- Sanders Nunatak
- Savin Nunatak
- Sawyer Nunatak
- Scheimpflug Nunatak
- Schloredt Nunatak
- Schoofs Nunatak
- Seacatch Nunataks
- See Nunatak
- Sevier Nunatak
- Shelton Nunataks
- Ship Nunatak
- Shoemake Nunatak
- Singleton Nunatak
- Slusher Nunatak
- Småhausane Nunataks
- Smørstabben Nunatak
- Solitary Nunatak
- Sonntag Nunatak
- Spectator Nunatak
- Stac Pollaidh, formed as a nunatak
- Stanford Nunatak
- Starr Nunatak
- Static Nunatak
- Stewart Hills
- Stinear Nunataks
- Striated Nunatak
- Suilven, formed as a nunatak
- Svarthamaren Mountain
- Swarsen Nunatak
- Swartz Nunataks
- Symes Nunatak
- Syningen Nunatak
- Table Nunatak
- Taurus Nunataks
- Teltet Nunatak
- Temnikow Nunataks
- Tern Nunatak
- Tester Nunatak
- Themis Nunatak
- Threshold Nunatak
- Tomandl Nunatak
- Tommeliten Rock
- Tomovick Nunatak
- Toth Nunataks
- Trillingane Nunataks
- Trioen Nunataks
- Trubyatchinskiy Nunatak
- Tuning Nunatak
- Turret Nunatak
- Tuttulikassak
- Twin Nunataks
- Utsteinen Nunatak
- Varney Nunatak
- Velchev Rock
- Vesleskarvet
- Velie Nunatak
- Vesthaugen Nunatak
- Vorta Nunatak
- Vulcan Nunatak
- Walker Nunatak
- Wallis Nunataks
- Walsh Nunatak
- Wandel Land
- Ward Nunataks
- Watkins Range
- Weather Guesser Nunataks
- Weikman Nunataks
- Whichaway Nunataks
- Whistler Nunatak
- White Nunataks
- Wilds Nunatak
- Willan Nunatak
- Williams Nunatak
- Willows Nunatak
- Windscoop Nunataks
- Witte Nunataks
- Wold Nunatak
- Wyers Nunataks
- Yingling Nunatak
- Young Nunataks
- Zohn Nunataks

== See also ==
- Fell – High and barren landscape feature
- Glacial landform – Landform created by the action of glaciers
