= Australian Antarctic Names and Medals Committee =

Advisory committee

- Founded: 1952

The Australian Antarctic Names and Medals Committee (AANMC) was established to advise the Government on names for features in the Australian Antarctic Territory and the subantarctic territory of Heard Island and the McDonald Islands. The committee also issues nominations Governor General for the award of the Australian Antarctic Medal.

Committee members were appointed by the Minister or Parliamentary Secretary responsible for Antarctic matters. The committee was founded in 1952 as the Antarctic Names Committee of Australia, and changed to the current name in 1982 to reflect the multiple functions that the committee is responsible for. The committee was replaced by the Australian Antarctic Division Place names Committee in 2015.

== Features named by the committee ==
- Burch Peaks, named after W.M. Burch, geophysicist
- Fyfe Hills, named after W.V. Fyfe, Surveyor General of Western Australia
- Goldsworthy Ridge, named after R.W. Goldsworthy, survey field assistant
- Gowlett Peaks, named afterAlan Gowlett, engineer
- Haigh Nunatak, named after John Haigh, geophysicist
- McNair Nunatak, named after Richard McNair, cook
- Mount Cordwell, named after T.S. Cordwell, radio officer
- Mount Smethurst, named after N.R. Smethurst, officer-in-charge at Wilkes Station
- Mount Stadler, named after S. Stadler, weather observer
- Mount Torckler, named after R.M. Torckler, radio officer
- Onley Hill, named after L. Onley, weather observer
- Trost Rocks, named after P.A. Trost, electronics engineer
- Mitchell Nunatak, named after R. Mitchell, a senior diesel mechanic at Mawson Station in 1969
- Kenneth Ridge, named after Kenneth A. Smith, a radio officer at Mawson Station in 1969, and a member of the ANARE Prince Charles Mountains survey party in the same year
- New Year Nunatak

== See also ==
- Australian Antarctic Division
- SCAR Composite Gazetteer of Antarctica
- UK_Antarctic_Place-Names_Committee
