= South Masson Range =

Mountains at Antarctica

- Location within Antarctica

Highest point
- Elevation: 1,070 m (3,510 ft)
- Coordinates: 67°53′S 62°47′E

Geography
- Location: Antarctica
- Region: Mac. Robertson Land

The South Masson Range (67°53′S 62°47′E) is the southernmost of the three parts into which the Masson Range of the Framnes Mountains, Antarctica is divided. It rises to 1,070 metres (3,510 ft) and extends 2 miles (3.2 km) in a northeast-southwest arc.

== Physical ==
The South Masson Range has quite a different topology from the North Masson Range and Central Masson Range. When the Trilling Peaks are included (Note: Filson (1966) includes the Price Nunatak and other nunataks to the south in the South Masson Range. We follow Alberts (1995) in treating these nunataks as part of the separate Trilling Peaks.), it includes about fifteen separate nunataks and the northern group containing Mount Burnett, Trost Peak, and the connecting ridge.

== Botany ==
Just south of Trost Peak, there is a long, flat ridge where many lichens are present, notably patches of Omphalodiscus decussatus more than 1 metre (3 ft 3 in) across. The moss Coscinodon lawianus is also abundant on the ridge, the furthest point from the sea recorded for this species. To the south of the snow slope on Trost Peak, there are two peaks, a northern one of badly weathered banded gneiss, and a southern one similar to Mawson Granite. The northern peak has no lichen, but the southern one has many species, including abundant Rhizocarpon flavum and Caloplaca elegans var. pulvinata. The ridge connecting to Mount Burnett, about 1,050 metres (3,440 ft) in altitude, and the moraine scree slopes on the north of the ridge have many lichens among the rocks. Biatorella antarctica is abundant on Mount Burnett, but there are low numbers of Caloplaca elegans var. pulvinata. Located to the south is the Branson Nunatak, which rises to an elevation of approximately 1,170 meters (3,840 feet). There is a wide variety of flora on Branson Nunatak, but it is sparser than on the northern peaks.

== Exploration ==
The Masson Range was discovered and named by BANZARE, 1929-31, under Mawson. This southern range was mapped by Norwegian cartographers from air photos taken by the Lars Christensen Expedition, 1936-37, and named Sörkammen (the south comb or crest). The approved name, suggested by ANCA in 1960, more clearly identifies the feature as a part of the Masson Range. Not: Gora Serkammen, Sörkammen, Sørkammen Crest, South Crest.

== Features ==
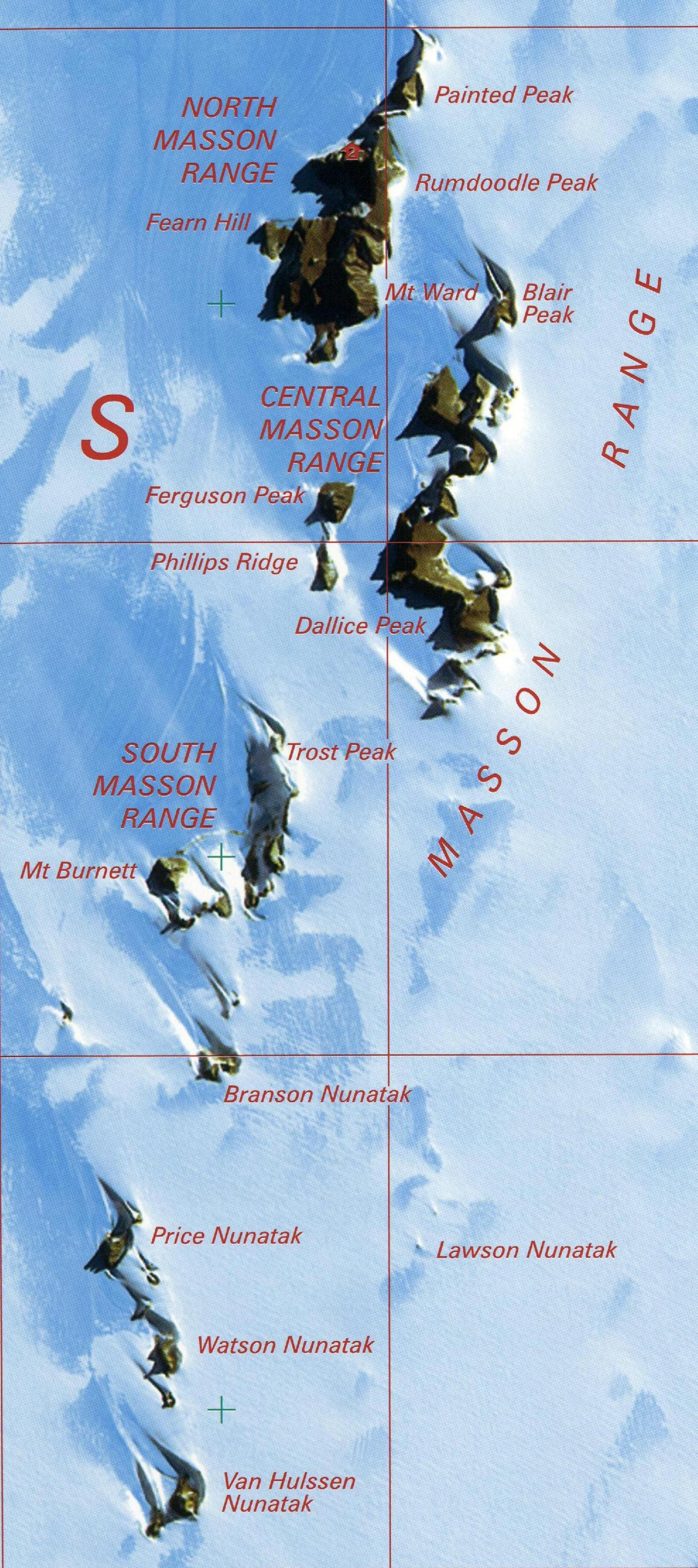
Masson Mountains (upper and center) and Trilling Peaks (lower)

Features include:

=== Trost Peak ===
67°52′S 62°48′E. Peak, 980 metres (3,220 ft), standing 1.5 miles (2.4 km) northeast of Mount Burnett in the Masson Range of the Framnes Mountains. Mapped by Norwegian cartographers from aerial photos taken by the Lars Christensen Expedition, 1936-37. Remapped by ANARE, 1957-60, and named for P.A. Trost, physicist at Mawson Station, 1958.

=== Mount Burnett ===
67°53′S 62°45′E. Peak, 1,050 m, standing 1.5 mi SW of Trost Peak in the Masson Range of the Framnes Mountains. }Mapped by Norwegian cartographers from aerial photos taken by the Lars Christensen Expedition, 1936-37. Remapped by ANARE, 1957-60, and named for Eric Burnett, radiophysicist at Mawson Station, 1958.

=== Branson Nunatak ===
67°55′S 62°46′E. Nunatak between Mount Burnett and Price Nunatak in the Framnes Mountains, Mac. Robertson Land. Mapped by Norwegian cartographers from air photos taken by the Lars Christensen Expedition, 1936-37, and named Horntind (horn peak). Renamed by ANCA for J. Branson, geophysicist at Mawson Station in 1962. Not: Horntind.

=== Lawson Nunatak ===
67°56′S 62°51′E. A small tooth-like nunatak lying 2 miles (3.2 km) southeast of Branson Nunatak in the Masson Range of the Framnes Mountains. The feature was fixed by intersection from trigonometrical stations by ANARE in 1968. Named by ANCA for E.J. Lawson, a diesel mechanic at Mawson Station, who assisted with the survey work in 1967.

== Sources ==
- Alberts, Fred G., ed. (1995), Geographic Names of the Antarctic (PDF) (2 ed.), United States Board on Geographic Names This article incorporates public domain material from websites or documents of the United States Board on Geographic Names.
- Filson, Rex B. (1966), The Lichens and Mosses of Mac.Robertson Land (PDF), Antarctic Division, Department of External Affairs Australia
- Framnes Mountains Satellite Image Map, Australian Antarctic Data Centre
