= McGrath Nunatak =

Mountain in antarctica

Coordinates: 68°3′S 63°1′E

McGrath Nunatak is a ridge-like nunatak at the west end of the Blånabbane Nunataks, standing 7 nautical miles (13 km) southeast of Van Hulssen Nunatak in Mac. Robertson Land, Antarctica. It was mapped by Norwegian cartographers from air photos taken by the Lars Christensen Expedition, 1936–37, and was named by the Antarctic Names Committee of Australia for P.J. McGrath, a radio officer at Mawson Station who assisted in the Australian National Antarctic Research Expeditions' Framnes Mountains – Depot Peak survey during 1965.
