= Neville Parsons =

Neville Ronsley Parsons PM (2 September 1926 – 30 December 2017) was an Australian physicist and Antarctic researcher.

Parsons was born in Tasmania in 1926, and educated at Scotch College, Launceston and the Universities of Tasmania and Melbourne.

From 1949 Parsons spent fourteen years on the staff of the Australian National Antarctic Research Expeditions (ANARE), spending 1950 at Macquarie Island and 1955 at Mawson Station in Antarctica as a cosmic ray and auroral physicist, establishing cosmic ray observatories in each case. He also spent the summers of 1961-62 and 1963-64 at Macquarie Island participating in joint programs with the University of California of high-altitude balloon studies of x-rays associated with auroral displays.

During his time at Mawson Station in Antarctica he was a member of a five-man party led by John Béchervaise which, in early January 1956, made the first ever visits to the Masson, David and Casey ranges south west of the station. Mount Parsons, a prominent peak in the David Range bears his name. It features on one of the Australia Post series of stamps, issued in 2013, featuring Antarctic mountains.

Neville Parsons was awarded the Polar Medal in 1956. He was a founding member of the ANARE Club in 1951.

In 1964 he moved to the University of Calgary in Canada where he continued auroral research, becoming Professor of Physics and then Head of the Faculty of Science. He returned to Brisbane in 1978 and, in 1988, retired from the position of Director of the Brisbane College of Advanced Education, resettling back in his native Tasmania.

His first wife, Jean (née McKechnie), died in 1983. Their son Targ lives in Hong Kong and daughter Alessandra (Sasha) lives in Brisbane. He was remarried in 1986 to Jennifer (née Clifford) with whom he lived in Hobart, Tasmania.
