= Smith Peaks =

Mountain in Antarctica

Smith Peaks (67°57′S 62°29′E) is a group of peaks standing close south of Mount Hordern in the David Range of the Framnes Mountains. Mapped by Norwegian cartographers from aerial photographs taken by the Lars Christensen Expedition, 1936–37. Remapped by ANARE (Australian National Antarctic Research Expeditions), 1957–60, and named by Antarctic Names Committee of Australia (ANCA) for F.A. Smith, diesel mechanic at Mawson Station, 1957.

== Dunlop Peak ==
Dunlop Peak (67°57′S 62°28′E) is one of the Smith Peaks, 1,330 m, standing 1 nautical mile (1.9 km) south of Mount Hordern in the David Range, Framnes Mountains. Mapped by Norwegian cartographers from air photos taken by the Lars Christensen Expedition, 1936–37. Named by Antarctic Names Committee of Australia (ANCA) for R. Dunlop, cosmic ray physicist at Mawson station in 1959.
