= Bypass Nunatak =

Bypass Nunatak (68°1′S 62°28′E) is a nunatak about 2 nautical miles (4 km) south of Mount Tritoppen in the David Range of the Framnes Mountains. It was mapped by Norwegian cartographers from air photos taken by the Lars Christensen Expedition (1936–37) and called "Steinen" (the stone). It was renamed by the Australian National Antarctic Research Expeditions (ANARE) because the feature marked the turning point in the route taken by the 1958 ANARE seismic party in order to bypass dangerous terrain to the southwest.
