= Mount Lawrence =

Mount Lawrence in Antarctika.

Mount Lawrence (67°51′S 62°31′E) is a peak, 1,230 metres (4,040 ft) high, just north of Mount Coates in the David Range of the Framnes Mountains, Mac. Robertson Land, Antarctica. It was mapped by Norwegian cartographers from air photos taken by the Lars Christensen Expedition, 1936–37, and was named by the Antarctic Names Committee of Australia for J. Lawrence, a diesel mechanic at Mawson Station in 1959.
