= McNair Nunatak =

Geological formation

McNair Nunatak (67°52′S 63°23′E) is a small, clearly defined rock exposure in Antarctica, situated 12 nautical miles (22 km) east of the central part of the Masson Range and 5 nautical miles (9 km) south-southeast of Russell Nunatak. It was first seen by R. Dovers during the Australian National Antarctic Research Expeditions southern journey of 1954, and was named by the Antarctic Names Committee of Australia for Richard McNair, a cook at Mawson Station in 1955.
