= Forbes Glacier =

Forbes Glacier may refer to:

- Forbes Glacier (Graham Land)
- Forbes Glacier (Mac. Robertson Land)
- Forbes Glacier (New Zealand)
