= Simpson Ridge =

Simpson Ridge (68°6′S 62°23′E) is an isolated, sharp, serrated ridge situated 1 nautical mile (1.9 km) south of Mount Twintop in the Framnes Mountains, Mac. Robertson Land. Mapped from ANARE (Australian National Antarctic Research Expeditions) surveys, 1954–62. Named by Antarctic Names Committee of Australia (ANCA) for C.R. Simpson, electronics engineer at Mawson Station in 1967.
