= Mount Parsons =

Mountain in Antarctica

Mount Parsons (67°47′S 62°35′E) is a prominent pointed peak, 1,120 m, standing in the David Range, 1 nautical mile (1.9 km) south-southwest of its north extremity. Mapped by Norwegian cartographers from aerial photos taken by the Lars Christensen Expedition, 1936–37. The peak was visited in January 1956 by an ANARE (Australian National Antarctic Research Expeditions) party led by John Bechervaise. Named by Antarctic Names Committee of Australia (ANCA) for Neville Parsons, cosmic ray physicist at Mawson Station, 1955.
