= Mount Coates =

Mount Coates may refer to:

- Mount Coates (Mac. Robertson Land)
- Mount Coates (Victoria Land)
