= Forbes Glacier (Mac. Robertson Land) =

Glacier in Antarctica

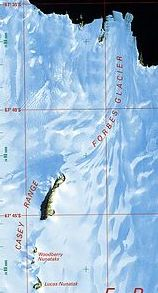
- 1997 satellite image

- Location within Antarctica
- Location: Mac. Robertson Land
- Coordinates: 67°39′S 62°22′E
- Thickness: unknown
- Terminus: Holme Bay
- Status: unknown

Forbes Glacier (67°39′S 62°22′E) is a glacier entering the west part of Holme Bay on Mawson Coast, to the north of the Casey Range, in the Framnes Mountains of Antarctica.

== Exploration ==
The glacier was mapped by Norwegian cartographers from aerial photographs taken by the Lars Christensen Expedition (1936–37) and called "Brygga" (the wharf). It was renamed by the Australian Antarctic Names and Medals Committee after A. Forbes of the Australian National Antarctic Research Expeditions, who perished on a field trip at Heard Island in 1952.

== Origin ==
The Forbes Glacier originates on the east of the Casey Range, about 25 kilometres (16 mi) south of the Holme Bay coast. Tributaries flow east and north through the nunataks of the range, and join into a stream of ice about 5 kilometres (3.1 mi) wide. In the uppermost part of the glacier near the Casey Range the ice in the center of the glacier travels north at 59 metres (194 ft) per year. The area east of the Casey Range has fine-grained ice with a polygonal texture in the zone between the accumulation and ablation areas.

== Mouth ==
The Forbes Glacier enters the sea between two rocky outcrops. That on the east has no flora, but that on the west contains a large, high outcrop of typical granite of the Mawson area with nine species of lichen and one of moss (Bryum antarcticum).

== See also ==
- List of glaciers in the Antarctic
- Glaciology

== Sources ==
- Filson, Rex B. (1966), The Lichens and Mosses of Mac. Robertson Land (PDF), Antarctic Division, Department of External Affairs Australia
- "Forbes Glacier", Geographic Names Information System, United States Geological Survey, United States Department of the Interior This article incorporates public domain material from "Forbes Glacier". Geographic Names Information System. United States Geological Survey.
- Koshiro Kizaki (1969), "Fabric Analysis of Surface Ice near Casey Range, East Antarctica", Journal of Glaciology, 8 (54), Cambridge University Press
