= Mount Tritoppen =

Mountain in Antarctica

Mount Tritoppen (67°59′S 62°29′E) is a triple-peaked mountain, 1,350 m, standing 3 nautical miles (6 km) south of Mount Hordern in the David Range of the Framnes Mountains. Mapped by Norwegian cartographers from aerial photographs taken by the Lars Christensen Expedition, 1936–37, and named Tritoppen (the three-peaked mountain).
