= Russell Nunatak =

Russell Nunatak (67°47′S 63°19′E) is a solitary rounded nunatak 10 nautical miles (18 km) east of the Masson Range and 7 nautical miles (13 km) southeast of Mount Henderson. Discovered in December 1954 by an ANARE (Australian National Antarctic Research Expeditions) party led by R. Dovers and named by Antarctic Names Committee of Australia (ANCA) for John Russell, engineer at Mawson Station, 1954.
