= Painted Peak =

Mountain in Antarctica

- Painted Hill
- Location within Antarctica

Highest point
- Elevation: 710-metre (2,330 ft)
- Coordinates: 67°45′S 62°51′E

Dimensions
- Length: 1.5-kilometre (0.93 mi)
- Width: 0.5-kilometre (0.31 mi)

Geography
- Location: Antarctica
- Region: Mac. Robertson Land

Painted Peak, also called Painted Hill, (67°45′S 62°51′E) is a prominent peak, 710-metre (2,330 ft), on the northern end of the North Masson Range in the Framnes Mountains, Mac. Robertson Land. It was aerially photographed in 1936-1937 and later mapped from these photos by Norwegian cartographers in 1946. It was first visited by an ANARE team in 1955. The ANCA named it for its prominent red-brown coloring. USACAN accepted the name in 1965. It was used as a tellurometer station in 1962.

== Geology ==
Painted Peak is the type locality for "Painted Gneiss". At this location the gneiss is about 300-metre (980 ft) thick, but this thickness may be partly due to folding. The Painted Gneiss is a sequence of garnet- and biotite-bearing felsic gneiss, interlayered with calc-silicates, migmatitic garnet+sillimanite+cordierite-bearing metapelites and quartz+feldspar+magnetite gneiss. At Painted Mountain, the Painted Gneiss occurs as an isolated roof pendants within the late Proterozoic Mawson Charnockite. The Mawson Charnockite is an extensive batholith of plutonic igneous rock that has intruded the metasedimentary strata that comprises the Painted Gneiss. The latter occurs as isolated xenoliths and roof pendants, of which Painted Mountain is the largest, within the charnockite. The Mawson Charnockite was syntectonically metamorphosed into orthogneiss. It outcrops throughout the Framnes Mountains and as far west as Chapman Ridge.

== Biology ==
Lichens found on Painted Peak include:

- Acarospora gwynnii
- Acarospora wiliamsii
- Biatorella antarctica
- Buellia frigida
- Buellia aff. subpedicellata
- Protoblasienia citrina
- Lecanora rubina var. melanophthalma f. exulans
- Lecanora expectans
- Lecidea phillipsiana
- Rhizocarpon flavum
- Omphalodiscus decussatus
- Alectoria minuscules
