= Poulton Peak =

Mountain in Antarctica

Poulton Peak (68°2′S 63°2′E) is the highest point on the elongated rock ridge in the northeast part of Blanabbane Nunataks, in Mac. Robertson Land. The peak has the appearance of a rock cairn and was used as an unoccupied trigonometrical station by Australian National Antarctic Research Expeditions surveyor M.J. Corry in 1965. It was named by Antarctic Names Committee of Australia for M.A. Poulton, weather observer at Mawson Station that year.
