= Fischer Nunatak =

Nunatak in Mac. Robertson Land, Antarctica

- Location within Antarctica

Highest point
- Elevation: 750 m (2,460 ft)
- Coordinates: 67°44′S 63°3′E

Geography
- Location: Antarctica
- Region: Mac. Robertson Land

Fischer Nunatak (67°44′S 63°3′E) is a nunatak, 750 metres (2,460 ft) high, standing 2 nautical miles (4 km) south of Mount Henderson in the northeast part of the Framnes Mountains, Mac. Robertson Land, Antarctica.

== Discovery ==
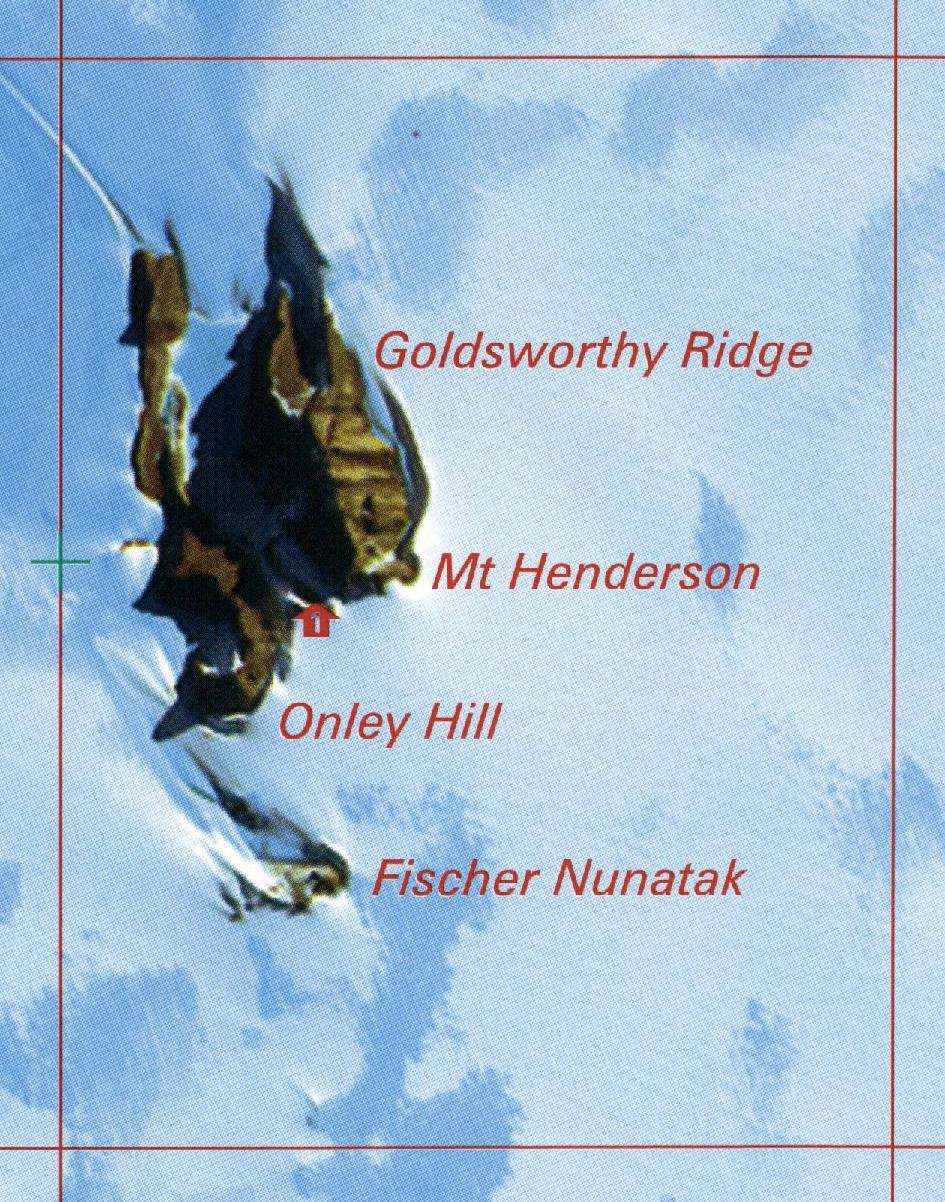
Satellite image map of Mount Henderson

Fischer Nunatak was mapped by Norwegian cartographers from air photos taken by the Lars Christensen Expedition, 1936–37, and named "Sornuten" (the south peak). It was renamed by the Australian National Antarctic Research Expeditions (ANARE) for H.J.L. Fischer, cook at Mawson Station in 1958. In 1954 a barge caravan was used as a remote weather station on the nunatak. It was removed in 1989.

== Appearance ==
Fischer Nunatak is about 1.5 kilometres (0.93 mi) south of Mount Henderson, and has similar geology to Mount Henderson. It is about 750 metres (2,460 ft) high, with an area of exposed rock that covers about 1 square kilometre (0.39 sq mi). There is a broad valley to the south of the nunatak. As of 1998 the ice surrounding the nunatak had many crevasses. The nunatak has a long, smooth slope that is ideal for downhill skiing during the rare periods when there is enough snow cover.

== Plant life ==
A botanical survey of Fischer Nunatak Fischer Nunatak in 1962 by ANARE based at Mawson Station found eight species of lichen and one species of moss, Grimmia lawiana. The nunatak has very different lichen fauna from Mount Henderson. On the south side there is plentiful Biatorella antarctica. The west side has abundant Buellia lignoides and Rhizocarpon flavum, neither of which is found on Mount Henderson. A specimen of Umbilicaria decussata collected on the nunatak is preserved in the Royal Botanic Gardens Victoria.

== Sources ==
- Alberts, Fred G., ed. (1995), Geographic Names of the Antarctic (PDF) (2 ed.), United States Board on Geographic Names This article incorporates public domain material from websites or documents of the United States Board on Geographic Names.
- Filson, Rex B. (1966), The Lichens and Mosses of Mac. Robertson Land (PDF), Antarctic Division, Department of External Affairs Australia
- Ingrid (10 October 1998), "A close-call with an ice crevasse", ABC Science
- Mackie, Ian (2017), Recipient of the Phillip Law Medal 2017 – Dave McCormack AAM, Anare Club
- Manning, John (February 2018), Anniversary Nunataks Survey January 1968
- Preserved specimen of Umbilicaria decussata (Vill.) Zahlbr. recorded on 1974-02-06, Royal Botanic Gardens Victoria
