= Central Masson Range =

Mountain range in Antarctica

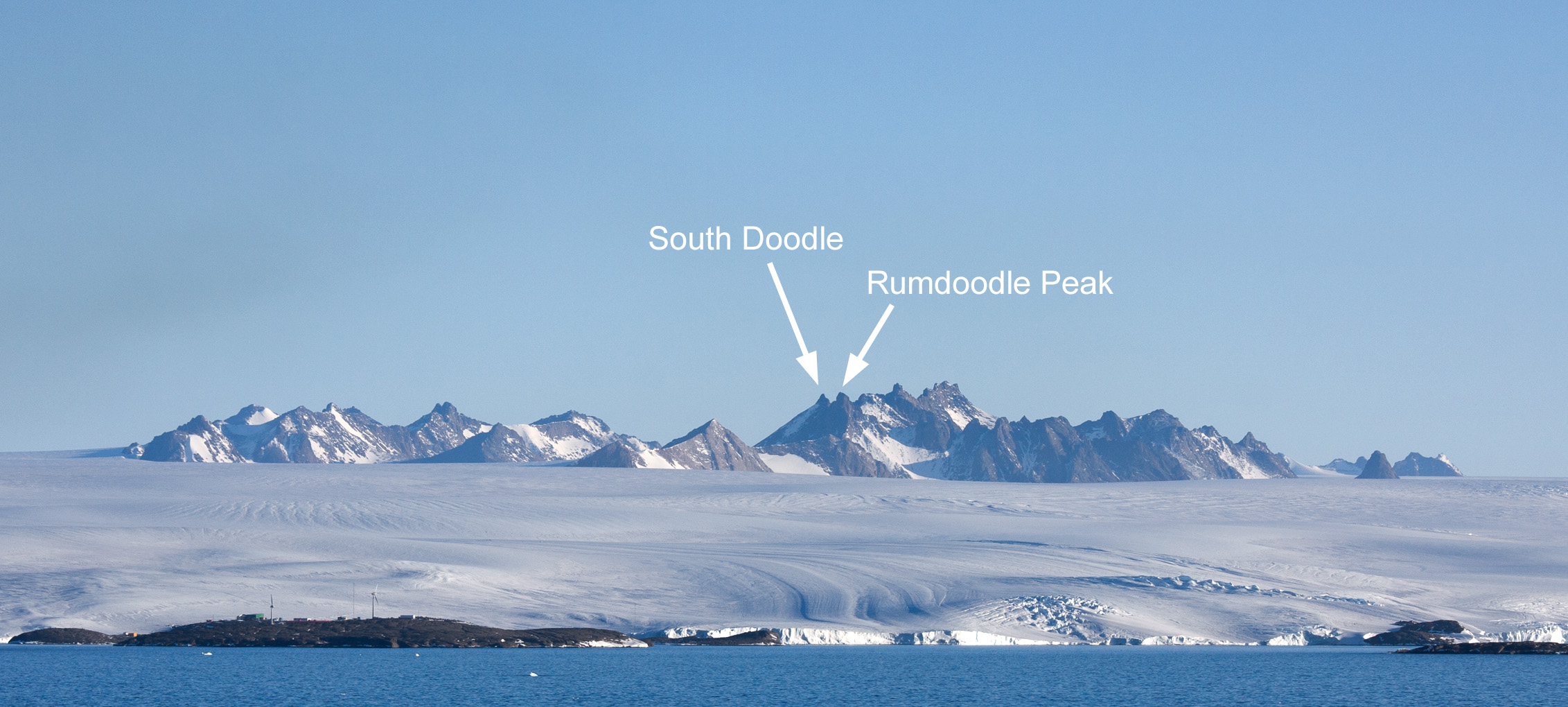
- Northern and Central Massons from sea

Highest point
- Elevation: 1,190 m (3,900 ft)
- Coordinates: 67°50′S 62°52′E

Geography
- Location within Antarctica
- Location: Antarctica
- Region: Mac. Robertson Land

The Central Masson Range (67°50′S 62°52′E) is the central segment of the three parts of the Masson Range, Antarctica. It rises to 1,120 metres (3,670 ft) and extends 4 nautical miles (7 km) in a north–south direction.

== Physical ==
The Central Masson Range is to the east and south of the North Masson Range. Blair Peak (960 metres (3,150 ft) at its northern end is a nunatak that is separate from the main massif. The northern part of this range has similar geology and structure to the North Masson Range.

== Botany ==
Lichen collected at the north end of the main mass and 3 kilometres (1.9 mi) south included twelve fairly plentiful species of lichen, notably Rhizocarpon flavium.

== Exploration ==
The Masson Range was discovered and named by the British Australian and New Zealand Antarctic Research Expedition, 1929–31, under Douglas Mawson. This central range was mapped by Norwegian cartographers from air photos taken by the Lars Christensen Expedition, 1936–37, and named "Mekammen" (the middle comb or crest). The approved name, suggested by the Antarctic Names Committee of Australia in 1960, more clearly identifies the feature as a part of Masson Range.

== Features ==
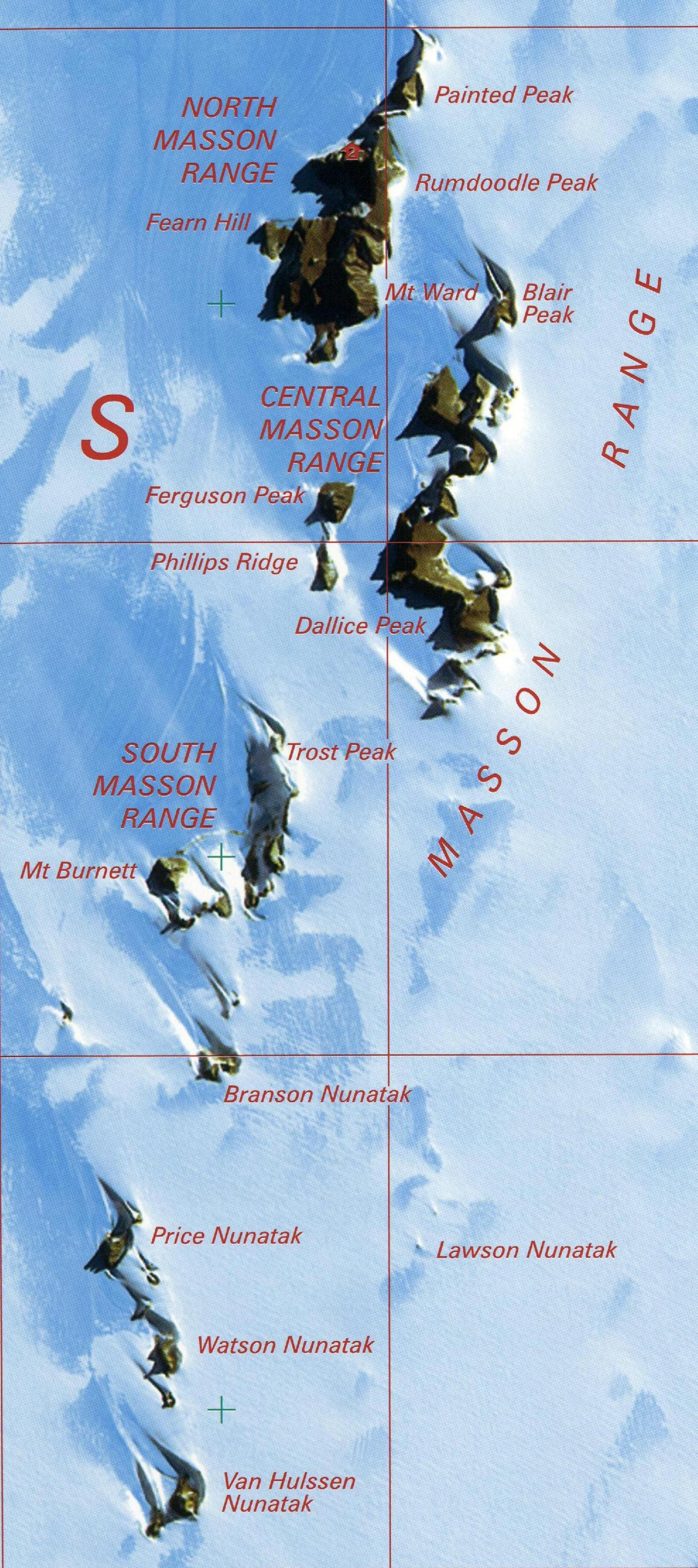
Masson Mountains (upper and center) and Trilling Peaks (lower)

Features include:

=== Blair Peak ===
67°48′S 62°53′E. Sharp peak, 960 metres (3,150 ft), situated 2 miles (3.2 km) southeast of Rumdoodle Peak in the Masson Range of the Framnes Mountains. Mapped by Norwegian cartographers from aerial photographs taken by the Lars Christensen Expedition, 1936-37. Remapped by ANARE, 1957-60, and named for James Blair, senior diesel mechanic at Mawson Station, 1958. Blair Peak stands apart from the other mountains in the Masson and David ranges, and from its summit gives a panoramic view of these ranges.

=== Ferguson Peak ===
67°49′36.5″S 62°48′42.8″E Altitude 900 metres (3,000 ft). A peak about 1 kilometre (0.62 mi) west of the main massif of the Central Masson Range, Mac.Robertson Land, just north of Phillips Ridge. Named after O Ferguson, senior technician (electronics) at Mawson in 1962.

=== Phillips Ridge ===
67°50′S 62°49′E. Ridge, 0.5 miles (0.80 km) long, standing 0.5 miles (0.80 km) west of the main massif of the Central Masson Range in the Framnes Mountains, Mac. Robertson Land. Mapped by Norwegian cartographers from air photos taken by the.Lars Christensen Expedition, 1936-37. Named by ANCA for J. Phillips, physicist at Mawson Station in 1962.

=== Dallice Peak ===
The highest peak of the Central Masson Range, near its southern end. The peak, 1,190 metres (3,900 ft) above sea level, rises from a high ridge and is not very prominent. Named for Dalice Trost, daughter of Peter A Trost, physicist at Mawson in 1958. (Note: The minutes of the meeting of July 1959 incorrectly spelt her name as Dallice. This wasn't picked up until May 2018. The name appears on many maps and has been adopted by other countries, so it couldn't be corrected.)

== Sources ==
- Alberts, Fred G., ed. (1995), Geographic Names of the Antarctic (PDF) (2 ed.), United States Board on Geographic Names This article incorporates public domain material from websites or documents of the United States Board on Geographic Names.
- Bumak, Jim (27 March 2009), Rumdoodle - Postcards from Antarctica, ABC
- "Dallice Peak", Gazetteer, Australian Antarctic Data Centre
- "Ferguson Peak", Gazetteer, Australian Antarctic Data Centre
- Filson, Rex B. (1966), The Lichens and Mosses of Mac. Robertson Land (PDF), Antarctic Division, Department of External Affairs Australia
- Framnes Mountains Satellite Image Map, Australian Antarctic Data Centre
