= Venture Dome =

Ice dome in Antarctica

Venture Dome (68°36′S 62°13′E) is a large, heavily crevassed ice dome about 30 nautical miles (60 km) south of Mount Twintop in Mac. Robertson Land. The feature had been seen by several parties traveling south from Mawson Station since 1957, but it had been avoided. In 1967, ANARE (Australian National Antarctic Research Expeditions) surveyor J. Manning selected a route through the crevasses and established a beaconed tellurometer station on it. So named by ANARE to indicate the risk taken in crossing the dome.
