= Mount Coates (Mac. Robertson Land) =

Mountain in Antarctica

Mount Coates (67°52′S 62°31′E) is a peak, 1,280 metres (4,200 ft) high, just south of Mount Lawrence in the David Range of the Framnes Mountains. It was discovered and named in February 1931 by the British Australian New Zealand Antarctic Research Expedition under Mawson.
