= Brown Range =

Mountain range in Antarctica

- Location within Antarctica

Highest point
- Coordinates: 68°08′S 62°24′E

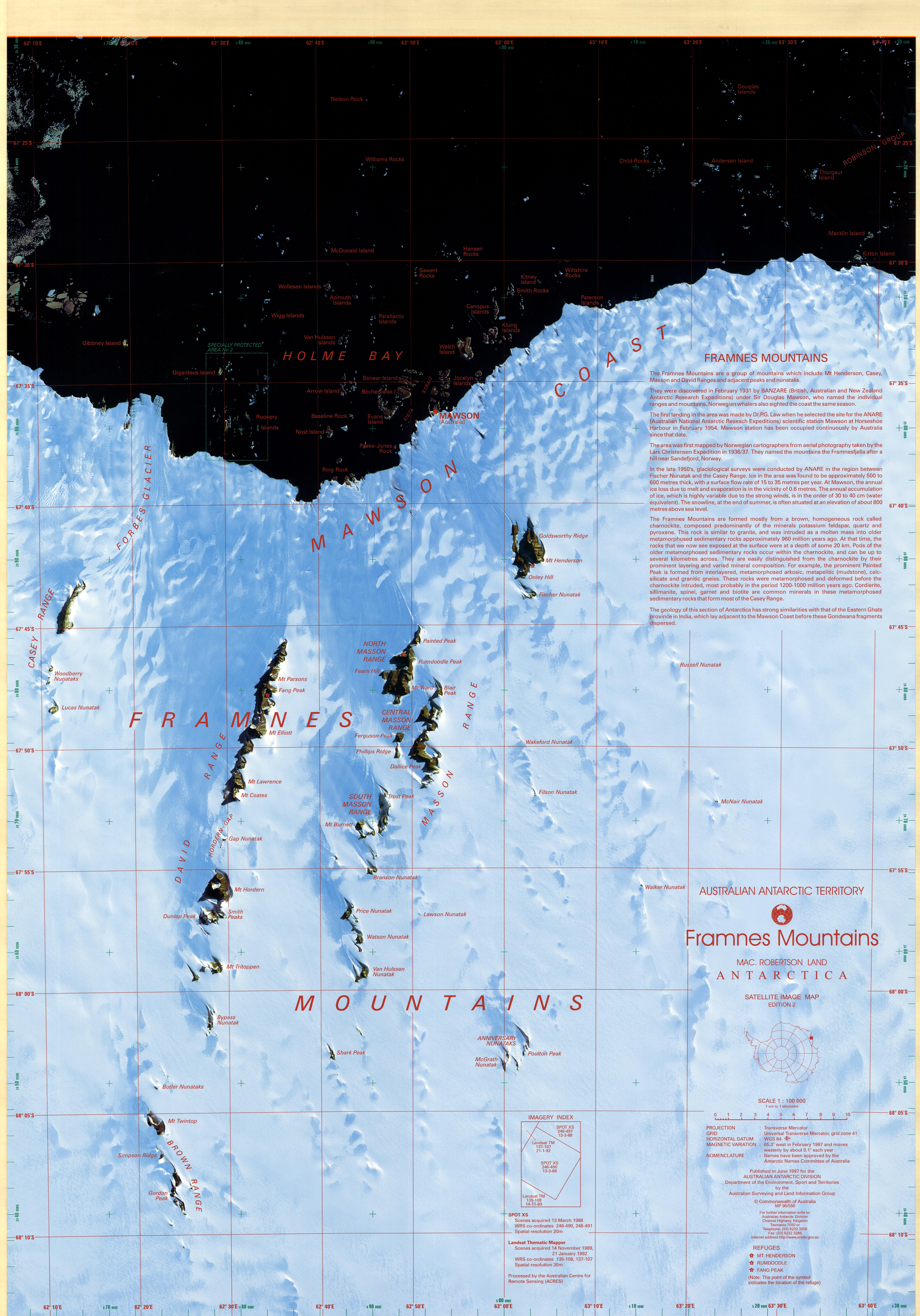
1:100,000 satellite image map of the Framnes Mountains. Brown Range to the southwest (lower left)

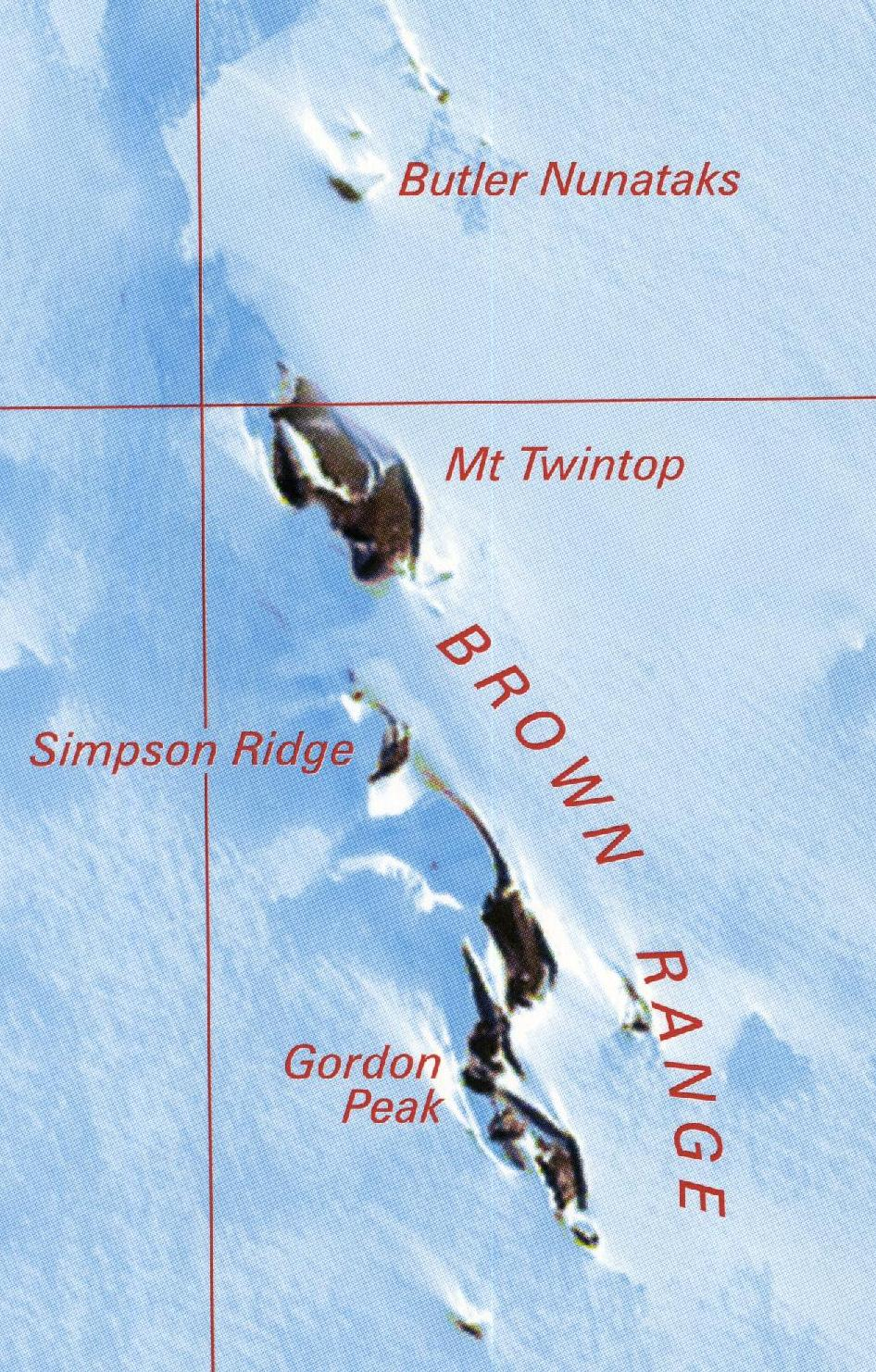
Brown Range

The Brown Range or Sørtindane Peaks (Note: The United States Board on Geographic Names insists the name is Sørtindane Peaks, and not Brown Range or Gory Sørtindane.) (68°08′S 62°24′E) is a group of seven peaks in the Framnes Mountains about four kilometres (2.5 mi) south of Mount Twintop in Mac. Robertson Land, Antarctica.

== Exploration ==
Norwegian cartographers mapped two of the peaks from aerial photographs taken by the Lars Christensen Expedition in 1936, and named them the Sørtindane (South Mountain) Peaks. They are named for D. A. Brown, who was a radio operator at Mawson Station in 1958.

== Description ==
The Framnes Mountains have elevations up to 1,500 metres (4,900 ft) above sea level, and rise up to 400 metres (1,300 ft) above the ice surface. They have dark, weathered charnockite bedrock that is littered with light-colored quartz-rich, granitic gneiss glacial erratics. The Brown Range is about 50 kilometres (31 mi) inland. During the late Quaternary the ice sheet thickened by about 160 metres (520 ft) at the Brown Range.

== Features ==
=== Simpson Ridge ===
68°06′S 62°23′E. An isolated, sharp, serrated ridge situated 1 mile (1.6 km) south of Mount Twintop in the Framnes Mountains, Mac. Robertson Land. Mapped from ANARE surveys, 1954-62. Named by ANCA for C.R. Simpson, electronics engineer at Mawson Station in 1967.

=== Gordon Peak ===
Gordon Peak (68°08′49″S 62°24′49.8″E) is in the center of the Brown Range and is its the highest peak at about 1,484 metres (4,869 ft) above sea level. The two main peaks in this range were plotted by Norwegian cartographers from air photographs taken by the Lars Christensen Expedition (1936). Gordon Peak was used as an unoccupied Trigonometrical station by Max J. Corry, surveyor at Mawson in 1965. It is named for P.J. Gordon, radio technician at Mawson Station in 1965.

== Sources ==
- Alberts, Fred G., ed. (1995), Geographic Names of the Antarctic (PDF) (2 ed.), United States Board on Geographic Names This article incorporates public domain material from websites or documents of the United States Board on Geographic Names.
- "Brown Range", Gazeteer, Australian Antarctic Data Centre
- "Gordon Peak", Gazetteer, Australian Antarctic Data Centre
- Mackintosh, Andrew N.; Verleyen, Elie; O'Brien, Philip E.; White, Duanne A. (15 September 2014), "Retreat history of the East Antarctic Ice Sheet since the Last Glacial Maximum", Quaternary Science Reviews, 100: 10–30
