= Van Hulssen Nunatak =

Van Hulssen Nunatak (67°59′S 62°45′E) is a nunatak at the south end of the Trilling Peaks in the Framnes Mountains, Mac. Robertson Land, Antarctica. It was mapped by Norwegian cartographers from air photos taken by the Lars Christensen Expedition, 1936–37, and was named by the Antarctic Names Committee of Australia (ANCA) for Frits Van Hulssen, a technical officer (ionosphere) at Mawson Station in 1959.
