= Blånabbane Nunataks =

The Blånabbane Nunataks (68°2′S 63°1′E) are a small group of nunataks about 15 nautical miles (30 km) east of Mount Twintop in Mac. Robertson Land. They were mapped and named by Norwegian cartographers working from air photos taken by the Lars Christensen Expedition, 1936–37.

== See also ==
- Poulton Peak
