= Mount Henderson (Holme Bay) =

Mountain in the Framnes Mountains of Mac. Robertson Land in Antarctica

- Location within Antarctica

Highest point
- Elevation: 970 m (3,180 ft)
- Coordinates: 67°42′07″S 63°03′32″E

Geography
- Location: Antarctica
- Region: Mac. Robertson Land

Mount Henderson (67°42′S 63°04′E) is a mountain in the Framnes Mountains of Mac. Robertson Land in the Antarctic. It is southeast of Holme Bay and northeast of the Masson Range.

== Physical ==
Mount Henderson is a massive mountain rising through the ice sheet 5 miles (8.0 km) southeast of Holme Bay and a like distance northeast of the north end of the Masson Range. The mountain is about 13 kilometres (8.1 mi) south-southeast of Mawson Station. The rocky massif covers about 4 by 2 kilometres (2.5 by 1.2 mi). Its ridges rise to about 970 metres (3,180 ft) above sea level.

There are large areas of moraine and moraine scree slopes, and large melt lakes between the ridges. Glacial erratic boulders of light-colored granitic gneiss cover the lower slopes of the mountain, but are not found more than about 250 metres (820 ft) above the present-day ice surface. Above this level the darker charnockite bedrock is exposed. Probably the boulders were transported and deposited by ice during the last glacial maximum, while the exposed bedrock would have remained above the ice.

== Botany ==
Thirteen species of lichen and one of moss (Grimmia lawiana) have been collected in the Mount Henderson area. On the scree slope below Goldsworthy ridge at an elevation of about 522 metres (1,713 ft) there is abundant lichen and moss. Buellia frigida is the most common lichen, extending deep into sheltered crevices between rocks in association with Xanthoria mawsonii and Protoblastenia citrina. There are large patches of Caloplaca elegans. On the southeast corner of the massif there are dense cushions of Biatorella antarctica, which is also plentiful on the summit, as are Buellia frigida and Caloplaca elegans var. pulvinata. The lichen Gasparrinia harrisoni has been found growing on Mount Henderson less than 2 metres (6 ft 7 in) from the line where the ice meets the rock. Patches of this lichen were found in places where there is little direct sunlight at any time of the year, and where the rock is usually very dry.

== Exploration ==
Mount Henderson was seen for the first time from the crow's nest of the Discovery on 3 January 1930, during the British Australian and New Zealand Antarctic Research Expedition (BANZARE) (1929–31). It was seen again from the airplane on 5 January 1930. The mountain was visited in February 1931 by BANZARE under Douglas Mawson, who named it after W. Henderson, Director of the Australian Department of External Affairs and a member of the Australian Antarctic Committee, 1929.

== Features ==
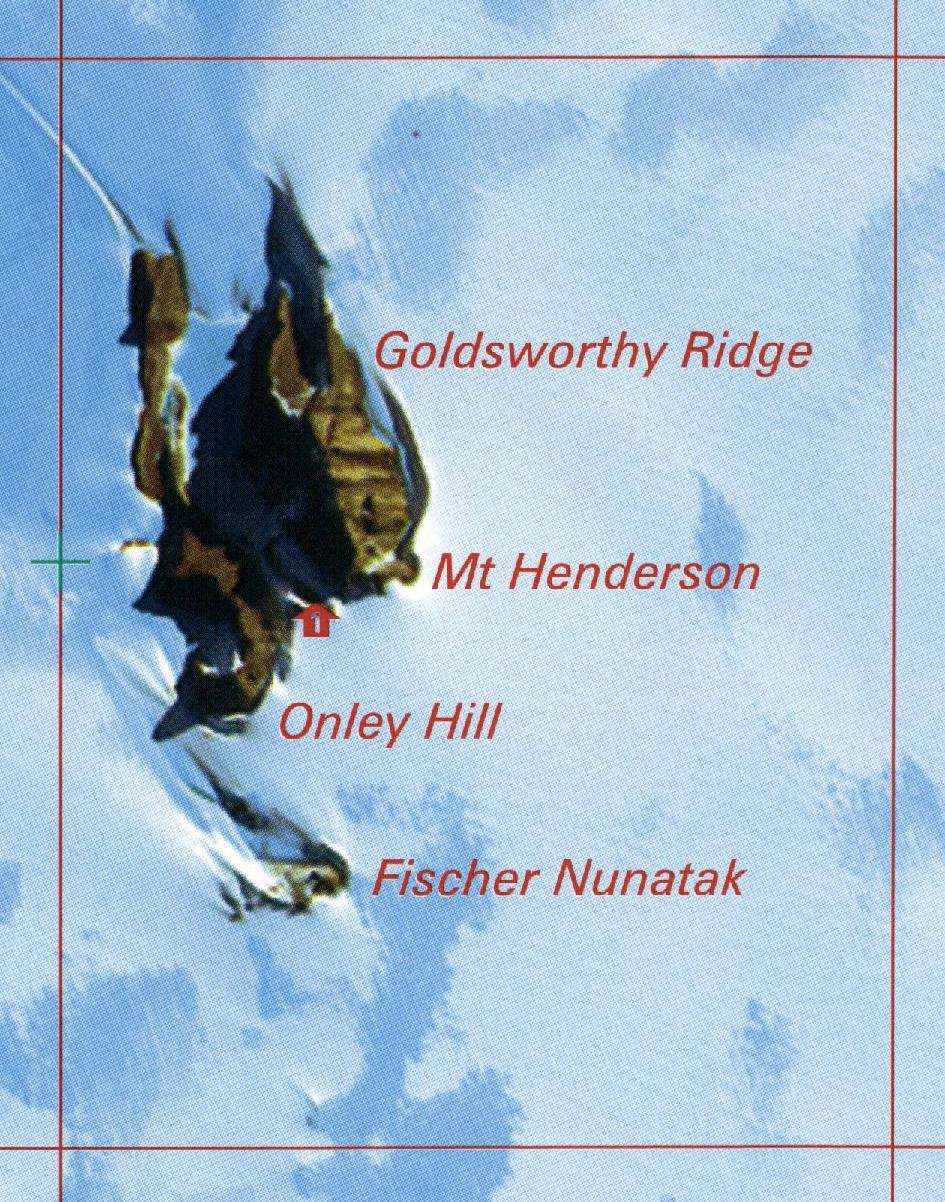
Satellite image map of Mount Henderson

Features include the Goldsworthy Ridge in the north, Onley Hill in the south, and Fischer Nunatak south of the massif.

=== Goldsworthy Ridge ===
67°41′S 63°03′E. Ridge extending north from Mount Henderson in the northeast part of the Framnes Mountains, Mac. Robertson Land. Mapped by Norwegian cartographers from air photos taken by the Lars Christensen Expedition, 1936-37. Named by ANCA for R.W. Goldsworthy, survey field assistant with ANARE (Nella Dan) in 1962.

=== Onley Hill ===
67°43′S 63°02′E. A bare rock hill, 840 metres (2,760 ft), standing 1 mile (1.6 km) south of Mount Henderson in the northeast part of the Framnes Mountains, Mac. Robertson Land. Mapped by Norwegian cartographers from air photos taken by the Lars Christensen Expedition, 1936-37, and named Sorkollen (the south knoll). Renamed by Antarctic Names Committee of Australia (ANCA) for L. Onley, weather observer at Mawson Station in 1959. Not: Sorkollen.

=== Fischer Nunatak ===
67°44′S 63°03′E. Nunatak, 750 m, standing 2 mi S of Mount Henderson in the NE part of the Framnes Mountains, Mac. Robertson Land. Mapped by Norwegian cartographers from air photos taken by the Lars Christensen Expedition, 1936-37, and named Sornuten (the south peak). Renamed by ANARE for H.J.L. Fischer, cook at Mawson Station in 1958. Not: Fisher Nunatak, Somuten.

== Sources ==
- Alberts, Fred G., ed. (1995), Geographic Names of the Antarctic (PDF) (2 ed.), United States Board on Geographic Names This article incorporates public domain material from websites or documents of the United States Board on Geographic Names.
- Filson, Rex B. (1966), The Lichens and Mosses of Mac. Robertson Land (PDF), Antarctic Division, Department of External Affairs Australia
- Framnes Mountains Satellite Image Map, Australian Antarctic Data Centre
- Mackintosh, Andrew; White, Duanne; Fink, David; Gore, Damian (June 2007), "Exposure ages from mountain dipsticks in Mac. Robertson Land, East Antarctica, indicate little change in ice-sheet thickness since the Last Glacial Maximum", Geology, 35 (6), doi:10.1130/G23503A.1
- Mellor, Malcolm (June 1959), "Variations of the Ice Margins in East Antarctica", The Geographical Journal, 125 (2): 230–235, doi:10.2307/1790506
- Mount Henderson, Australian Antarctic Data Centre
