= Price Nunatak =

Nunatak in the Framnes Mountains, Mac. Robertson Land, Antarctica

Price Nunatak (67°57′S 62°43′E) is a nunatak marking the north end of the Trilling Peaks, 3 nautical miles (6 km) south of Mount Burnett in the Framnes Mountains, Mac. Robertson Land. Mapped by Norwegian cartographers from air photos taken by the Lars Christensen Expedition, 1936–37. Named by Antarctic Names Committee of Australia (ANCA) for H. Price, senior diesel mechanic at Mawson Station in 1959.
