= Mount Twintop =

Mountain in Antarctica

Mount Twintop (68°5′S 62°22′E) is a twin-peaked mountain about 6 nautical miles (11 km) south-southwest of Mount Tritoppen in the south part of the David Range, Framnes Mountains. Immediately north of Mount Twintop are the Butler Nunataks, and Venture Dome lies 60 km to the south.

Mapped by Norwegian cartographers from air photos taken by the Lars Christensen Expedition (1936–37) and named Tvitoppen (the twin peak). The translated form of the name recommended by Antarctic Names Committee of Australia (ANCA) has been adopted.

== See also ==
- List of mountains of East Antarctica
