= Trilling Peaks =

Mountains in Antarctica

- Location within Antarctica

Highest point
- Coordinates: 67°58′S 62°45′E

Trilling Peaks (67°58′S 62°45′E) is a group of linear nunataks, comprising three main peaks standing three miles south of South Masson Range in the Framnes Mountains, Mac. Robertson Land.

== Exploration ==
Trilling Peaks was mapped by Norwegian cartographers from air photos taken by the Lars Christensen Expedition, 1936-37, and named Trillingnutane (the triplet peaks). Not: Trillingnutane. (Note: Filson (1966) includes the Price Nunatak and other nunataks to the south in the South Masson Range. We follow Alberts (1995) in treating these nunataks as part of the separate Trilling Peaks.)

== Features ==
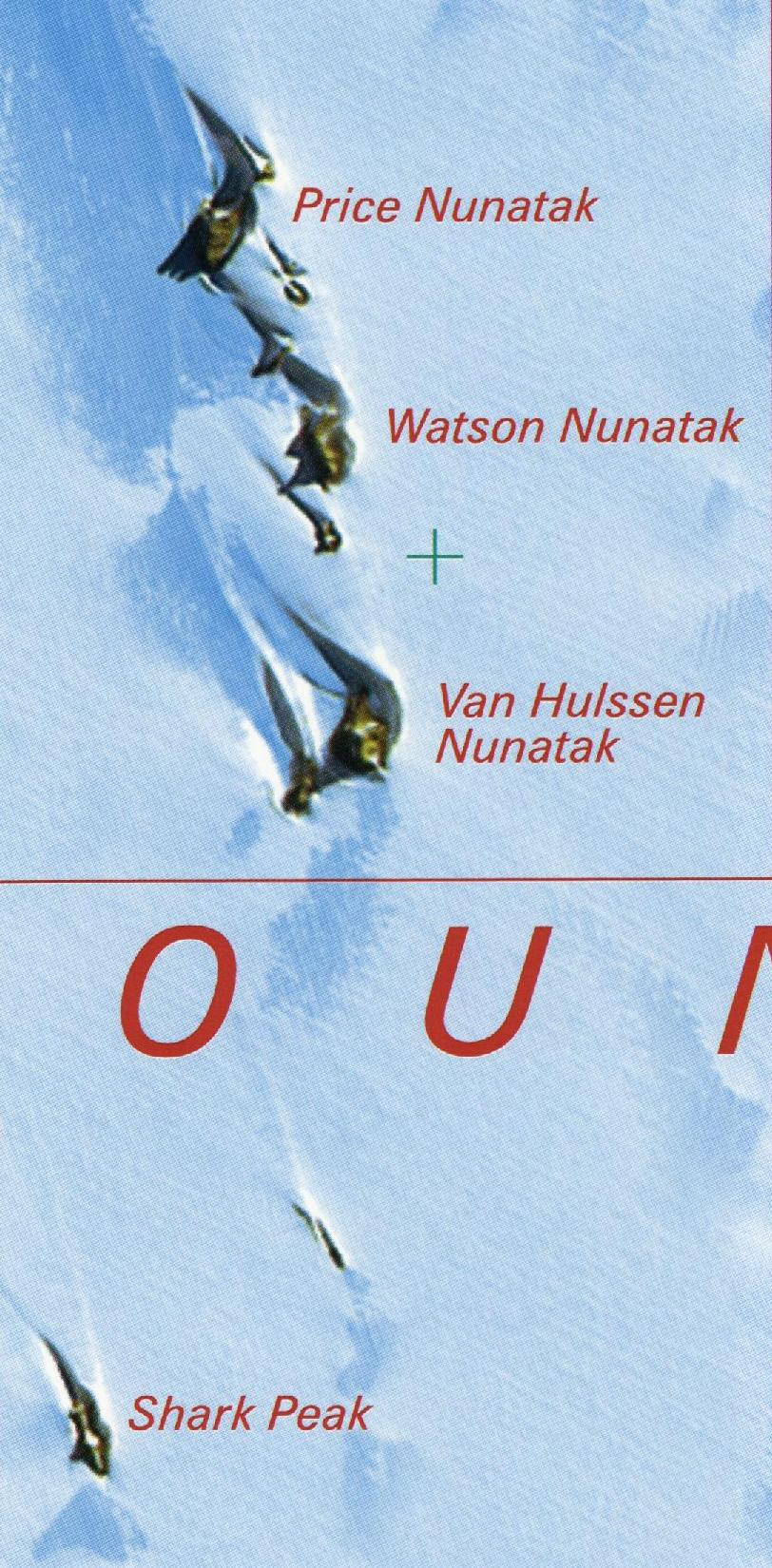
Trilling Peaks and Shark Peak

Features include:

=== Price Nunatak ===
67°57′S 62°43′E. Nunatak marking the north end of the Trilling Peaks, 3 miles (4.8 km) south of Mount Burnett in the Framnes Mountains, Mac. Robertson Land. Mapped by Norwegian cartographers from air photos taken by the Lars Christensen Expedition, 1936-37. Named by ANCA for H. Price, senior diesel mechanic at Mawson Station in 1959. Price Nunatak has an elevation of about 1,170 metres (3,840 ft). It has two peaks, with a deep wind scour between them. The northern peak has a variable lichen flora.

=== Watson Nunatak ===
67°58′S 62°45′E. Nunatak standing between Price and Van Hulssen Nunataks in the Trilling Peaks, Framnes Mountains, in Mac. Robertson Land. Mapped by Norwegian cartographers from air photos taken by the Lars Christensen Expedition, 1936-37. Named by ANCA for K.D. Watson, diesel mechanic at Mawson Station, who assisted in the Framnes Mountains Depot Peak survey by AN ARE in 1965.

=== Van Hulssen Nunatak ===
67°59′S 62°45′E. Nunatak at the south end of the Trilling Peaks in the Framnes Mountains, Mac. Robertson Land. Mapped by Norwegian cartographers from air photos taken by the Lars Christensen Expedition, 1936-37. Named by ANCA for F. Van Hulssen, technical officer (ionosphere) at Mawson Station in 1959. Van Hulssen Nunatak has an elevation of about 1,330 metres (4,360 ft). Lichens have been collected on the southern faces of the nunatak and on the western scree slopes.

== Sources ==
- Alberts, Fred G., ed. (1995), Geographic Names of the Antarctic (PDF) (2 ed.), United States Board on Geographic Names This article incorporates public domain material from websites or documents of the United States Board on Geographic Names.
- Filson, Rex B. (1966), The Lichens and Mosses of Mac. Robertson Land (PDF), Antarctic Division, Department of External Affairs Australia
- Framnes Mountains Satellite Image Map, Australian Antarctic Data Centre
