= North Masson Range =

Mountain range in Antarctica

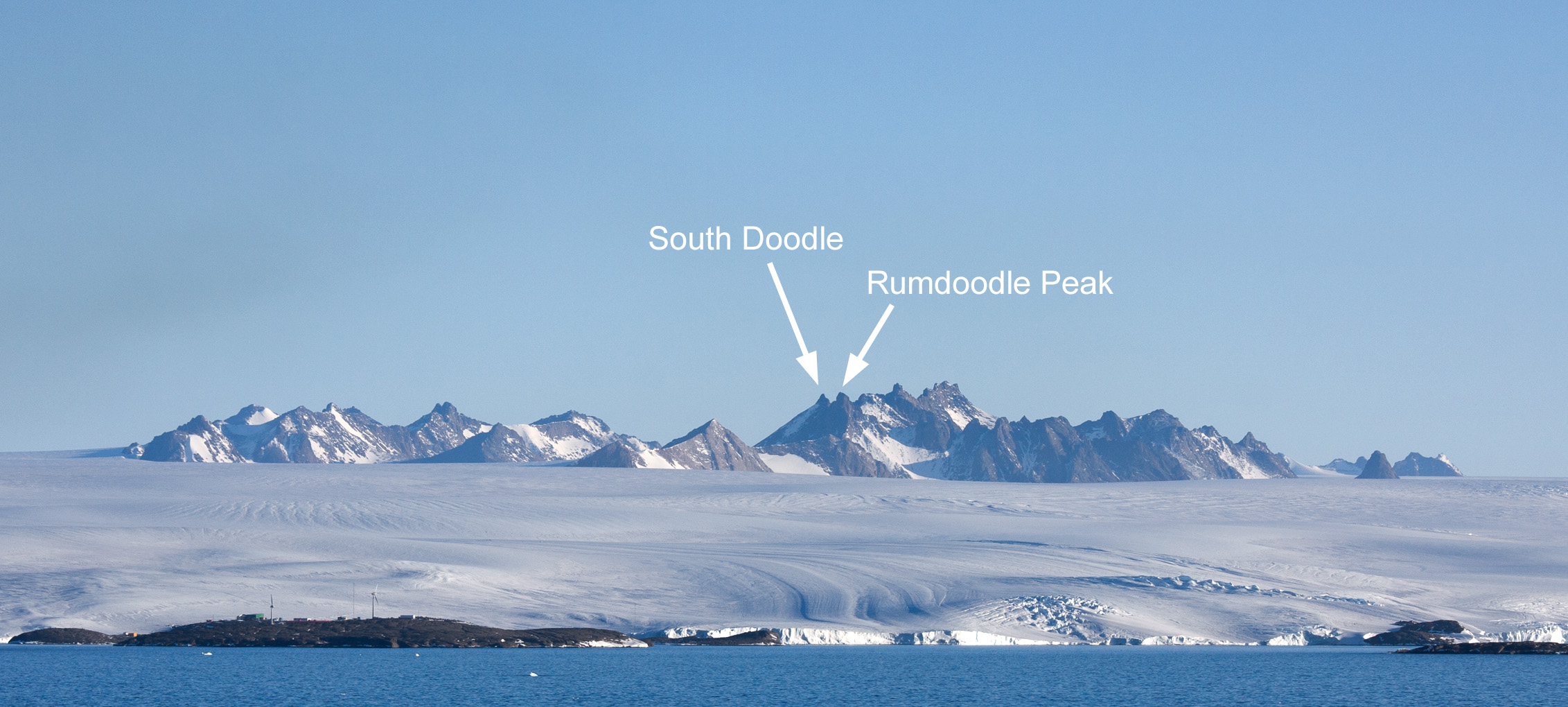
- Northern and Central Massons from sea

Highest point
- Elevation: 1,030 m (3,380 ft)
- Coordinates: 67°47′S 62°49′E

Geography
- Location within Antarctica
- Location: Antarctica
- Region: Mac. Robertson Land

North Masson Range (67°47′S 62°49′E) is part of the Masson Range, which is divided into three parts of which this segment is the northern, rising to 1,030 metres (3,380 ft) and extending 3 miles (4.8 km) in a north–south direction.

== Physical ==
The North Masson Range covers an area of about 6.5 by 3 kilometres (4.0 by 1.9 mi). Its highest point is Mount Ward at 1,030 metres (3,380 ft) above sea level. Most of the rocks are similar to those at Mawson Station, but the northern tip is made of metamorphosed sediments. Painted Peak in the northern tip is banded with different layers of sediments. There are plentiful lichens in the range, including very large Omphalodiscus antarcticus specimens growing in crevices in rocks upwards from near the surface of the melt lakes. There are moraine and scree slopes along the foot of the range which divide the melt lakes. A long line of moraine extends along the flow lines for 5 to 6 kilometres (3.1 to 3.7 mi) northward toward the coast. All the moraine boulders carry a wide variety of lichens.

== Exploration ==
The Masson Range was discovered and named by British Australian New Zealand Antarctic Research Expedition (BANZARE), 1929–31, under Mawson. This northern range was mapped by Norwegian cartographers from air photos taken by the Lars Christensen Expedition, 1936–37, and named Nordkammen (the north comb or crest). The approved name, suggested by Antarctic Names Committee of Australia (ANCA) in 1960, more clearly identifies the feature as a part of Masson Range.

== Features ==
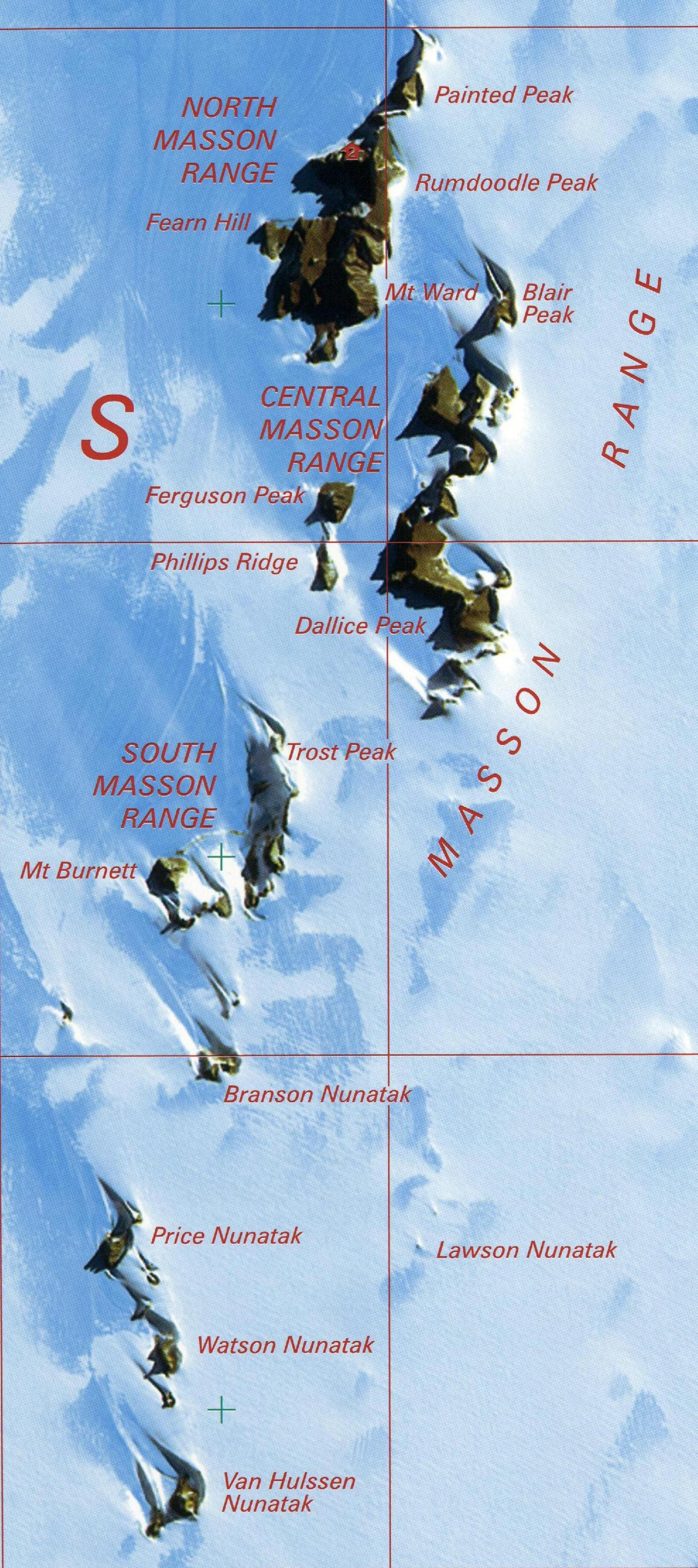
Masson Mountains (upper and center) and Trilling Peaks (lower)

Features include:

=== Painted Peak ===
67°45′S 62°51′E. Prominent peak, 710 metres (2,330 ft), on the northern spur of the North Masson Range in the Framnes Mountains, Mac. Robertson Land. Mapped by Norwegian cartographers from air photos taken by the Lars Christensen Expedition, 1936-37. Visited by an ANARE party in 1955, and so named because of its conspicuous red-brown coloring. Not: Painted Hill.

=== Rumdoodle Peak ===
67°46′S 62°50′E. Prominent peak 1 mile (1.6 km) southwest of Painted Peak in the North Masson Range, Mac. Robertson Land. Mapped by Norwegian cartographers from air photos taken by the Lars Christensen Expedition, 1936-37. The name is associated with "Rumdoodle Air Strip," which the peak overlooks. Rumdoodle was the name of a fictional mountain in a novel Ascent of Rumdoodle by W.E. Bowman, and since 1960 has been used locally by Mawson Station personnel for the air strip.

=== Mount Ward ===
67°47′17.9″S 62°49′05.2″E. Altitude 975.6 metres (3,201 ft). An isolated peak, 976 metres (3,202 ft) above sea level, in the southern part of the North Masson Range in Mac.Robertson Land. Discovered by Sir Douglas Mawson in 1930. Climbed by an ANARE party led by John Béchervaise in January 1956. Named for J.L. Ward, radio operator at Mawson in 1955.

=== Lake Lorna ===
67°47′08.5″S 62°47′19.2″E. Altitude 522 metres (1,713 ft). A small meltwater lake between Fearn Hill and Mount Ward in the North Masson Range, Mac.Robertson Land. Discovered in 1956 by an ANARE Party led by John M. Béchervaise. Named for Lorna, wife of John M. Béchervaise, Officer-in-Charge at Mawson in 1955 and 1959.

=== Fearn Hill ===
67°46′56.3″S 62°46′58.4″E. Altitude 715.5 metres (2,347 ft). A small, detached, conical hill about 2 kilometres (1.2 mi) north-west of Mount Ward in the North Masson Range. It is separated from main massif by a small col containing a glacial lake (Lake Lorna). The peak is clearly visible standing out from the main massif to parties using the corridor between the Masson and David Ranges. Discovered and climbed for the first time in January 1956 by an ANARE party led by J.M. Béchervaise. Named after the wife of John Béchervaise, Officer-in-Charge at Mawson Station in 1955 and 1959.

== Sources ==
- Alberts, Fred G., ed. (1995), Geographic Names of the Antarctic (PDF) (2 ed.), United States Board on Geographic Names This article incorporates public domain material from websites or documents of the United States Board on Geographic Names.
- "Fearn Hill", Gazetteer, Australian Antarctic Data Centre
- Filson, Rex B. (1966), The Lichens and Mosses of Mac. Robertson Land (PDF), Antarctic Division, Department of External Affairs Australia
- Framnes Mountains Satellite Image Map, Australian Antarctic Data Centre
- "Lake Lorna", Gazetteer, Australian Antarctic Data Centre
- "Mount Ward", COMPOSITE GAZETTEER OF ANTARCTICA, Scientific Committee on Antarctic Research (SCAR)
