= Casey Range =

Antarctic mountain range

- Location within Antarctica

Highest point
- Elevation: 957 m (3,140 ft)
- Coordinates: 67°47′S 62°12′E

Casey Range is a jagged, razor-backed ridge and a few nunataks in a line extending north–south, standing 8 miles (13 km) west of David Range, in the Framnes Mountains. It was discovered by the British Australian and New Zealand Antarctic Research Expedition (BANZARE), 1929–31, under Douglas Mawson, who named it for Rt. Hon. Richard G. Casey.

== Appearance ==
The Casey Range is about 9.5 kilometres (5.9 mi) long. The main mass is in the north of the range, rising to a height of about 950 metres (3,120 ft), and extending for about 4 kilometres (2.5 mi). Further south, separated from the northern mass by a gap of about 2.5 kilometres (1.6 mi), there is a group of nunataks. These include the Lucas Ridge and the Woodberry Nunataks.

According to the 1960 Sailing Directions for Antarctica:

The Casey Range lies parallel to the David Range and about 10 miles further westward. It is not so rugged and broken as the ranges further eastward. The northern part is a dark ridge about 2,800 feet high- About 5 miles southward another ridge rises to about 3,100 feet and stretches southward for a distance of about 10 miles. About 25 miles westward of the Casey Range are a number of prominent detached peaks.

== Geology ==
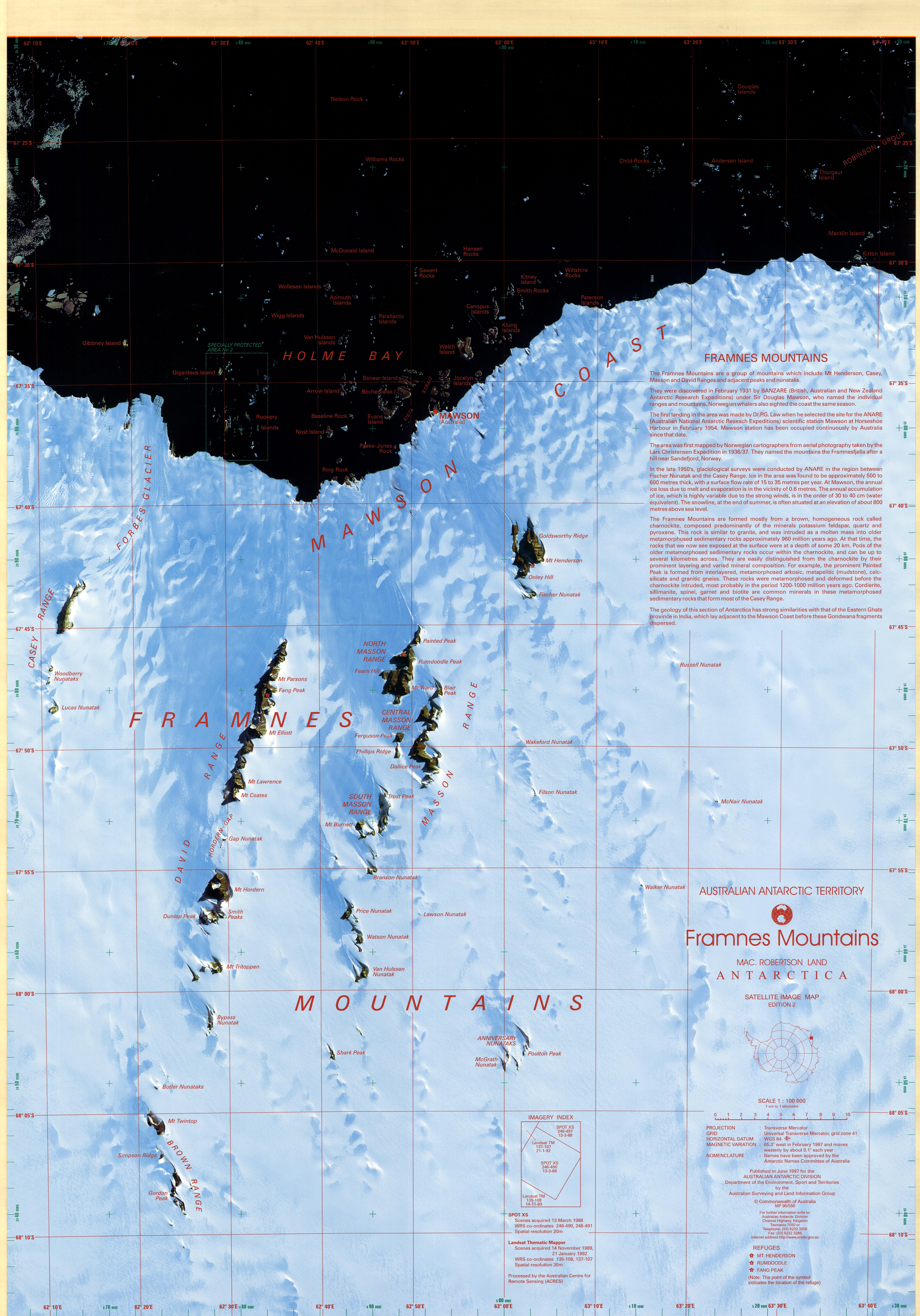
Satellite image map of Framnes Mountains. Casey Range to the west (left)

The Casey Range consists of prominent north-south strike ridges. The slopes dip steeply to the east, and are precipitous to the west. The north of the range has fairly open folding, while there is much tighter folding on Lucas Nunatak in the south.

The geology of the Framnes Mountains as a whole is very similar to that of the Eastern Ghats in India, which lay beside the Mawson Coast before Gondwana broke up. The mountains are mostly formed of charnockite, a homogeneous brown rock similar to granite that mainly consists of potassium feldspar, quartz and pyroxene. These rocks were formed about 960 million years ago at a depth of about 20 kilometres (12 mi) as a molten mass within older metamorphosed sedimentary rocks. The charnockite contains pods of the metamorphosed sedimentary rocks as much as 20 kilometres (12 mi) wide, including most of the Casey Range.

The rock types of the Casey range are not found elsewhere in the Mac.Robertson Land. Crohn refers to the rocks as "metasediment". Throughout the range there are outcroppings of finely banded rock composed of sillimanite, garnet, pyroxene, quartz and feldspar gneiss. The bands of alternating light and dark rock are up to 0.5 metres (1 ft 8 in) thick. In the north there are equal amounts of light and dark rocks, but to the south there is a higher proportion of dark rock. Garnet is uncommon in the north of the range, but is the main component of the dark bands in parts of Lucas Nunatak. Between 80% and 90% of the range is composed of pyroxene-quartz-feldspar gneiss. There are also bands from 0.5 to 6 metres (1 ft 8 in to 19 ft 8 in) thick of fine- to medium-grained garnetiferous quartzite, small pyroxene lenses and quartz-feldspar pegmatite.

== Botany ==
In the northern mass Biatorella antarctica is the most common lichen. Lecidea woodberryi has also been found, as well as many other lichen species.

== Features ==
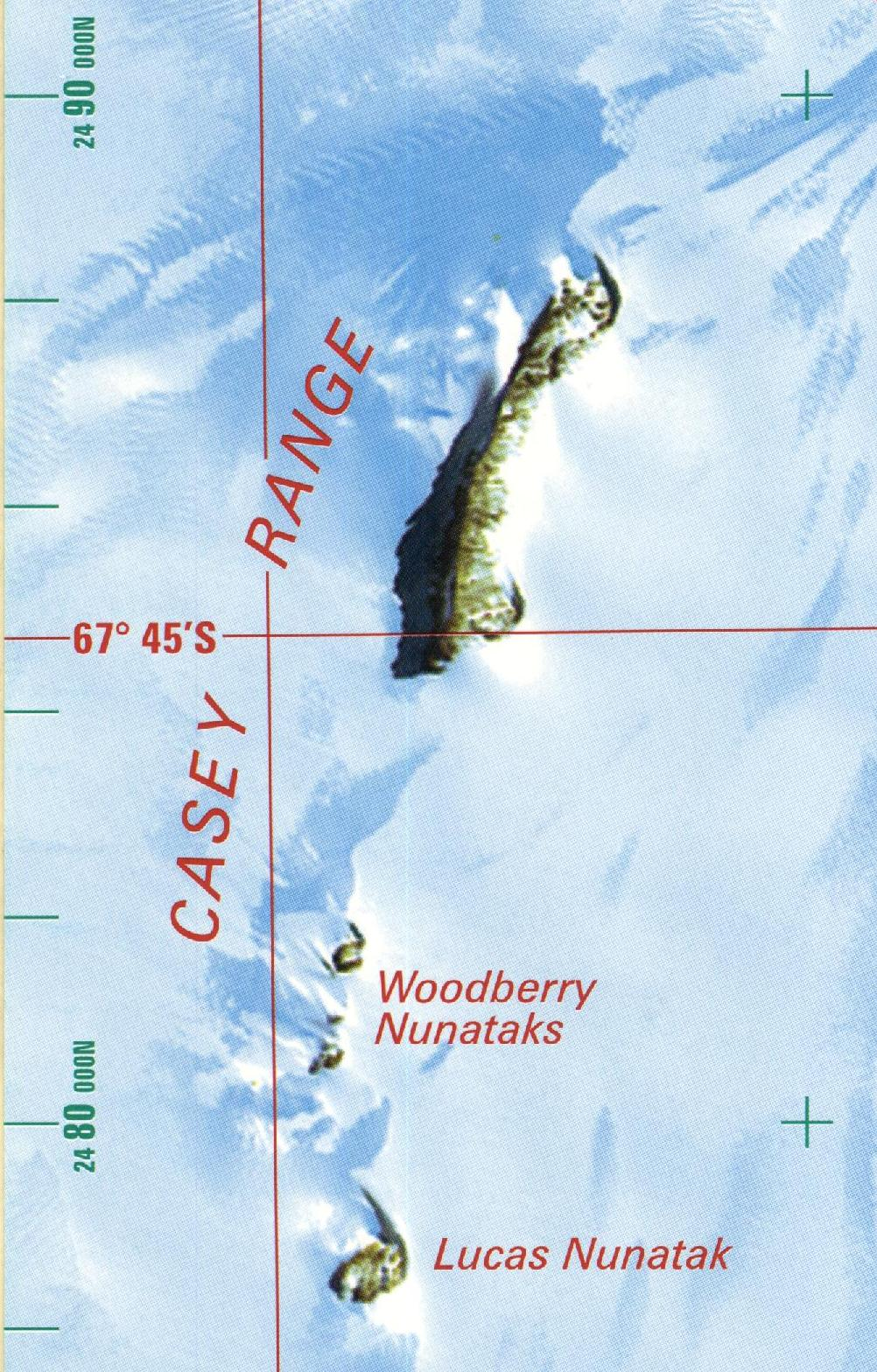
Satellite image map of Casey Range

=== Forbes Glacier ===
The Forbes Glacier originates on the east of the Casey Range, about 25 kilometres (16 mi) south of the Holme Bay coast. Tributaries flow east and north through the nunataks of the range, and join into a stream of ice about 5 kilometres (3.1 mi) wide. In the uppermost part of the glacier near the Casey Range the ice in the center of the glacier travels north at 59 metres (194 ft) per year.

=== Woodberry Nunataks ===
67°47′S 62°11′E. Group of small nunataks 1 mi N of Lucas Nunatak in the Casey Range, Framnes Mountains. Mapped by Norwegian cartographers from air photos taken by the Lars Christensen Expedition, 1936-37. Visited by an ANARE party in 1962 and named for B.D. Woodberry, ionosphere physicist at Mawson Station, a member of the field party.

=== Lucas Nunatak ===
67°48′S 62°11′E. Nunatak 1 mile (1.6 km) south of Woodberry Nunataks in the Casey Range, Framnes Mountains. Mapped by Norwegian cartographers from air photos taken by the Lars Christensen Expedition, 1936-37. Visited by an ANARE party in April 1962. Named by ANCA for P.M. Lucas, officer in charge at Mawson Station in 1962.

== Sources ==
- Alberts, Fred G., ed. (1995), Geographic Names of the Antarctic (PDF) (2 ed.), United States Board on Geographic Names This article incorporates public domain material from websites or documents of the United States Board on Geographic Names.
- Casey Range, Australian Antarctic Data Centre
- Filson, Rex B. (1966), The Lichens and Mosses of Mac. Robertson Land (PDF), Antarctic Division, Department of External Affairs Australiac
- Framnes Mountains Satellite Image Map, Australian Antarctic Data Centre
- Koshiro Kizaki (1969), "Fabric Analysis of Surface Ice near Casey Range, East Antarctica", Journal of Glaciology, 8 (54), Cambridge University Press
- Sailing Directions for Antarctica: Includes Islands South of Latitude 60, United States. Defense Mapping Agency. Hydrographic Center, 1960 This article incorporates public domain material from websites or documents of the United States Defense Mapping Agency.
- Trail, D.S.; McLeod, I.R.; Cook, P.J.; Wallis, G.R. (1967), Geological Investigations by the Australian National Antarctic Research Expeditions, 1965 (PDF), ANARE Scientific Reports, Department of External Affairs Australia
