= Mount Hordern =

Mountain in Antarctica

Mount Hordern (67°56′S 62°29′E) is a peak, 1,510 metres (4,950 ft) high, standing 4 nautical miles (7 km) south of Mount Coates in the David Range of Antarctica. It was discovered in February 1931 by the British Australian New Zealand Antarctic Research Expedition under Mawson, and named for Sir Samuel Hordern, a patron of this expedition and of the Australasian Antarctic Expedition under Mawson, 1911–14.
