= Masson Range =

Mountain range in Antarctica

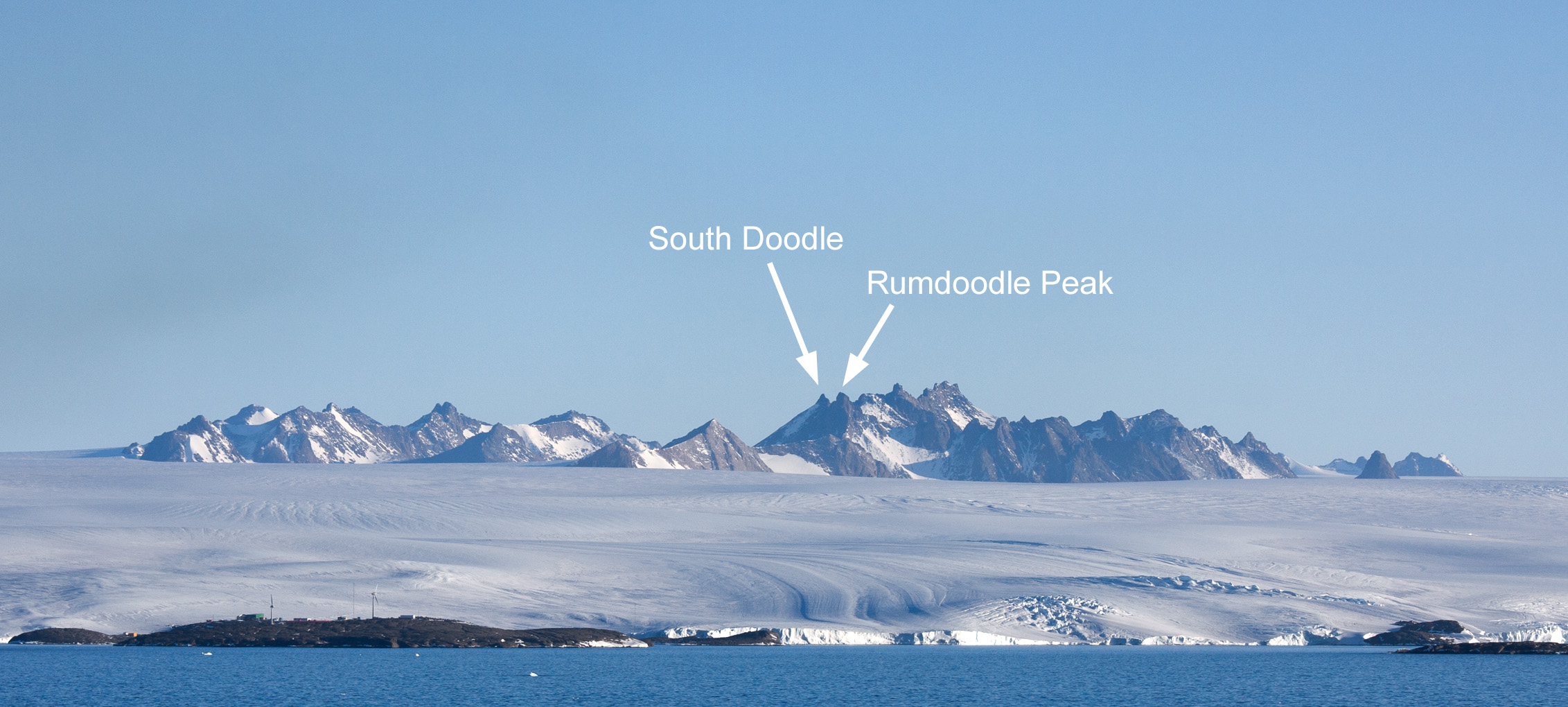
- Northern and Central Massons from sea

Highest point
- Elevation: 1,089.1 m (3,573 ft)
- Coordinates: 67°51′S 62°50′E

Geography
- Location within Antarctica
- Location: Antarctica
- Region: Mac. Robertson Land

The Masson Range is a high broken chain of mountains, consisting primarily of the North Masson, Central Masson and South Masson Ranges, forming a part of the Framnes Mountains.

== Physical ==
The Masson Range has several peaks over 1,000 metres (3,300 ft). The highest point is 1,089.1 metres (3,573 ft). The range is about 16 kilometres (9.9 mi) south of Mawson Station. It extends for about 15 miles (24 km) in a north–south direction. (Note: Alberts (1995) states that the range extends for about 15 miles (24 km) in a north–south direction. Filson (1966) states that the range extends for about 32 kilometres (20 mi) in a south-southwest direction.) The North Masson Range and Central Masson Range are large massifs, and the South Masson Range contains several groups of nunataks.

== Exploration ==
The Masson Range was discovered and charted by the British Australian and New Zealand Antarctic Research Expedition, 1929–31, under Douglas Mawson, and named for Professor Sir David Orme Masson, a member of the Advisory Committee for this expedition as well as the Australasian Antarctic Expedition, 1911–14, also under Mawson. The mountains were first visited by an Australian National Antarctic Research Expeditions party led by John Béchervaise in 1956.

== North Masson Range ==
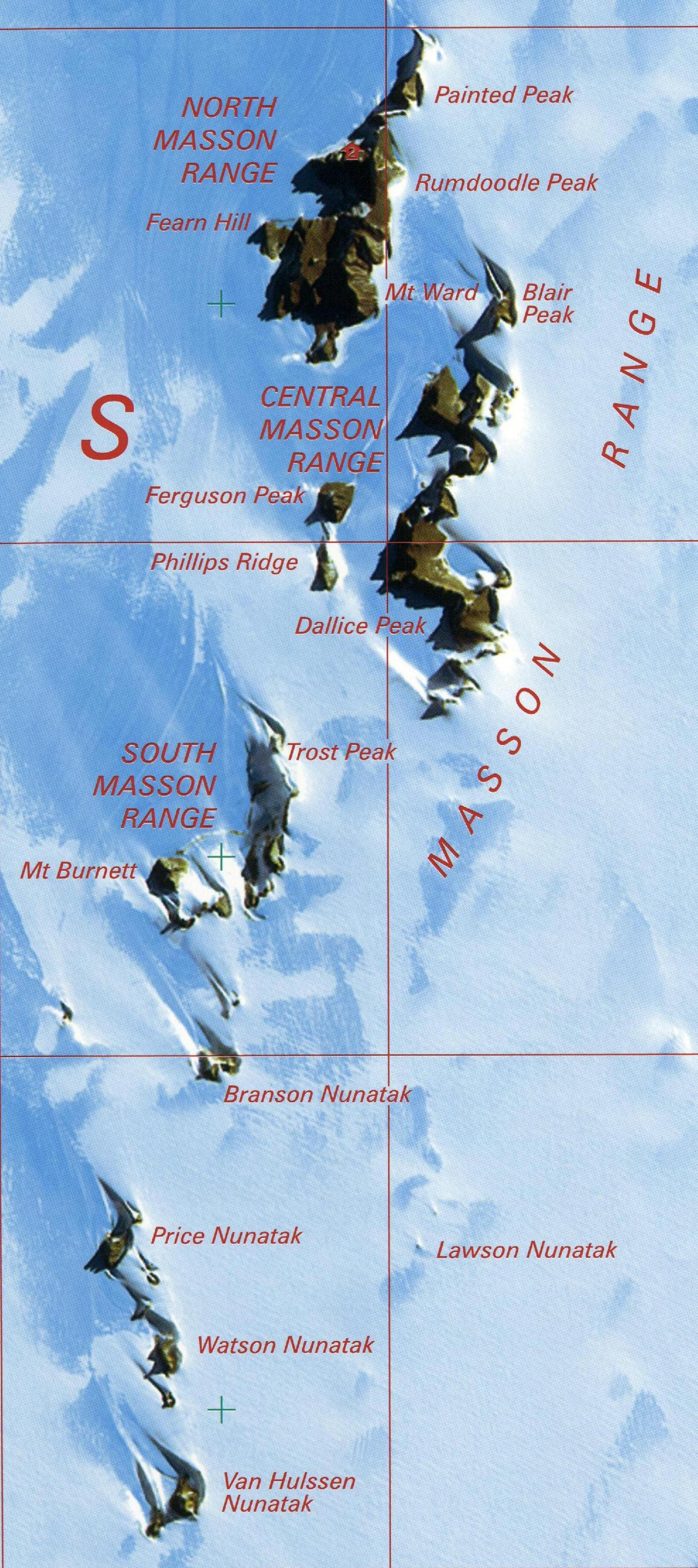
Masson Range (upper and center) and Trilling Peaks (lower)

67°47′S 62°49′E. The Masson Range is divided into three parts of which this segment is the northern, rising to 1,030 metres (3,380 ft) and extending three miles in a north-south direction. The Masson Range was discovered and named by BANZARE, 1929-31, under Mawson. This northern range was mapped by Norwegian cartographers from air photos taken by the Lars Christensen Expedition, 1936-37, and named Nordkammen (the north comb or crest). The approved name, suggested by ANCA in 1960, more clearly identifies the feature as a part of Masson Range. Not: Gora Nurkammen, Nordkammen, Nordkammen Crest, North Crest.

== Central Masson Range ==
67°50′S 62°52′E. The Masson Range is divided into three parts of which this segment is the central, rising to 1,120 metres (3,670 ft) and extending four miles in a north-south direction. The Masson Range was discovered and named by BANZARE, 1929-31, under Mawson. This central range was mapped by Norwegian cartographers from air photos taken by the Lars Christensen Expedition, 1936-37, and named Mekammen (the middle comb or crest). The approved name, suggested by ANCA in 1960, more clearly identifies the feature as a part of Masson Range. Not: Mekammen, Mekammen Crest, Middle Crest.

== South Masson Range ==
67°53′S 62°47′E. The Masson Range is divided into three parts of which this segment is the southern, rising to 1,070 metres (3,510 ft) and extending two miles in a northeast-southwest arc. The Masson Range was discovered and named by BANZARE, 1929-31, under Mawson. This southern range was mapped by Norwegian cartographers from air photos taken by the Lars Christensen Expedition, 1936-37, and named Sörkammen (the south comb or crest). The approved name, suggested by ANCA in 1960, more clearly identifies the feature as a part of Masson Range. Not: Gora Serkammen, Sörkammen, Sørkammen Crest, South Crest. (Note: Filson (1966) includes the Price Nunatak and other nunataks to the south in the South Masson Range. We follow Alberts (1995) in treating these nunataks as part of the separate Trilling Peaks.)

== Sources ==
- Framnes Mountains Satellite Image Map, Australian Antarctic Data Centre
- Alberts, Fred G., ed. (1995), Geographic Names of the Antarctic (PDF) (2 ed.), United States Board on Geographic Names This article incorporates public domain material from websites or documents of the United States Board on Geographic Names.
- Filson, Rex B. (1966), The Lichens and Mosses of Mac. Robertson Land (PDF), Antarctic Division, Department of External Affairs Australia
- "Masson Range", Gazetteer, Australian Antarctic Data Centre
