= David Range =

Mountain range in Antarctica

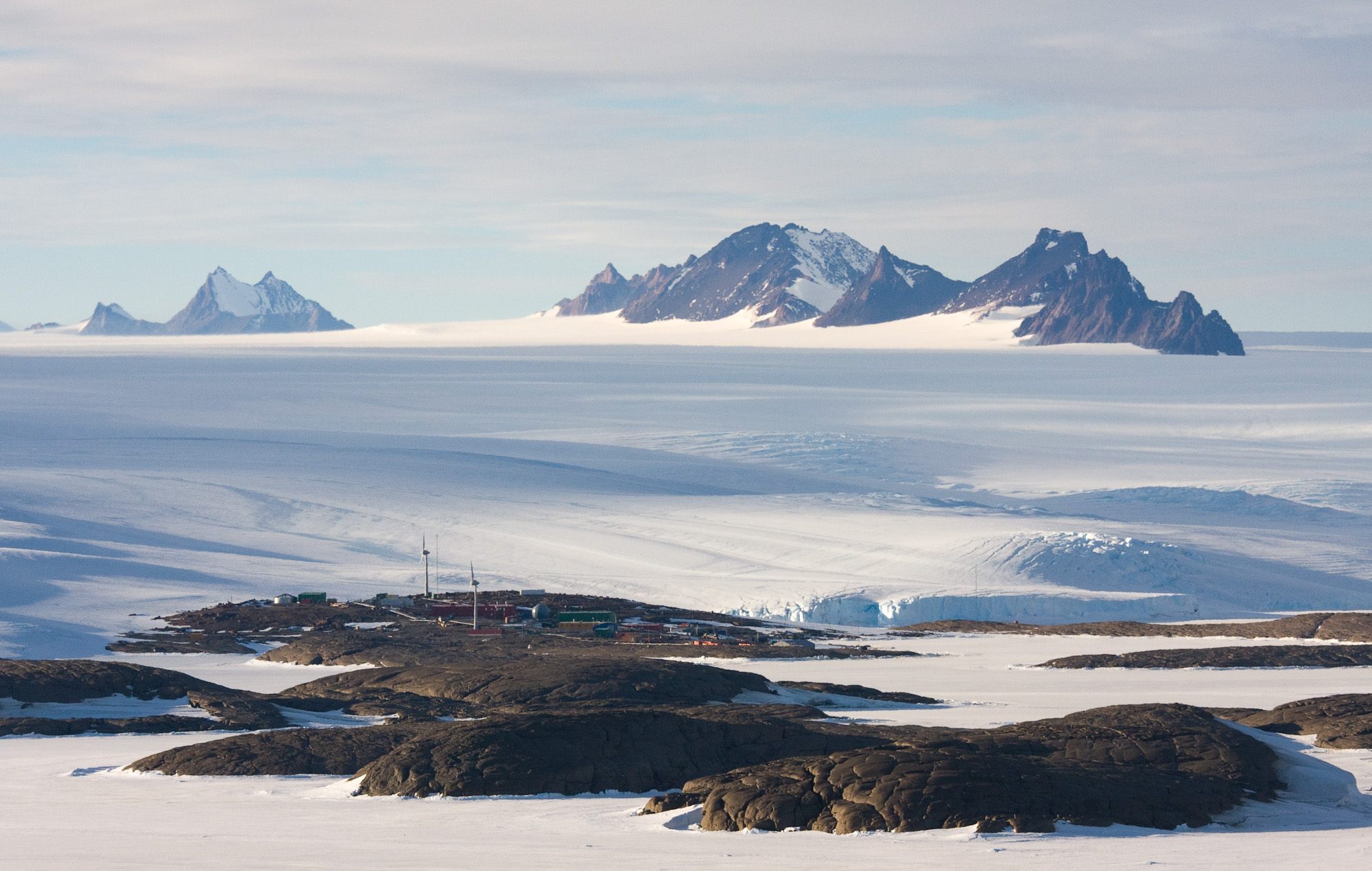
Mawson Station from Welch Island, looking toward the David Range

Location of David Range
Antarctica

The David Range (67°54′S 62°30′E is a mountain range that extends for 26 kilometres (16 mi) in the Framnes Mountains of Mac.Robertson Land in Antarctica. The range is surrounded by, and largely covered by, an ice sheet. Only the peaks are visible.

== Discovery ==
The range was first seen by the British Australian and New Zealand Antarctic Research Expedition (BANZARE) on the evening of 4 January 1930 as a mirage on the horizon. The peaks of the Masson Range and Casey Range were also visible in the mirage. On 14 February 1931 the range was mapped from the Discovery. Sir Douglas Mawson, named the range for Professor Edgeworth David of the BANZARE committee.

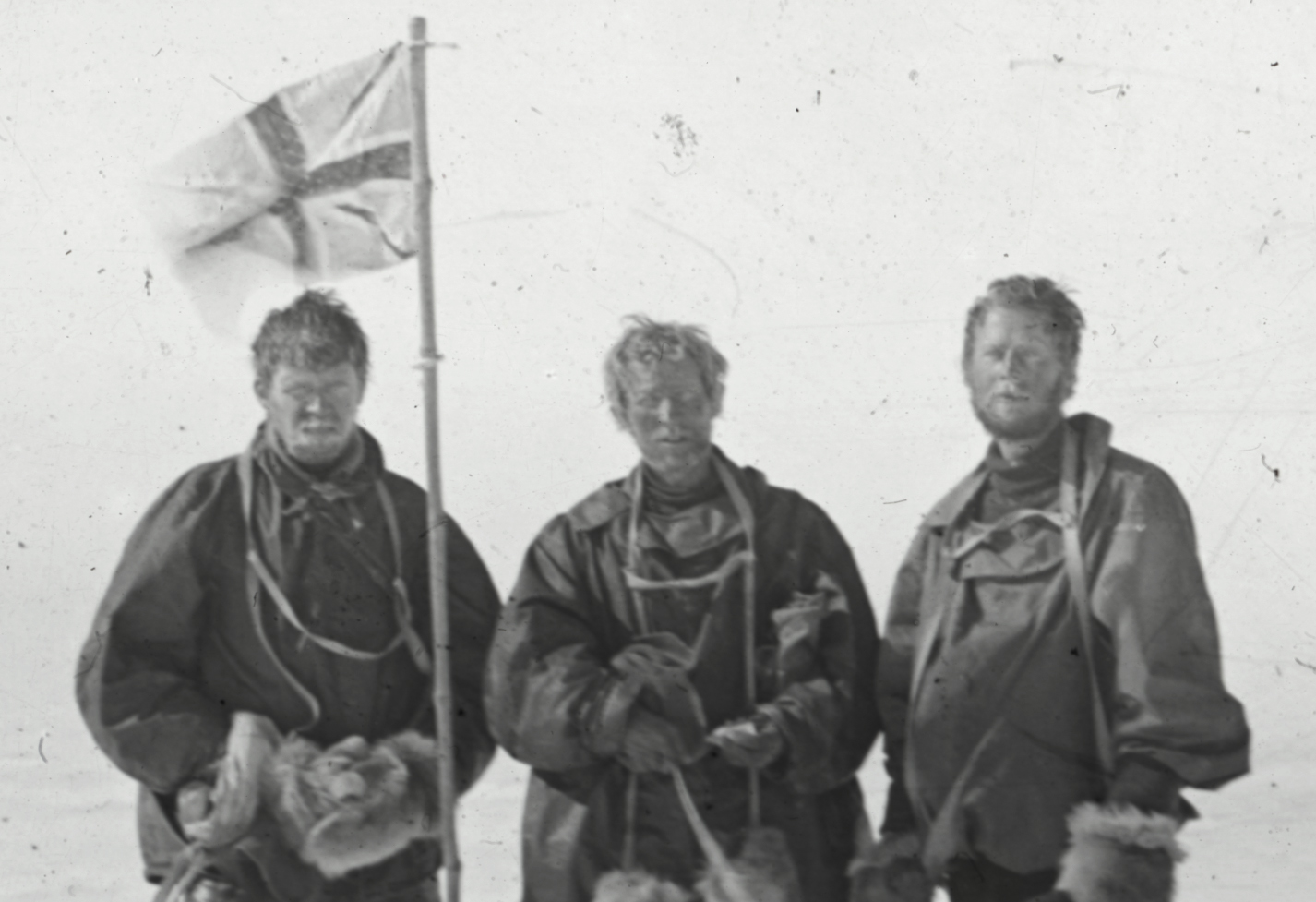
Mackay, David, and Mawson at the South Magnetic Pole on 16 January 1909

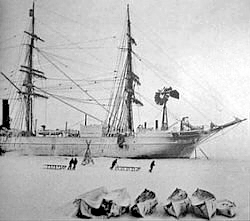
RRS Discovery in Antarctica c. 1923

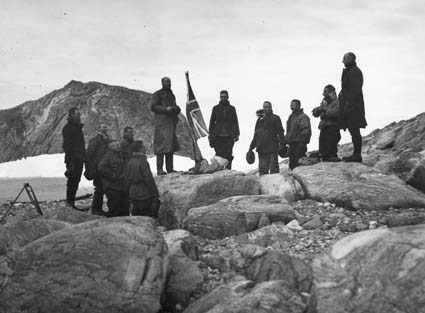
Mawson's BANZARE team claim Mac. Robertson Land

== Location ==
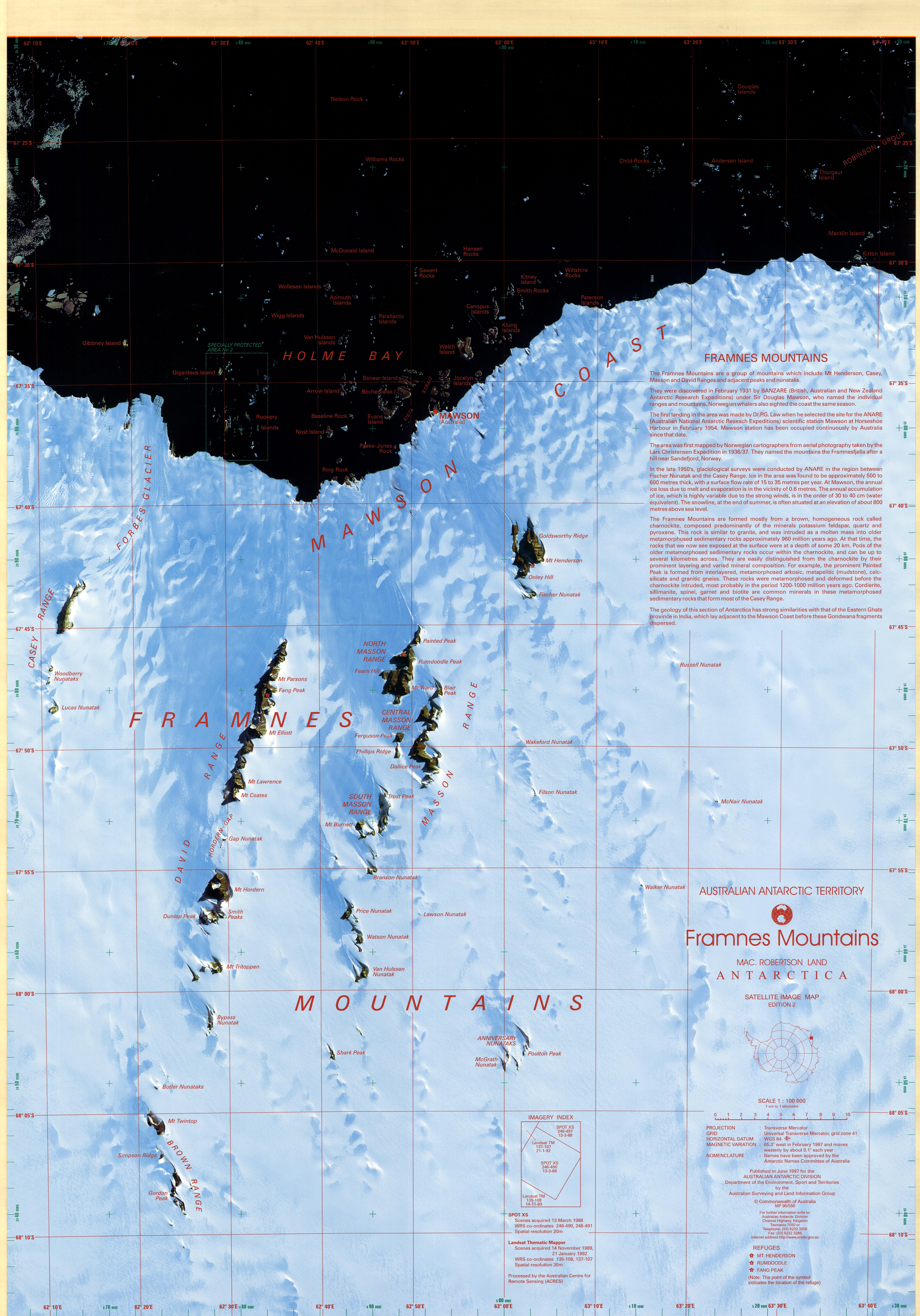
1:100,000 satellite image map of the Framnes Mountains. David range peaks are the dark line to the west (left)

The David Range (67°54′S 62°30′E) is 5 miles (8 km) west of the Masson Range, which it parallels, in the Framnes Mountains of Antarctica. It extends 16 miles (26 km) in a north-northeast–south-southwest direction. The range is about 11 kilometres (6.8 mi) south of Holme Bay. (Note: Filson (1966) gives the length of the range as 45 kilometres (28 mi), while Alberts (1995) gives it as 16 miles (26 km). Filson may be including the Brown Range in the David Range.) The range lies to the southwest of Mawson Station. The northern tip of the range is nearly 10 kilometres (6.2 mi) due west of the northern tip of the Masson Range. The Brown Range (or Sortindane Peaks) is to the south and the Casey Range to the east. The highest point is the peak of Mount Elliot, at about 1,300 metres (4,300 ft).

== Appearance ==
According to the 1960 Sailing Directions for Antarctica

The David Range lies parallel to the Masson Range and about 5 miles to the westward. It is a striking rugged mass stretching southward about 15 miles. It is about 3,500 feet high with the highest elevation in Mount Coates, about 4,600 feet high, near the southern end of the ridge. Mount Hordern, about 4,954 feet high, is a conspicuous mountain lying about 5 miles southward of the Coates massif.

== Geology ==
The Framnes Mountains have elevations up to 1,500 metres (4,900 ft) above sea level, and rise up to 400 metres (1,300 ft) above the ice surface. They have dark, weathered charnockite bedrock that is littered with light-colored quartz-rich, granitic gneiss glacial erratics. The erratics cover the lower slopes of the David Range and Mount Hordern, but are not found more than about 250 metres (820 ft) above the present-day ice surface. Above this level the darker charnockite bedrock is exposed. Probably the boulders were transported from the south and deposited by ice during the last glacial maximum, while the exposed bedrock would have remained above the ice.

== Glaciation ==
The East Antarctic Ice Sheet (EAIS) formed about 34 million years ago, and seems to have persisted since then with periodic fluctuations in thickness between glacial and inter-glacial cycles. During the last glacial cycle the ice sheet thickened more near the coast, less further inland. This is shown by the upper limit of glacial erratic boulders, ranging from 820 metres (2,690 ft) on Fang Peak near the sea in the north of David Range, to 860 metres (2,820 ft) on Mount Elliot, 1,100 metres (3,600 ft) on Mount Coates and 1,300 metres (4,300 ft) on Mount Hordern, which is about 30 kilometres (19 mi) from the sea. The ice surface appears have lowered by several hundred meters during the present interglacial.

Today the range has a number of small mountain glaciers. The David and Masson ranges divide the ice flow in the Framnes Mountains into three outlet glacial streams. Ice surface velocities of 21 metres (69 ft) per year have been measured in the ice stream to the east of the David Range, and 31 metres (102 ft) per year in the ice stream to the west. In the period between January and September 1956 ice in the plateau near the range moved up to 36 feet (11 m).

== Features ==
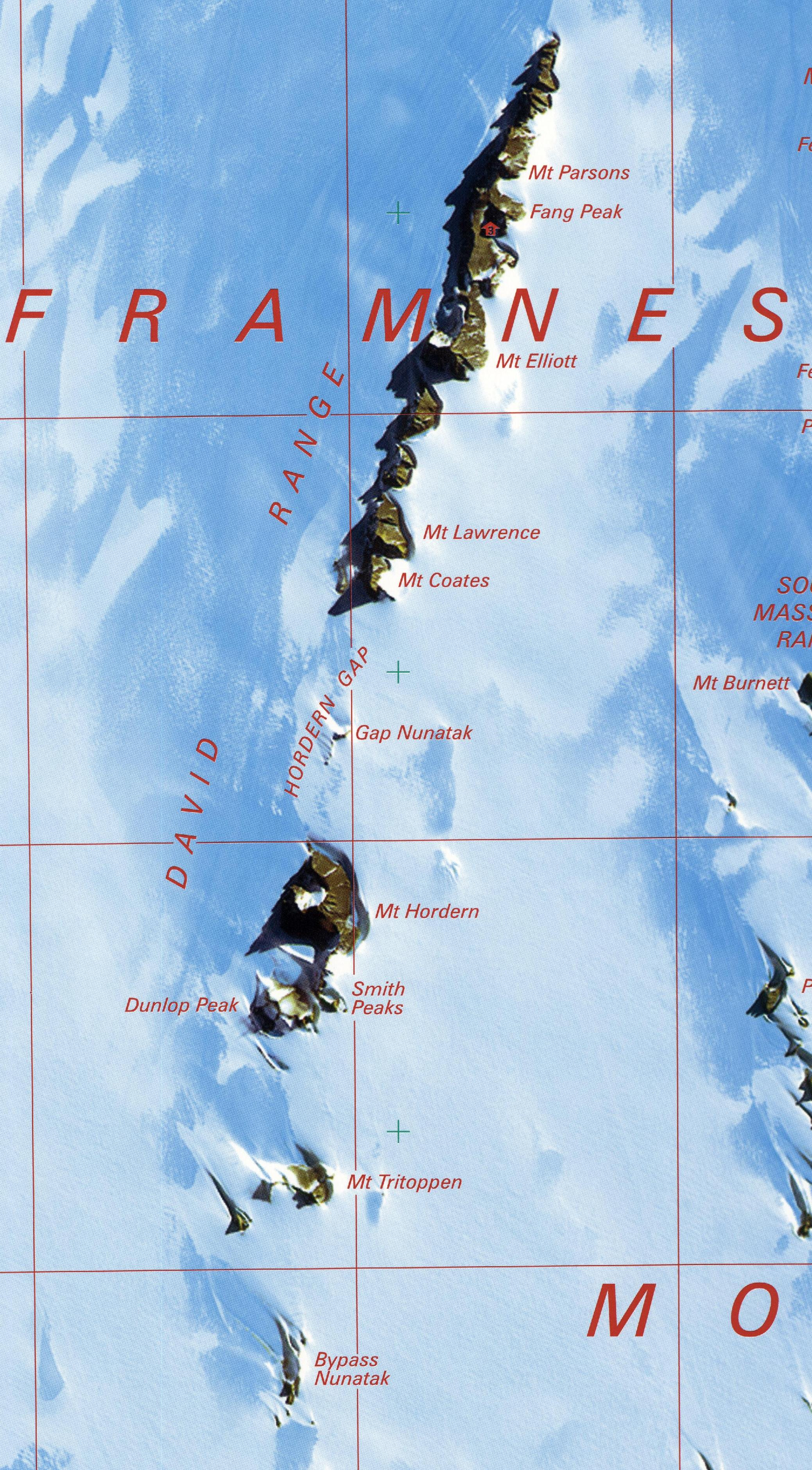
1997 Satellite image map of David Range

The features are listed from north to south. Descriptions are mostly taken from Geographic Names of the Antarctic (1995).

=== Mount Parsons ===
67°47′S 62°35′E. A prominent pointed peak, 1,120 metres (3,670 ft), standing in the David Range 1 mile (1.6 km) south-southwest of its north extremity. Mapped by Norwegian cartographers from aerial photos taken by the Lan Christensen Expedition in 1936−37. The peak was visited in January 1956 by an ANARE party led by John Bechervaise. Named by ANCA for Neville Parsons. cosmic ray physicist at Mawson Station, 1955.

=== Fang Peak ===
67°46′32″S 62°34′31″E. Fang Peak is about 3 kilometres (1.9 mi) south of Mount Parsons and is 1,032 metres (3,386 ft) high. It is a prominent conical peak, named because its shape resembles a tooth. The peak emerges from an unusually clear frozen lake. The slopes of the mountain below the ice surface are visible, as are other mountains that are completely covered by the ice.

In 1959 J C Armstrong, surveyor at Mawson Station, used the peak as an unoccupied trigonometrical station. In January 2023 a team from the Mawson Mountaineering Club climbed the peak.

=== Mount Elliot ===
67.82169°S 62.55750°E. At 1,236 metres (4,055 ft) the mountain is the highest point of the northern ridge of the David Range. Sir Douglas Mawson first saw it from the sea in 1930. It was first climbed in January 1956 by an ANARE party led by J.M. Béchervaise. The peak is named after F.W., Elliott, weather observer at Mawson Station in 1955.

=== Mount Lawrence ===
(67°51′S 62°31′E. A peak, 1,230 metres (4,040 ft), just north of Mount Coates in the David Range of the Frammes Mountains, Mac. Robertscm Land. Mapped by Norwegian cartographers from air photos taken by the Lan Christensen Expedition, 1936–37. Named by ANCA for J. Lawrence, diesel mechanic, at Mawson Station in 1959.

=== Mount Coates ===
67°52′S 62°31′E. A peak, 1,280 metres (4,200 ft), just south of Mount Lawrence in the David Range of the Framnes Mountains. Discovered and named in February 1931 by the BANZARE under Mawson. Mount Coates is about 1,280 metres (4,200 ft) in altitude. Lichen species found on it include Biatorella antarctica, Lecanora rubina var. melanophthalma f. exulans and Lecisea phillipsiana.

=== Hordern Gap ===
67°53′S 62°30′E. A gap, 3 miles (4.8 km) wide, between Mount Coates and Mount Hordern in the David Range of the Framnes Mountains. Mapped by Norwegian cartographers from aerial photographs taken by the Lars Christensen Expedition, 1936-37. This gap was used by ANARE parties in 1957 and 1958 as a route through the range. Named by ANARE for its proximity to Mount Hordern. The gap was used by an exploration of the route to the Amery Ice Shelf in October 1962 – January 1963, which followed the 1957 route through Hordern Gap and west of Mount Twintop. Near Hordern Gap the tractor train encountered very rough sastrugi.

=== Gap Nunatak ===
67°54′S 62°29′E. A small nunatak, 1,030 metres (3,380 ft), standing in the center of Hordern Gap in the David Range, Framnes Mountains. Mapped by Norwegian cartographers from air photos taken by the Lars Christensen Expedition, 1936–37, and named Metoppen (the middle peak). Renamed by ANARE for its location in Hordern Gap. Not: Metoppen.

=== Mount Hordern ===
67°56′S 62°29′E. A peak, 1,510 metres (4,950 ft), standing 4 miles (6.4 km) south of Mount Coates in the David Range. Discovered in February 1931 by the BANZARE under Mawson, and named for Sir Samuel Horden, a patron of this expedition and the AAE under Mawson, 1911–14.

=== Smith Peaks ===
67°57′S 62°29′E. A group of peaks standing close south of Mount Hortlem in the David Range of the Framnes Mountains. Mapped by Norwegian cartographers from aerial photographs taken by the Lan Christensen Expedition, 1936-37. Remapped by ANARE, 1957–60. and named by ANCA for F.A. Smith, diesel mechanic at Mawson Station, 1957.

=== Dunlop Peak ===
67.94822°S 62.46439°E. The southern peak of Smith Peaks. It is about 2 kilometres (1.2 mi) south of Mount Hordern. It is named for R. Dunlop, cosmic ray physicist at Mawson Station in 1959.

=== Mount Tritoppen ===
67°59′S 62°29′E. A triple-peaked mountain, 1,350 metres (4,430 ft), standing 3 miles (4.8 km) south of Mount Hordern in the David Range of the Framnes Mountains. Mapped by Norwegian cartographers from aerial photographs taken by the Lan Christensen Expedition. 1936–37. and named Tritoppen (the three-peaked mountain). Not: Tritoppen. Tritoppen Peak.

=== Bypass Nunatak ===
68°01′S 62°28′E. A nunatak about 2 miles (3.2 km) south of Mount Tritoppen in the David Range of the Framnes Mountains. Mapped by Norwegian cartographers from air photos taken by the Lars Christensen Expedition (1936–37) and called Steinen (the stone). It was renamed by ANARE because the feature marked the turning point in the route taken by the 1958 ANARE seismic party in order to bypass dangerous terrain to the southwest. Not: Steinen.

=== Mount Twintop ===
68°5′S 62°22′E. A twin-peaked mountain about 6 miles (9.7 km) south-southwest of Mount Tritoppen in the south part of the David Range, Frarnnes Mountains. Mapped by Norwegian cartographers from air photos taken by the Lars Christensen Expedition (1936–37) and named Tvitoppen (the twin peak). The translated form of the name recommended by ANCA has been adopted. Not: Tvitoppen Peak. Mount Twintop is weathering badly, and no flora have been found on it.

== See also ==
- Simpson Ridge, a feature nearby Mount Twintop

== Sources ==
- Framnes Mountains Satellite Image Map, Australian Antarctic Data Centre
- Alberts, Fred G., ed. (1995), Geographic Names of the Antarctic (PDF) (2 ed.), United States Board on Geographic Names This article incorporates public domain material from websites or documents of the United States Board on Geographic Names.
- David Range, Australian Antarctic Data Centre
- Carstens, David R. (1 February 1963), Report on Journey to Amery Ice Shelf October 1962 – January 1963
- Dunlop Peak, Australian Antarctic Data Centre
- Fang Peak, Australian Antarctic Data Centre
- The ascent of Fang Peak, Australian Antarctic Program, 20 January 2023
- Filson, Rex B. (1966), The Lichens and Mosses of Mac. Robertson Land (PDF), Antarctic Division, Department of External Affairs Australia
- Minard, James P. (1951), Glaciology and Glacial Geology of Antarctica, United States. Antarctic Projects Office
- Mount Elliott, Australian Antarctic Data Centre
- Mackintosh, Andrew; White, Duanne; Fink, David; Gore, Damian (June 2007), "Exposure ages from mountain dipsticks in Mac. Robertson Land, East Antarctica, indicate little change in ice-sheet thickness since the Last Glacial Maximum", Geology, 35 (6), doi:10.1130/G23503A.1
- Mackintosh, Andrew N.; Verleyen, Elie; O'Brien, Philip E.; White, Duanne A. (15 September 2014), "Retreat history of the East Antarctic Ice Sheet since the Last Glacial Maximum", Quaternary Science Reviews, 100: 10–30
- Marmo, B. A.; Dawson, J. (1996), "Movement and structural features observed in ice masses, Framnes Mountains, Mac.Robertson Land, East Antarctica]", Annals of Glaciology, 23, Cambridge University Press: 388–395, doi:10.3189/S0260305500013689
- "Mawson station: a brief history", History of Australian Antarctic stations, Australian Antarctic Division, 12 August 2010
- Sailing Directions for Antarctica: Includes Islands South of Latitude 60, United States. Defense Mapping Agency. Hydrographic Center ', 1960
- Williams, Matt (7 November 2020), Post Fang Peak, Australian Antarctic Program
