= Framnes Mountains =

Mountain range in Antarctica

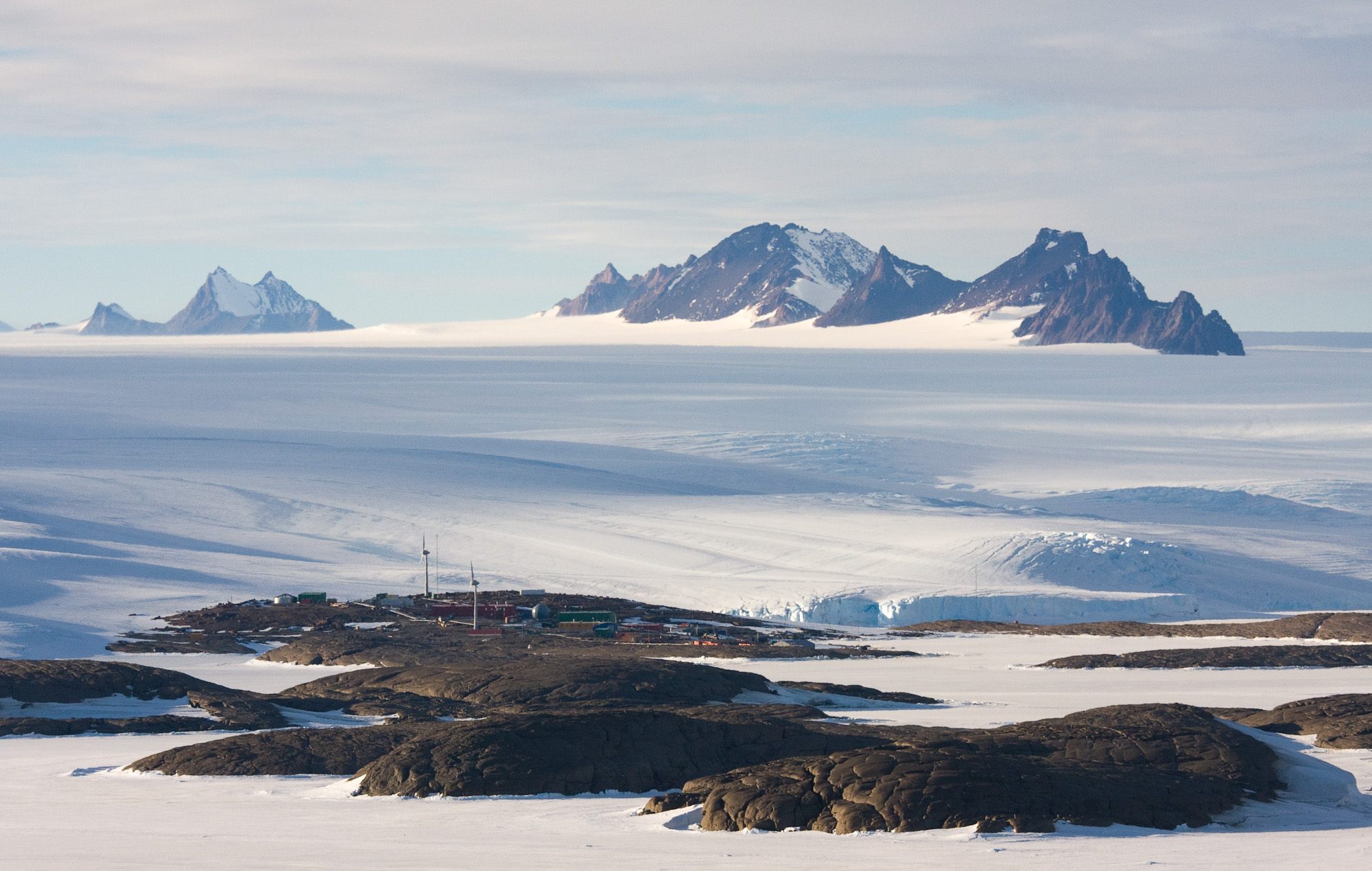
- Mawson Station from Welch Island, looking toward the David Range of the Framnes Mountains

Highest point
- Elevation: 1,490.9 m (4,891 ft)
- Coordinates: 67°50′56″S 62°40′50″E

Geography
- Location within Antarctica

The Framnes Mountains is a group of Antarctic mountain ranges in Mac. Robertson Land, to the south of the Mawson Coast. The range is surrounded by, and largely covered by, an ice sheet.

== Discovery ==
The three major ranges and other lesser features were sighted and named in February 1931 by the British Australian and New Zealand Antarctic Research Expedition under Douglas Mawson. This coast was also sighted by Norwegian whalers in the same season. The whole area was mapped in detail by Norwegian cartographers from aerial photographs taken by the Lars Christensen Expedition in January 1937. This overall name for the several ranges was given by Lars Christensen after Framnesfjellet, a hill near Sandefjord, Norway. The first person to land in the area was Dr. Phillip Law in February 1954. He chose the site for the Mawson Station on the coast to the north of the Framnes Mountains for the Australian National Antarctic Research Expeditions (ANARE). Australia has occupied Mawson Station continuously since then.

== Appearance ==
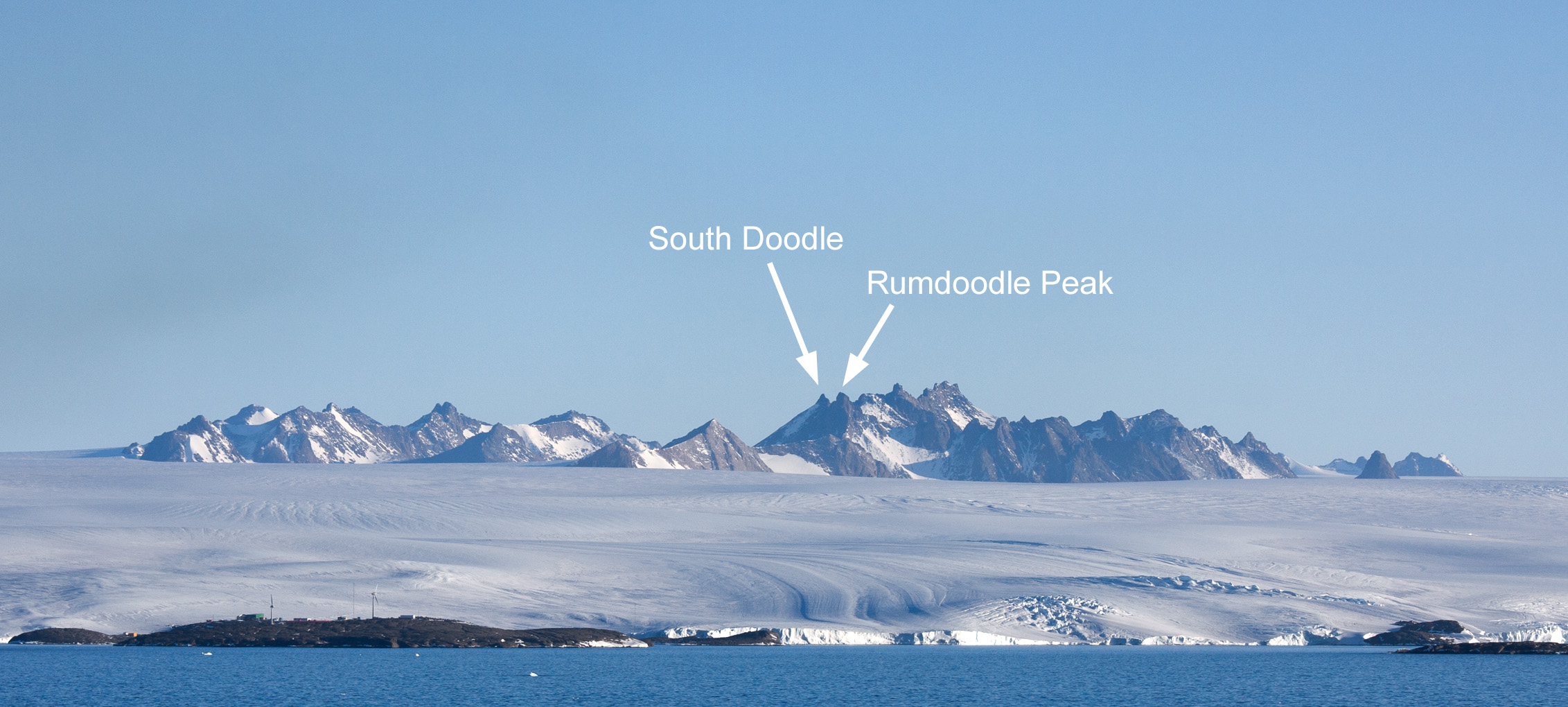
Northern and Central Massons from sea

The Framnes Mountains have elevations up to 1,500 metres (4,900 ft) above sea level, and rise up to 400 metres (1,300 ft) above the ice surface. They have dark, weathered charnockite bedrock that is littered with light-coloured quartz-rich, granitic gneiss glacial erratics. The range is surrounded by, and largely covered by, an ice sheet. Only the peaks are visible.

== Geology ==
The geology of the Framnes Mountains is very similar to that of the Eastern Ghats in India, which lay beside the Mawson Coast before Gondwana broke up. The mountains are mostly formed of charnockite, a homogeneous brown rock similar to granite that mainly consists of potassium feldspar, quartz and pyroxene. These rocks were formed about 960 million years ago at a depth of about 20 kilometres (12 mi) as a molten mass within older metamorphosed sedimentary rocks.

Glacial erratic boulders of light-colored granitic gneiss cover the lower slopes of Mount Henderson, the David Range and Mount Hordern, but are not found more than about 250 metres (820 ft) above the present-day ice surface. Above this level the darker charnockite bedrock is exposed. Probably the boulders were transported from the south and deposited by ice during the last glacial maximum, while the exposed bedrock would have remained above the ice.

The charnockite contains regions up to 20 kilometres (12 mi) wide of the older metamorphosed sedimentary rock, one of which includes most of the Casey Range. Painted Peak in the North Masson Range is an example, composed of rocks that were metamorphosed and deformed 1200 to 1000 million years ago. They include interlayered, metamorphosed arkose, metapelite, calcsilicates and granitic gneiss. Common minerals in the metamorphosed sedimentary rocks include cordierite, sillimanite, spinel, garnet and biotite.

== Glaciation ==
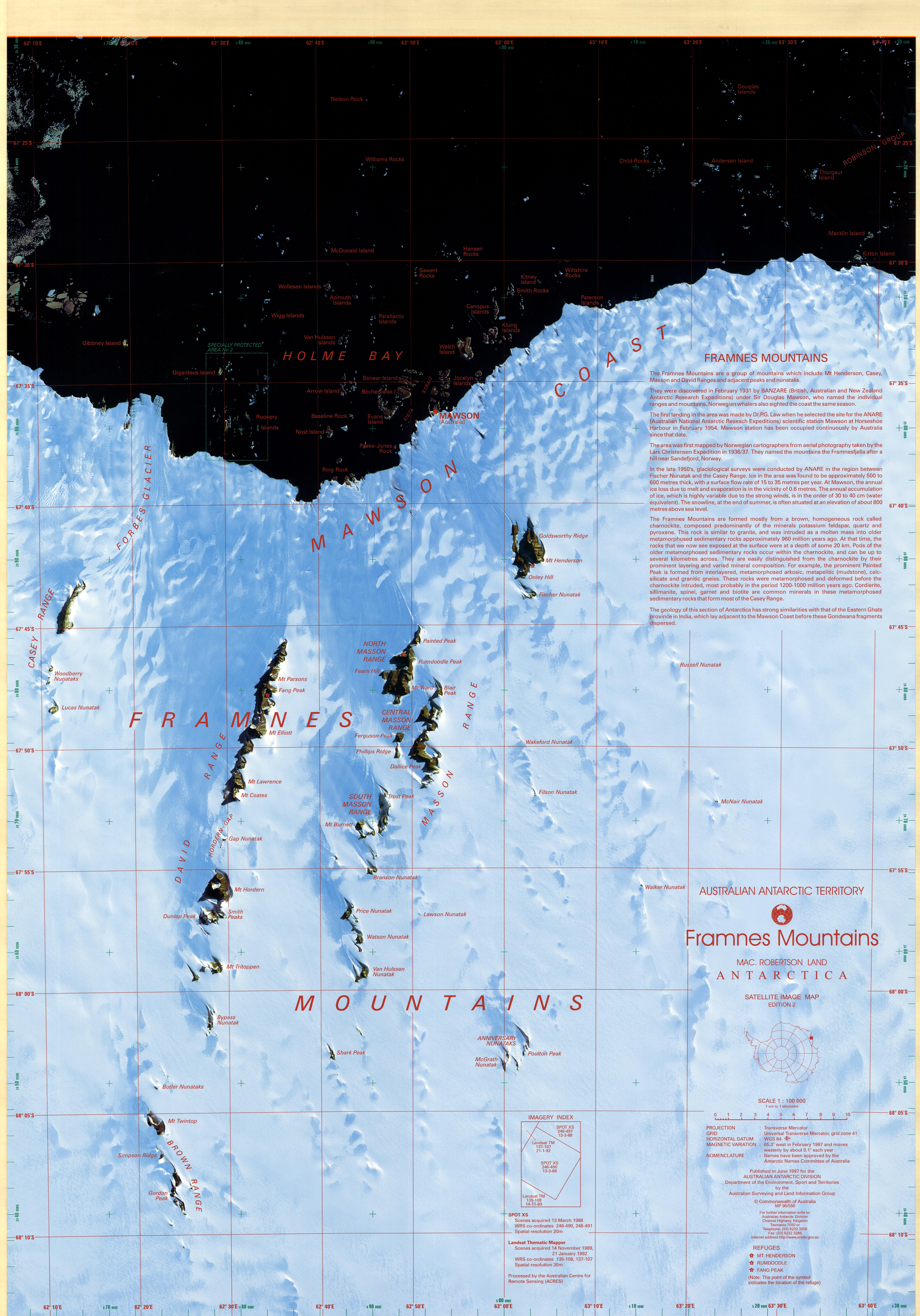
1:100,000 satellite image map of the Framnes Mountains

The East Antarctic Ice Sheet (EAIS) formed about 34 million years ago, and seems to have persisted since then with periodic fluctuations in thickness between glacial and inter-glacial cycles. During the last glacial cycle the ice sheet thickened more near the coast, less further inland. This is shown by the upper limit of glacial erratic boulders, ranging from 820 metres (2,690 ft) on Fang Peak near the sea in the north of David Range, to 1,300 metres (4,300 ft) on Mount Hordern, which is about 30 kilometres (19 mi) from the sea. The ice surface appears have lowered by several hundred meters during the present interglacial.

ANARE conducted glaciological surveys in the late 1950s between Fischer Nunatak and the Casey Range, where they found that the ice was about 500 to 600 metres (1,600 to 2,000 ft) thick, and flowed at a rate of 15 to 35 metres (49 to 115 ft) per year. The David and Masson ranges divide the ice flow in the Framnes Mountains into three outlet glacial streams, which cover an area of about 2,400 square kilometres (930 sq mi). They carry ice from the East Antarctic ice sheet into Holme Bay. Ice surface velocities of 21 metres (69 ft) per year have been measured in the ice stream to the east of the David Range, and 31 metres (102 ft) per year in the ice stream to the west.

== Lakes ==
The Framnes Mountains contain perennially frozen freshwater glacial lakes, some over 100 metres (330 ft) deep. These are isolated from the surrounding ice sheet by moats of melt water and granular ice above the perennial ice. The perennial ice within the moat is slightly elevated above the moat. In the summer months snow banks that formed in the winter on nearby rocky banks melt and feed streams that drain into the lake. With lakes like Patterned Lake in the north end of the Central Masson Range there does not seem to be any drainage on or below the surface, so water is lost only through evaporation.

There are diverse biological communities in a series of deep epiglacial lakes (Note: Epiglacial lakes are formed at the grounded edge of glaciers and ice sheets, where glacial melt water renews the lake.) in the Framnes Mountains about 30 kilometres (19 mi) inland from Mawson Station. These lakes are covered by as much as 5 metres (16 ft) of permanent ice, so have no contact with the atmosphere. Their temperature is less than 0.2 °C (32.4 °F), they are slightly brackish and are oxygenated throughout. They are basic with high pH readings of 10.5 to 11.0. Based on chlorophyll content their biomass is low to moderate. One lake had a cyanobacterial mat under the ice with a community of grazing animals that included nematodes, tardigrades and perhaps copepods. The dominant grazers in other lakes were rotifers.

== Features ==
The Framnes Mountains consist of Casey Range, Masson Range, David Range, and Brown Range, and adjacent peaks and mountains. The east of the Framnes Mountains, from north to south, contains the Mount Henderson massif, Masson Range, Trilling Peaks and Shark Peak. The central section from north to south holds the David Range, Butler Nunataks and Brown Range. The Casey Range is west of the David Range.

=== Mount Henderson massif ===
67°42′S 63°04′E. A massive mountain, 970 metres (3,180 ft), rising through the ice sheet 5 miles (8.0 km) southeast of Holme Bay and a like distance northeast of the north end of the Masson Range. Discovered in February 1931 by the BANZARE under Mawson, who named it after W. Henderson, Director of the Australian Department of External Affairs and a member of the Australian Antarctic Committee in 1929.

=== Masson Range ===
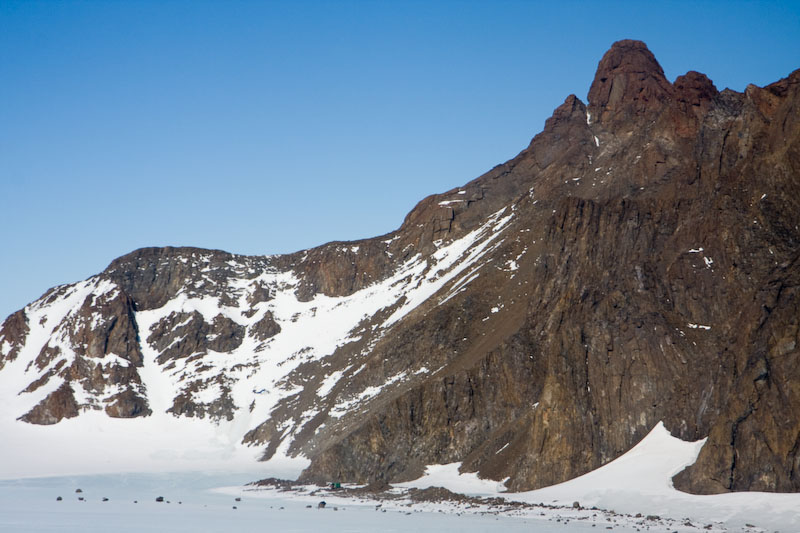
Rumdoodle Peak in the North Masson Range

67°51′S 62°50′E. A high broken chain of mountains, consisting primarily of North Masson, Central Masson, and South Masson Ranges, forming a part of the Framnes Mountains. Having several peaks over 1,000 metres (3,300 ft), the range extends in a north-south direction for 15 miles (24 km). Discovered and charted by the BANZARE, 1929–31, under Mawson, and named for Professor Sir David Orme Masson, a member of the Advisory Committee for this expedition as well as the AAE, 1911–14, under Mawson. First visited by an ANARE party led by John Béchervaise in 1956.

=== Trilling Peaks ===
67°58′S 62°45′E. A group of linear nunataks comprising three main peaks standing 3 miles (4.8 km) south S of the South Masson Range in the Framnes Mountains, Mac. Robertson Land. Mapped by Norwegian cartographers from air photos taken by the Lars Christensen Expedition, 1936–37, and named Trillingnutane (the triplet peaks). Not: Trillingnutane.

=== Shark Peak ===
68°03′S 62°41′E. An isolated nunatak 3.5 miles (5.6 km) south-southwest of Van Hulssen Nunatak in the Framnes Mountains. Mapped by Norwegian cartographers from air photos taken by the Lars Christensen Expedition, 1936–37, and named Hånuten (the shark peak). The translated form of the name recommended by ANCA has been adopted.

=== David Range ===
67°54′S 62°30′E. A range 5 miles (8.0 km) west of Masson Range, which it parallels, in the Framnes Mountains. It extends 16 miles (26 km) in a north-northeast – south-southwest direction, with peaks rising to 1,500 meters. Discovered on 14 February 1931 by the BANZARE under Mawson, who named it for Professor Sir T.W. Edgeworth David.

=== Butler Nunataks ===
68°03′S 62°24′E. A small group of nunataks immediately north of Mount Twintop in the Framnes Mountains. Mapped from ANARE surveys of 1954–62. Named by ANCA for W.J. Butler, senior diesel mechanic at Mawson Station in 1967.

=== Sørtindane Peaks or Brown Range (Note: Geographic Names of the Antarctic states that the correct name is Sørtindane Peaks, not Brown Range. However, the Australian Antarctic Data Centre uses the name Brown Range.) ===
68°08′S 62°24′E. A group of peaks just south of Mount Twintop at the south end of the David Range, Framnes Mountains. Mapped by Norwegian cartographers from air photos taken by the Lars Christensen Expedition (1936–37) and named Sortindane (the southern peaks). Not: Brown Range, Gory Sørtindane.

=== Casey Range ===
67°47′S 62°12′E. A jagged, razor-backed ridge and a few nunataks in a line extending north–south, standing 8 miles (13 km) west of David Range, in the Framnes Mountains. Discovered by the BANZARE, 1929–31, under Mawson, who named it for Rt. Hon. Richard G. Casey.

== Sources ==
- Alberts, Fred G., ed. (1995), Geographic Names of the Antarctic (PDF) (2 ed.), United States Board on Geographic Names This article incorporates public domain material from websites or documents of the United States Board on Geographic Names.
- Chambers, J.L.C.; Wilson, C.J.L.; Adamson, D.A. (1986), "A Crystallographic Study of the Perennially Frozen Ice Surface of Patterned Lake, Framnes Mountains, East Antarctica", Journal of Glaciology, 32 (112), Cambridge University Press: 520–526, doi:10.3189/S0022143000012235
- Framnes Mountains Satellite Image Map, Australian Antarctic Data Centre
- Framnes Mountains, Australian Antarctic Data Centre
- "Framnes Mountains". Geographic Names Information System. United States Geological Survey, United States Department of the Interior. This article incorporates public domain material from "Framnes Mountains". Geographic Names Information System. United States Geological Survey.
- Gibson, J.A.E. (2004), "Limnology of epiglacial lakes of the Framnes mountains, Antarctica: insights into a widespread but poorly studied lake type" (PDF), Programme and Abstracts of the Australian Society for Limnology 44th National Congress
- Mackintosh, Andrew; White, Duanne; Fink, David; Gore, Damian (June 2007), "Exposure ages from mountain dipsticks in Mac. Robertson Land, East Antarctica, indicate little change in ice-sheet thickness since the Last Glacial Maximum", Geology, 35 (6), doi:10.1130/G23503A.1
- Mackintosh, Andrew N.; Verleyen, Elie; O'Brien, Philip E.; White, Duanne A. (15 September 2014), "Retreat history of the East Antarctic Ice Sheet since the Last Glacial Maximum", Quaternary Science Reviews, 100: 10–30
- Marmo, B. A.; Dawson, J. (1996), "Movement and structural features observed in ice masses, Framnes Mountains, Mac.Robertson Land, East Antarctica]", Annals of Glaciology, 23, Cambridge University Press: 388–395, doi:10.3189/S0260305500013689
