= Geography of Antarctica =

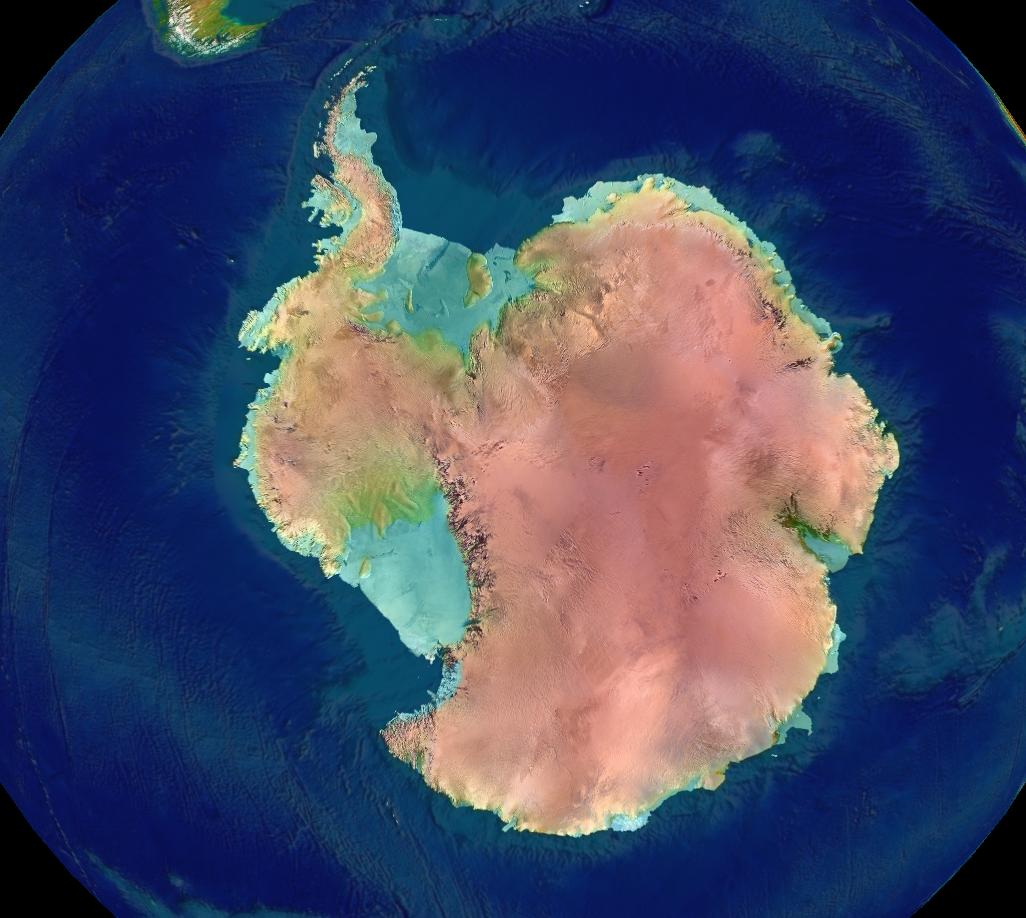
- Continent: Antarctica
- Coordinates: 80°S 90°E
- Area: Ranked 2nd (unofficially)
  - Total: 14,200,000 km^{2} (5,500,000 sq mi)
  - Land: 98%
  - Water: 2%
- Coastline: 17,968 km (11,165 mi)
- Borders: None
- Highest point: Vinson Massif, 4,897 m (16,066 ft)
- Lowest point: Denman Glacier, −3,500 m (−11,482.9 ft)
- Longest river: Onyx River, 32 km
- Largest lake: Lake Vostok, 26,000 sq m (est.)
- Climate: subantarctic to antarctic
- Terrain: ice and barren rock
- Natural resources: krill, fin fish, crab
- Natural hazards: high winds, blizzards, cyclonic storms, volcanism
- Environmental issues: depleting ozone layer, rising sea level

The geography of Antarctica is dominated by its south polar location and, thus, by ice. The Antarctic continent, located in the Earth's Southern Hemisphere, is centered asymmetrically around the South Pole and largely south of the Antarctic Circle. It is washed by the Southern (or Antarctic) Ocean or, depending on definition, the southern Pacific, Atlantic, and Indian Oceans. It has an area of more than 14,200,000 square kilometres or 5,480,000 square miles. Antarctica is the largest ice desert in the world.

Some 98% of Antarctica is covered by the Antarctic ice sheet, the world's largest ice sheet and also its largest reservoir of fresh water. Averaging at least 1.6 kilometres or 1 mile thick, the ice is so massive that it has depressed the continental bedrock in some areas more than 2.5 kilometres or 1.6 miles below sea level; subglacial lakes of liquid water also occur (e.g. Lake Vostok). Ice shelves and rises populate the ice sheet on the periphery. The present Antarctic ice sheet accounts for 90 percent of Earth's total ice volume and 70 percent of its fresh water. It houses enough water to raise global sea level by 200 feet or 60 metres.

In September 2018, researchers at the National Geospatial-Intelligence Agency released a high resolution terrain map (detail down to the size of a car, and less in some areas) of Antarctica, named the "Reference Elevation Model of Antarctica" (REMA).

== Regions ==
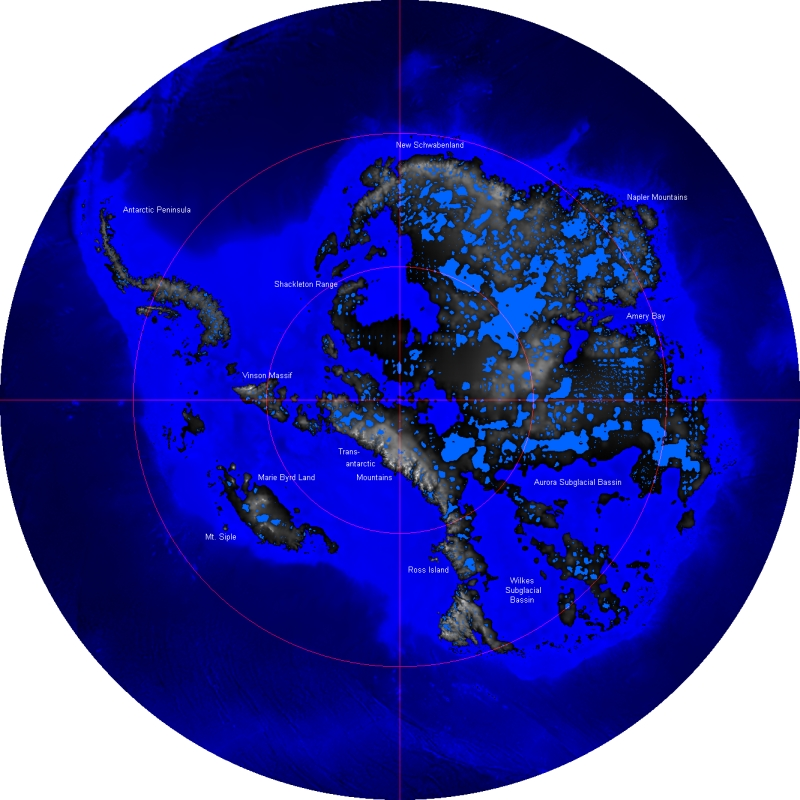
Antarctica without its ice cover. This map does not consider that sea level would rise because of the melted ice, nor that the landmass would rise by several hundred meters over a few tens of thousands of years after the weight of the ice was no longer depressing the landmass.

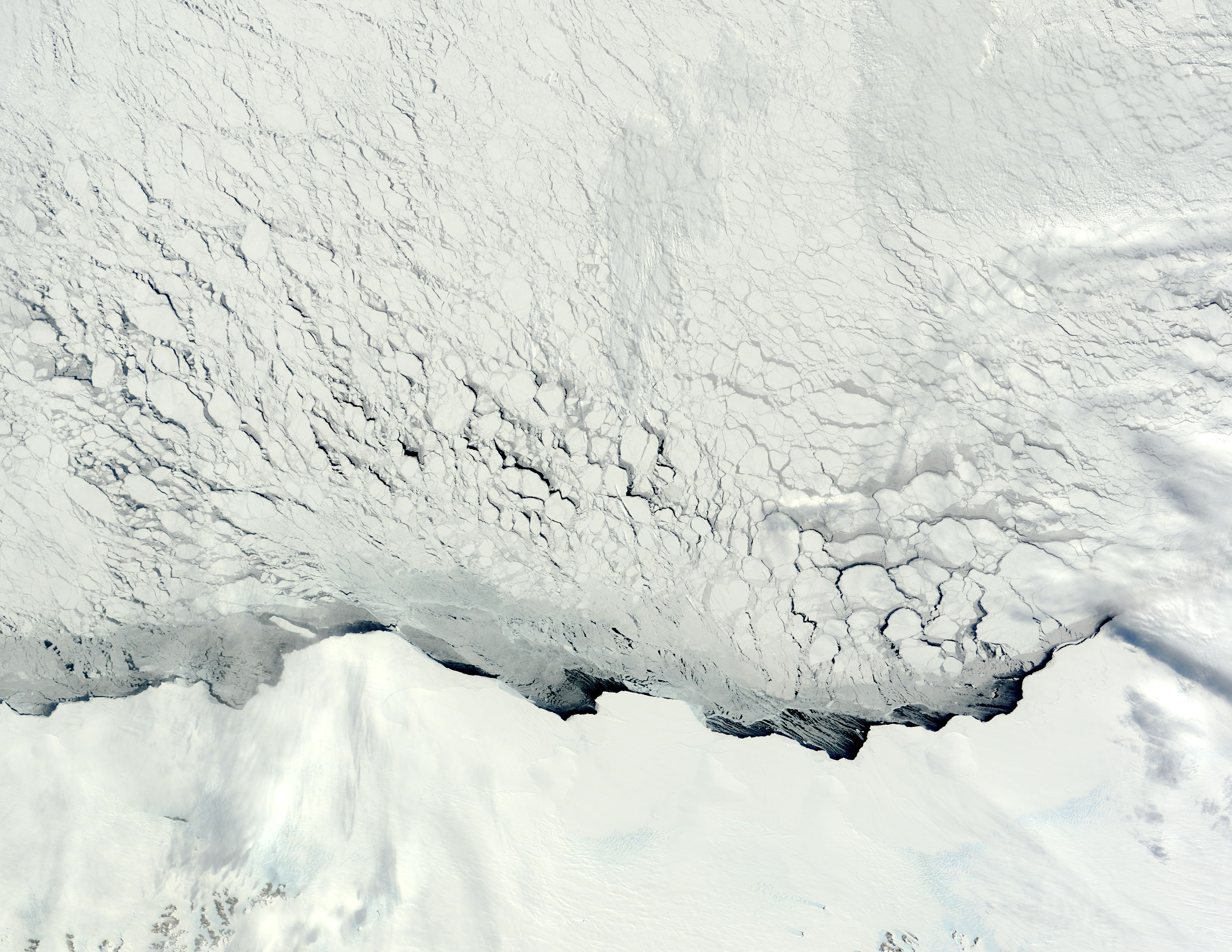
The Princesses Astrid and Ragnhild Coasts

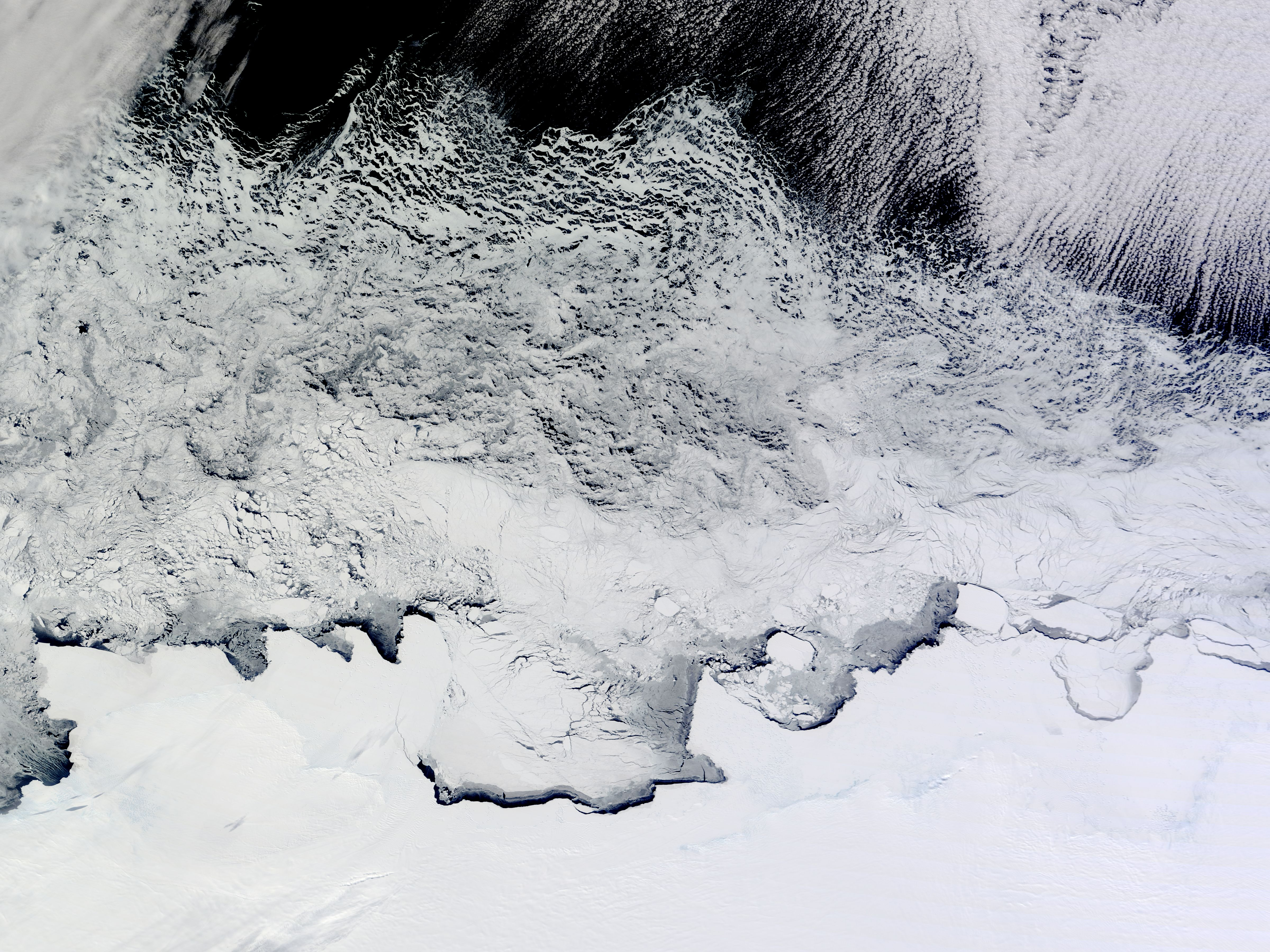
The Banzare, Sabrina, and Budd Law Dome Coasts

Physically, Antarctica is divided in two by the Transantarctic Mountains, close to the neck between the Ross Sea and the Weddell Sea. Western Antarctica and Eastern Antarctica correspond roughly to the western and eastern hemispheres relative to the Greenwich meridian. (Note: This usage has been regarded as Eurocentric by some; the alternative terms Lesser Antarctica and Greater Antarctica (respectively) are sometimes preferred.)

West Antarctica is covered by the West Antarctic Ice Sheet. There has been some concern about this ice sheet, as there is a small chance it will collapse due to rising temperatures in the region. If it does, global ocean levels will rise by a few metres in a short period of time.

== Volcanoes ==
Volcanic activity occurring beneath glacial ice sheets is known as glaciovolcanism. An article published in 2017 claims that researchers from the University of Edinburgh discovered 91 new volcanoes below the Antarctic ice sheet, adding to the 47 volcanoes that were already known. As of 2017, 138 possible volcanoes have been identified in West Antarctica. There is limited knowledge about West Antarctic Volcanoes due to the presence of the West Antarctic Ice Sheet, which heavily covers the West Antarctic Rift System — a likely hub for volcanic activity. Researchers find it difficult to properly identify volcanic activity due to the comprehensive ice covering.

East Antarctica is significantly larger than West Antarctica, and similarly remains widely unexplored in terms of its volcanic potential. While there are some indications that there is volcanic activity under the East Antarctic Ice Sheet, there is not a significant amount of present information on the subject.

Mount Erebus, as the southernmost historically active volcanic site on the planet, is one of the most notable sites in the study of Antarctic volcanism.

Deception Island is another active Antarctic volcano. It is one of the most protected areas in the Antarctic, given its situation between the South Shetland Islands and the Antarctic Peninsula. As one of the most active volcanoes in the Antarctic Peninsula, it has been studied closely after its initial discovery in 1820.

There are four volcanoes on the mainland of Antarctica that are considered to be active on the basis of observed fumarolic activity or "recent" tephra deposits:

1. Mount Melbourne (2,730 m) (74°21'S., 164°42'E.), a stratovolcano;
2. Mount Berlin (3,500 m) (76°03'S., 135°52'W.), a stratovolcano;
3. Mount Kauffman (2,365 m) (75°37'S., 132°25'W.), a stratovolcano; and
4. Mount Hampton (3,325 m) (76°29'S., 125°48'W.), a volcanic caldera.

Mount Rittmann (2,600 m) (73.45°S 165.5° E), a volcanic caldera, is dormant.

Several volcanoes on offshore islands have records of historic activity. Mount Erebus (3,795 m), a stratovolcano on Ross Island with 10 known eruptions and 1 suspected eruption. On the opposite side of the continent, Deception Island (62°57'S., 60°38'W.), a volcanic caldera with 10 known and 4 suspected eruptions, has been the most active. Buckle Island in the Balleny Islands (66°50'S., 163°12'E.), Penguin Island (62°06'S., 57°54'W.), Paulet Island (63°35'S., 55°47'W.), and Lindenberg Island (64°55'S., 59°40'W.) are also considered to be active. In 2017, the researchers of Edinburgh University discovered 91 underwater volcanoes under West Antarctica.

=== Marie Byrd Land ===
Marie Byrd Land makes up a large portion of West Antarctica, consisting of the Area below the Antarctic Peninsula. The Marie Byrd Land is a large formation of volcanic rock, characterized by 18 exposed and subglacial volcanoes. 16 of the 18 volcanoes are entirely covered by the antarctic ice sheet. There have been no eruptions recorded from any of the volcanoes in this area, however scientists believe that some of the volcanoes may be potentially active.

=== Activity ===
Scientists and researchers debate whether or not the 138 identified possible volcanoes are active or dormant. It is very hard to definitively say, given that many of these volcanic structures are buried underneath several kilometers of ice. However, ash layers within the West Antarctic Ice Sheet, as well as deformations in the ice surface indicate that the West Antarctic Rift System could be active and contain erupting volcanoes. Additionally, seismic activity in the region hints at magma movement beneath the crust, a sign of volcanic activity. Despite this, however, there is not yet definitive evidence of presently active volcanoes.

Subglacial volcanism is often characterized by ice melt and subglacial water. Though there are other sources of subglacial water, such as geothermal heat, it almost always is a condition of volcanism. Scientists remain uncertain about the presence of liquid water underneath the West Antarctic Ice Sheet, with some claiming to have found evidence indicating its existence.

=== Conditions of formation ===
In West Antarctica's Marie Byrd Land, volcanoes are typically composed of alkaline and basaltic lava. Sometimes, the volcanoes are entirely basaltic in composition. Due to the geographic similarity of the Marie Byrd Land, it is believed that the volcanoes in the West Antarctic Rift System are also composed of basalt.

Above-ice basaltic volcanoes, also known as subaerial basaltic volcanoes, generally form in tall, broad cone shapes. Since they are formed from repeated piling of liquid magma sourced from the center, they spread widely and grow upwards relatively slowly. However, West Antarctic Volcanoes form underneath ice sheets, and are thus categorized as subglacial volcanoes. Subglacial volcanoes that are monogenetic are far more narrow, steeper, flat topped structures. Polygenetic subglacial volcanoes have a wider variety of shapes and sizes due to being made up of many different eruptions. Often, they look more cone shaped, like stratovolcanoes.

=== Hazards ===
==== Hazardous ash ====
Little has been studied about the implications of volcanic ash from eruptions within the Antarctic Circle. It is likely that an eruption at lower latitudes would cause global health and aviation hazards due to ash disbursement. The clockwise air circulation around the low pressure system at the South Pole forces air upwards, hypothetically sending ash upwards towards the Stratospheric jet streams, and thus quickly dispersing it throughout the globe.

==== Melting ice ====
Recently, in 2017, a study found evidence of subglacial volcanic activity within the West Antarctic Ice Sheet. This activity poses a threat to the stability of the Ice Sheet, as volcanic activity leads to increased melting. This could possibly plunge the West Antarctic Ice Sheet into a positive feedback loop of rising temperatures and increased melting.

== Canyons ==
There are three vast canyons that run for hundreds of kilometers, cutting through tall mountains. None of the canyons are visible at the snow-covered surface of the continent since they are buried under hundreds of meters of ice. The largest of the canyons is called Foundation Trough and is over 350 kilometres (220 mi) long and 35 kilometres (22 mi) wide. The Patuxent Trough is more than 300 kilometres (190 mi) long and over 15 kilometres (9 mi) wide, while the Offset Rift Basin is 150 kilometres (90 mi) long and 30 kilometres (19 mi) wide. These three troughs all lie under and cross the so-called "ice divide" – the high ice ridge that runs all the way from the South Pole out towards the coast of West Antarctica.

== West Antarctica ==
West Antarctica on the left.

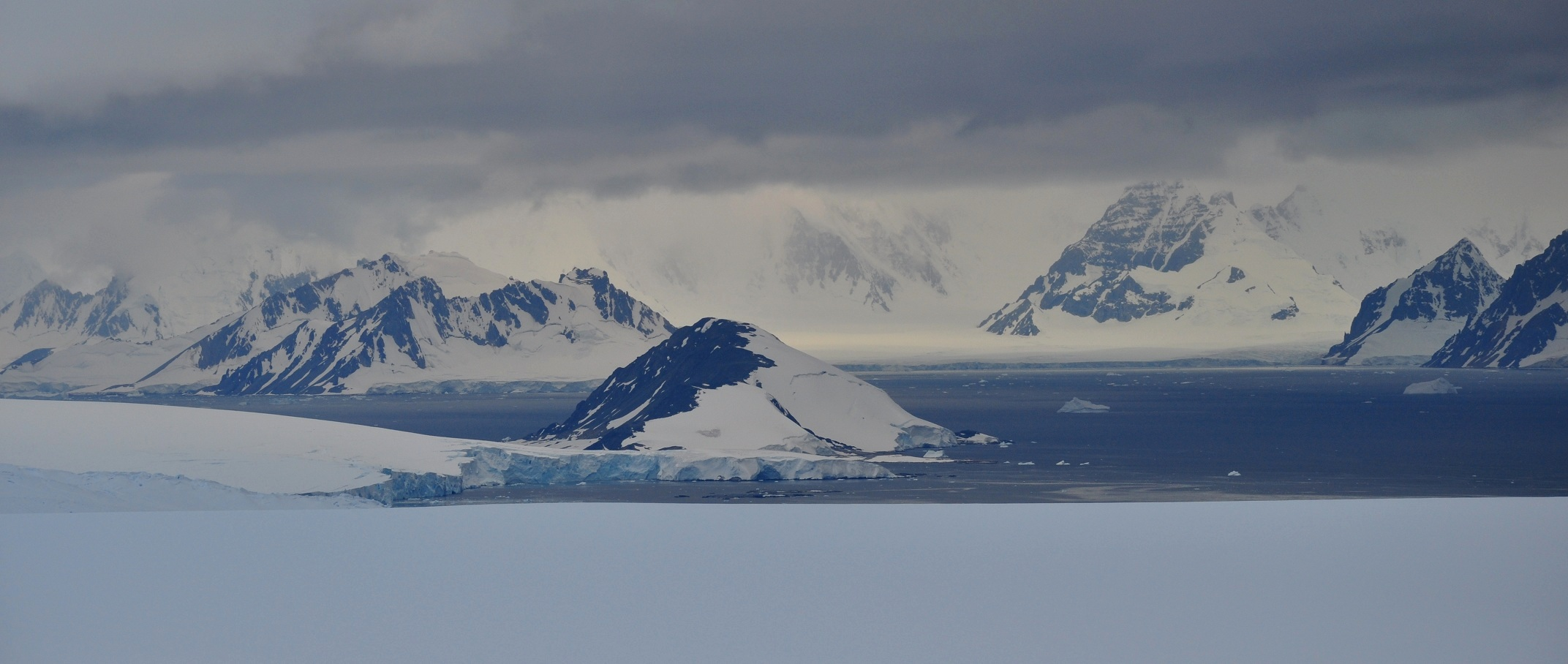
Typical landscape for the Antarctic Peninsula area, with fjords, high coastal mountains and islands. Click on the image for geographical details.

West Antarctica is the smaller part of the continent, (50° – 180°W), divided into:

=== Areas ===
- Antarctic Peninsula (55° – 75°W)
  - Graham Land
  - Palmer Land
- Queen Elizabeth Land (20°W – 80°W)
- Ellsworth Land (79°45' – 103°24'W)
  - English Coast
  - Bryan Coast
  - Eights Coast
- Marie Byrd Land (103°24' – 158°W)
  - Walgreen Coast
  - Bakutis Coast
  - Hobbs Coast
  - Ruppert Coast
  - Saunders Coast
- King Edward VII Land (166°E – 155°W)
  - Shirase Coast

=== Seas ===
- Scotia Sea (26°30' – 65°W)
- Weddell Sea (57°18' – 102°20'W)
- Bellingshausen Sea (57°18' – 102°20'W)
- Amundsen Sea (102°20′ – 126°W)

=== Ice shelves ===
Larger ice shelves are:

- Filchner-Ronne Ice Shelf (30° – 83°W)
- Larsen Ice Shelf
- Abbot Ice Shelf (89°35' – 103°W)
- Getz Ice Shelf (114°30' – 136°W)
- Sulzberger Ice Shelf
- Ross Ice Shelf (166°E – 155°W)

For all ice shelves see List of Antarctic ice shelves.

=== Islands ===
For a list of all Antarctic islands see List of Antarctic and sub-Antarctic islands.

== East Antarctica ==
East Antarctica on the right.

East Antarctica is the larger part of the continent, (50°W – 180°E), both the South Magnetic Pole and geographic South Pole are situated here. Divided into:

=== Areas ===
- Coats Land (20° – 36°W)
- Queen Maud Land (20°W – 45°E)
  - Princess Martha Coast
  - Princess Astrid Coast
  - Princess Ragnhild Coast
  - Prince Harald Coast
  - Prince Olav Coast
- Enderby Land (44°38' – 56°25'E)
- Kemp Land (56°25' – 59°34'E)
- Mac. Robertson Land (59°34' – 73°E)
- Princess Elizabeth Land (73° – 87°43'E)
- Wilhelm II Land (87°43' – 91°54'E)
- Queen Mary Land (91°54' – 100°30'E)
- Wilkes Land (100°31' – 136°11'E)
- Adélie Land (136°11′ – 142°02′E)
- George V Land (142°02' – 153°45'E)
  - George V Coast
  - Zélée Subglacial Trench
- Oates Land (153°45' – 160°E)
- Victoria Land (70°30' – 78°'S)

=== Seas ===
- Weddell Sea (57°18' – 102°20'W)
- King Haakon VII Sea (20°W – 45°E)
- Davis Sea (82° – 96°E)
- Mawson Sea (95°45' – 113°E)
- D'Urville Sea (140°E)
- Ross Sea (166°E – 155°W)
- Bellingshausen Sea (57°18' – 102°20'W)
- Scotia Sea (26°30' – 65°W)

=== Ice shelves ===
Larger ice shelves are:

- Riiser-Larsen Ice Shelf
- Ekstrom Ice Shelf
- Amery Ice Shelf
- West Ice Shelf
- Shackleton Ice Shelf
- Voyeykov Ice Shelf

For all ice shelves see List of Antarctic ice shelves.

=== Islands ===
For a list of all Antarctic islands see List of Antarctic and sub-Antarctic islands.

== Territorial landclaims ==
Seven nations have made official Territorial claims in Antarctica.

== Dependences and territories ==
- Bouvet Island
- French Southern and Antarctic Lands
- Heard and McDonald Islands
- South Georgia and the South Sandwich Islands
- Peter I Island

== See also ==
- Bibliography of Antarctica
- List of Antarctic and Subantarctic islands
- Geology of Antarctica
