= Stange Sound =

Body of water in Antarctica

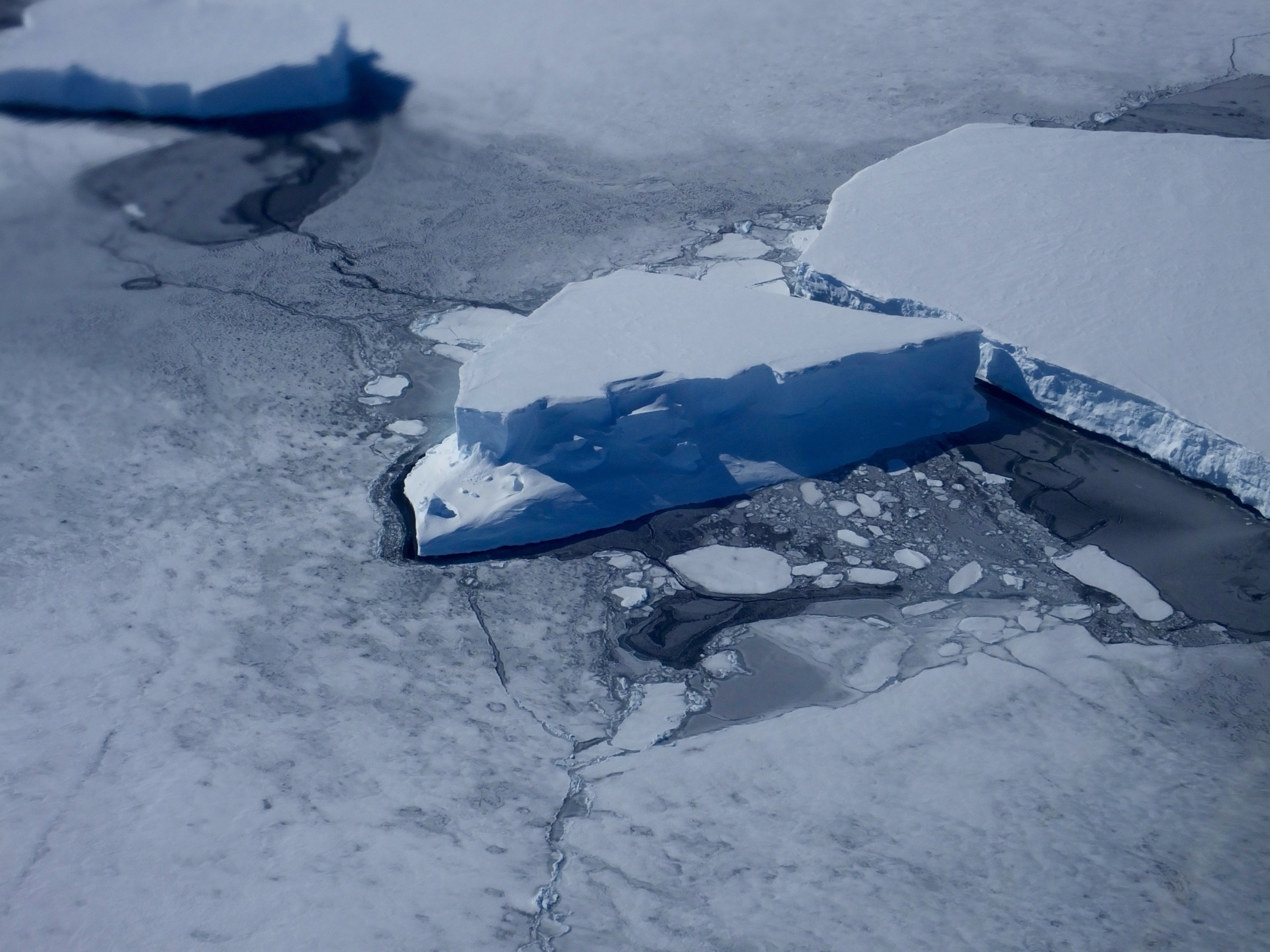
- Icebergs in Stange Sound

- Location within Antarctica
- Location: Ellsworth Land, Antarctica
- Coordinates: 73°10′S 76°40′W
- Type: Inlet
- Ocean/sea sources: Bellingshausen Sea

Stange Sound (73°10′S 76°40′W) is a sound about 60 nautical miles (110 km; 69 mi) long and 25 nautical miles (46 km; 29 mi) wide along the coast of Ellsworth Land, Antarctica. An ice shelf occupies the sound, which is bounded on the west by Smyley Island and Case Island, on the south by the mainland, on the east by Spaatz Island and on the north by open water in the Ronne Entrance. Photographed from the air and roughly plotted by the Ronne Antarctic Research Expedition (RARE. 1947-48) under Finn Ronne. Named for Henry Stange of New York, a contributor to RARE who gave much time to assisting in preparations for the expedition.

== Location ==
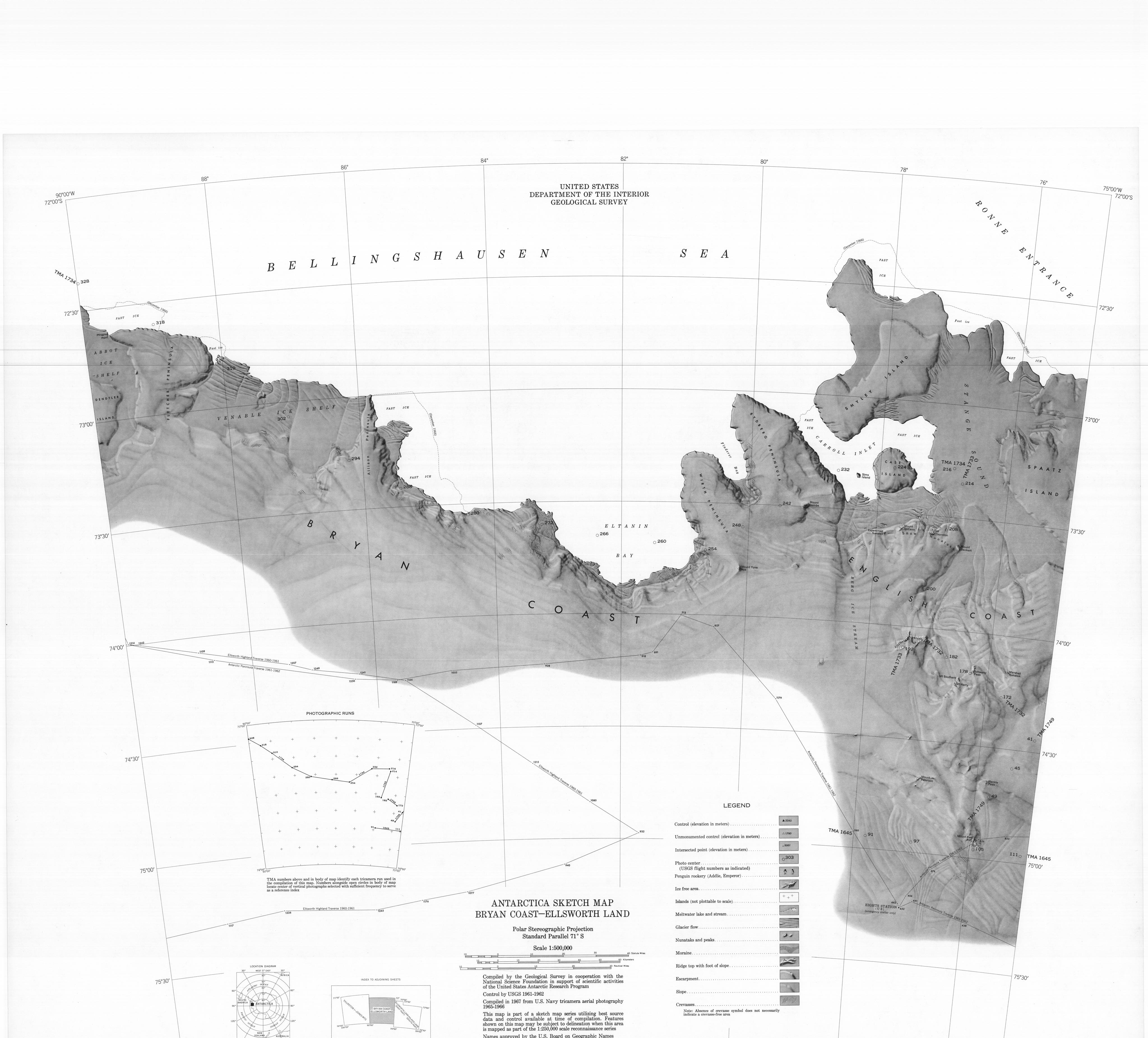
Carroll Inlet in northeast of map

Stange Sound is on the English Coast of Ellsworth Land. It is largely ice-covered. It adjoins Carroll Inlet to the west and Ronne Entrance to the north and east, from which it is separated by Spaatz Island. Hill Glacier flows into the sound from Spaatz Island.

== Features ==
=== Stange Ice Shelf ===
73°15′S 76°30′W. The ice shelf in Stange Sound, English Coast, bounded to the east by Spaatz Island, to the northwest by Smyley Island, and to the west by fast ice in Carroll Inlet. Named in association with Stange Sound.

=== Spaatz Island ===
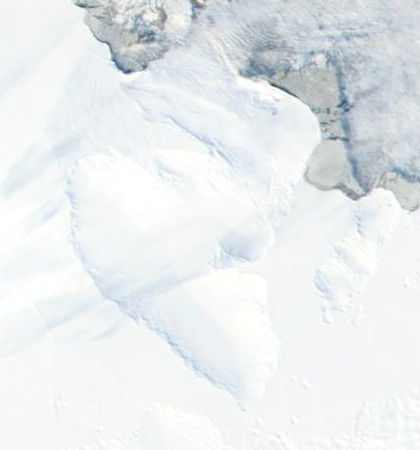
March 2002 satellite photograph of Spaatz Island

73°12′S 75°00′W. A high ice-covered island, 50 nautical miles (93 km; 58 mi) long and 25 nautical miles (46 km; 29 mi) wide, lying close to the coast of Ellsworth Land, 30 nautical miles (56 km; 35 mi) east of Smyley Island. The north side of the island forms a portion of the south margin of Ronne Entrance. The remainder of the island is surrounded by the ice shelves of Stange Sound and George VI Sound. Finn Ronne and Carl Eklund of the US AS (1939–41) sledged along the north side of this feature in December 1940. It was photographed from the air and first mapped as an island by the RARE (1947-48) under Finn Ronne. Named by Ronne for Gen. Carl Spaatz, Chief of Staff, United States ArmyAF, who gave assistance in providing an airplane for use of RARE.

=== Ronne Entrance ===
72°30′S 74°00′W. Broad southwest entrance of George VI Sound where it opens on Bellingshausen Sea at the southwest side of Alexander Island. Discovered on a sledge journey through the sound in December 1940 by Finn Ronne and Carl Eklund of the USAS, 1939–41, and named Ronne Bay. Since 1940, the head of the bay has receded eastward into George VI Sound, altering the relationships on which the name was based. The name was therefore changed to Ronne Entrance, in keeping with the physical characteristics of the feature. Named after the Ronne family, of which the father, Martin Ronne, was a member of the Norwegian expedition under Amundsen, 1910-12, and the ByrdAE, 1928-30; and the son, Finn Ronne (d.1980), was a member of the ByrdAE, 1933-35, and the USAS, 1939-41. Finn Ronne also served as leader of the RARE, 1947^48, and as military and scientific leader at Ellsworth Station during the IGY, 1957.

=== Hill Glacier ===
73°03′S 75°40′W. A broad glacier that drains the west-central part of Spaatz Island, at the south side of Ronne Entrance. Mapped by USGS from surveys and United States Navy aerial photographs, 1961-66. Named by US-ACAN for Lennie J. Hill, USGS Topographic Engineer, a member of the Marie Byrd Land Survey Party, 1967-68.

=== Lidke Ice Stream ===
73°30′S 76°30′W. An ice stream about 25 nautical miles (46 km; 29 mi) long flowing north into Stange Sound, east of Mount Benkert. Mapped by USGS from surveys and United States Navy aerial photographs, 1961-66. The ice stream was first visited by a USGS field party in January 1985. Named by US-ACAN after David J. Lidke, USGS geologist, a member of the party.

=== Hall Glacier ===
73.9°S 76.3833333°W A glacier flowing north between Lidke Ice Stream and Nikitin Glacier into Stange Sound. Named by US-ACAN (2006) after Dann V. Hall, United States Geological Survey (USGS) surveyor in support of the Ross Ice Shelf Project, 1976-77; team member, joint United States Geological Survey (USGS)-British Antarctic Survey (BAS) Doppler Landsat Control Project, 1977-78, via twin otter aircraft and ship to discrete positions at Haag Nunataks, Orville Coast, Antarctic Peninsula, Ronne Ice Shelf, Filchner Ice Shelf, Lyddan Island, Theron Mountains, Deception Island, Signy Island, Bird Island and South Georgia.

=== Nikitin Glacier ===
73.8°S 75.6°W A glacier flowing north into Stange Sound, English Coast, eastward of Lidke Ice Stream and an unnamed intervening glacier. Named by the USSR Academy of Sciences (1987) after Afanasiy Nikitin (died 1472), a Russian traveller who documented a visit to India and Africa during the years 1466-72.

== Sources ==
- This article incorporates public domain material from websites or documents of the United States Geological Survey.
- Alberts, Fred G., ed. (1995), Geographic Names of the Antarctic (PDF) (2 ed.), United States Board on Geographic Names This article incorporates public domain material from websites or documents of the United States Board on Geographic Names.
- Bryan Coast to Ellsworth Land, USGS: United States Geological Survey
- "Hall Glacier", Geographic Names Information System, United States Geological Survey, United States Department of the Interior
- "Nikitin Glacier", Geographic Names Information System, United States Geological Survey, United States Department of the Interior
