= Jones Mountains =

Mountain range in Antarctica

- Location within Antarctica

Geography
- Location: Ellsworth Land, Antarctica
- Range coordinates: 73°32′S 94°00′W

The Jones Mountains (73°32′S 94°00′W) are an isolated group of mountains, trending generally east–west for 27 nautical miles (50 km; 31 mi), situated on the Eights Coast, Ellsworth Land, Antarctica, about 50 nautical miles (93 km; 58 mi) south of Dustin Island.

== Location ==
Thurston Island in north of map

The Jones Mountains lie to the south of the Eights Coast, south of the Abbot Ice Shelf and southeast of Thurston Island. Features of the southern part include, from west to east, Miller Crag, Sutley Peak, Walk Glacier, Forbidden Rocks and Christoffersen Heights. Features of the northern part include, from west to east, Pillsbury Tower, Bonnabeau Dome, Cache Heights, Inspiration Rocks, Gopher Glacier, Anderson Dome and Mount Loweth.

== Discovery and naming ==
The charts of the United States Antarctic Service (USAS), 1939–41, show mountains in this approximate location and relationship to Dustin and Thurston Islands, indicating they were sighted in the flight from the ship Bear, 27 February 1940. The mountains appear in distant air photos taken by United States Navy Operation Highjump, 30 December 1946, and were observed from United States Navy aircraft by Edward Thiel and J. Campbell Craddock on 22 January 1960. The naming was proposed by Thiel and Craddock after Dr. Thomas O. Jones (1908–93), American chemist; senior National Science Foundation (NSF) official in charge of the United States Antarctic Research Program (USARP), 1958–78; Director, Division of Environmental Science, NSF, 1965–69; Deputy Assistant Director for National and International Programs, NSF, 1969–78.

== Southern features ==
=== Miller Crag ===
73°40′S 94°42′W. A bold and conspicuous outcropping of bare rock 1,450 metres (4,760 ft) high, standing 3 nautical miles (5.6 km; 3.5 mi) west-southwest of Sutley Peak in the west extremity of the Jones Mountains. Mapped by the University of Minnesota-Jones Mountains Party, 1960-61, who named it for Thomas P. Miller, geologist with the party.

=== Sayen Rocks ===
73°40′S 94°37′W. Two small rock exposures, visible from northward, situated near the crest of the ice-covered heights between Miller Crag and Sutley Peak. Mapped by the University of Minnesota-Jones Mountains Party, 1960-61. Named by the United States Advisory Committee on Antarctic Names (US-ACAN) for L.D. Sayen, photographer of United States Navy Squadron VX-6, who took part in photographing the Jones Mountains in January 1961.

=== Wright Peak ===
73°40′S 94°32′W. Small rock Peak 1,510 metres (4,950 ft) high located 0.5 nautical miles (0.93 km; 0.58 mi) south of Sutley Peak. Mapped by the University of Minnesota-Jones Mountains Party, 1960-61, which named it for Herbert E. Wright, Jr., glacial geologist, University of Minnesota, who was advisor to the party and visited Antarctica in the 1961-62 season.

=== Sutley Peak ===
73°39′S 94°32′W. Rock peak 1,400 metres (4,600 ft) high located just north of Wright Peak and 3 nautical miles (5.6 km; 3.5 mi) east-northeast of Miller Crag. Mapped by the University of Minnesota-Jones Mountains Party, 1960-61. Named by US-ACAN for Lieutenant Commander Robert M. Sutley, United States Navy, Executive Officer of Mobile Construction Battalion One on United States Navy OpDFrz 1962.

=== Walk Glacier ===
73°38′S 94°18′W. A glacier descending westward from Christoffersen Heights, to the south of Forbidden Rocks. Mapped by the University of Minnesota-Jones Mountains Party, 1960-61. Named by US-ACAN for Lieutenant Donald R. Walk, United States Navy, medical officer and officer in charge of Byrd Station, 1961.

=== Farrington Ridge ===
73°35′S 94°20′W. An isolated linear ridge, 1.5 nautical miles (2.8 km; 1.7 mi) long, with continuous rock exposure along the crest, located 2 nautical miles (3.7 km; 2.3 mi) north-northwest of Forbidden Rocks. Mapped by the University of MinnesotaJones Mountains Party, 1960-61, who named it for Lieutenant Robert L. Farrington, United States Navy, co-pilot of the LC-47 Dakota aircraft that made the first landing in the Jones Mountains, 9 December 1960.

=== Christmas Cliffs ===
73°33′S 94°17′W. South-facing cliffs with two prominent rock outcrops, located 2 nautical miles (3.7 km; 2.3 mi) south-southeast of Pillsbury Tower. Mapped by the University of Minnesota-Jones Mountains Party, 1960-61, and so named by the party because the cliffs were visited on Christmas Day, 1960.

=== Prism Ridge ===
73°33′S 94°14′W. A small ridge with bare rock outcroppings located just north of Haskell Glacier and 2 nautical miles (3.7 km; 2.3 mi) south-southwest of Bonnabeau Dome. Mapped and named by the University of Minnesota–Jones Mountains Party, 1960-61. They found a large block of ice in the shape of a square prism standing as an isolated feature at the south end of this ridge.

=== Haskell Glacier ===
73°34′S 94°13′W. A small glacier descending from Christoffersen Heights and draining west between Prism Ridge and Forbidden Rocks. Mapped by the University of Minnesota-Jones Mountains Party, 1960-61. Named by US-ACAN for Lieutenant Hugh B. Haskell, United States Navy, co-pilot on a pioneer flight of 25 November 1961 from Byrd Station to establish Sky-High Camp (later Eights Station) at 75°14'S, 77°06'W.

=== Forbidden Rocks ===
73°36′S 94°12′W. Linear rock outcrops, 1 nautical mile (1.9 km; 1.2 mi) long, located on the west edge of Christoffersen Heights and between Haskell and Walk Glaciers. Mapped by the University of Minnesota–Jones Mountains Party, 1960-61. So named by the party because the rocks were inaccessible from their northwest approach because of crevasse fields.

=== Christoffersen Heights ===
73°36′S 93°54′W. Broad snow-covered heights which form the south-central portion of the Jones Mountains, southward of Bonnabeau and Anderson Domes. Mapped by the University of Minnesota-Jones Mountains Party, 1960-61. Named by US-ACAN for Lieutenant Ernest H. Christoffersen, United States Navy Reserve, co-pilot of ski-equipped LC-47 Dakota aircraft on pioneering flights from Byrd Station to the Eights Coast area in November 1961.

== Northwest features ==
=== Snowplume Peak ===
73°32′S 94°27′W. A small pyramidal peak along the north front of the Jones Mountains, located 0.75 nautical miles (1.39 km; 0.86 mi) west-southwest of Rightangle Peak and 2 nautical miles (3.7 km; 2.3 mi) west-southwest of Pillsbury Tower. Mapped by the University of Minnesota-Jones Mountains Party, 1960-61. So named by the party because a continual plume of wind-blown snow trails off the peak whenever the wind blows.

=== Rightangle Peak ===
73°31′S 94°25′W. A small rock peak between Snowplume Peak and Camelback Ridge. Mapped by the University of Minnesota-Jones Mountains Party, 1960-61. So named by the party because the feature presented a right angle profile facing west when viewed from Camp Minnesota (from northward).

=== Camelback Ridge ===
73°31′S 94°24′W. A short rock ridge with topographic highs of 1,180 and 1,141 metres (3,871 and 3,743 ft) at the ends, located just west of Pemmican Bluff. Mapped by the University of Minnesota-Jones Mountains Party, 1960-61, who named it for its humped appearance.

=== Pemmican Bluff ===
73°31′S 94°22′W. A short but prominent bluff with steep rock north face and sloping snow south slope. It overlooks the west side of upper Basecamp Valley just west of Pillsbury Tower. Mapped by the University of Minnesota-Jones Mountains Party, 1960-61. So named by this party because the bluff is composed of complex volcanic rocks giving the north face a very mottled appearance similar to the pemmican eaten in the field.

=== Pillsbury Tower ===
73°31′S 94°20′W. A remnant volcanic cone, 1,295 metres (4,249 ft) high, with a shear north-facing rock cliff and a gradual slope at the south side, standing directly at the base of Avalanche Ridge. With its dark rock rising 100 metres (330 ft) high above the surrounding area, it is clearly the most prominent landmark in these mountains. Mapped by the University of Minnesota-Jones Mountains Party, 1960-61, and named by them after Pillsbury Hall which houses the Dept. of Geology at the University of Minnesota.

=== Intrusive Spur ===
73°30′S 94°25′W. A rock spur along the north front of the Jones Mountains, 1 nautical mile (1.9 km; 1.2 mi) west of Avalanche Ridge. Mapped by the University of Minnesota-Jones Mountains Party, 1960-61. So named by the party because the intrusive complex of the basement rocks of the Jones Mountains is well exposed on the spur.

=== Granite Spur ===
73°30′S 94°24′W. A rock spur along the north front of the Jones Mountains, 0.5 nautical miles (0.93 km; 0.58 mi) west of Avalanche Ridge. Mapped by the University of MinnesotaJones Mountains Party, 1960-61. So named by the party because the basement granite is well exposed here.

=== Basecamp Valley ===
73°30′S 94°22′W. A small ice-filled valley at the west side of Avalanche Ridge.. Mapped and named by the University of Minnesota-Jones Mountains Party, 1960-61, who established a base camp, "Camp Minnesota," just north of the mouth of this valley.

=== Avalanche Ridge ===
73°30′S 94°22′W. A linear rock ridge, 1 nautical mile (1.9 km; 1.2 mi) long, extending north from Pillsbury Tower and separating Basecamp Valley from Austin Valley, in the Jones Mountains. Mapped by the University of Minnesota-Jones Mountains Party, 1960-61, and so named by them because of the continual avalanching of snow off the flanks of the ridge.

=== Austin Valley ===
73°30′S 94°21′W. (Note: The coordinates for Austin Valley (73°30′S 93°21′W) given by Alberts, 1995, do not match the description "at the east side of Avalanche Ridge" (73°30′S 94°22′W). Coordinates of 73°30′S 94°21′W seem a better fit.) A small ice-filled valley at the east side of Avalanche Ridge. Mapped by the University of Minnesota-Jones Mountains Party, 1960-61. Named by US-ACAN for Jerry W. Austin, aviation machinist's mate of United States Navy Squadron VX-6, a crew member on pioneering flights of LC-47 Dakota aircraft from Byrd Station to the Eights Coast area in November 1961.

=== Greenstone Point ===
73°30′S 94°19′W. High rock spur along the north front of the Jones Mountains, immediately east of Austin Valley. Mapped by the University of Minnesota-Jones Mountains Party, 1960-61. So named by the party because of the greenish color of the rock.

=== Hughes Point ===
73°30′S 94°16′W. Steep rock point on the west side of the terminus of Exum Glacier. Mapped by the University of MinnesotaJones Mountains Party, 1960-61, and named by them for Wayne B. Hughes, Assistant USARP Representative at McMurdo Station, 1960-61.

=== Exum Glacier ===
73°30′S 94°14′W. Small glacier flowing north between Hughes Point and Bonnabeau Dome. Mapped by the University of Minnesota-Jones Mountains Party, 1960-61. Named by the party for Glenn Exum, mountaineer, who provided training in rock and ice climbing for the University of Minnesota field parties of 1960-61 and 1961-62.

=== Bonnabeau Dome ===
73°31′S 94°10′W. A prominent ice-covered dome mountain rising on the west side of Gopher Glacier, 4 nautical miles (7.4 km; 4.6 mi) west of similar-appearing Anderson Dome. Mapped by the University of MinnesotaJones Mountains Party, 1960-61. Named by them for Doctor Raymond C. Bonnabeau, Jr., medical doctor with the party.

== Northeast features ==
=== Cache Heights ===
73°27′S 94°06′W. Broad snow-covered heights about 3 nautical miles (5.6 km; 3.5 mi) long and 2 nautical miles (3.7 km; 2.3 mi) wide, located just northeast of Bonnabeau Dome. Much lower than Bonnabeau Dome, the heights rise considerably above the adjacent ice surface. Mapped and named by the University of Minnesota-Jones Mountains Party, 1960-61. A food cache placed here by the party during a blizzard was never recovered.

=== Inspiration Rocks ===
73°26′S 94°05′W. A group of rock outcrops at the north edge of Cache Heights. Mapped by the University of Minnesota-Jones Mountains Party, 1960-61. So named by the party because from these rocks almost the entire Jones Mountains come into view.

=== Gopher Glacier ===
73°28′S 94°00′W. A glacier descending from Christoffersen Heights and draining north between Bonnabeau and Anderson Domes. Mapped and named by the University of Minnesota-Jones Mountains Party, 1960-61. Gopher is the nickname of the University of Minnesota and of the State.

=== Snyder Peak ===
73°31′S 93°56′W. A low ice-covered peak lying 1 nautical mile (1.9 km; 1.2 mi) southwest of Anderson Dome. Mapped by the University of Minnesota-Jones Mountains Party, 1960-61. Named by US-ACAN for David Snyder, aviation electronics technician with United States Navy Squadron VX-6, crew member on pioneer flights of LC-47 Dakota aircraft from Byrd Station to the Eights Coast area in November 1961.

=== Anderson Dome ===
73°30′S 93°54′W. A prominent ice-covered dome mountain 1,475 metres (4,839 ft) high rising on the east side of Gopher Glacier, 4 nautical miles (7.4 km; 4.6 mi) east of similar-appearing Bonnabeau Dome. Mapped by the University, of Minnesota-Jones Mountains Party, 1960-61, and named by them for Joe M. Anderson, USGS topographic engineer with the party.

=== Rice Ridge ===
73°27′S 93°50′W. A low ridge with rocky exposures, 1 nautical mile (1.9 km; 1.2 mi) long, which extends from the north side of Anderson Dome. Mapped by the University of Minnesota-Jones Mountains Party, 1960-61. Named by US-ACAN for Lieutenant Commander Robert A. Rice, United States Navy, Supply and Fiscal Officer of Mobile Construction Battalion One on United States Navy OpDFrz 1962.

=== Eubanks Point ===
73°27′S 93°38′W. A point with steep ice-covered slopes which is marked by a rock exposure on the northeast face, located 2 nautical miles (3.7 km; 2.3 mi) west-southwest of the summit of Mount Loweth. Mapped by the University of Minnesota-Jones Mountains Party, 1960-61. Named by US-ACAN for Staff Sergeant Leroy E. Eubanks, USMC, navigator with United States Navy Squadron VX-6, who participated in pioneering flights of LC-47 Dakota aircraft from Byrd Station to the Eights Coast area in November 1961.

=== Rockfall Cliff ===
73°26′S 93°34′W. A conspicuous rock cliff which marks the northwest face of Mount Loweth. Mapped by the University of Minnesota-Jones Mountains Party, 1960-61, and so named by them because the continual falling of rocks made examination of the area hazardous.

=== Pond Ridge ===
73°25′S 93°33′W. A flattish rock ridge which extends north from Mount Loweth. Mapped by the University of Minnesota-Jones Mountains Party, 1960-61, and so named by them because a small pond was discovered on the ridge.

=== Mount Loweth ===
73°26′S 93°31′W. A snow-topped mountain 1,420 metres (4,660 ft) high with a steep rock cliff on the north side, located 6 nautical miles (11 km; 6.9 mi) east-northeast of Anderson Dome in the east end of the Jones Mountains. Mapped by the University of Minnesota-Jones Mountains Party, 1960-61. Named by US-ACAN for Hugh F. Loweth, Executive Offices of the President, who for some years was instrumental in the development and guidance of United States science policies and programs for Antarctica.

== Sources ==
- Alberts, Fred G., ed. (1995), Geographic Names of the Antarctic (PDF) (2 ed.), United States Board on Geographic Names This article incorporates public domain material from websites or documents of the United States Board on Geographic Names.
- Thurston Island to Jones Mountains (PDF), USGS: United States Geological Survey
- This article incorporates public domain material from websites or documents of the United States Geological Survey.
