= FitzGerald Bluffs =

Bluffs in Antarctica

- Location within Antarctica

Geography
- Continent: Antarctica
- Range coordinates: 74°3′S 77°20′W

The FitzGerald Bluffs (74°3′S 77°20′W) are prominent north-facing bluffs, 9 nautical miles (17 km; 10 mi) long, located 30 nautical miles (56 km; 35 mi) south of the Snow Nunataks in Ellsworth Land, Antarctica.

== Location ==
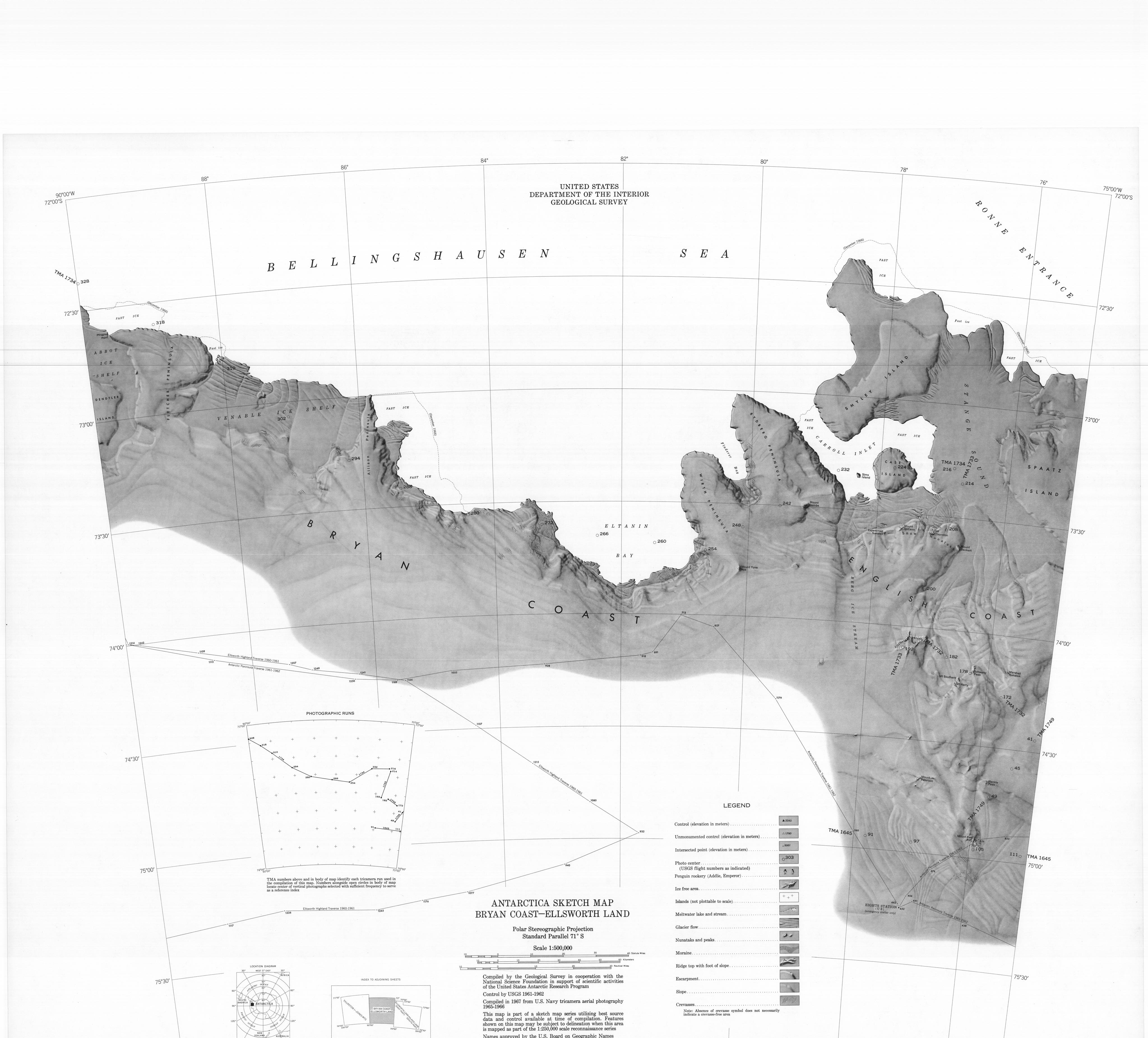
FitzGerald Bluffs in center of east of map

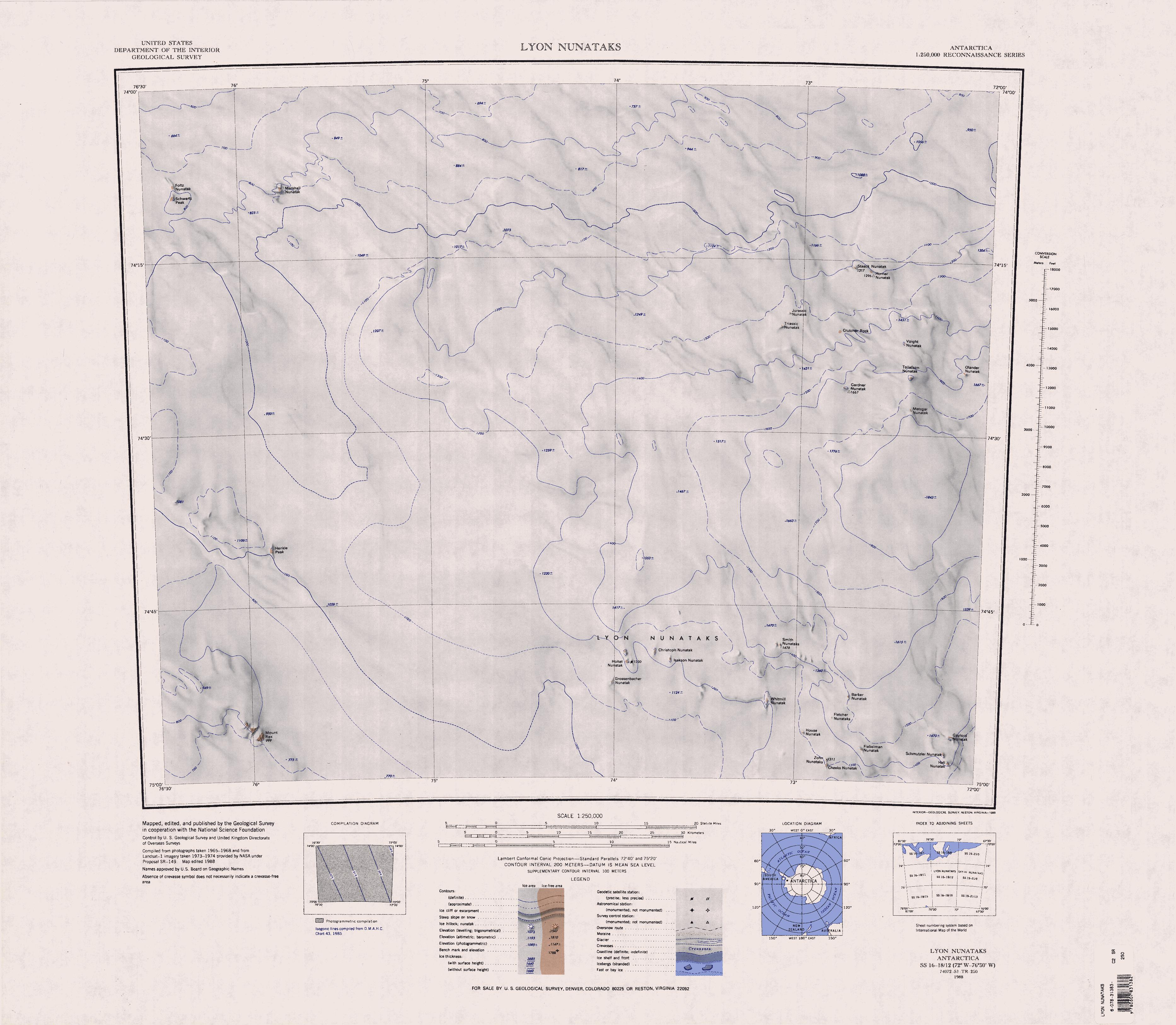
Some southeast features in northwest of map

The Fitzgerald Bluffs overlook the English Coast to the north in Ellsworth Land. They are south of the Snow Nunataks and east of the Berg Ice Stream. Features to the southeast include Mount Southern, Mount Harry, Folz Nunatak, Schwartz Peak and Marshall Nunatak. The isolated Mount Peterson is to the south.

== Discovery and name ==
The FitzGerald Bluffs were discovered by the Ronne Antarctic Research Expedition (RARE; 1947–48) under Finn Ronne, who named the bluffs after Gerald FitzGerald, Chief Topographic Engineer with the United States Geological Survey (USGS), 1947–57.

== O'Neill Peak ==
74°05′S 77°14′W The highest point, about 850 metres (2,790 ft) of FitzGerald Bluffs. Following geological work in the area by a USGS field party in Dec. 1984, named by US-ACAN after John M. O'Neill, USGS geologist, a member of the field party.

== Southeast features ==
=== Mount Southern ===
74°12′S 76°28′W. A small mountain, or nunatak, located 1.5 nautical miles (2.8 km; 1.7 mi) northeast of Mount Harry and 14 nautical miles (26 km; 16 mi) southeast of FitzGerald Bluffs. Discovered and photographed by Lincoln Ellsworth on November 23, 1935. Mapped by USGS from surveys and United States Navy air photos, 1961-66. Named by the United States Advisory Committee on Antarctic Names (US-ACAN) for Merle E. Southern, USGS Topographic Engineer in Antarctica, 1967-68.

=== Mount Harry ===
74°14′S 76°32′W. A mountain 14 nautical miles (26 km; 16 mi) southeast of FitzGerald Bluffs. It is westernmost in a chain of small summits lying southeastward of the bluffs. The feature lies within a group of nunataks photographed by Lincoln Ellsworth on November 23, 1935. It was mapped by USGS from surveys and United States Navy aerial photographs, 1961-66. Named by US-ACAN for Jack L. Harry, USGS Topographic Engineer, a member of the Marie Byrd Land Survey Party, 1967-68.

=== Foltz Nunatak ===
74°08′S 76°20′W. A nunatak rising to about 800 metres (2,600 ft) high, 1 nautical mile (1.9 km; 1.2 mi) north of Schwartz Peak. The feature is part of a nunatak group discovered and photographed from the air by Lincoln Ellsworth in November 1935. Mapped by USGS from surveys and United States Navy aerial photographs, 1961–68, and from Landsat imagery taken 1973-74. Named by US-ACAN in 1987 after Gary F. Foltz, USGS cartographic technician, a member of USGS satellite surveying teams at the South Pole Station during two winter periods, 1978 and 1984.

=== Schwartz Peak ===
74°10′S 76°15′W. A rock peak 15 nautical miles (28 km; 17 mi) east-southeast of FitzGerald Bluffs in Ellsworth Land. The peak is one in a chain of small summits lying southeastward of the bluffs and is the dominant feature near the center of the group. It was discovered and photographed on November 23, 1935 by Lincoln Ellsworth. Mapped by USGS from surveys and United States Navy air photos, 1961-66. Named by US-ACAN for Bruce L. Schwartz, USGS Topographic Engineer in Antarctica, 1967-68.

=== Marshall Nunatak ===
74°10′S 75°41′W. A somewhat isolated rock nunatak, 23 nautical miles (43 km; 26 mi) east-southeast of FitzGerald Bluffs in Ellsworth Land. It lies 9 nautical miles (17 km; 10 mi) east of Schwartz Peak and is the easternmost member in the chain of small summits located southeast of the bluffs. Mapped by USGS from surveys and United States Navy air photos, 1961-66. Named by US-ACAN for William F; Marshall, USGS Topographic Engineer in Antarctica, 1967-68.

=== Mount Peterson ===
74°40′S 76°59′W. A small mountain rising above the ice surface 22 nautical miles (41 km; 25 mi) northwest of Mount Rex, Ellsworth Land. The feature lies within a group of nunataks first sighted and photographed on November 23, 1935 by Lincoln Ellsworth. The area was explored by the RARE (1947–48) under Finn Ronne, who named the mountain for Harries-Clichy Peterson, physicist with the expedition.

== Sources ==
- Alberts, Fred G., ed. (1995), Geographic Names of the Antarctic (PDF) (2 ed.), United States Board on Geographic Names This article incorporates public domain material from websites or documents of the United States Board on Geographic Names.
- Bryan Coast to Ellsworth Land, USGS: United States Geological Survey
- Lyon Nunataks, USGS: United States Geological Survey

This article incorporates public domain material from websites or documents of the United States Geological Survey.
