= Admiral Abbot =

Admiral Abbot may refer to:

- Charles Abbot, 2nd Baron Colchester (1798–1867), British Royal Navy admiral
- Charles S. Abbot (born 1945), U.S. Navy admiral
- James Lloyd Abbot Jr. (1918–2012), U.S. Navy rear admiral
- Peter Abbott (1942–2015), British Royal Navy admiral
