= Goodell Glacier =

Glacier in Antarctica

- Location within Antarctica
- Location: Ellsworth Land
- Coordinates: 72°55′00″S 88°30′00″W
- Length: 5 nautical miles (9.3 km; 5.8 mi)
- Thickness: unknown
- Terminus: Williams Ice Stream
- Status: unknown

Goodell Glacier (72°55′S 88°30′W) is a glacier about 5 nautical miles (9.3 km; 5.8 mi) long flowing east and north from Fletcher Peninsula into the Williams Ice Stream, Antarctica. It was named by the Advisory Committee on Antarctic Names after Janice G. Goodell of the United States Geological Survey, Woods Hole, Massachusetts, a support member of the Glacier Studies Project Team from the early 1990s onwards.

== See also ==
- List of glaciers in the Antarctic
- Glaciology
