= Bellingshausen =

Bellingshausen may refer to:

- Fabian Gottlieb von Bellingshausen (1778–1852), Baltic German explorer and officer in the Russian navy, after whom are named:
  - Bellingshausen Plate, a tectonic plate
  - Bellingshausen Sea, off the Antarctic Peninsula of Antarctica
  - Bellingshausen Plain, an undersea plain of the Bellingshausen Sea
  - Mount Bellingshausen, Antarctica
  - Bellingshausen Island in the South Sandwich Islands
  - Bellinghausen or Bellingshausen, an atoll in the Society Islands, also known as Motu One
  - Bellingshausen Point, South Georgia
  - Bellingshausen Station, a Russian base on King George Island, Antarctica
  - 3659 Bellingshausen, an asteroid
  - Bellinsgauzen (crater), a lunar crater

== See also ==
- Bellinghausen (disambiguation)
