= Pfrogner Point =

Coordinates: 72°37′S 89°35′W

Pfrogner Point is an ice-covered point on the northwest extension of Fletcher Peninsula in Antarctica; it is partially encompassed by the Abbot Ice Shelf. The point marks the division of Eights Coast and Bryan Coast. Mapped by the United States Geological Survey from surveys and U.S. Navy air photos, 1961–66. It was named by the Advisory Committee on Antarctic Names for Ray L. Pfrogner, United States Antarctic Program geomagnetist-seismologist at Byrd Station, 1961–62.
