= Zélée =

Zélée may refer to:

- Zélée Glacier, a glacier in Antarctica
- Zélée Rocks, a group of rocks in Bransfield Strait off the north tip of Antarctic Peninsula
- Zélée Subglacial Trench, a subglacial valley on George V Coast off Antarctica
- French gunboat Zélée, a French Navy gunboat sunk in 1914
