= Williams Ice Stream =

Ice stream of Ellsworth Land

Coordinates: 73°15′S 88°27′W

Williams Ice Stream is an ice stream about fifteen miles (24 km) long flowing into Venable Ice Shelf just east of Fletcher Peninsula. Named by Advisory Committee on Antarctic Names (US-ACAN) after Richard S. Williams Jr., senior research geologist, United States Geological Survey (USGS), Woods Hole, Massachusetts, authority in aerial and satellite investigations of geomorphic processes and the fluctuations of glaciers on a global basis, particularly in Iceland and Antarctica; project leader of the team that is compiling 25 Glaciological and Coastal-Change Maps of Antarctica, and that compiled the 1:5,000,000-scale Advanced Very High Resolution Radiometer maps of Antarctica.
