= Haiti Victory and Duke of York Collision =

1953 maritime incident

- Date: 6 May 1953
- Time: c. 04:16 BST
- Location: North of the Strait of Dover, North Sea
- Type: Ship-to-ship collision
- Participants: USNS Haiti Victory; TSS Duke of York
- Outcome: Duke of York found solely responsible in legal proceedings. Both ships later repaired
- Deaths: 8
- Injuries: At least 9

Shortly before dawn on May 6, 1953, just north of the Strait of Dover, the USNS Haiti Victory collided with the overnight ferry TSS Duke of York. The Duke of York was westbound on its regular run between the Hook of Holland (Rotterdam) and Harwich, England (northeast of London). Haiti Victory was northbound, heading for Bremerhaven, Germany. The Haiti Victory sliced into Duke of York's bow, just forward of its bridge. The bow later broke off and sank. Eight of the Duke of York's passengers died; at least nine others were injured.

The Duke was faulted for excessive speed given the weather conditions and found solely responsible for the collision.

== Collision ==
The Haiti Victory was a freighter in the U.S. Navy's Military Sea Transportation Service (MSTS), a Victory ship, 439 feet (134 m) in length, 7,607 tons, with a crew of 50.

The Duke of York was an overnight ferry operated by the British Transportation Commission as part of the British Railway System. She was 339 feet (103 m) long, 4,190 tons. On the night of the collision, the Duke of York carried 437 passengers and a crew of 70.

A cold front was moving across the North Sea, northeast to southwest. While visibility remained good along the English coast, considerable fog had formed along the Dutch coast.

The Haiti Victory picked up the North Sea pilot at Dover at 0117 BST hours and continued on a northerly course. Visibility was excellent. She came abeam of the Galloper light ship about 0414 BST. She altered course to pass behind a crossing vessel then settled on a course of 036 degrees at maximum speed, 17–18 knots (31–33 km/h; 20–21 mph), showing all requisite lights.

Just after 0414 hours, the Haiti Victory's forward lookout and her pilot both heard a fog whistle off the starboard bow. The pilot, unable to see the ship in the darkness, checked his radar and spotted the target off the starboard bow. Still unable to see the ship from the wing of the bridge, he stopped engines (0415 hours). The red (port side) light of the Duke of York then came into sight. Haiti Victory's rudder was put hard right, her engines full astern, and a short blast given on her whistle. The collision occurred at 0416 hours.

The Duke of York had encountered fog since leaving the Hook of Holland. Her bow lookout spotted the Haiti Victory's white (masthead) light off the port bow at the same time that the captain, on the bridge, heard Haiti Victory's whistle. The Duke of York's mate went out on the bridge's port wing and spotted the white light, then the green (starboard side) light. He alerted the captain who had also seen the green light. The captain put the engines on slow, sounded a long blast on her whistle, then ordered “Full astern” and sounded three short blasts. He then ordered, "Hard to starboard. I don’t think we'll clear. Get everybody out." The ships collided as the mate was ringing the general alarm. The Haiti penetrated 31 feet into the port side of the Duke, about 20 feet forward of the bridge.

== Rescue efforts ==
Initial expectations on the Duke of York were that the ferry was in danger of sinking. At 0459 hours, the ferry wire-released, “Standing by to abandon ship”. While the Duke of York's bow did break off, the bulkheads and hatches held and the main portion of the ferry remained afloat.

Some passengers were evacuated in lifeboats. The Haiti Victory repositioned itself alongside the Duke of York, port side to port side, and began taking on the Duke of York's passengers. The Haiti Victory also sent over a rescue crew led by Howard Ridenour, who worked with the Duke of York's second mate, William Bramhill, to free trapped passengers.

At some point on the ferry a "no more to save signal" was given. Ridenour's team returned to the Haiti Victory. In the relative quiet that followed, the ferry's remaining crew heard a call bell ringing and realized there was another trapped passenger, Mary Margaret Ansdell. Ridenour's team was recalled; it took over four hours to free her.

Just after the bow broke away, David Stokes, a junior steward on the Duke of York, squeezed through a port hole and stood on the side of the still floating bow. People called to him to jump. "I can't swim", he answered, and slid down the wreck and into the water. The Duke of York's boatswain, William Albert “Bluey” Warner, saw this and,

[having snatched] up a lifebelt, he swam 300 yards to non-swimmer Stokes, clinging to wreckage. Putting the lifebelt on Stokes, Warner pushed him to the nearest boat. Then he also crawled over wreckage to rescue two passengers.

Warner was awarded the Daily Heralds "Award of Industrial Heroism" in October 1953. In 1968 he was awarded the British Empire Medal. He also received the Royal Medal for life saving at sea from Queen Elizabeth II.

The United States freighter American picked up the Duke of York's lifeboats and took 78 passengers and 12 crew to Dover. Two "stretcher cases" were taken off the American.

The Haiti Victory took 351 of the ferry's passengers and 45 of her crew to Harwich, four of whom were "stretcher cases".

The chief engineer, five volunteers and two doctors from the Haiti Victory transferred to the Duke of York to assist in rescuing Mary Ansdell. The ferry's captain and 14 crew remained with the Duke of York. The Haiti Victory attempted to take the Duke of York in tow but turned that task over to two tugs which towed the ferry to Harwich.

== Fatalities ==
Initial reports were of five fatalities and three missing. The three missing were later added to the count of fatalities. An additional nine injured were included in the petition filed in U.S. District Court on June 18, 1953.

Mary Margaret Ansdell (British), trapped in the wreckage for hours, was evacuated to the hospital in Harwich where she died. In an example of twin telepathy her sister Mary Claire Gaisford St-Lawrence, of Howth Castle Ireland, had a premonition that something terrible had occurred and telephoned their brother Joseph Mostyn who called the Harbour Master in Harwich and was informed of the tragedy before it was publicly known.

Two American women, Gilda Ida Jordet (Colorado) and Berneice Viola Larson (Wisconsin) were returning from a trip to the Middle East with Jordet's sister, Norma Hoyt. Hoyt was trapped in her cabin for several hours. She survived, but her traveling companions did not.

Also among those initially reported killed were Ann Spring (American) and Kurt Wihelm Friedrich Fromm, a German.

Harwich police declared Ferdinand Vodicka (Austrian) to be "missing, believed drowned", on May 9, 1953.

Alice Laucheimer of Hamstead, England, was declared a victim on June 14, 1953.

U.S. Air Force Lt. Dale M. Chaney's body was found in the wreckage June 22, 1953 when the Duke of York was put in dry dock for repairs.

== Legal outcomes ==
The Ministry of Transport completed its inquiry in January 1954. It was decided that a "formal investigation, or public inquiry, should not be ordered."

The jury at the coroner's inquest was told that "no evidence had been forthcoming which would entitle them to apportion the blame.” They returned a verdict of accidental death for the five known fatalities.

=== Haiti Victory exonerated ===
Responsibility for the collision was argued in the U.S. District Court in Newport News, Virginia. Judge Albert V. Bryan handed down his decision on May 5, 1955.

The Duke was running through a ‘patchy’ fog – ‘very thick at times’ and then fairly clear intervals. She was piercing one fog bank after another.... In such weather the speed of the Duke was too fast for good seamanship; it violated the ‘moderate speed’ injunction in the fog rules of Article 16, International Rules.... It was an overriding and major fault; collision was a foreseeable result.

The Haiti was exonerated; the Duke was held solely to blame for the collision.

=== Use of radar ===
The Haiti Victory's mate had used his radar to get the distance from the Galloper light ship shortly before the collision. The British Transportation Commission argued that he should have spotted the Duke on the radar at that time. The judge disagreed:

... he was not looking for anything to starboard; he had no reason to go to the radar to search in any direction. His failure to see the Duke was not negligence, for it was not the result of neglect of an obligation. No obscurity obligated him to use his radar, and there was nothing else to put him on notice of any need for it.

The judge went on to say:

At this point it is well to refer to the Duke's radar. Its use would have avoided the collision and its unavailableness was due to neglect of repair. There was ample warning – a day or two – of its disrepair. Had it been in operation, the situation so urgently demanding its services, omission to use it would clearly have been negligence.

The Merchant Marine Council of the U.S. Coast Guard made note of the precedent in this finding that “there is no legal requirement that radar be used as an anti-collision device when the visibility does not seem to be impaired.”

=== Impleading ===
The case before Bryan was a petition of the United States for exoneration from or limitation of liability. The case included claims made by passengers on the Duke of York against both the U.S. and the Duke of York's owners, the British Transport Commission. Bryan dismissed the petitions of other claimants against the Commission: “To permit one claimant to prosecute another claimant in the limitation litigation would be unfair. The [Commission] has intervened under compulsion, the court enjoining his resort to any other tribunal”.

This decision to exclude other claims favored the Commission, but the Commission appealed the district court decision, hoping to fix some liability on the Haiti Victory. The appeal backfired. The appellate court upheld the exoneration of the Haiti Victory but overturned the decision against the claimants, leaving the Commission liable for all damages resulting from the collision (February 13, 1956). The Appeals Court admitted that there were no cases that directly addressed the question, which "is close and not free from difficulty." However, “The merits of the case have been adjudicated and it would work an undue hardship on all of the claimants herein not to have their rights against the British Transport Commission settled at this time.”

The Commission took their case to the U.S. Supreme Court, which upheld the findings of the appellate court (June 10, 1957).

The legal battle was finally closed in December 1959. The Commission paid all claims; the largest one was to the United States for damages to the Haiti Victory.

== Aftermath ==
Both ships were repaired and remained in service until the mid-seventies.
