= Smyley Island =

Island of Antarctica

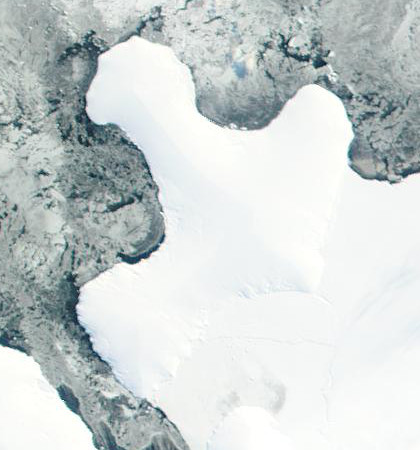
- Satellite image of Smyley Island

- Location in Antarctica

Geography
- Location: Palmer Land, Antarctica
- Coordinates: 72°55′S 78°0′W
- Length: 61 km (37.9 mi)
- Width: 34 km (21.1 mi)

Administration
- Administered under the Antarctic Treaty System

Demographics
- Population: Uninhabited

Smyley Island is an Antarctic island lying off the Antarctic Peninsula. The island is 61 km (38 mi) long and from 13 to 34 km (8 to 21 mi) wide, and lies about 20 km (12 mi) north of Case Island. It connects to the Stange Ice Shelf and is separated from Alexander Island by the Ronne Entrance. Smyley Island is one of the 27 islands of Palmer Land, Antarctica.

== Discovery and naming ==
In 1939–1941 Smyley Island was first identified as a peninsula of mainland Antarctica by the United States Antarctic Service and was named Cape Smyley. In 1968 it was identified as an island on a U.S. Geological Survey map. The island is named after Captain William H. Smyley, the American master of the sealing vessel Ohio during 1841–42.

== Important Bird Area ==
A 497 ha site on fast ice near Scorseby Head, on the northern shore of the island, has been designated an Important Bird Area (IBA) by BirdLife International because it supports a breeding colony of some 6,000 emperor penguins, based on 2009 satellite imagery.

== See also ==
- Composite Antarctic Gazetteer
- List of Antarctic and Subantarctic islands
- List of Antarctic islands south of 60° S
- Scientific Committee on Antarctic Research
- Territorial claims in Antarctica
