= King Peninsula =

Ice-covered peninsula forming the south side of Peacock Sound, Antarctica

- Location within Antarctica

Geography
- Location: Ellsworth Land, Antarctica
- Coordinates: 73°12′S 101°00′W

King Peninsula (73°12′S 101°00′W) is an ice-covered peninsula, 100 nautical miles (190 km; 120 mi) long and 20 nautical miles (37 km; 23 mi) wide, lying south of Thurston Island and forming the south side of Peacock Sound, Antarctica. It projects from the continental ice sheet and trends west between the Abbot Ice Shelf and Cosgrove Ice Shelf to terminate at the Amundsen Sea.

== Location ==
Thurston Island in north of map

The north shore of the King Peninsula is the western end of the Eights Coast, while the west and southern shore is in the Walgreen Coast. Peacock Sound is to the north, completely filled by the western part of the Abbot Ice Shelf. The Amundsen Sea is to the west. Ferrerro Bay and the Cosgrove Ice Shelf are to the south. Burke Island is in the sea to the west. The Waite Islands are off Cape Waite, the northwest extremity of the peninsula. Marelli Glacier drains northeast from the peninsula into the Abbot Ice Shelf.

== Mapping and name ==
The King Peninsula was photographed from the air by United States Navy Operation Highjump, 1946–47. It was plotted from these photos as a long island, or possible peninsula. Photos taken by the United States Navy in 1966 show it is a peninsula. King Peninsula was named by the United States Advisory Committee on Antarctic Names (US-ACAN) for Fleet Admiral Ernest J. King, United States Navy, Chief of Naval Operations from 1942 to 1945, who approved the preliminary work for Operation Highjump (OpHjp).

== Glaciers ==
Glaciers flowing into Peacock Sound are, from northwest to southeast,

=== Stapleton Glacier ===
72.9333333°S 102.5°W Glacier about 6 nautical miles (11 km; 6.9 mi) long flowing east from King Peninsula just north of Morelli Glacier. Named by US-ACAN after Jo Anne Stapleton, United States Geological Survey (USGS), Reston, Virginia, geographer and map specialist, participated in Antarctic map production from the 1980s to the present, part of the United States Geological Survey (USGS) team that compiled the 1:5,000,000-scale Advanced Very High Resolution Radiometer maps of Antarctica and the 1: 250,000-scale Landsat TM image maps of the Siple Coast area.

=== Morelli Glacier ===
72°59′S 102°33′W. A glacier in the west part of King Peninsula, 18 nautical miles (33 km; 21 mi) southeast of Cape Waite, draining northeast to Abbot Ice Shelf in Peacock Sound. Mapped by USGS from surveys and United States Navy air photos, 1960-66. Named by US-ACAN for Panfilo S. Morelli, glaciologist at Byrd Station, 1961-62.

=== Rignot Glacier ===
73.1°S 102°W Glacier about 4 nautical miles (7.4 km; 4.6 mi) long draining north from the King Peninsula into Abbot Ice Shelf. Named by US-ACAN after Eric J. Rignot, Jet Propulsion Laboratory, California Institute of Technology, geophysicist; uses field and remotely sensed data to study Antarctic glacier mechanics from the 1990s to the present.

=== Rosanova Glacier ===
73.25°S 97.9166667°W Glacier about 8 nautical miles (15 km; 9.2 mi) long flowing north from King Peninsula into the Abbot Ice Shelf. Named by US-ACAN after Christine E. Rosanova, United States Geological Survey (USGS), Flagstaff, AZ; specialist in the use of satellite imagery for geological and glaciological studies from the early 1990s to 2002; a pioneer in the use of imagery for glacier velocity measurements.

== Features ==
Features surrounding the peninsula include, clockwise from the south,

=== Cosgrove Ice Shelf ===
73°32′S 100°45′W. An ice shelf 35 nautical miles (65 km; 40 mi) long and 25 nautical miles (46 km; 29 mi) wide, occupying the inner (east) part of the embayment between King Peninsula and Canisteo Peninsula. Mapped from air photos taken by United States Navy OpHjp, 1946-47. Named by US-ACAN for Lieutenant Jerome R. Cosgrove, United States Navy Reserve, assistant communications officer on the staff of the Commander, United States Navy Support Force, Antarctica, during United States Navy OpDFrz, 1967 and 1968.

=== Ferrero Bay ===
73°28′S 102°30′W. A body of water about 15 nautical miles (28 km; 17 mi) wide, lying immediately west of Cosgrove Ice Shelf and occupying the outer (west) part of the embayment between King and Canisteo Peninsulas. Mapped from air photos taken by United States Navy OpHjp in December 1946. Named by US-ACAN for Lieutenant Commander H.H. Ferrero, communications officer on the staff of the Commander, United States Navy Support Force, Antarctica, 1966-68.

=== Early Islands ===
73°40′S 101°40′W. Group of small islands lying just west of Cosgrove Ice Shelf in the southeast corner of Ferrero Bay, Amundsen Sea. Mapped by USGS from ground surveys and United States Navy air photos, 1960-66. Named by US-ACAN for Tommy Joe Early, biologist with the Ellsworth Land Survey, 1968-69.

=== Burke Island ===
73°08′S 105°06′W. An ice-covered island about 16 nautical miles (30 km; 18 mi) long and 6 nautical miles (11 km; 6.9 mi) wide, lying 37 nautical miles (69 km; 43 mi) southwest of Cape Waite, King Peninsula. Delineated from aerial photographs taken by United States Navy Squadron VX-6 in January 1960. Named by US-ACAN for Admiral Arleigh A. Burke, United States Navy, Chief of Naval Operations during United States Navy Deep Freeze operations of 1956-61.

=== Waite Islands ===
72°44′S 103°40′W. A group of small islands in Amundsen Sea, lying 6 nautical miles (11 km; 6.9 mi) west of Cape Waite, the northwest extremity of King Peninsula. Mapped by USGS from surveys and United States Navy air photos, 1960-66. Named by US-ACAN for their proximity to Cape Waite.

=== Cape Waite ===
72°44′S 103°16′W. Cape at the northwest extremity of King Peninsula, marking the southwest side of the entrance to Peacock Sound. Delineated from air photos taken by United States Navy OpHjp in December 1946. Named by US-ACAN for Amory H. Waite, member of the Byrd Antarctic Expedition, 1933-35, and communications specialist on the Atka vovage of 1955 and the United States Navy Bellingshausen Sea Expedition of 1959-60.

== Sources ==
- Alberts, Fred G., ed. (1995), Geographic Names of the Antarctic (PDF) (2 ed.), United States Board on Geographic Names This article incorporates public domain material from websites or documents of the United States Board on Geographic Names.
- "Rignot Glacier", Geographic Names Information System, United States Geological Survey, United States Department of the Interior
- "Rosanova Glacier", Geographic Names Information System, United States Geological Survey, United States Department of the Interior
- "Stapleton Glacier", Geographic Names Information System, United States Geological Survey, United States Department of the Interior
- Thurston Island to Jones Mountains (PDF), USGS: United States Geological Survey
- This article incorporates public domain material from websites or documents of the United States Geological Survey.
