= James Lloyd Abbot Jr. =

American naval admiral (1918–2012)

James Lloyd Abbot, IV
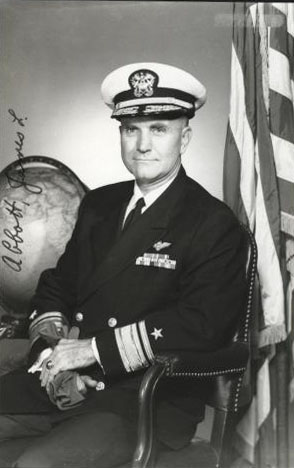
- Born: June 28, 1918; Mobile, Alabama, US
- Died: August 10, 2012 (aged 94); Alexandria, Virginia, US
- Burial place: United States Naval Academy Cemetery
- Education: United States Naval Academy (1939); National War College
- Relatives: CAPT James Lloyd Abbot, III (Father); ADM Charles S. Abbot (Son); CAPT J. Lloyd Abbot V (Son)
- Military career
- Allegiance: United States
- Branch: United States Navy
- Service years: 1939–1974
- Rank: Rear admiral
- Nickname: "Doc"
- Commands: Scouting Squadron 66; Fighter Squadron 42; Utility Squadron 4 USS Valcour (AVP-55); USS Intrepid (CV-11); US Naval Support Force (Antarctica); Carrier Division 16
- Conflicts: World War II
- Awards: Legion of Merit (2); Air Medal; Navy Commendation Medal

James Lloyd "Doc" Abbot, IV (June 26, 1918 – August 10, 2012) was an American U.S. Navy admiral from Mobile, Alabama. He graduated from the U.S. Naval Academy in 1939. Abbot was the commanding officer of the attack aircraft carrier USS Intrepid, which dispatched a helicopter to pick up astronaut Scott Carpenter. He was promoted to rear admiral on May 30, 1967.

Abbot also operated near Antarctica, assuming command of the U.S. Naval Support Force, Antarctica, in February 1967. The Abbot Ice Shelf is named after him. His awards include two Legion of Merit awards and the Navy Commendation Medal.

Abbot was still flying his own airplane past the age of 90 with the Federal Aviation Administration telling Abbot that he couldn't fly alone. He has two sons, retired U.S. Navy Captain J. Lloyd Abbot, III and retired U.S. Navy Admiral Charles S. Abbot; both are former Navy aviators.

Abbot graduated from flight school in Miami, Florida, on November 25, 1941.
