= Bellinghausen =

Bellinghausen may refer to:

== People with the surname ==
- Axel Bellinghausen (born 1983), German footballer
- Eligius Franz Joseph, Freiherr von Munch-Bellinghausen (1806–1871), Austrian dramatist

== Geography ==
- Motu One (Society Islands)

== See also ==
- Bellingshausen (disambiguation)
