= Carroll Inlet =

Body of water in Ellsworth Land, Antarctica

- Location within Antarctica
- Location: Ellsworth Land, Antarctica
- Coordinates: 73°18′S 78°30′W
- Type: Inlet
- Ocean/sea sources: Bellingshausen Sea

Carroll Inlet (73°18′S 78°30′W) is an inlet, 40 nautical miles (74 km; 46 mi) long and 6 nautical miles (11 km; 6.9 mi) wide, trending southeast along the coast of Ellsworth Land, Antarctica, between the Rydberg Peninsula and Smyley Island. The head of the inlet is divided into two arms by the presence of Case Island and is bounded to the east by Stange Ice Shelf.

== Location ==
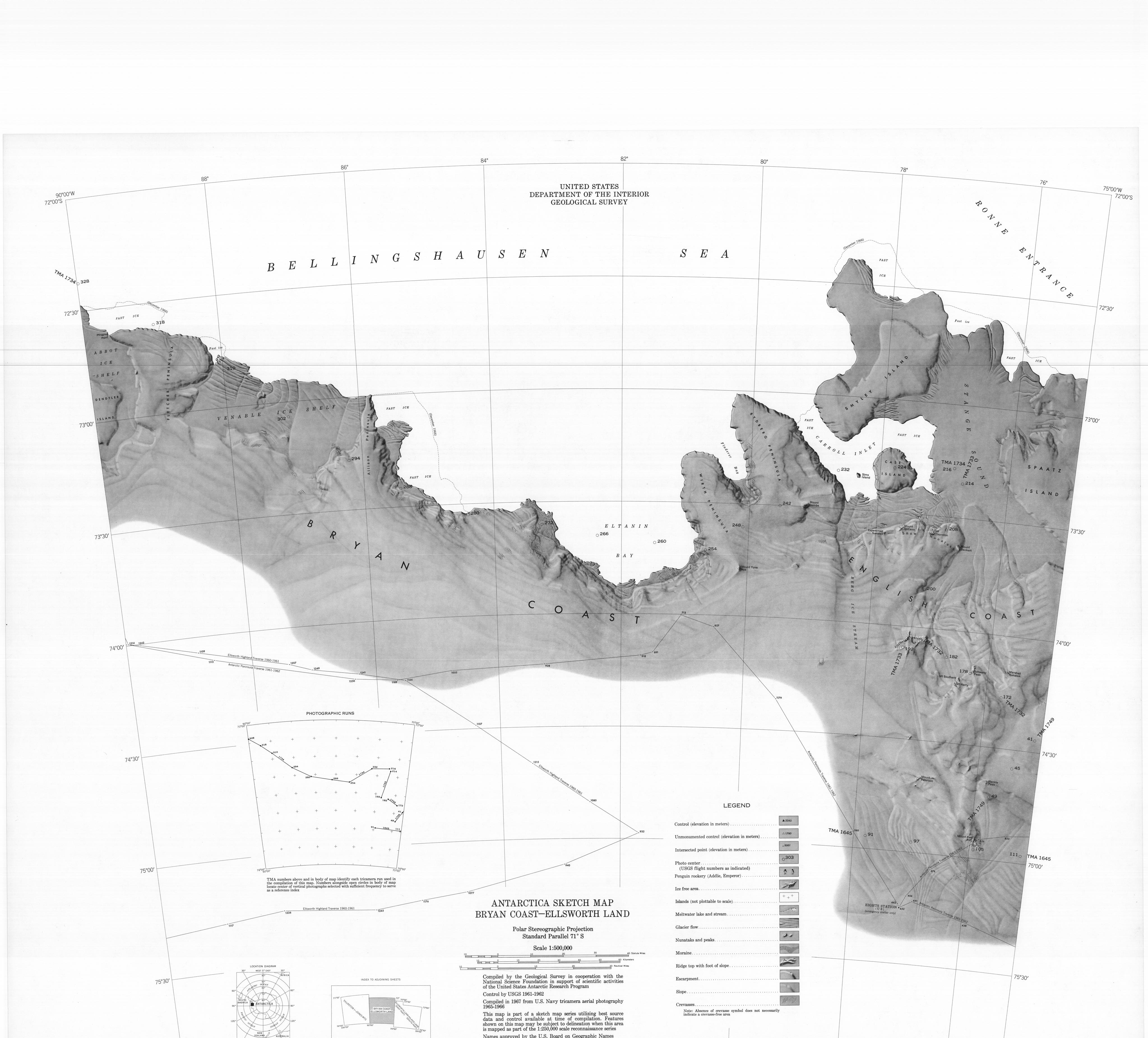
Carroll Inlet in northeast of map

Carroll Inlet is on the English Coast of eastern Ellsworth Land, opening onto the Bellingshausen Sea. It is east of the Rydberg Peninsula. To the west it joins the ice-covered Stange Sound, which is fed by Hill Glacier. Islands include Smyley Island to the north, between Carroll Inlet and Stange Sound, Sims Island and Case Island in the inlet, and Spatz Island to the east of Stange Sound. The Berg Ice Stream flows north past FitzGerald Bluffs to enter the ice sheet in the south of the inlet. The Snow Nunataks overlook the south of the inlet. They include Espenschied Nunatak, Mount McCann, Mount Thornton and Mount Benkert.

== Discovery and name ==
Carroll Inlet was discovered on an airplane flight, 22 December 1940, by members of the United States Antarctic Service (USAS) (1939–1941). It was named after Arthur J. Carroll, chief aerial photographer on USAS flights from the East Base.

== Features ==
=== Berg Ice Stream ===
73°42′S 78°20′W. An ice stream about 30 nautical miles (56 km; 35 mi) long flowing into Carroll Inlet between Rydberg Peninsula and Espenschied Nunatak. Mapped by USGS from surveys and United States Navy air photos, 1961-66. Named by US-ACAN after Captain Harold Berg, commander of United States NavyS Eltanin on Antarctic cruises, 1964-65.

=== Smyley Island ===
72°55′S 78°00′W. An ice-covered island, 38 nautical miles (70 km; 44 mi) long and from 8 to 21 nautical miles (15 to 39 km; 9.2 to 24.2 mi) wide, lying at the south side of Ronne Entrance and just northeast of Rydberg Peninsula. The feature is almost wholly surrounded by an ice shelf, which gives an erroneous impression that the island is joined to Ellsworth Land. This larger composite feature was observed from aircraft by members of the USAS, 1939-41, who gave the name "Cape Smyley" to the projecting ice shelf at the northwest extremity. The United States Advisory Committee on Antarctic Names (US-ACAN) has withdrawn that name on the basis of the 1968 United States Geological Survey (USGS) map of the area and has approved the name Smyley Island for the island described. Named after Captain William H. Smyley, American master of the sealing vessel Ohio during 1841-42. Captain Smyley, in February 1842, recovered the self-recording thermometer left at Pendulum Cove, Deception Island, by Captain Henry Foster of the Chanticleer, in 1829. The minimum reading was reported to be 0.5|F.

=== Sims Island ===
73°21′S 78°19′W. A small but conspicuous island between Rydberg Peninsula and Case Island in the southern part of Carroll Inlet. Discovered by pilot Ashley Snow of USAS (1939–41) on an aircraft flight, 22 December 1940. Named for Lieutenant (j.g.) L.S. Sims, USMC, surgeon on the expedition.

=== Case Island ===
73°19′S 77°48′W. A roughly circular ice-covered island, 12 nautical miles (22 km; 14 mi) in diameter, lying off the coast of Ellsworth Land. The island lies in Carroll Inlet between the mainland and Smyley Island. Mapped by USGS from surveys and United States Navy aerial photographs, 1961-66. The name was suggested by Finn Ronne for Senator Francis H. Case (1896-1962), who assisted in obtaining Government support to provide a ship for the Ronne Antarctic Research Expedition, 1947–48.

== Snow Nunataks ==
73°35′S 77°15′W. A line of four widely separated nunataks on the coast of Ellsworth Land. The peaks lie southward of Case Island and trend east-west for 20 miles. The nunataks were discovered by the USAS (1939-41) and named for Ashley C. Snow, aviation pilot on the expedition.

=== Espenschied Nunatak ===
73°35′S 77°52′W. The westernmost member of the Snow Nunataks. This nunatak was mapped by USGS from surveys and United States Navy air photos, 1961-66. Named by US-AC AN after Peter C. Espenschied, USARP auroral scientist at the Byrd Auroral Sub-Station, 1960-61.

=== Mount McCann ===
73°34′S 77°37′W. A mountain between Espenschied Nunatak and Mount Thornton in the west-central part of the Snow Nunataks. Discovered and photographed by the USAS, 1939-41. Named by US-ACAN for Captain Kenneth McCann, commander of United States NavyS Eltanin on Antarctic cruises from September 1965 to September 1966.

=== Mount Thornton ===
73°34′S 77°07′W. A mountain between Mount McCann and Mount Benkert in the east-central part of the Snow Nunataks, Ellsworth Land. Discovered and photographed by the USAS 1939-41. Named by US-ACAN for Captain Richard Thornton, commander of United States NavyS Eltanin on Antarctic cruises, 1967-68.

=== Mount Benkert. ===
73°38′S 76°40′W. The easternmost member of the Snow Nunataks, standing 8 nautical miles (15 km; 9.2 mi) east-southeast of Mount Thornton. Discovered and photographed by the USAS, 1939-41. Named by US-ACAN for Captain W.M. Benkert, USCG, commander of the Eastwind in Antarctica during Operation Deep Freeze 1966 and 1967.

== Sources ==
- Alberts, Fred G., ed. (1995), Geographic Names of the Antarctic (PDF) (2 ed.), United States Board on Geographic Names This article incorporates public domain material from websites or documents of the United States Board on Geographic Names.
- Bryan Coast to Ellsworth Land, USGS: United States Geological Survey

This article incorporates public domain material from websites or documents of the United States Geological Survey.
