= Snow Nunataks =

Nunatak group in Palmer Land, Antarctica

Coordinates: 73°35′S 77°15′W

The Snow Nunataks (or Ashley Snow Nunataks) are a line of four widely separated nunataks on the coast of Palmer Land, Antarctica, trending east–west for 20 mi (32 km) southward of Case Island. They consist of volcanic outcrops that probably represent several small subglacial volcanoes. Most of the nunataks are mounds of pillow lava overlain by lapilli tuffs. However, two of them may be tuyas due to the existence of subaerially-chilled caprocks. The Snow Nunataks are uncertain in age but they probably formed in the Late Miocene or later.

The nunataks were discovered by the United States Antarctic Service (USAS) (1939–41) and named for Ashley C. Snow, aviation pilot on the expedition.
