= Abbot Ice Shelf =

Ice shelf in Antarctica

Abbot Ice Shelf'
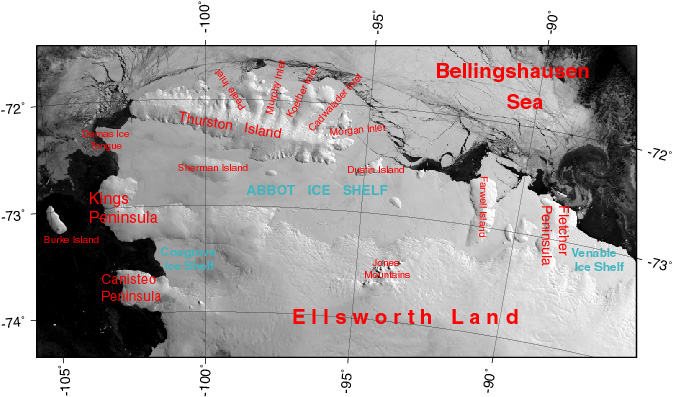
- Abbot Ice Shelf, MODIS image from 10 March 2003, 14:50

- Location within Antarctica
- Coordinates: 72°45′S 96°00′W

The Abbot Ice Shelf (72°45′S 96°00′W) is an ice shelf 250 nautical miles (460 km; 290 mi) long and 40 nautical miles (74 km; 46 mi) wide, bordering Eights Coast from Cape Waite to Pfrogner Point in Antarctica. Thurston Island lies along the northern edge of the western half of this ice shelf; other sizable islands (Sherman Island, Carpenter Island, Dustin Island, Johnson Island, McNamara Island, Farwell Island and Dendtler Island) lie partly or wholly within this shelf.

== Location ==
Thurston Island in north of map. Abbott Ice Shelf extends across the map to the south of the island

The Abbott Ice Shelf extends to the south of Thurston Island, Dustin Island, McNamara Island, and Farwell Island all of which lie between the ice shelf and the Bellingshausen Sea. It occupies the whole of Peacock Sound in its western part. The Demas Ice Tongue extends into the Amundsen Sea from the west end of the ice shelf. Islands embedded in the Abbott Ice Shelf include the Trice Islands, Sherman Island, Carpenter Island, Johnson Island, Lepley Nunatak and Dendtler Island. It is to the north of King Peninsula and Jones Mountains on the Eights Coast, Cape Waite on King Peninsula lies at its western end, and Pfrogner Point on Fletcher Peninsula is at its eastern end. Fletcher Peninsula separates it from the Venable Ice Shelf to the east.

== Discovery and name ==
The Abbot Ice Shelf shelf was sighted by members of the United States Antarctic Service in flights from the ship Bear, in February 1940. Its western portion was delineated from air photos taken by the United States Navy (USN) Operation Highjump, 1946–47. The full extent was mapped by the United States Geological Survey (USGS) from USN air photos of 1966. It was named by the United States Advisory Committee on Antarctic Names (US-ACAN) for Rear Admiral James Lloyd Abbot Jr., Commanding Officer, U.S. Naval Support Force, Antarctica, February 1967 to June 1969.

== Features ==
=== Peacock Sound ===
72°45′S 99°00′W. An ice-filled sound, 135 nautical miles (250 km; 155 mi) long and 40 nautical miles (74 km; 46 mi) wide, separating Thurston Island from the Eights Coast. The sound is not navigable by ships, it being occupied by the western part of Abbot Ice Shelf. The feature was discovered by members of the USAS in flights from the ship Bear in February 1940, and was further delineated from air photos taken by United States Navy Operation Highjump in December 1946. The sound was first noted to parallel the entire south coast of Thurston Island, thereby establishing insularity, by the United States Navy Bellingshausen Sea Expedition in February 1960. Named after the sloop of war Peacock in which Captain William L. Hudson, in company with the tender Flying Fish under Lieutenant William M. Walker, both of the USEE, 1838-42, sailed along the edge of the pack ice to the north of Thurston Island for several days in March 1839.

=== Farwell Island ===
72°49′S 91°10′W. An ice-covered island, about 38 nautical miles (70 km; 44 mi) long and 10 nautical miles (19 km; 12 mi) wide, lying between McNamara and Dendtler Islands in the east part of Abbot Ice Shelf. The feature was positioned by parties from the USS Glacier and Stolen Island in February 1961, and was mapped by USGS from United States Navy air photos of 1966. Named by US-ACAN for Captain A.F. Farwell, Chief of Staff to the Commander, United States Naval Support Force, Antarctica, during Deep Freeze 1968 and 1969.

=== Sherman Island ===
72°38′S 100°00′W. An ice-covered island about 32 nautical miles (59 km; 37 mi) long and 10 nautical miles (19 km; 12 mi) wide, lying south of Thurston Island in the middle of Peacock Sound. The feature rises above Abbot Ice Shelf which occupies the sound. Delineated from aerial photographs taken by United States Navy OpHjp in December 1946. Named by US-ACAN for Admiral Forrest Sherman, United States Navy, Chief of Naval Operations, 1949-51, when preparations were being made for United States Naval support during the forthcoming IGY operations.

=== Trice Islands ===
72°25′S 99°48′W. A group of small ice-covered islands lying just west of Evans Point. The group rises above the general level of Abbot Ice Shelf which occupies the sound. First mapped from air photos taken by United States Navy OpHjp, .1946-47. Named by US-ACAN for Jack L. Trice, meteorologist at Byrd Station, 1964–65.

=== Carpenter Island ===
72°39′S 98°03′W. An oval-shaped island, 7 nautical miles (13 km; 8.1 mi) long, within the Abbot Ice Shelf of Peacock Sound. It lies 17 nautical miles (31 km; 20 mi) due east of Sherman Island. Mapped by USGS from surveys and United States Navy air photos, 1960–66. Named by US-ACAN for Donald L. Carpenter, radio scientist at Byrd Station, 1966-67.

=== Johnson Island ===
72°51′S 93°55′W. An ice-covered island, about 9 nautical miles (17 km; 10 mi) long and 5 nautical miles (9.3 km; 5.8 mi) wide, lying within Abbot Ice Shelf, about 14 nautical miles (26 km; 16 mi) southeast of Dustin Island. The feature was observed and roughly positioned as an "ice rise" by parties from the USS Glacier in February 1961. Remapped by USGS from United States Navy air photos, 1966. Named by US-ACAN for Theodore L. Johnson, electrical engineer at Byrd Station, 1964–65.

=== Lepley Nunatak ===
73°07′S 90°23′W. A small conspicuous rocky nunatak 2 nautical miles (3.7 km; 2.3 mi) southwest of Dentler Island, lying near the inner part and east end of Abbot Ice Shelf. First sighted on February 9, 1961 from helicopters of the USS Glacier and Staten Island. Named by US-ACAN for Larry K. Lepley, oceanographer of the United States Navy Hydrographic Office, who with three others was marooned at this nunatak, February 12-15, 1961, by a severe wind and snowstorm.

=== Dendtler Island ===
72°58′S 89°57′W. An ice-covered island, 14 nautical miles (26 km; 16 mi) long, lying in the east part of Abbot Ice Shelf between Farwell Island and Fletcher Peninsula. Mapped by USGS from surveys and United States Navy air photos, 1960–66. Named by US-ACAN for Major Robert Dendtler, United States Army, coordinating officer on the staff of the Commander, United States Navy Support Force, Antarctica, during Deep Freeze 1967 and 1968.

=== Demas Ice Tongue ===
72°22′S 103°20′W. Conspicuous ice tongue, about 20 nautical miles (37 km; 23 mi) long, extending west from Abbot Ice Shelf of Peacock Sound into the Amundsen Sea. Discovered by members of the USAS in flights from the Bear, February 1940, and named after E.J. Demas (d. 1979), member of the ByrdAE of 1928-30 and 1933-35.

== Sources ==
- Alberts, Fred G., ed. (1995), Geographic Names of the Antarctic (PDF) (2 ed.), United States Board on Geographic Names This article incorporates public domain material from websites or documents of the United States Board on Geographic Names.
- Thurston Island to Jones Mountains (PDF), USGS: United States Geological Survey
- This article incorporates public domain material from websites or documents of the United States Geological Survey.
