= Bellingshausen Plain =

Undersea plain of the Bellingshausen Sea

- Approximate location

Bellingshausen Plain (64°0′S 90°0′W), also known as Bellinghausen Abyssal Plain, is an undersea plain parallel to the continental rise in the Bellingshausen Sea, named for Admiral Fabian Gottlieb von Bellingshausen, commander of the Russian Antarctic Expedition (1818–1821). The name was approved by the Advisory Committee for Undersea Features in April 1974.
