= Lindenberg Island =

Island in Graham Land, Antarctica

- Location within Antarctica Location within Antarctic Peninsula

Geography
- Location: Antarctica
- Coordinates: 64°55′S 59°40′W

Administration
- Administered under the Antarctic Treaty System

Demographics
- Population: Uninhabited

Lindenberg Island is a circular volcanic island 1 kilometre (0.5 nmi) in diameter, lying 20 kilometres (11 nmi) north of Robertson Island and some 60 kilometres (35 nmi) east-northeast of Cape Fairweather, off the east coast of the Antarctic Peninsula. It was discovered by a Norwegian whaling expedition under C.A. Larsen in December 1893, and was named by Larsen for a member of the firm of Woltereck and Robertson of Hamburg which sent him to the Antarctic.

== See also ==
- List of Antarctic and sub-Antarctic islands
