= Dustin Island =

Island in Ellsworth Land, Antarctica

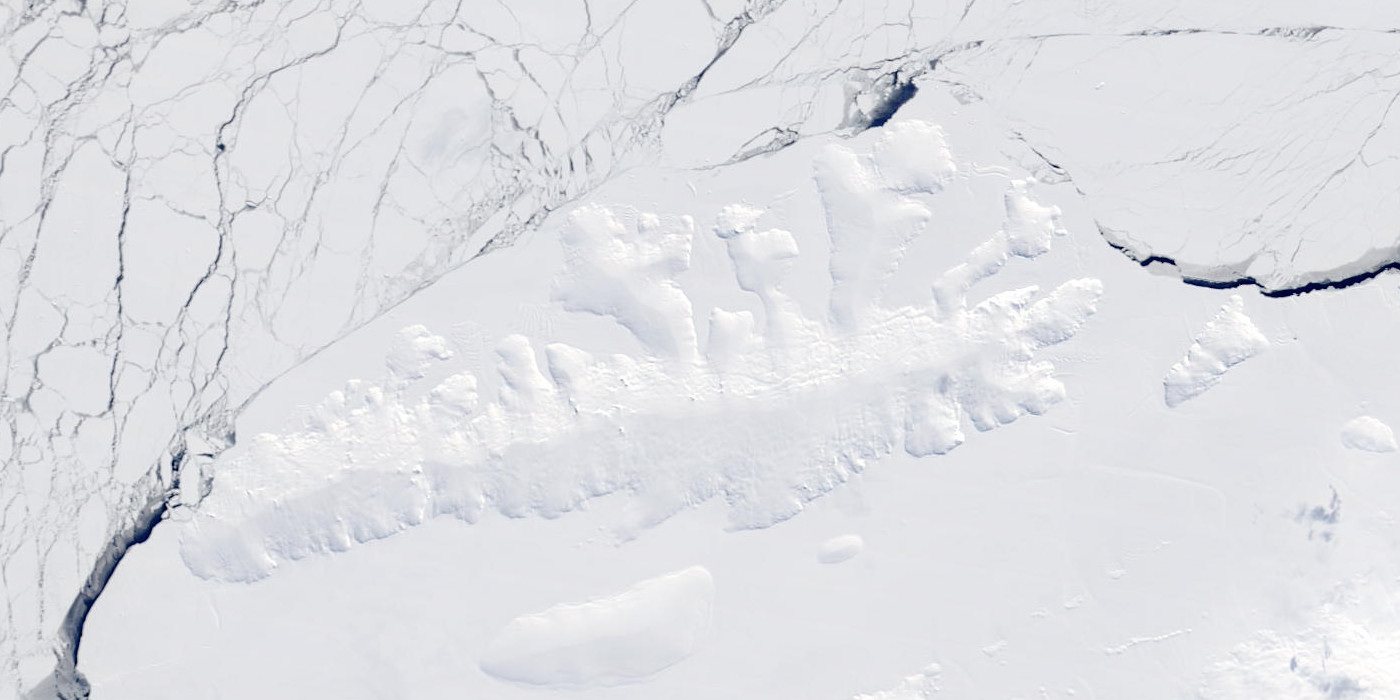
- Satellite image of Thurston Island.

- Location within Antarctica

Geography
- Location: Ellsworth Land, Antarctica
- Coordinates: 72°34′S 94°50′W
- Length: 33 km (20.5 mi)

Administration
- Administered under the Antarctic Treaty System

Demographics
- Population: Uninhabited

Dustin Island (72°34′S 94°50′W) is an island about 18 nautical miles (33 km; 21 mi) long, lying 15 nautical miles (28 km; 17 mi) southeast of Cape Annawan, Thurston Island, Antarctica. The island forms the southeast limit of Seraph Bay.

== Location ==
Dustin Island in northeast of map, off the east end of Thurston Island

Thurston Island is separated from the mainland by Peacock Sound, which is occupied by the western portion of the Abbot Ice Shelf. Dustin Island is off the southeast corner of Thurston Island, from which it is separated by Seraph Bay to the north. The Abbot Ice Shelf reaches to the south of the island. Features include Ehlers Knob, Smith Bluffs and Standifer Bluff. MacNamara Island lies to the east. Features include Peeler Bluff and Langhofer Island.

== Discovery and name ==
Dustin Island was discovered by Rear Admiral Richard E. Byrd and other members of the United States Antarctic Service (USAS) in a flight from the Bear on February 27, 1940. It was named by Byrd for Frederick G. Dustin, member of the Byrd AE and mechanic with the USAS, 1939–41.

== Features ==
Features and nearby features include, from west to east:

=== Seraph Bay ===
72°28′S 95°12′W. An open bay about 15 nautical miles (28 km; 17 mi) wide, formed at the southeast end of Thurston Island. It is bounded by Cape Annawan on the northwest, Abbot Ice Shelf on the southwest and Dustin Island on the southeast Discovered by members of the USAS in flights from the ship Bear in February 1940. The bay was more accurately delineated by the United States Navy Bellingshausen Sea Expedition in February 1960. Named by US-SCAN for the brig Seraph of Stonington, CT, which in 1830, under Captain Benjamin Pendleton, sailed westward from the South Shetland Islands, reaching as far as 101|W, south of 60|S.

=== Ehlers Knob ===
72°34′S 95°04′W. A small but conspicuous ice-covered knob that surmounts the west part of the north coast of Dustin Island. The knob was photographed from the helicopters of Burton Island and Glacier on the United States Navy Bellingshausen Sea Expedition in February 1960. It was visited and surveyed by a party from the Glacier in February 1961. Named by US-ACAN for Robert C. Ehlers, field assistant at Byrd Station, 1966–67.

=== Smith Bluffs ===
72°32′S 94°56′W. A line of ice-covered bluffs with many rock exposures, marking the north side of Dustin Island and the south limit of Seraph Bay. Discovered in helicopter flights from the USS Burton Island and Glacier of the United States Navy Bellingshausen Sea Expedition, February 1960, and named for Philip M. Smith of the National Science Foundation, USARP Representative on this expedition.

=== Standifer Bluff ===
72°32′S 95°00′W. Conspicuous rock bluff, a component of the Smith Bluffs which form the northwest coast of Dustin Island, standing 10 nautical miles (19 km; 12 mi) west-southwest of the north tip of the island. The bluff was photographed from the helicopters of the USS Burton Island and Glacier in the United States Navy Bellingshausen Sea Expedition, February 1960. Named by US-ACAN for J.N. Standifer, USGS photographic specialist in Antarctica in the 1967–68 season.

=== McNamara Island ===
72°34′S 93°12′W. A mainly ice-covered island, 6 nautical miles (11 km; 6.9 mi) long, which is partly within the north edge of Abbot Ice Shelf, about 20 nautical miles (37 km; 23 mi) east of Dustin Island. Discovered by R. Admiral Byrd and members of the USAS on flights from the Bear, February 27, 1940. Named by Byrd for John McNamara, boatswain on the Jacob Ruppert of the ByrdAE, 1933–35.

=== Hatch Outcrop ===
72°34′S 93°20′W. An outcropping of rocks close northward of Peeler Bluff in the western part of McNamara Island. The island lies within the northern part of the Abbot Ice Shelf. Named by US-ACAN for Lieutenant Ross Hatch, United States Navy, who assisted in obtaining position data at this outcrop, February 7, 1961.

=== Peeler Bluff ===
72°35′S 93°20′W. A prominent rock bluff along the middle of the west coast of McNamara Island. The island lies within the northern edge of the Abbot Ice Shelf, but Peeler Bluff is a conspicuous navigation mark from seaward. This area was explored by personnel aboard the USS Glacier and Staten Island in February 1961. Named by US-ACAN for Lieutenant Commander James C. Peeler, United States Navy, who camped here, February 7–9, 1961, and obtained position data for the bluff and other points in the vicinity.

=== Langhofer Island ===
72°32′S 93°02′W. A small ice-covered island with a rock outcrop near the south end, lying at the north edge of Abbot Ice Shelf and 0.5 nautical miles (0.93 km; 0.58 mi) east of McNamara Island. The USS Glacier lay close off the island, February 11, 1961, and geological and botanical collections were made at the outcrop. Named by US-ACAN for Joel H. Langhofer, USGS topographic engineer aboard the Glacier, who positioned geographical features in this area.

== Sources ==
- Alberts, Fred G., ed. (1995), Geographic Names of the Antarctic (PDF) (2 ed.), United States Board on Geographic Names This article incorporates public domain material from websites or documents of the United States Board on Geographic Names.
- Thurston Island (PDF), USGS: United States Geological Survey
- This article incorporates public domain material from websites or documents of the United States Geological Survey.
