= Zélée Subglacial Trench =

Subglacial valley on George V Coast off Antarctica

The Zélée Subglacial Trench (68°0′S 144°0′E) is a subglacial valley on George V Coast, running north-northeast to south-southwest and coinciding with the trough cut by the Mertz Glacier. The feature was delineated by the Scott Polar Research Institute (SPRI)-NSF-TUD airborne radio echo sounding program, 1967–79, and named after the corvette Zélée (Lt. Charles Jacquinot) of the French expedition of 1837–40 under Capt. Jules Dumont d'Urville.
