= Eights Coast =

Portion of the coast of West Antarctica

Coordinates: 73°30′S 96°0′W

Eights Coast is a portion of the coast of West Antarctica, between Cape Waite and Pfrogner Point. To the west is the Walgreen Coast, and to the east is the Bryan Coast. It is part of Ellsworth Land and stretches between 103°24'W and 89°35'W. This coast is bordered by Thurston Island, Abbot Ice Shelf and some islands within the ice shelf, and for most of its length touches the Bellingshausen Sea (west of Thurston Island by the Amundsen Sea). Most of Eights Coast is not claimed by any nation. In the east, Eights Coast borders the sector claimed by Chile as part of its southernmost province. Peter I Island, 450 kilometers (280 miles) north of the coast, is claimed by Norway as a dependency.

The coast was sighted by members of the US Antarctic Service by flights from the USS Bear during February 1940. It was mapped in detail by the United States Geological Survey from surveys and from U.S. Navy air photographs, 1960–1966. Eights Coast was named by the Advisory Committee on Antarctic Names for James Eights of Albany, New York, a geologist on the ship Annawan during 1830, who performed geological investigations of the South Shetland Islands, and who cruised westward on the Annawan, in company with the ship Penguin, to 103°W. Eights, the earliest American scientist in the Antarctic, discovered the first known fossils in the Antarctic region, a tree section in the South Shetland Islands. As a result of these investigations Eights, during 1833, published in the Transactions of the Albany Institute (Vol. 2) what proved to be remarkably accurate observations and conclusions concerning the natural phenomena of the region.
