= Charles S. Abbot =

United States Navy Admiral

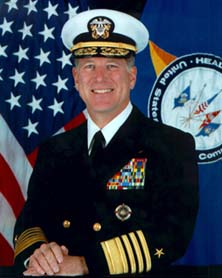
- Admiral Charles S. Abbot
- Born: January 19, 1945 (age 81); Pensacola, Florida, U.S.
- Military career
- Allegiance: United States of America
- Branch: United States Navy
- Service years: 1966-2000
- Rank: Admiral
- Commands: United States Sixth Fleet; Carrier Strike Group Eight; USS Theodore Roosevelt (CVN-71)
- Conflicts: Vietnam War; Gulf War
- Awards: Defense Distinguished Service Medal(2); Legion of Merit(4); Bronze Star
- Other work: Deputy Homeland Security Advisor; President, Navy-Marine Corps Relief Society

Charles Stevenson "Steve" Abbot (born January 19, 1945) is a retired United States Navy Admiral who served as Deputy Commander in Chief, United States European Command (DCINCEUR) from 1998 to 2000.

== Military career ==
Abbot was born on January 19, 1945, in Pensacola, Florida. He graduated from Phillips Academy, Andover, in 1962 and from the United States Naval Academy in 1966 and was chosen as a Rhodes Scholar to attend Oxford University. Selected as a naval aviator, he graduated from the U.S. Air Force Test Pilot School and later naval nuclear power training. During the Gulf War, he commanded the aircraft carrier USS Theodore Roosevelt (CVN-71) and commanded the Theodore Roosevelt battle group while assigned as commander, Carrier Group Eight. He commanded the United States Sixth Fleet from 1996 to 1998, and completed his naval career as Deputy Commander-in-Chief, United States European Command.

== Post-military career ==
Abbot retired from the Navy in 2000, and later assumed the position of deputy homeland security advisor to President George W. Bush, a position he held from 2001 to 2003. He then served as the president and CEO of Navy-Marine Corps Relief Society, a private, non-profit organization for assisting Sailors, Marines, and their families until he retired in 2019. He is also active within the Military Officers Association of America, where he sits on several committees. He lives in Arlington, Virginia.

In 2020, Abbot, along with over 130 other former Republican national security officials, signed a statement that asserted that President Trump was unfit to serve another term, and "To that end, we are firmly convinced that it is in the best interest of our nation that Vice President Joe Biden be elected as the next President of the United States, and we will vote for him."

In July 2022, he joined with other former U.S. military leaders in condemning former president and commander in chief, Donald Trump. "While rioters tried to thwart the peaceful transfer of power and ransacked the Capitol on Jan. 6, 2021, the president and commander in chief, Donald Trump, abdicated his duty to preserve, protect and defend the Constitution."

In the 2024 United States presidential election, Abbot endorsed Kamala Harris.
