= Fletcher Peninsula =

Peninsula in Antarctica

Coordinates: 72°45′S 88°50′W

Location of Fletcher Peninsula in Antarctica

Fletcher Peninsula is a broad ice-covered peninsula which extends into the Bellingshausen Sea between the Abbot and Venable ice shelves in Antarctica. It was mapped by the United States Geological Survey from surveys and U.S. Navy air photos, 1961–66, and was named by the Advisory Committee on Antarctic Names for Fred C. Fletcher of Boston, a contributor to the United States Antarctic Service, 1939–41.
