= Bellingshausen Sea =

Marginal sea along the Antarctic Peninsula

Coordinates: 71°S 85°W

- Proposed boundary of the Bellingshausen Sea from the International Hydrographic Organization (IHO).
- Interactive map of Bellingshausen Sea
- Location: Southern Ocean
- Type: Marginal sea
- Etymology: Named after Fabian Gottlieb von Bellingshausen
- Part of: Southern Ocean
- Primary outflows: Antarctic Slope Current
- Surface area: 487,000 km^{2} (188,000 sq mi)
- Max. depth: 4.5 km (2.8 mi)

The Bellingshausen Sea is marginal sea located along the west side of the Antarctic Peninsula between 57°18'W and 102°20'W, west of Alexander Island, east of Cape Flying Fish on Thurston Island, and south of Peter I Island (there the southern Vostokkysten). The Bellingshausen Sea borders the Eights Coast, the Bryan Coast, and the west part of the English Coast in Antarctica. To the west of Cape Flying Fish it joins the Amundsen Sea. The Bellingshausen Sea has an area of 487,000 km^{2} (188,000 sq mi) and reaches a maximum depth of 4.5 kilometers (2.8 mi). It contains the undersea plain Bellingshausen Plain.

The sea takes its name from Fabian Gottlieb von Bellingshausen, a Russian navy officer and cartographer who explored in the Bellingshausen Sea in 1821.

== Oceanography ==
Oceanographically, the Bellingshausen Sea is similar to the Amundsen Sea. Present are two major troughs, to the west is the Belgica Trough while to the east there is the Latady Trough.

The sea is not well-studied with general information on features of the sea such as circulation being recently discovered.

=== Currents ===
The Antarctic Slope Current (ASC) is thought to originate in the Bellingshausen Sea as the result of a density front at the shelf break, rather than being wind-driven.

The water properties of the Bellingshausen Sea effects the water properties of the Amundsen Sea by transporting heat from one sea to another. Meltwater sourced from the ice shelves are transported by currents like the Antarctic Coastal Current into the Amundsen Sea. The sea contains two distinct flows of meltwater that are sourced from the ice shelves. The first meltwater flow is through the Belgica Trough which is sourced from the Venable Ice Shelf. Located west of the Belgica Trough is the Seal Trough where the second meltwater flow goes through. This flow is sourced from the Abbot Ice Shelf. The vertical structure of this flow is different from the first with it occupying greater depths with denser isopycnals.

==== Warming currents ====
Over the past two decades, persistent flow of warm water from Circumpolar Deep Waters has subjected the sea to both warming and shoaling. Warm water is brought to the sea through the Belgica and Latady Troughs where it can then access cavities in the ice shelves. This increase in the temperature by 3 °C has made the area above freezing point which has caused melting to many of the ice shelves surrounding the sea. Currents in the western regions troughs carry meltwater from the ice shelves near the coast and carry the warmed Circumpolar Deep Water to shelf breaks where it has established a shelf break frontal system. This warm water is also carried to the Amundsen Sea. This melting is also aided by the Antarctic Circumpolar Current (ACC) due to its close proximity.

The injection of meltwater into the sea has effects across the continent of Antarctica. While it is injected at deep depths, it can rise to the surface if it is sufficiently buoyant enough given local water stratification. Once it rises to the surface, it can circle the continent effecting the stratification of the ocean and thus altering geostrophic circulation, vertical mixing and vertical and lateral fluxes of heat.

== Geology ==
=== Eltanin crater ===
The sea contains the only known impact in a deep-ocean basin in the world. This crater formed during the early Pleistocene Epoch around 2.15 million years ago when the Eltanin asteroid (about 1-4 km in diameter) impacted at the edge of the Bellingshausen sea.
