= Bryan Coast =

Coast of Antarctica washed by the Bellingshausen Sea

- Coastal region
- Location within Antarctica
- Coordinates: 73°35′S 84°0′W
- Location: Ellsworth Land, Antarctica

Bryan Coast (73°35′S 84°0′W) is the portion of the coast of Antarctica along the south shore of the Bellingshausen Sea between Pfrogner Point and the northern tip of the Rydberg Peninsula. To the west is Eights Coast, and to the east is English Coast.

== Location ==
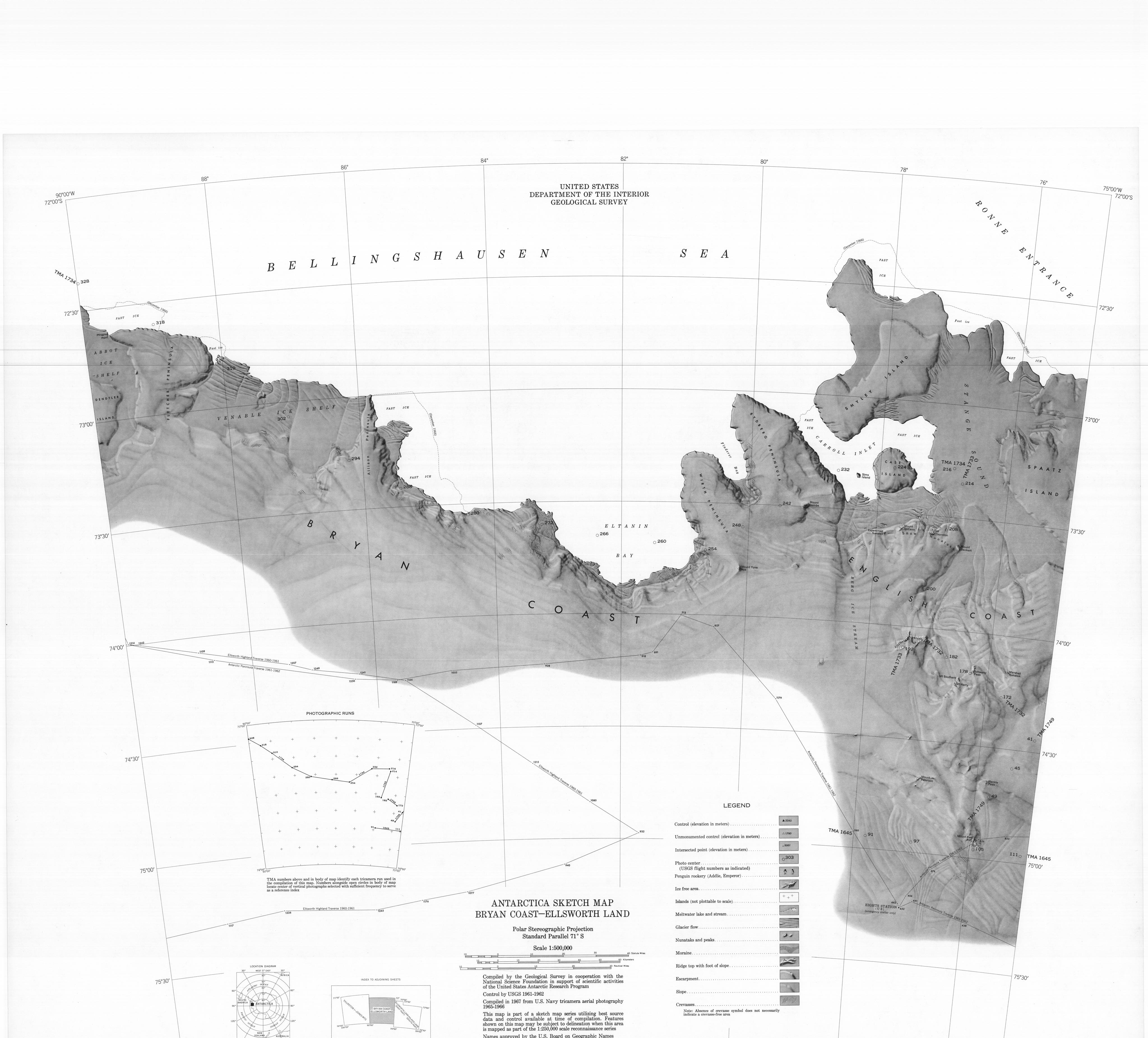
Bryan Coast south of Bellingshausen Sea in west and center of map

The Bryan Coast of Ellsworth Land extends eastward from Pfrogner Point on the northwest tip of the Fletcher Peninsula to the northern tip of the Rydberg Peninsula. Features include, from west to east, Venable Ice Shelf, Allison Peninsula, Eltanin Bay, Mount Tuve, Wirth Peninsula, Fladerer Bay, Rydberg Peninsula and Mount Combs.

== Discovery and name ==
The eastern end of the Bryan Coast was discovered from the air during flights of the United States Antarctic Service (USAS; 1939–41) and the Ronne Antarctic Research Expedition (RARE; 1947–48). The entire coast was mapped by the United States Geological Survey (USGS) from surveys and from U.S. Navy air photos, 1961–67. It was originally named "George Bryan Coast" after R. Admiral George S. Bryan, Hydrographer of the U.S. Navy, 1938–46, under whose direction noteworthy contributions to polar geography were made. The name has been shortened for the sake of brevity.

== Features ==
=== Venable Ice Shelf ===
73°03′S 87°20′W. An ice shelf, 40 nautical miles (74 km; 46 mi) long and 15 nautical miles (28 km; 17 mi) wide, between Fletcher Peninsula and Allison Peninsula. Mapped by USGS from surveys and United States Navy air photos, 1961-66. Named by the United States Advisory Committee on Antarctic Names (US-ACAN) for Commander J.D. Venable, United States Navy, Ships Operations Officer, United States Naval Support Force, Antarctica, 1967 and 1968.

=== Allison Peninsula ===
73°10′S 85°50′W. A narrow ice-covered peninsula which extends into the Bellingshausen Sea from Ellsworth Land. It forms the east margin of the Venable Ice Shelf. Mapped by USGS from surveys and United States Navy air photos, 1961-66. Named by US-ACAN for Commander Paul Allison, United States Navy, Plans Officer, United States Naval Support Force, Antarctica, 1967 and 1968.

=== Eltanin Bay ===
73°40′S 82°00′W. A bay about 35 nautical miles (65 km; 40 mi) wide in southern Bellingshausen Sea. It indents the coast of Ellsworth Land west of Wirth Peninsula. Mapped by USGS from surveys and United States Navy air photos, 1961-66. Named by US-ACAN for the United States Antarctic Research Program (USARP) oceanographic research ship USNS Eltanin which has made numerous research cruises in the South Pacific Ocean.

=== Mount Tuve ===
73°47′S 80°08′W. A mountain 935 metres (3,068 ft) high whose summit rises above the ice surface just south of the base of Wirth Peninsula. Discovered by RARE, 1947-48, under Finn Ronne. He named it for Merle Tuve, Director of the Department of Terrestrial Magnetism of Carnegie Institution, Washington, DC, who furnished instruments for the expedition.

=== Wirth Peninsula ===
73°27′S 80°40′W. A broad ice-covered peninsula, 20 nautical miles (37 km; 23 mi) long, between Eltanin Bay and Fladerer Bay. Mapped by USGS from surveys and United States Navy air photos, 1961-66. Named by US-ACAN for Captain Laurence Wirth, commander of USNS Eltanin on Antarctic cruises, September 1966-November 1967.

=== Fladerer Bay ===
73°15′S 80°20′W. A bay about 15 nautical miles (28 km; 17 mi) long and 6 nautical miles (11 km; 6.9 mi) wide between Wirth Peninsula and Rydberg Peninsula. Mapped by USGS from surveys and United States Navy air photos, 1961-66. Named by US-ACAN for Captain George Fladerer, commander of USNS Eltanin on Antarctic cruises.

=== Rydberg Peninsula ===
73°10′S 79°45′W. A broad ice-covered peninsula, 30 nautical miles (56 km; 35 mi) long, between Fladerer Bay and Carroll Inlet. Mapped by USGS from surveys and United States Navy air photos, 1961-66. Named by US-ACAN for Captain Sven Rydberg, commander of United States NavyS Eltanin on Antarctic cruises, February 1962 to June 1963.

=== Mount Combs ===
73°29′S 79°09′W. An isolated mountain rising above the ice surface at the base of Rydberg Peninsula. Discovered by the RARE (1947-48) under Finn Ronne, who named it for Representative J.M. Combs of Beaumont, Texas, who did much to gain support for the expedition.

== Sources ==
- Alberts, Fred G., ed. (1995), Geographic Names of the Antarctic (PDF) (2 ed.), United States Board on Geographic Names This article incorporates public domain material from websites or documents of the United States Board on Geographic Names.
- Bryan Coast to Ellsworth Land, USGS: United States Geological Survey
- This article incorporates public domain material from websites or documents of the United States Geological Survey.
