= English Coast =

Coast in Antarctica

Coordinates: 73°30′S 73°0′W

Northern part on Antarctic Peninsula

The English Coast or Robert English Coast is a portion of the coast of Antarctica between the northern tip of Rydberg Peninsula and the Buttress Nunataks, on the west side of Palmer Land. To the west is Bryan Coast, and northward runs Rymill Coast east of Alexander Island across George VI Sound. This coast was discovered and explored in 1940, on land by Finn Ronne and Carl R. Eklund and from the air by other members of the East Base of the United States Antarctic Service (USAS), 1939–41. It was originally named "Robert English Coast" after Captain Robert A. J. English, US Navy, Executive Secretary of USAS, 1939–41, and formerly Captain of the Bear of Oakland on the Byrd Antarctic Expedition, 1933–35. The name is shortened for the sake of brevity.

The English Coast is divided between Palmer Land on the Antarctic Peninsula and Ellsworth Land to the south and west.
