= List of glaciers of Wilkes Land =

Location of Wilkes Land (red), Australian Antarctic Territory in Antarctica

Following is a list of glaciers of Wilkes Land in Antarctica. This list may not reflect recently named glaciers in Wilkes Land.

- Adams Glacier
- Bell Glacier
- Blair Glacier
- Blodgett Iceberg Tongue
- Bond Glacier
- Conger Glacier
- De Haven Glacier
- Dibble Glacier
- Dibble Iceberg Tongue
- DuBeau Glacier
- Elliott Glacier
- Freeman Glacier
- Frost Glacier
- Gilchrist Glacier
- Glenzer Glacier
- Holmes Glacier
- May Glacier
- Peterson Glacier
- Pourquoi Pas Glacier
- Remenchus Glacier
- Robinson Glacier
- Sandford Glacier
- Snedeker Glacier
- Thompson Glacier
- Totten Glacier
- Tracy Glacier
- Underwood Glacier
- Vanderford Glacier
- Waldron Glacier
- Whittle Glacier
- Williamson Glacier
