= Diplomacy of the American Civil War =

Dark Blue: Free States Light Blue: Slave states that did not secede Red: Confederate States Gray: Non-autonomous territories

The diplomacy of the American Civil War involved the relations of the United States and the Confederate States of America with the major world powers during the American Civil War of 1861–1865. The United States prevented other powers from recognizing the Confederacy, which counted heavily on Britain and France to enter the war on its side to maintain their supply of cotton and to weaken a growing opponent. Every nation was officially neutral throughout the war, and none formally recognized the Confederacy.

The European Atlantic nations, the Empire of Brazil, and the Kingdom of Hawaii recognized that the Confederacy had certain rights as an organized belligerent, which for example allowed Confederate ships to dock at their ports for 24 hours, or more in case of repairs or adverse weather. A few took advantage of the war to contest the Monroe Doctrine when the United States was unable to enforce it. Spain annexed the Dominican Republic between 1861 and 1865. More threatening was the Second French intervention in Mexico under Emperor Napoleon III, who installed Maximilian I as a puppet ruler and aimed to diminish US influence in Latin America. France encouraged Britain to join in a policy of mediation, suggesting that both recognize the Confederacy, while Abraham Lincoln warned that any such recognition was tantamount to a declaration of war. The British textile industry depended on cotton from the South, but it had stocks to keep the mills operating for a year and, in any case, the industrialists and workers carried little weight in British politics. Knowing a war would cut off vital shipments of American food, wreak havoc on the British merchant fleet, and cause an invasion of Canada, Britain and its powerful Royal Navy refused to join France.

Historians emphasize that Union diplomacy proved generally effective, with expert diplomats handling numerous crises. British leaders had some sympathy for the Confederacy, but were never willing to risk war with the Union. France was even more sympathetic to the Confederacy, but it was threatened by Prussia and would not make a move without full British cooperation. Confederate diplomats were inept, or as historian Charles M. Hubbard put it, "Poorly chosen diplomats produce poor diplomacy." Other countries played a minor role. Russia made a show of support of the Union, but its importance has often been exaggerated.

== United States ==
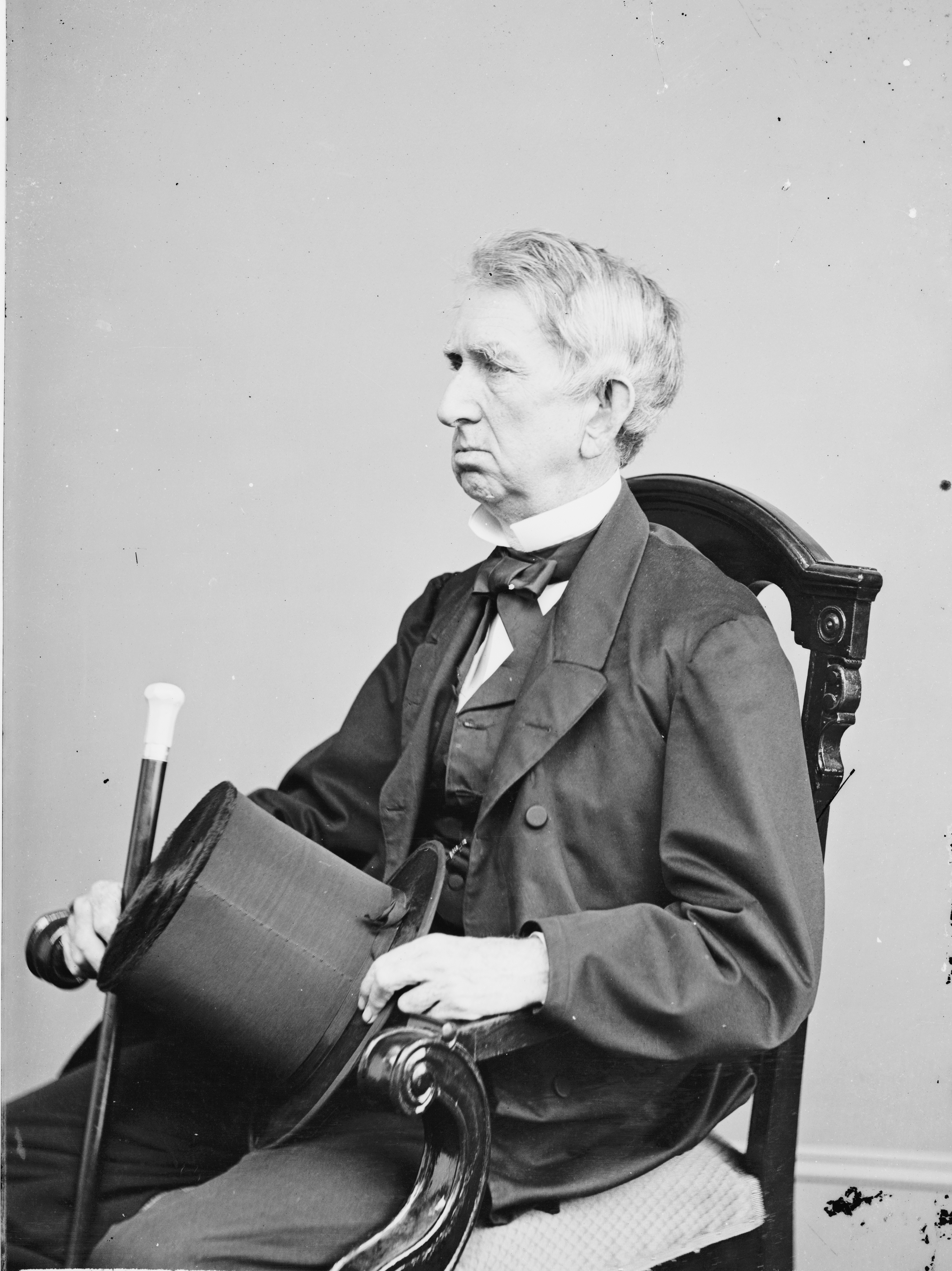
William Seward between 1861 and 1865

For decades historians have debated who played the most important roles in shaping Union diplomacy. During the early 20th century, Secretary of State William H. Seward was seen as an Anglophobe who dominated a weak president. Lincoln's reputation was restored by Jay Monaghan who, in 1945, emphasized Lincoln's quiet effectiveness behind the scenes. In 1976, Norman Ferris published a study of Seward's foreign policy, emphasizing his leadership role. Lincoln continues to get high marks for his moral leadership in defining the meaning of the conflict in terms of democracy and freedom. Numerous monographs have highlighted the leadership role of Charles Sumner as head of the Senate Foreign Relations Committee, and Charles Francis Adams as minister to the Court of St James's (United Kingdom). Historians have studied Washington's team of hard-working diplomats, financiers and spies across Europe.

Lincoln's foreign policy was deficient in 1861, and he failed to garner public support in Europe. Diplomats had to explain that the United States was not committed to abolishing slavery, instead appealing to the unconstitutionality of secession. Confederate spokesmen, on the other hand, were much more successful: ignoring slavery and instead focusing on their struggle for liberty, their commitment to free trade, and the essential role of cotton in the European economy. Most European leaders were unimpressed with the Union's legal and constitutional arguments and thought it hypocritical that the U.S. should seek to deny to one of its regions the same sort of independence it won from Great Britain some eight decades earlier. Furthermore, since the Union was not committed to ending slavery, it struggled to persuade Europeans (especially Britons) that there was no moral equivalency between the rebels who established the United States in 1776 and the rebels who established the Confederate States in 1861. Even more importantly, the European aristocracy (the dominant factor in every major country) was "absolutely gleeful in pronouncing the American debacle as proof that the entire experiment in popular government had failed. European government leaders welcomed the fragmentation of the ascendant American Republic."

A major setback was that the United States had been alone among the world's maritime powers in not joining the 1856 Paris Declaration Respecting Maritime Law, which banned privateering, established that neutral ships with non-contraband goods were to be free from seizure in wartime, and that a naval blockade had to be effective to be legal (i.e., that a nation declaring a blockade must be able to enforce it for it to receive international acceptance). When the war began, the Confederacy commissioned privateers and used neutral ships as runners against the Union blockade of its ports. The Lincoln administration attempted to join the Paris Declaration in 1861 but was rebuffed by Great Britain and France, who accused the Union of trying to use European navies to wage maritime war against the Confederates.

The occupation of New Orleans by major general Benjamin Butler in 1862 was another diplomatic liability for the Lincoln administration. Butler ordered to treat women who insulted federal troops "as women of the town plying their avocation", which was denounced by British prime minister Lord Palmerston, and also seized money and specie from the Dutch, French, Spanish, and Belgian consulates under claims that they were used to fund the Confederates. Lincoln sympathized with Butler but Seward advocated for his recall and to return all seized valuables as to not alienate European governments that might recognize the Confederacy.

== Confederate States ==
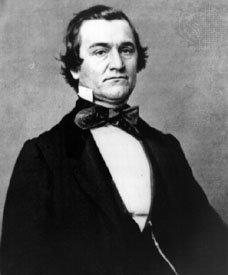
William Lowndes Yancey

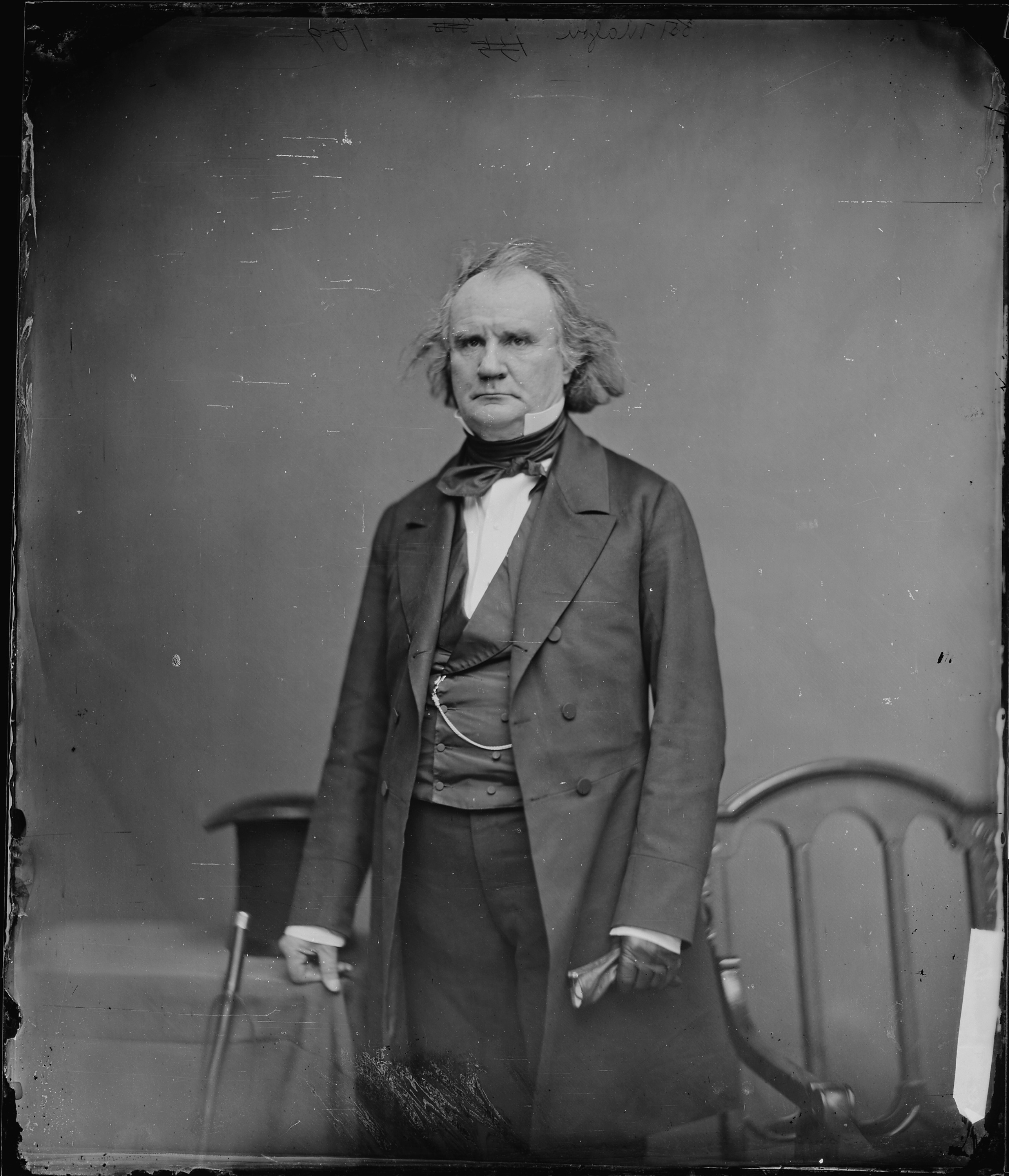
James Murray Mason

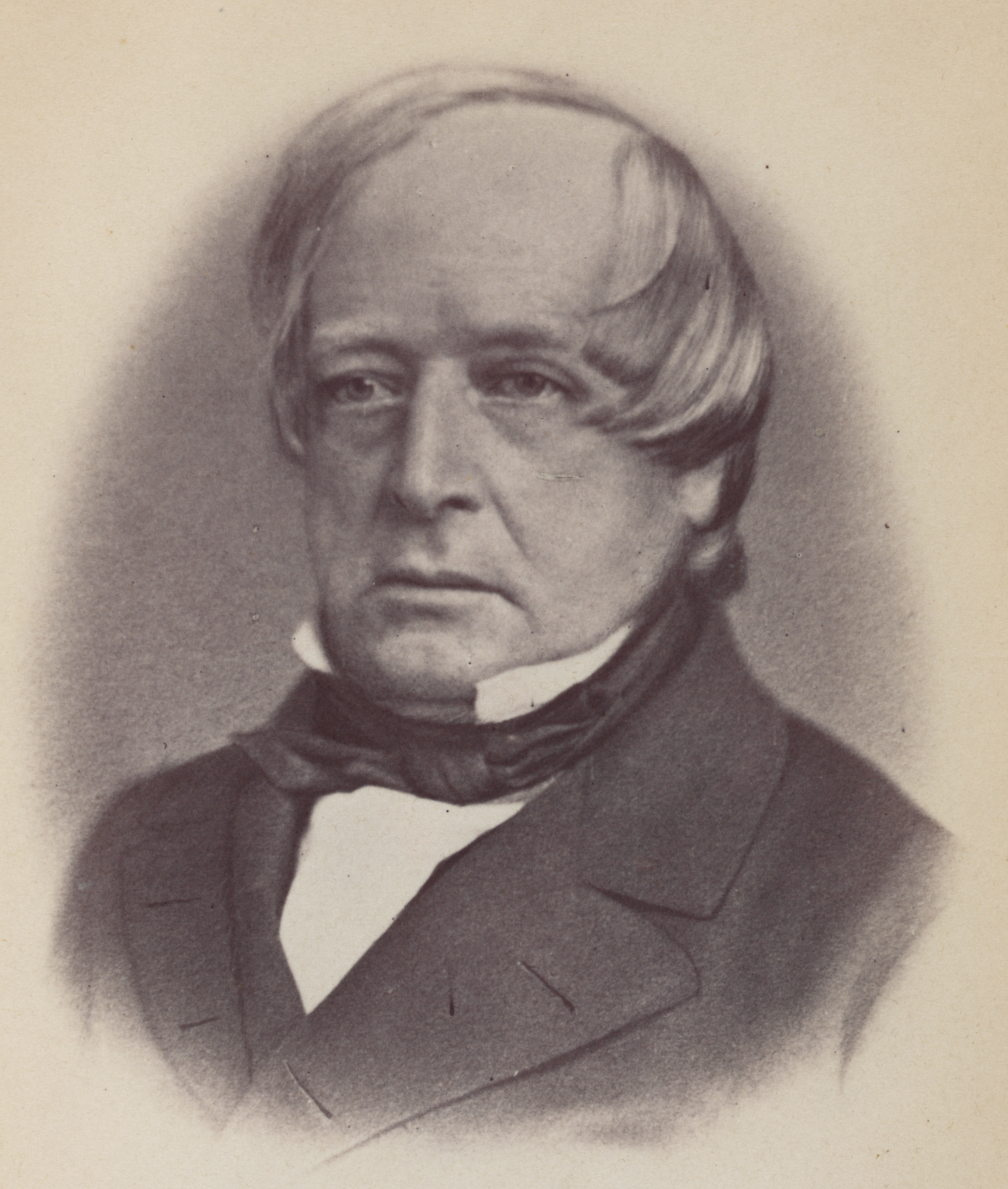
John Slidell

Even the most avid promoters of secession had paid little attention to European affairs prior to 1860. The Confederates had for years uncritically assumed that "cotton is king", therefore European countries would have to support the Confederacy's independence to secure their source of cotton. However, this assumption was disproven during the war. Peter Parish argued that southern intellectual and cultural insularity proved fatal:

For years before the war the South had been building a wall around its perimeter, to protect itself from dangerous agitators and subversive ideas, and now those inside the wall could no longer see over the top, out to what lay beyond.

The Confederate government sent delegations to Europe but they were ineffective in achieving their diplomatic aims. The first emissaries (William Lowndes Yancey, Pierre Adolphe Rost, and Ambrose Dudley Mann) were named by the provisional Confederate States Congress before hostilities began, in February 1861, and instructed by secretary of state Robert Toombs to proceed to London, then to the courts of Napoleon III of France, Alexander II of Russia, and Leopold I of Belgium after they had secured British diplomatic recognition. Journalist Edwin de Leon was the emissaries' main adviser and chief propagandist in Europe. However, the United Kingdom was not as dependent on Southern cotton as believed; it had enough stock to last for over a year and developed alternative sources of cotton, most notably in British India and Ottoman Egypt. Meanwhile, the Confederate national government lost control of this tool when cotton planters, factors, and financiers spontaneously decided to embargo shipments of cotton to Europe in early 1861. It was an enormously expensive mistake, depriving the Confederacy of millions of dollars in cash it would desperately need.

None of the early Confederate emissaries had background in diplomatic relations. The leader, Yancey, was a popular Fire-Eater before the war and was chosen mainly to remove him as a competitor to Jefferson Davis for the Confederate presidency. In Europe, Yancey was perceived as demanding and arrogant, and his outspoken defense of states' rights, and past calls for the constitutional protection of slavery and re-establishment of the transatlantic slave trade were received with bewilderment. Meanwhile, Rost's Louisiana French was perceived as crude and clumsy when he traveled to Paris in an attempt to get over the impasse caused by the refusal of British foreign secretary John Russell to meet with the Confederates. Toombs, who would later oppose the attack on Fort Sumter, had envisioned a peaceful secession and believed that foreign recognition would be secured with little effort; he instructed the emissaries to stress states' rights as the reason for secession to the detriment of any other factor, but this wasn't considered an important issue by Europeans. Once war began, the emissaries failed to address concerns like the Union blockade of Southern ports, European trade with the North, northern wheat imports to Great Britain, Europe's general aversion to privateering and slavery, and Franco-Spanish ambitions in Mexico and Hispaniola. In contrast, the Union only had to mobilize the United States's established pre-war diplomatic apparatus to outclass the Confederates, whose own communications with Europe became increasingly slow and infrequent as the blockade took hold. All foreign ambassadors were in Washington, D.C.; only a few consuls resided in the South, mostly in port cities, and their exchequer was held at the pleasure of the Lincoln administration. Immediately after the outbreak of hostilities, Seward declared that all foreign consuls in the areas of insurrection were expected to transact official business only through their ministers in Washington, and that any direct communication with Confederate officials would jeopardize their diplomatic status. This maneouvre successfully excluded Confederate representatives from official diplomatic circles, both at home and abroad.

Realizing the failure of Yancey's mission, Davis and the new secretary of state Robert M. T. Hunter replaced him with two seasoned diplomats, James Murray Mason who went to London and John Slidell to Paris. Mason was a former member of the Foreign Relations Committee, and Slidell the negotiator of an armistice near the end of the Mexican-American War. The new envoys were to highlight the growth of the Confederacy with the addition of the border states, a proposal for a commercial alliance of the South with Britain and France as a counterweight to the North's manufacturing and maritime expansion, and the illegality and ineptitude of the Union blockade. To show the latter they carried a list of Confederate ships that had successfully evaded the blockade, but this point was immediately countered by the capture of Mason and Slidell themselves by the USS San Jacinto while they were traveling aboard the British ship RMS Trent on November 8, 1861. The Trent affair was a major diplomatic crisis between Great Britain and the Union, but Yancey and the Confederate government failed to exploit it, and the issue was resolved with the swift release of Mason and Slidell. Once in Europe, poor communications with Richmond prevented Mason and Slidell from using European anger over the Trent and the "Stone Fleet" in Charleston Harbor in a timely and adequate manner, while Seward and the Union's ministers Charles Francis Adams and William L. Dayton succeeded in appeasing the Europeans and prevented a joint Anglo-French intervention to open the Southern ports. Unlike their predecessors, Mason was received by Russell and Slidell by French foreign minister Édouard de Thouvenel, but they also failed to secure diplomatic recognition.

By early 1862, vice president Alexander H. Stephens and others considered Confederate diplomatic efforts such failures that he suggested withdrawing all agents and representatives from abroad and using the resources on the battlefield. Davis ignored this and appointed Judah P. Benjamin as secretary of state, who worked to forge a closer relationship with France, sell cotton at "remarkably low prices" and engage in arms purchases from French and British suppliers to link their commercial interests more closely with the Confederacy. These Confederate purchasing agents, often working with blockade runners funded by British financiers, were more successful. James Dunwoody Bulloch was the mastermind behind the procurement of warships for the Confederate Navy. Confederate propagandists, especially the former U.S.-appointed diplomats Henry Hotze and James Williams, were partly effective in mobilizing European public opinion. Hotze used liberal arguments of self-determination in favor of national independence, echoing the failed European revolutions of 1848. He also promised that the Confederacy would be a low-tariff nation in contrast to the high-tariff United States and consistently emphasized that the cotton shortages in Britain were caused by the Union blockade of Southern ports.

In March 1862 James M. Mason teamed with several British politicians to push the government to ignore the Union blockade. Mason argued that it was only an unenforceable "paper blockade", which violated international law. However, most British politicians rejected this interpretation because it was counter to traditional British views on blockades, which Britain saw as one of its most effective naval weapons, as demonstrated by the French Revolutionary and Napoleonic Wars.

In 1863, the House of Commons voted against recognizing the Confederacy. This was followed by a de facto diplomatic crisis that soured Southern relations with Britain, France, and Spain. Benjamin banned foreign residents from communicating with their diplomats in Washington, and all foreign diplomats were expelled from Confederate-held territory in October. The situation was so dismal that even De Leon called for the recall of all Southern agents from Europe.

On December 27, 1864, Davis sent Duncan F. Kenner to Britain and France with a proposal for gradual emancipation as a last-ditch attempt to gain international recognition. Due to the Union blockade of Southern ports, Kenner was forced to infiltrate Union territory and board a ship in New York City, sailing for Europe on February 11, 1865. When announced, the proposal caused widespread confusion and opposition in the Confederacy, as many, including Hunter and Robert P. Dick, didn't understand the war to be in defense of anything but slavery. Kenner was still trying to get an audience in mid-April, when news of the fall of Richmond reached Europe and he deserted his post.

== Colonial Powers ==
=== United Kingdom ===
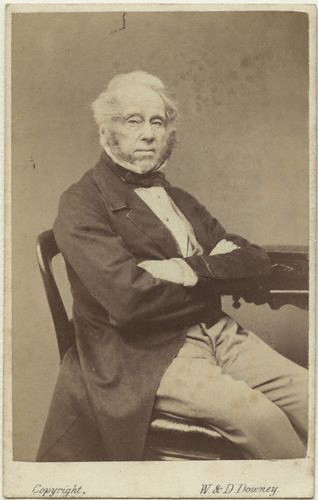
Lord Palmerston, pictured in 1863, was British prime minister throughout the war.

The British cabinet made the major decisions for war and peace and played a cautious hand, realizing the risk it would have on trade. Frederick Law Olmsted's book The Cotton Kingdom was published in England and "helped sway British public opinion toward the Union cause".

Throughout the war, large-scale trade with the United States continued in both directions, both legally and illegally. The Americans shipped grain to Britain while Britain sent manufactured items and munitions. Immigration continued into the United States as well. British trade with the Confederacy fell by 95 percent, with only a trickle of cotton going to Britain and hundreds of thousands of munitions slipping in by small blockade runners, most of them owned and operated by British interests.

Prime Minister Lord Palmerston was sympathetic to the Confederacy. Although a professed opponent of the slave trade and slavery, he held a lifelong hostility towards the United States and believed a dissolution of the Union would weaken the United States – thereby enhancing British power – and that the Confederacy "would afford a valuable and extensive market for British manufactures".

Britain issued a proclamation of neutrality on 13 May 1861. The Confederacy was recognized as a belligerent, but not as a sovereign state, since Washington threatened to treat recognition as a hostile action. Britain depended more on American food imports than on Confederate cotton, and a war with the U.S. would not be in Britain's economic interest. Palmerston ordered reinforcements sent to the Province of Canada because he was convinced that the Union would make peace with the South and then invade Canada. He was pleased with the Confederate victory at Bull Run in July 1861, but 15 months later he wrote that:

The American War ... has manifestly ceased to have any attainable object as far as the Northerns are concerned, except to get rid of some more thousand troublesome Irish and Germans. It must be owned, however, that the Anglo-Saxon race on both sides have shown courage and endurance highly honourable to their stock.

==== Trent Affair ====
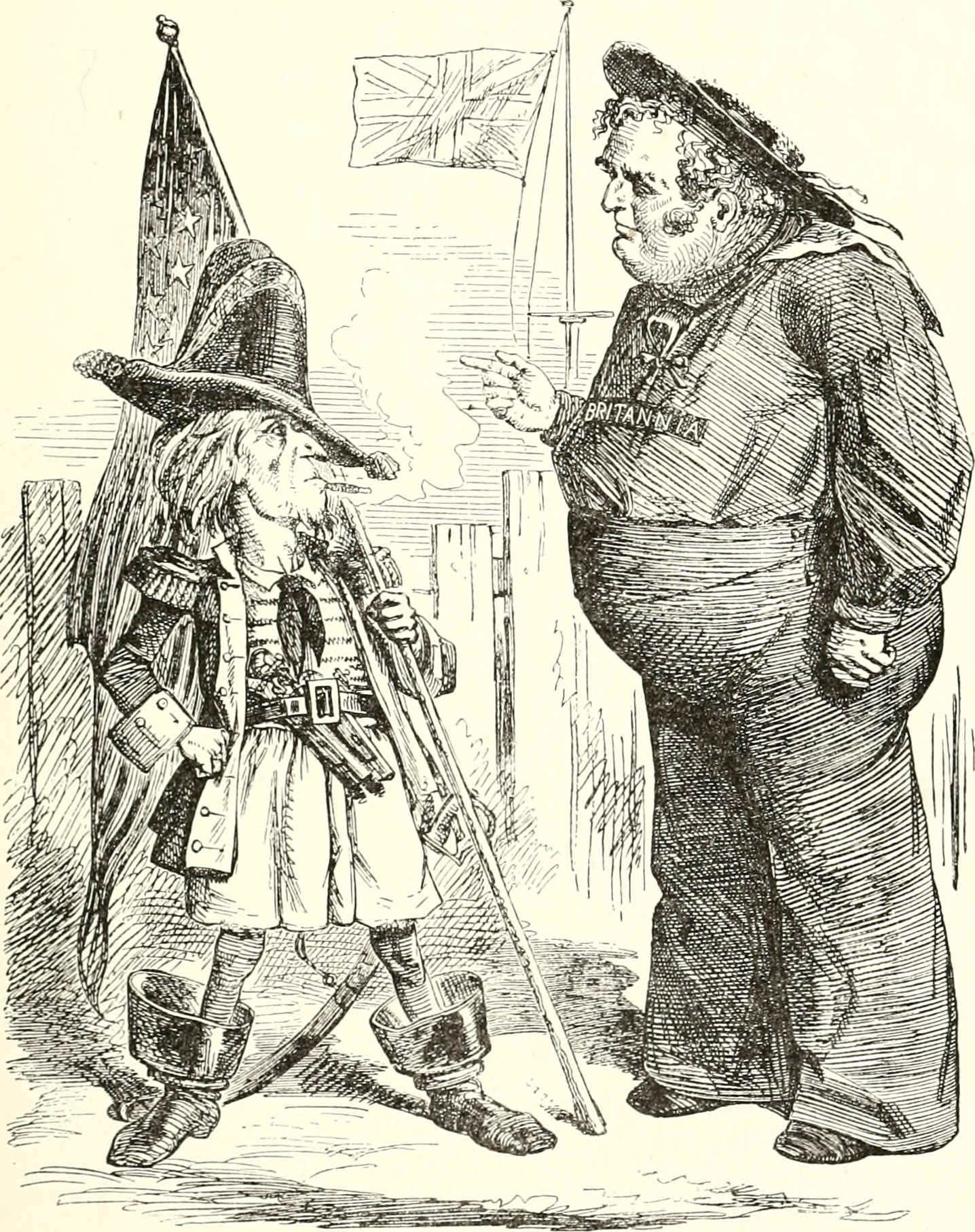
A December 1861 cartoon in Punch magazine in London ridicules American aggressiveness in the Trent Affair. John Bull, at right, warns Uncle Sam, "You do what's right, my son, or I'll blow you out of the water."

A diplomatic crisis with the United States erupted over the Trent Affair in November 1861. The USS San Jacinto seized the Confederate diplomats James M. Mason and John Slidell from the British steamer RMS Trent. Public opinion in the United States celebrated the capture of the rebel emissaries.

The US action provoked outrage in Britain. Palmerston called the action "a declared and gross insult", sent a note insisting on the release of the two diplomats, and ordered 3,000 troops to Canada. In a letter to Queen Victoria on 5 December 1861, he said that if his demands were not met, "Great Britain is in a better state than at any former time to inflict a severe blow upon and to read a lesson to the United States which will not soon be forgotten." In another letter to his Foreign Secretary, he predicted war between Britain and the Union:

It is difficult not to come to the conclusion that the rabid hatred of England which animates the exiled Irishmen who direct almost all the Northern newspapers, will so excite the masses as to make it impossible for Lincoln and Seward to grant our demands; and we must therefore look forward to war as the probable result.

However, the Queen's husband, Prince Albert, intervened. He worked to have Palmerston's note "toned down" to a demand for an explanation, and apology, for a mistake.

Despite public approval of the seizure, Lincoln recognized that the United States could not afford to fight Britain, and that the modified note could be accepted. The United States released the prisoners to the HMS Rinaldo in January 1862. Palmerston was convinced that the increased troops in Canada persuaded the United States to acquiesce. However, the Lincoln administration did not apologize for the incident, nor forswear similar seizures happening in the future.

The incident delayed Mason and Slidell's mission at a critical time when Europeans were discussing recognition, and by the time they arrived, "the emphasis of Confederate diplomacy had shifted from demands for recognition to denunciations of the blockade, a less effective issue for encouraging international intervention in support of the South". In addition, the inability of the CSA to break the blockade or defend its port cities from occupation became a reason for non-intervention.

==== "King Cotton" ====
The British Industrial Revolution was fueled by the expansion of textile production, which in turn was based mostly on cotton imported from the American South. The war cut off supplies, and by 1862, stocks had run out, and imports from Egypt and India could not make up the deficit. There was enormous hardship for the factory owners and especially the unemployed factory workers. The issues facing the British textile industry factored into the debate over intervening on behalf of the Confederacy to break the Union blockade and regain access to Southern cotton.

Historians continue to be sharply divided on the question of British public opinion. One school argues that the aristocracy favored the Confederacy, while the abolitionist Union was championed by British liberals and radical spokesmen for the working class. An opposing school argues that many British working men—perhaps a majority—were more sympathetic to the Confederate cause. Finally, a third school emphasizes the complexity of the issue and notes that most Britons did not express an opinion on the matter. Local studies have demonstrated that some towns and neighborhoods took one position, while nearby areas took the opposite. The most detailed study by Richard J. M. Blackett, noting that there was enormous variation across Britain, argues that the working class and religious nonconformists were inclined to support the Union, while support for the Confederacy came mostly from conservatives who were opposed to reform movements inside Britain and from high Church Anglicans.

==== Humanitarian intervention ====
The question of British and French intervention was on the agenda in 1862. Palmerston was especially concerned with the economic crisis in the Lancashire textile mills, as the supply of cotton had largely run out and unemployment was soaring. He seriously considered breaking the Union blockade of Southern ports to obtain the cotton. But by this time the United States Navy was large enough to threaten the British merchant fleet, and Canada could be captured easily. A new dimension came when Lincoln announced the preliminary Emancipation Proclamation in September 1862. Many British leaders expected an all-out race war to break out in the American South, with so many tens or hundreds of thousands of deaths that humanitarian intervention was called for to prevent the threatened bloodshed. Chancellor of the Exchequer William Gladstone opened a cabinet debate over whether Britain should intervene. Gladstone had a favorable image of the Confederacy and urged humanitarian intervention because of the staggering death toll, the risk of a race war, and the failure of the Union to achieve decisive military results.

In rebuttal, Secretary of War Sir George Cornewall Lewis opposed intervention as a high-risk proposition that could result in massive losses. Furthermore, Palmerston had other concerns, including a crisis concerning King Otto of Greece, in which Russia threatened to take advantage of the weaknesses of the Ottoman Empire. The Cabinet decided that the American situation was less urgent than the need to contain Russian expansion, so it rejected intervention. Palmerston rejected Napoleon III of France's proposal for the two powers to arbitrate the war and ignored all further efforts of the Confederacy to gain British recognition.

==== Blockade runners ====
Several British financiers built and operated most of the blockade runners, spending hundreds of millions of pounds on them. They were staffed by sailors and officers on leave from the Royal Navy and regularly used the British territories of Bahamas, Bermuda, and Nova Scotia as strategic stopovers. When the U.S. Navy captured one of the blockade runners, it sold the ship and cargo as a prize of war for the American sailors, then released the crew. During the war, British blockade runners delivered the Confederacy 60 percent of its weapons, 1/3 of the lead for its bullets, 3/4 of ingredients for its powder, and most of the cloth for its uniforms; this assistance may have lengthened the Civil War by two years and cost 400,000 lives of soldiers and civilians on both sides.

==== CSS Alabama ====
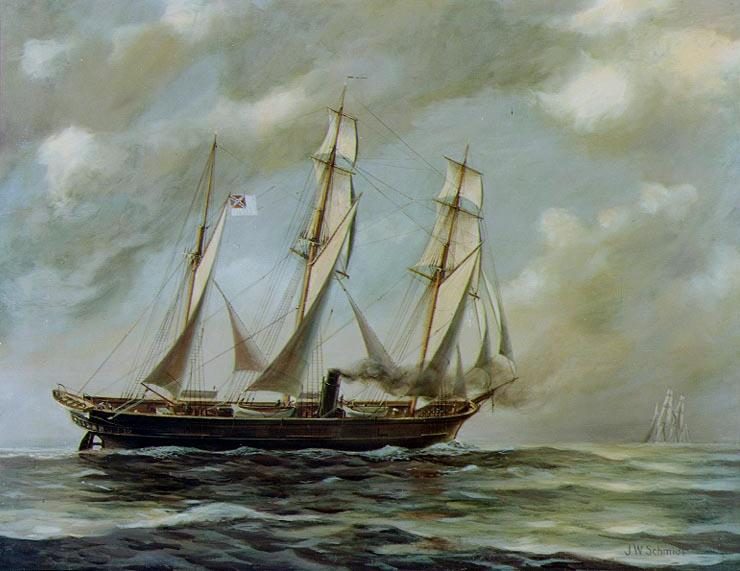
CSS Alabama by J.W. Schmidt (1961)

A long-term issue was the British shipyard (John Laird and Sons) building two warships for the Confederacy, notably the CSS Alabama, over vehement protests from the United States government. The controversy was resolved after the war in the Treaty of Washington which included the resolution of the Alabama Claims whereby Britain gave the United States $15.5 million after arbitration by an international tribunal for damages caused by British-built warships.

==== Ireland ====
Millions of Irish people emigrated to the United States during the 19th century, particularly after the Great Famine of 1845–1852. The process continued during the Civil War after crop failures in 1861 and 1862, but immigrants settled exclusively in the North because of the Union blockade of Southern ports. A minimum of 144,000 Irish-born men, plus 90,000 born in the United States to Irish parents, fought for the Union, compared to an estimated 20,000 to 30,000 of both groups who fought for the Confederacy. Union recruiters were active in Ireland and sometimes employed fraudulent methods such as getting men drunk or luring them to America with false jobs offers before coercing them to sign up for the army. The Irish Catholic Church denounced emigration, and the British government tried to curb it by enforcing the long-ignored Foreign Enlistment Act 1819. In 1863, Judah Benjamin and Jefferson Davis recruited the Irish chaplain of the First Missouri Brigade, John B. Bannon, to join Captain James L. Capston in a propaganda campaign in Ireland that was intended both to dissuade the population from emigrating to America during the war and to promote sympathy for the Confederacy. Bannon was helped by John MacHale, archbishop of Tuam, and John Martin, a Young Irelander critical of Thomas Francis Meagher, the commander of the Irish Brigade of the Union Army.

==== Canada ====
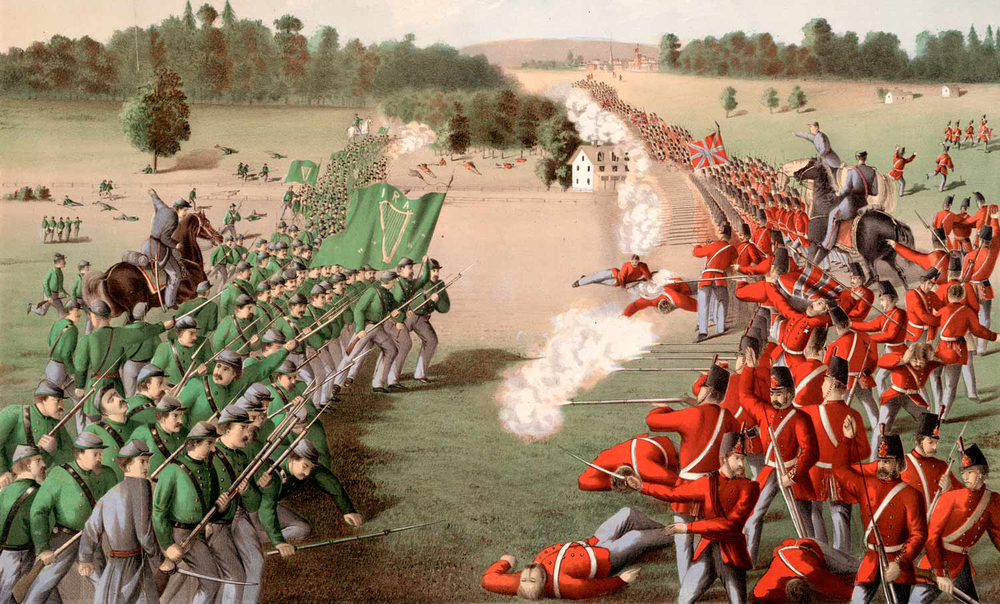
Fenians charging the British lines at the Battle of Ridgeway

The Union successfully recruited soldiers in British North America, and local officials tolerated the presence of Confederate agents despite Union protests. These agents planned attacks on U.S. cities and encouraged antiwar sentiment. In late 1864, Bennett H. Young led a small cavalry raid on St. Albans, Vermont, where he robbed three banks of $208,000 and killed one American. The raiders escaped back into Canada where they were arrested, but were released after a court ruled that they had followed military orders and extradition would be a breach of neutrality. The bounty was returned to Vermont.

The St. Albans raid angered Americans. The Irish republicans of the Fenian Brotherhood, many of them veterans of the American Civil War themselves, were permitted to openly organize on U.S. soil and launch several raids into Canada between 1866 and 1871. London formed the Canadian Confederation in 1867, in part as a way to meet the American challenge without relying on support from the British military.

==== Slave trade ====
The British had long pressured the United States to increase their efforts to suppress the transatlantic slave trade, which both nations had abolished in 1807. Pressure from Southern states had neutralized this, but the Lincoln administration was now eager to sign up. In the Lyons–Seward Treaty of 1862, the United States gave Great Britain full authority to crack down on the transatlantic slave trade when carried on by American slave ships.

=== France ===
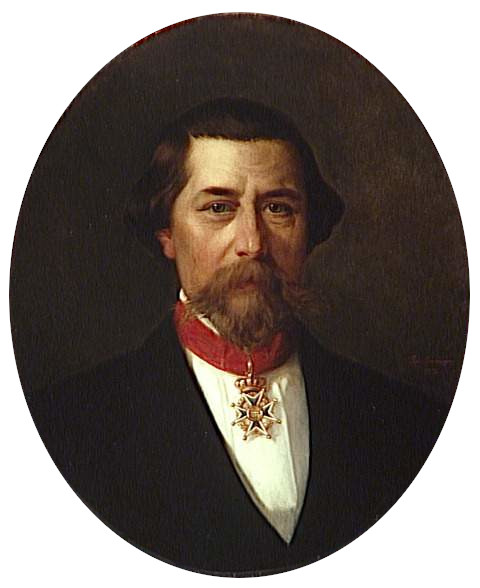
Pierre-Paul Pecquet du Bellet, unofficial diplomatic agent of the Confederate States of America in France

The Second French Empire under Napoleon III remained officially neutral throughout the Civil War and never recognized the Confederate States of America. It did recognize Confederate belligerency on 10 June 1861, one month after Britain. The textile industry needed cotton, and Napoleon III had imperial ambitions in Mexico, which could be greatly aided by the Confederacy. The United States had warned that recognition meant war. France was reluctant to act alone without British collaboration, and the British rejected intervention. Napoleon III realized that a war with the U.S. without allies "would spell disaster" for France. On the advice of his two foreign ministers Édouard de Thouvenel and Edouard Drouyn de Lhuys, Napoleon III adopted a cautious attitude and maintained diplomatically correct relations with Washington. Half the French press favored the Union, while the "imperial" press was more sympathetic to the Confederacy. The public generally ignored the war, showing more interest in Mexico. The Mexican campaign was protested and treated as a hostile act by the Union, while the Confederacy tolerated it in an effort to court French support and recognition.

In 1863 Confederate diplomatic efforts moved their focus from Britain to France, with the Union's counter-diplomacy following. Weapons purchases also moved almost exclusively to France after the Union successfully argued in court that Confederate weapons purchases were a breach of British neutrality. Napoleon III's offers to mediate peace between the Union and the Confederacy were angrily rejected by Seward, and by 1864 he lost interest due to the lack of decisive Confederate victories and the outbreaks of the January uprising and the Second Schleswig War in Europe.

Near the end of the war, representatives at the 1865 Hampton Roads Conference briefly discussed a proposal for a north–south reconciliation by a joint action against the French in Mexico. In his reply to an 1866 French request for neutrality, Seward said that French withdrawal should be unconditional, and the French agreed to withdraw from Mexico by 1867.

==== La Patrie Affair ====
There was a small diplomatic tiff from late 1863 to 1864 when the commerce raider CSS Georgia, headed by Captain William Lewis Maury forced themselves aboard the ship La Patrie of Marseille. La Patrie was nearly dead in the water when the CSS Georgia came upon her in late 1863. Captain Maury sent a small party of sailors to board her and inspect her cargo. The Captain of La Patrie initially rebuffed the Confederate yelling across the water, he was a "Frenchman and would not stop for a pirate."

This resulted in Captain Maury sending a boat aside the brig, board her, and inspect her papers, but use no force. This was intended by the Captain to force unofficial recognition of the crew as a legitimate state actor. The Captain of La Patrie removed his sword from its scabbard and once again refused the Confederates the opportunity to board. Captain Maury then fired a blank shot which was ignored by the French vessel. In a last ditch effort to force the vessel to stop and allow themselves to be boarded, a live round was fired into the sea just beneath the ship's bow.

The ship then stopped and the Confederates were allowed to board. The boarding officer was then ushered into the Captain's quarters and allowed to view the ship's manifest, and the French captain opened a bottle of champagne to "celebrate" the occasion. The incident caused a minor uproar in Paris, as well as major concern for the future of Georgia given that she was due in Cherbourg to link up with the CSS Rappahannock. Unbeknownst to the crew of Georgia, Rappahannock was laid up in a berth in Calais due to having burned her bearings out while exiting the Thames. In a stroke of luck, Georgia happened to find a stricken French brig which had been listing so badly her gunwales nearly touched the water, she had slowed to a crawl and had run out of drinking water and provisions. Georgia was able to render aid, righting the ship and donating provisions and fresh water, which in turn was able to assuage an angered French public. Georgia, then was able to slip into Cherbourg under cover of night and berthed for badly needed repairs.

=== Spain ===
Spain was a target of intense diplomatic efforts by the Union and the Confederacy. At the beginning of the war, both sides believed that Spain was the European country most likely to recognize the Confederacy, due to long poor diplomatic relations with the United States and the persistence of slavery in Spanish Cuba and Puerto Rico. For her part, Spain appreciated that a successful rebellion would reduce American expansionism and allow for the recovery of Spanish influence in Hispanic America, but was reluctant to intervene unilaterally due to long-standing policies of cooperation with Britain and France, and of avoiding conflict with the United States.

The Confederacy, represented by Pierre Rost in Madrid and Charles J. Helm in Havana, offered a defensive alliance, the withdrawal of any claims over Cuba, and the recognition of the 1861 annexation of the Dominican Republic to Spain. The Union, represented by Carl Schurz and Carolina Coronado's husband Horatio J. Perry, reminded that it had been Southerners who wanted to annex Cuba in the first place, steered the Union Navy away from Cuban and Dominican waters to prevent naval incidents, and gave Spanish diplomats and attachés unprecedented access to American weapons and military installations – which, while appearing amicable, had the true purpose of dissuading Spain from recognizing the Confederacy by showing the strength of the Union. The Union protested the Dominican annexation, but refrained from recognizing the Second Dominican Republic or supporting it during the Dominican Restoration War. Nevertheless, fears that the United States would ally with the Dominicans after the Civil War ended had a decisive role in Spain's decision to withdraw from Hispaniola in 1865.

Despite never recognizing its independence, Spain did recognize Confederate belligerency on June 17, 1861 following Britain and France. This allowed Confederate ships to use Spanish ports, and Cuba became a crucial base for Confederate blockade runners.

The war and the victory of the Union had an indirect role in the gradual abolition of slavery in the Spanish Caribbean.

=== Russia ===
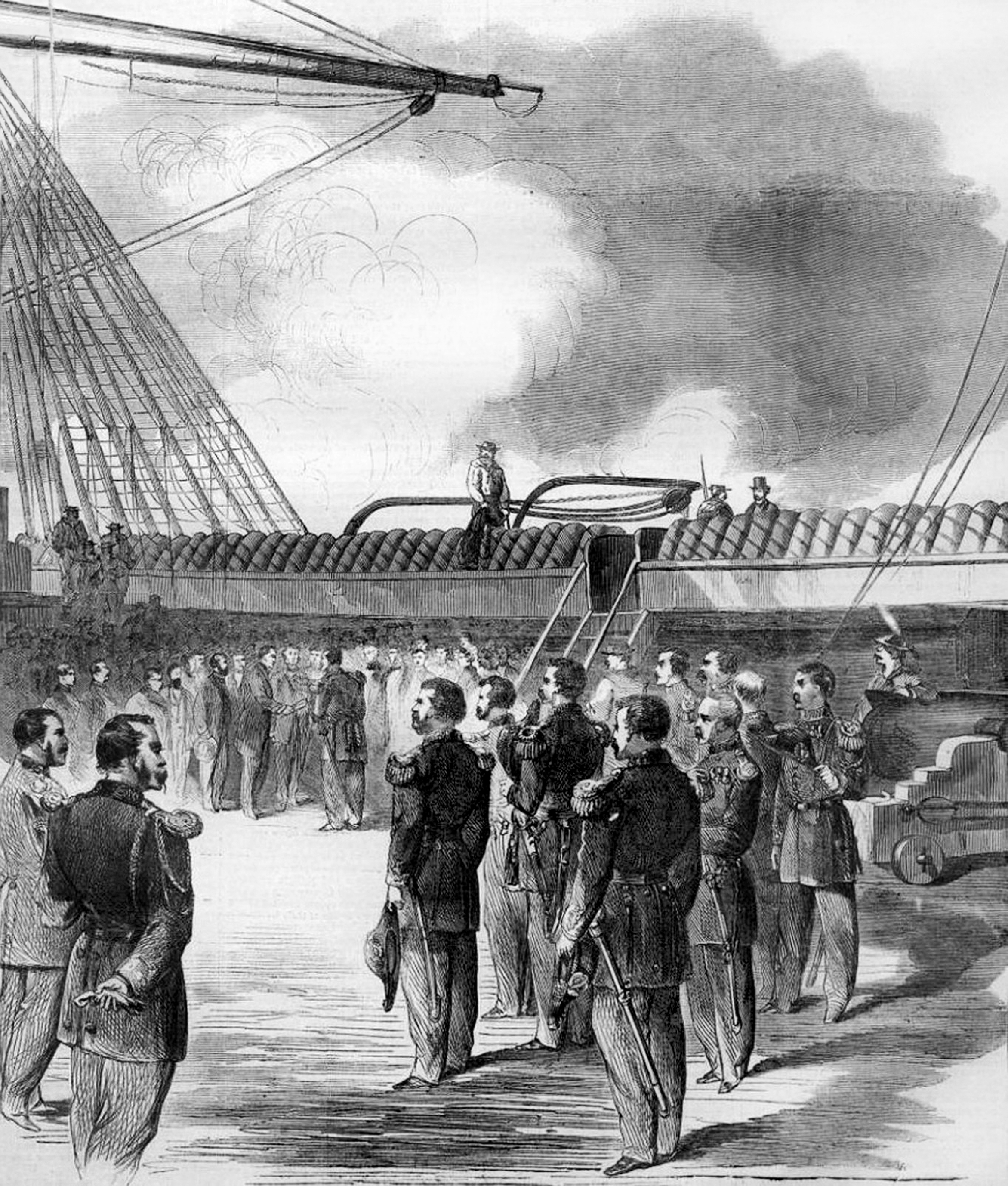
The American public visiting the frigate Alexander Nevsky after arrival in America, by Harper's Weekly

Alone among European powers, Russia offered rhetorical support for the Union, largely due to the view that the United States served as a counterbalance to the British Empire. In 1861, Tsar Alexander II issued the Edict of Emancipation, which abolished serfdom in Russia. He additionally called for the emancipation of slaves worldwide, including in the US South, Brazil, and Cuba.

During the winter of 1861–1862, the Imperial Russian Navy sent two fleets to American waters to avoid them getting trapped if a war broke out with Britain and France. Many Americans at the time viewed this as an intervention on behalf of the Union, though some historians deny this. The Atlantic squadron stayed in American waters for seven months, September 1863 to June 1864. The Russian ships were particularly appreciated in the thinly populated western states, where French-dominated Mexico was perceived as a larger threat than the Confederates.

In 1863, Russia suppressed a large-scale insurrection in Poland during the January Uprising. Many Polish resistance leaders fled the country, and Confederate agents tried but failed to recruit them to come to America and join the Confederacy.

In 1864, the Russian government rebuffed attempts by the Confederate agent Lucius Quintus Cincinnatus Lamar to meet with the Tsar in St. Peterburg.

Negotiations for the purchase of Alaska from Russia started during the Buchanan administration but were suspended during the war. They resumed in 1866 and concluded with the sale of the territory in 1867.

=== Netherlands ===
The Netherlands recognized Confederate belligerency. Due to the lack of Dutch territories in North America, however, this had little consequence. CSS Alabama was active against American trading ships in the Dutch East Indies and caught prizes off the coasts of Java and Borneo, which imperiled American trade with China.

Three diplomatic incidents happened during the war. In 1861, CSS Sumter was allowed in the bays of Willemstad, Curaçao and Paramaribo, Suriname, causing suspicion in the United States government. In May 1862, the Dutch consulate in New Orleans was raided by federal troops and the Dutch government protested. After a federal investigation, all confiscated money and items were returned to the consul. Finally, the Dutch vessel Geziena Hillegonda was seized and auctioned as a suspected blockade runner after entering American waters in December 1864. In all three cases, "the U.S. government manifested a desire to satisfy the aggrieved party and maintained cordial relations with the Dutch government."

The Lincoln administration opened negotiations with the Netherlands regarding African American migration to Surinam. Nothing came of the idea, and after 1864 it was abandoned.

=== Portugal ===
Portugal recognized Confederate belligerency. In 1865, the ironclad CSS Stonewall entered Lisbon harbor while being pursued by USS Niagara and USS Sacramento, which couldn't pierce Stonewall's armor. Stonewall was instructed to leave port without delay, and the Union ships to remain east of Belém Tower for 24 hours to ensure that they wouldn't fight while on Portuguese waters. Because Niagara moved while Stonewall was sailing away, the Tower's garrison fired nine shots on Niagara to dissuade it, hitting it twice but causing no casualties. The commander of Niagara, Thomas Craven, claimed that he wasn't trying to pursue Stonewall but merely repositioning the ship within the harbor. The Portuguese government apologized for the incident, giving the U.S. vessel a 21-gun salute and replacing the Tower's commander and governor.

== Latin America ==
=== Mexico ===
==== Benito Juárez ====
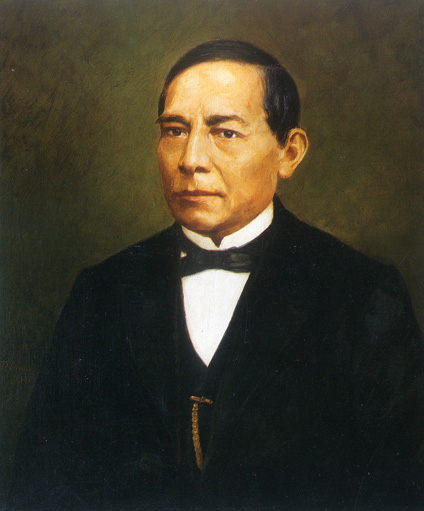
Benito Juárez

The American Civil War began just after the Reform War ended in Mexico with victory of the liberal president Benito Juárez over the Mexican Conservative Party, which included monarchist elements. Eight days after Juárez entered Mexico City, on January 19, 1861, the Mexican government sent ambassador Matías Romero to Springfield, Illinois where he met president-elect Lincoln with the declared aim of establishing an alliance with the United States as a "sister republic" in the Western Hemisphere.

In May, the Confederate government sent John Thomas Pickett to Mexico City to offer an alliance against what he called "land-grabbing Yankees", but he quickly realized Juárez's sympathies for the Union. Romero was negotiating a loan for $11 million with the U. S. government, and the Mexicans were aware that the main proponents of expansion before and after the Mexican-American War had been Southerners. Pickett himself was a veteran of the Lopez Expedition. Toombs instructed Pickett to argue that past calls for expansion had been product of the need to maintain the slave-free state balance, and that an independent South wouldn't have the same designs. However, their correspondence was intercepted by the Mexican government (and Pickett's own American postmaster, a Union spy), revealing that Pickett secretly supported expansion into Mexico. In October, Pickett feared that Juárez was going to authorize Union troops to land in Guaymas and attack Confederate Arizona from the south. The envoy approached Mexican conservatives and requested the Confederate government to occupy Monterrey, putting the Mexican government in alert. A timely barroom brawl between Pickett and John A. Bennett, an American businessman supportive of Juárez and a friend of foreign minister Manuel Zamacona, became a pretext to arrest Pickett and expel him from Mexico. For the duration of the war, Juárez refused to recognize the Confederate States as either an independent or belligerent power.

==== Santiago Vidaurri ====
The Confederate envoy to Monterrey, José Agustín Quintero, was more successful. Quintero met with the "Lord of the North", Santiago Vidaurri, who controlled the states of Nuevo León, Coahuila, and Tamaulipas. Though a liberal supporter in the Reform War, Vidaurri resisted Juárez's attempts to take control of the custom houses in Heroica Matamoros and other Rio Grande border towns, which had become very profitable after the Union blockaded the Southern ports and Mexico turned into the first source of foreign goods for the Confederacy. These included weapons, ammunition, gunpowder, metals, coffee, and sugar, which were exchanged for cotton. In August 1861 Vidaurri suggested to secede his territory and join the Confederacy, but Davis rejected the proposal for fear that this would alienate the European powers. Afterward Vidaurri kept the trade of lead, niter, and sulfur necessary to make ammunition, but refused to sell his stock of weapons in case of need to fight the Mexican government.

In June 1862, U. S. ambassador Thomas Corwin pressured Juárez to ban all trade of the northern Mexican states "with the Confederate States, under whatever circumstances". Vidaurri ignored this order, but in 1864 Juárez entered Monterrey and Vidaurri fled to Texas. However, only a few months later the French army occupied Nuevo León and forced Juárez to flee to Chihuahua, restoring Mexican trade with the Confederacy in the process.

==== Maximilian ====
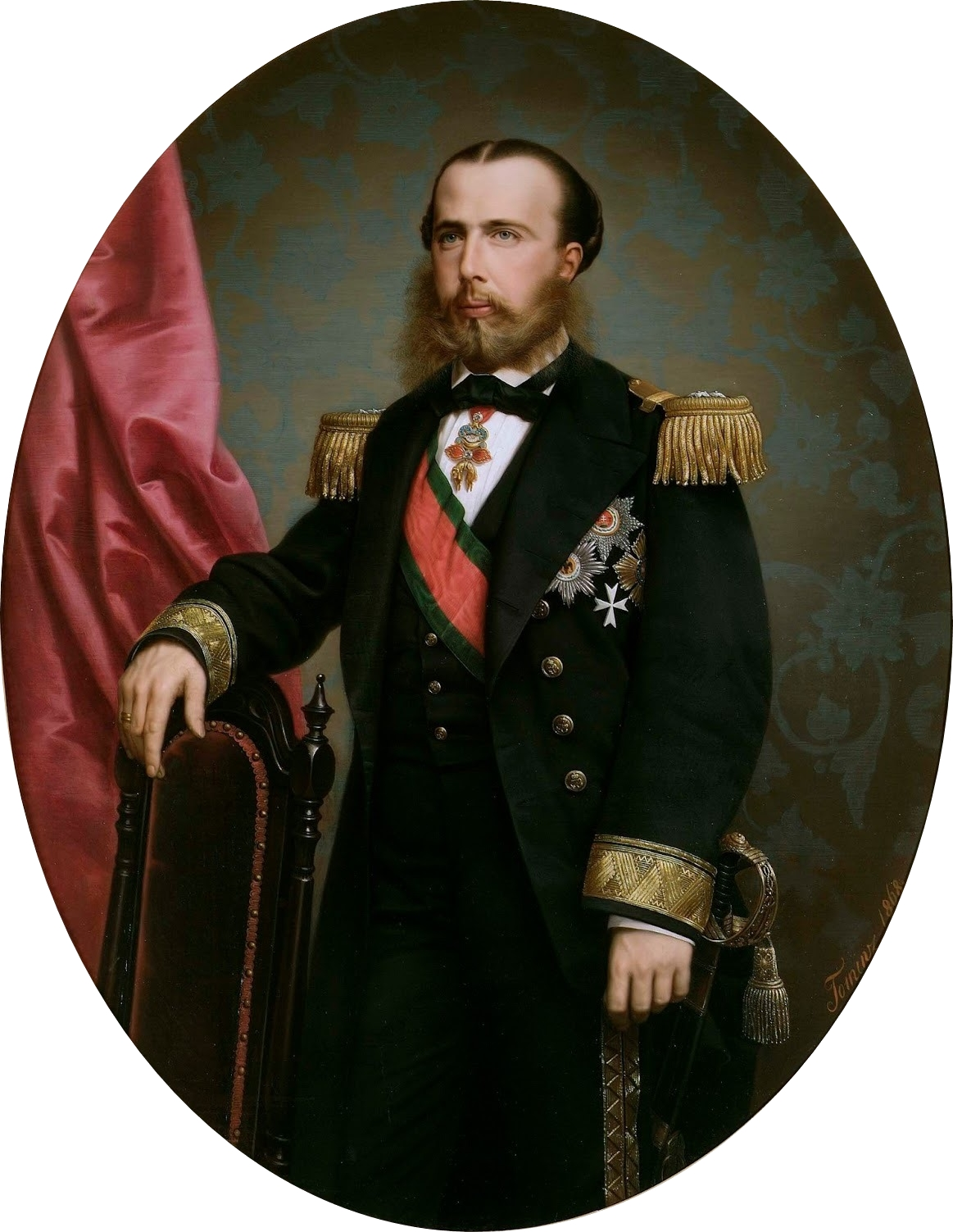
Maximilian I of Mexico

In October 1861, Spain, France, and the United Kingdom signed the Convention of London to force Mexico to resume payments of its foreign debt, which had been suspended by Juárez in July. The United States was invited to join the Convention but declined, arguing that Franco-Spanish claims (but not British) were unjustifiable or even outrageous. The U. S. government offered to cover the arrearages of the debt, but this was rejected by the allied powers. While remaining neutral in the intervention, the United States reserved their own right to intrude in Mexico if it was necessary to protect U. S. citizens and commercial interests, and placed ships on the Gulf of Mexico to secure trade routes and key ports.

On December 20, 1861, American Consul to Mazatlán, William L. Baker, set out, alongside several American Businessmen to inspect some silver mines in Guaymas. One of their party members chose to discontinue due to security concerns, however, Consul Baker and the others continued on. When none of the men arrived at their destination a posse was sent out looking for them. All party members including the Consul were discovered deceased and riddled with arrows. Contemporary sources at the time claim the unknown assailants were Apache, however ethnologists and historians suspect a likelier culprit to have been the native Yaqui people, indigenous to the region and engaged in open rebellion against the Juárez government, and many of whom fought for Maximilian.

After occupying Veracruz, the Spanish and British agreed to withdraw on April 9, 1862 in return for Mexico using 80% of the port's custom revenues to settle the debt. Realizing that the United States would not intervene while the Civil War was being fought, the French stayed and on April 16 invited Mexican conservatives to join them in establishing a new government. On June 10, 1863 the French occupied Mexico City and named a government Junta that proclaimed Mexico a constitutional monarchy and invited archduke Maximilian of Austria to become emperor of Mexico. With the new monarchy, the French planned to stop U. S. expansion and secure economic dominance over Mexico and the rest of Latin America. The United States and most Hispanic American countries protested the proclamation of the empire, and the leaders of El Salvador, Bolivia, and Chile requested U. S. intervention against the French. Jefferson Davis approved the monarchy in hopes that this would bring French recognition, but Napoleon III remained noncommittal without British support, and in 1864 the French emperor vetoed a mutual recognition of the Confederate States and the Second Mexican Empire to not drag France into a war with the United States.

Following the end of the American Civil War in 1865, the Juárez government secured a $30 million loan in New York City and raised another $16–18 million through the selling of war bonds in the United States for the purchase of war material. The United States provided weapons, supplies, hospital care, and volunteers to the republicans. At the same time, Seward changed his stance from thinly veiled sympathy for Juárez to open threat of war to induce a French withdrawal, and an army commanded by Philip Sheridan was stationed directly across the Rio Grande in Texas.

In January 1866, African American troops from Clarksville, Texas raided Bagdad, Tamaulipas and fired on French vessels. After French protest, the Andrew Johnson administration removed Godfrey Weitzel as commander of Clarksville and disciplined the soldiers involved. However, they also allowed Sheridan to give 30,000 rifles of the Baton Rouge Arsenal in Louisiana to the Mexican republicans.

The French withdrew completely from Mexico on March 12, 1867 and Maximilian was captured by republican forces on May 14. Juárez ignored requests of clemency by the United States and other countries, and Maximilian was executed by firing squad on June 19. In 1868, Seward stated that "The Monroe Doctrine, which eight years ago was merely a theory, is now an irreversible fact."

Before French withdrawal, a few hundred ex-Confederates settled the New Virginia Colony in central Mexico, having been invited and offered land grants by Maximilian. The settlers could not bring slaves, as slavery was illegal in Mexico. The vast majority returned to the United States after Juárez's victory, except for a few that went to Brazil, Venezuela, and Jamaica.

=== Brazil ===
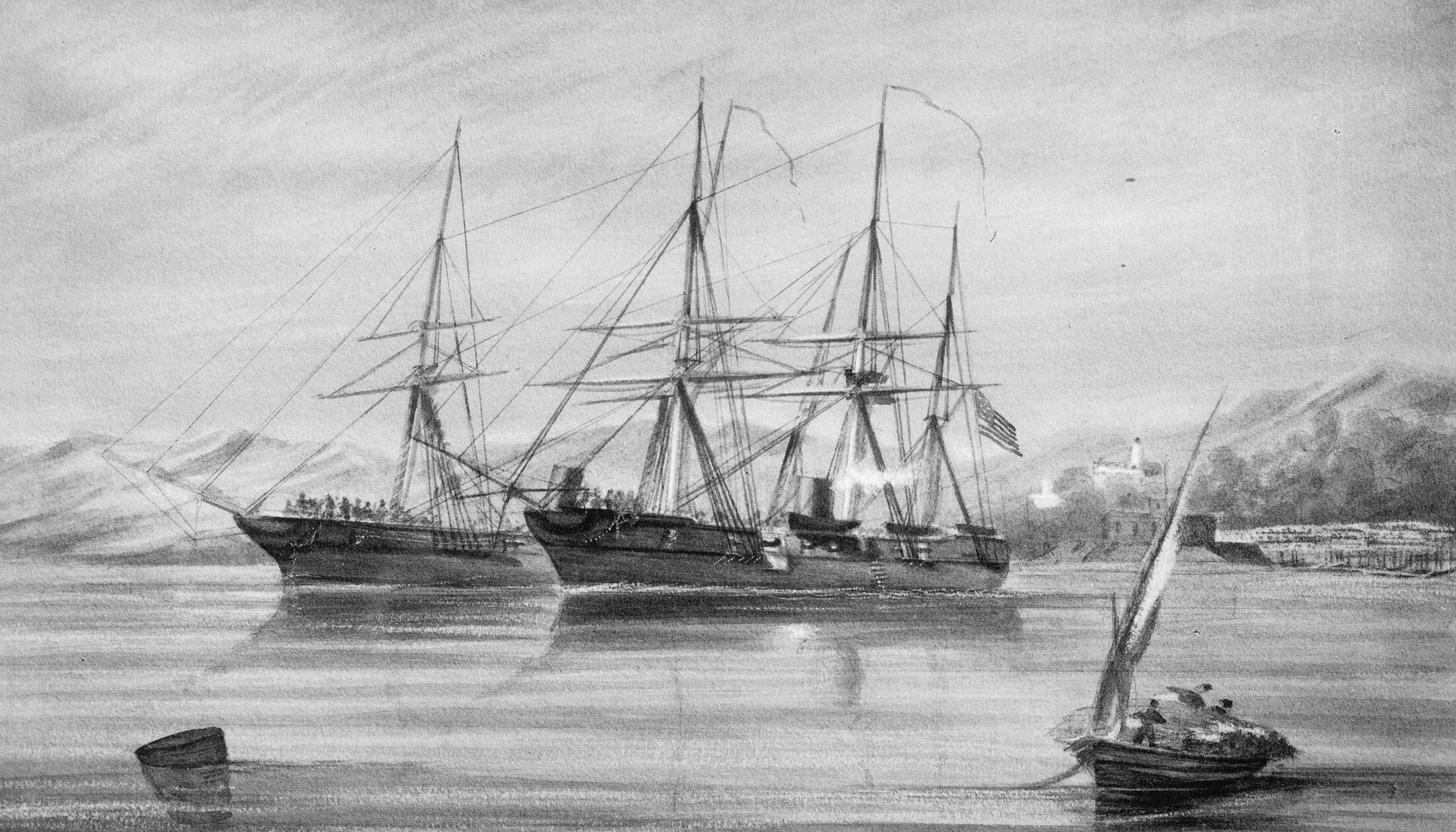
Cutting of CSS Florida by USS Wachusett, the Bahia Incident

Though nominally neutral, the Empire of Brazil has been called an unofficial ally of the Confederacy. Uniquely among New World nations, Brazil recognized Confederate belligerency and refused diplomatic demands to allow the Union's removal of CSS Sumter from Maranhão on September 6, 1861. On September 19, 1862, William R. Williams, America Consul to Para, Brazil took ill with Yellow Fever. He survived six days with the disease before passing on September 25, 1862 at the age of 24. He had been a political appointee to the role and had married the daughter of a Brazilian lawyer while in country. In 1863 the U.S. ambassador to Brazil, James Watson Webb, exchanged correspondence with the Brazilian foreign minister Marquis of Abrantes about steamers CSS Alabama and CSS Georgia, that had been receiving provisions and repairs in Pernambuco and Bahia. Webb described this situation as "a gross breach of neutrality" on Brazil's part, because access to Brazilian ports allowed the Confederates to raid Union vessels in the South Atlantic.

The Bahia incident happened on the early morning of October 7, 1864 when USS Wachusett captured CSS Florida while both ships were in the harbor for repairs, and after both the Imperial Brazilian Navy and the U.S. consul had warned captain Napoleon Collins not to attack Florida while in Brazilian waters. Pressured by the Brazilian government, the US Navy court-martialed Collins and agreed to return Florida to the Confederacy. However, Collins's sentence was never carried out, and Florida sunk off the coast of Virginia after a suspicious November 28 collision with the United States Army Transport Alliance.

After the war, thousands of ex-Confederates emigrated to Brazil on the invitation of Pedro II and subsidized by the Brazilian government. Though slavery was legal in Brazil, the immigrants were not allowed to bring slaves because their importation from other countries had been banned in 1831.

=== Haiti ===
Despite sharing trade and informal relations since independence, the United States refused to recognize Haiti as a country for most of the 19th century. The main reason was Southern fears that Haiti would become an example and rallying point for a slave rebellion, as Haiti had originated in one, as well as a refusal to recognize the dignity of any black person as an ambassador.

President Fabre Geffrard invited African Americans to immigrate in 1858, wishing to incorporate American developments in agriculture. In 1861, Frederick Douglass visited the country and spoke favorably of it as a destination for freedmen, but the beginning of the war precluded this. Although thousands had moved successfully to Haiti earlier in the century, the roughly one thousand who moved in this time found conditions much worse than expected, and after suffering from smallpox and yellow fever many returned to the United States.

Following the departure of most Southerners from the House of Representatives, the United States recognized Haiti on 5 June 1862. Lincoln hoped that relations with Haiti would entice African Americans to move there, and that this would reduce race tensions in the postwar United States. The first appointed Commissioner and Consul General was Benjamin F. Whidden. Trade increased after recognition, and in 1864 the port of Gonaïves alone shipped over 250,000 pounds of cotton to the United States.

Cap-Haïtien was the main base of the West India Squadron, a Union flotilla created in September 1862 to hunt Confederate commerce raiders, under command of Charles Wilkes. In May 1865, US Marines landed in Cap-Haïtien to protect the American consulate after revolts against Geffrard began across Haiti.

== Asia and the Pacific ==
=== Hawaii ===
King Kamehameha IV declared Hawaii's neutrality on August 26, 1861. However, many Native Hawaiians and Hawaii-born Americans (mainly descendants of American missionaries), abroad and in the islands, enlisted in the military regiments of various states in the Union and the Confederacy. Many Hawaiians sympathized with the Union because of Hawaii's ties to New England through its missionaries and whaling industries, and the opposition of many to the institution of slavery, which the Constitution of 1852 had officially outlawed.

=== Japan ===
The Tokugawa Shogunate did not participate in the American Civil War. American representation in Japan remained loyal to the Union, and the Confederacy never tried to establish relations with the country. However, the war indirectly affected the fledging relations between Japan, the United States, and European countries.

==== European rivalry ====
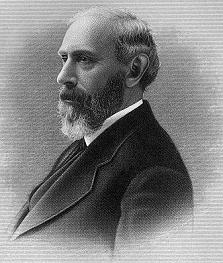
Robert H. Pruyn around 1865

According to historian George M. Brooke, the United States was set to play a significant role in the creation of the Imperial Japanese Navy, but the outbreak of the Civil War prevented it, and the Japanese turned to the British Royal Navy for assistance instead. American prestige in Japan, high from the 1853 Perry Expedition and the early arrival of American missionaries, declined in 1862–1863 due to the war straining communications, lack of American military presence in Japan, and Anglo-French threats to recognize the Confederacy, which stoke tensions between Americans and Europeans and were perceived as a weakness by the Japanese. The American consul in Kanagawa, Colonel Fisher, blamed the diplomacy of the French Jesuit Mermet de Cachon the most, perceiving the British as a lesser threat represented only by their global naval and military power. In contrast, the American minister to Japan Robert H. Pruyn told British Captain John Moresby that "we hate England", and "I only hope... to see the day when we shall have settled with the South, and can take England by the throat for all the insults and sneers she has heaped on us", even though the American legations were dependent on British protection against increasing anti-foreign sentiment in Japan, and the British agreed to transport Pruyn between Yokohama and Edo free of charge. The consul in Hakodate, E.E. Rice, asked for a letter of marque to turn his ship The One into a privateer if war with Britain and France broke out.

==== Shimonoseki conflict ====
In parallel, the conflict between the aperturist Shogun Tokugawa Iemochi and the isolationist Sonnō jōi movement reached pre-bellic status by early 1863. In February, the Shogun's minister of foreign affairs told Pruyn that Tokugawa feared civil war; the daimyo of Satsuma and Chōshū were most hostile to foreigners and influencing Emperor Kōmei. When asked about the U.S.'s reaction to war in Japan, Pruyn said that they would support the Shogun in any way they could, and that foreign powers would be justified to act against the hostile daimyo in self-defense. Soon after, the emperor summoned the Shogun to Kyoto for the first time since 1634, where he remained for months, while attacks against foreigners multiplied. On May 25, the American legation in Edo was destroyed by fire. The cause was not identified but the Shogun's representative advised Pruyn to move to Yokohama for his own safety.

Pruyn's request of naval protection from Washington went unheeded, but he got an answer from USS Wyoming, which had been sent to Asia to pursue CSS Alabama and was fortuitously in Hong Kong. On June 24, the Shogun, on the order of the emperor, formally demanded all foreigners to leave Japan. However, the Shogun himself opposed the order, and his representative told Pruyn to ignore it, reassuring him that the Shogun would protect the foreign legations until it was rescinded. Nevertheless, Pruyn replied that the order was a breach of the 1858 Treaty of Amity and Commerce and tantamount to a declaration of war.

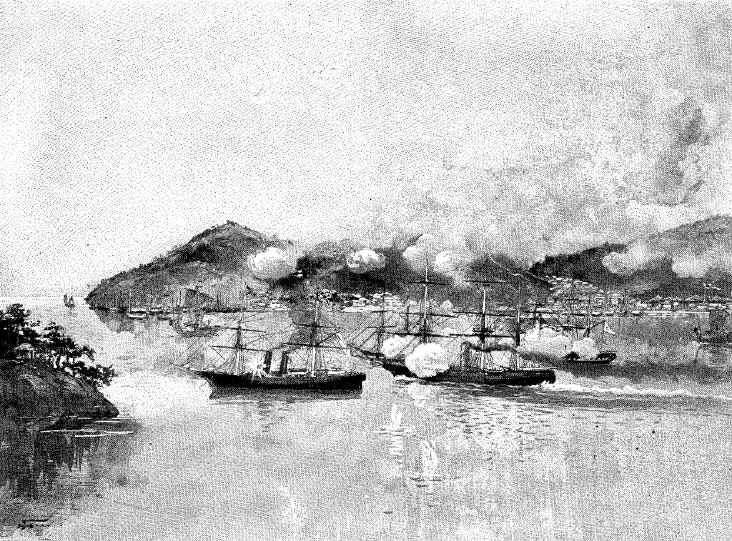
Battle of Shimonoseki Straits

Two days later, Chōshū forces closed the Shimonoseki Straits to foreign shipping and attacked the American merchant S.S. Pembroke. Pruyn demanded "satisfaction" from the Shogun, saying the incident "if justified by the government, constituted war; if disavowed, were acts of piracy." Without waiting for approval from Washington, the Wyoming sailed to Shimonoseki and on 16 July engaged the daimyo's three ships while under fire from coastal artillery, sinking two and damaging the other, along with one battery. Pruyn reiterated that "the attack on the Pembroke was an act of piracy, which required immediate punishment." In America, the attack was approved by Congress, by Abraham Lincoln in his 1863 Annual Message to Congress (today the State of the Union address), Secretaries of State Seward and of the Navy Gideon Welles, as a vindication of the honor of the American flag and the "enlightened and liberal policy" of the Shogun against "the perverse opposition of the hereditary aristocracy of the Empire". Only decades later, historian Tyler Dennett would rebuke the incident as "un-American when judged by the entire American record in Asia."

The action of the Wyoming was immediately dwarfed by the French burning of Shimonoseki on July 24 and by the British bombardment of Kagoshima in August, both in response to Japanese attacks against them. One year later, a fleet of British, French, and Dutch warships, accompanied by one American man-of-war as a sign of support, destroyed Chōshū's military capability at Shimonoseki and forced the daimyo to capitulate. The Shogun was satisfied because, although the foreigners had resorted to violence to defend the treaty rights, it had been against Chōshū, an enemy of the Shogunate, and tacitly in support of the Shogun's own policy. The Japanese accepted the indemnity demanded by the Pembroke (considered excessive even by Pruyn) and paid $12,000 on September 5, 1864.

British and French Marines also occupied Yokohama between 1863 and 1875, further decreasing American influence. To counter this, Fisher requested unsuccessfully that a fleet and marine garrison be stationed at Yokohama, on a par with those maintained by the French and British.

=== China ===
British shipyards building commerce raiders for the Confederate States Navy often disguised them as being built for the Qing dynasty, which was acquiring Western vessels for the war against the Taiping Rebellion. In 1862 American Filibuster and Commander of the Ever Victorious Army, Frederick Townsend Ward was killed in the Battle of Cixi. He was replaced, against his dictated will, by Franco-American Henri Andres Burgevine. By 1864, Burgevine had defected from the Qing and joined the ranks of the rebels. Burgenvine was captured that same year and deported, but was able to escape and return, only to be captured and deported again. This time however, while on en route to Singapore, his ship sunk, killing him and all of his Qing escort. Some claim it was on the orders of Li Hongzhang.

In the treaty ports, news and rumors about the Trent affair and Confederate raiders heightened tensions between British and American residents, with some claiming willingness to raid British ships under Taiping banners if a war broke out between the two countries. However relations eventually relaxed and the Taiping were seen as the common threat with their advance on Shanghai. When USS Wyoming arrived in Hong Kong, it was the American community itself that petitioned the British governor, Hercules Robinson to deny entry to the ship on the basis of neutrality, but Robinson ruled that the actual neutral course of action was to allow the ship in.

Confederate raiding, coupled with the Taiping takeover of the Yangtze Valley (the main area of American trade in China), shot up insurance prices for American shipping to the point that Americans resorted to sailing almost completely under the convenience flags of Portugal, Prussia, and Peru.

In April 1864, William Irvin, the American Consul to Amoy, China was assisting with the sick during a cholera outbreak in the international quarter of the city. He was struck ill and died of the disease on October 25, 1864.

=== Siam ===
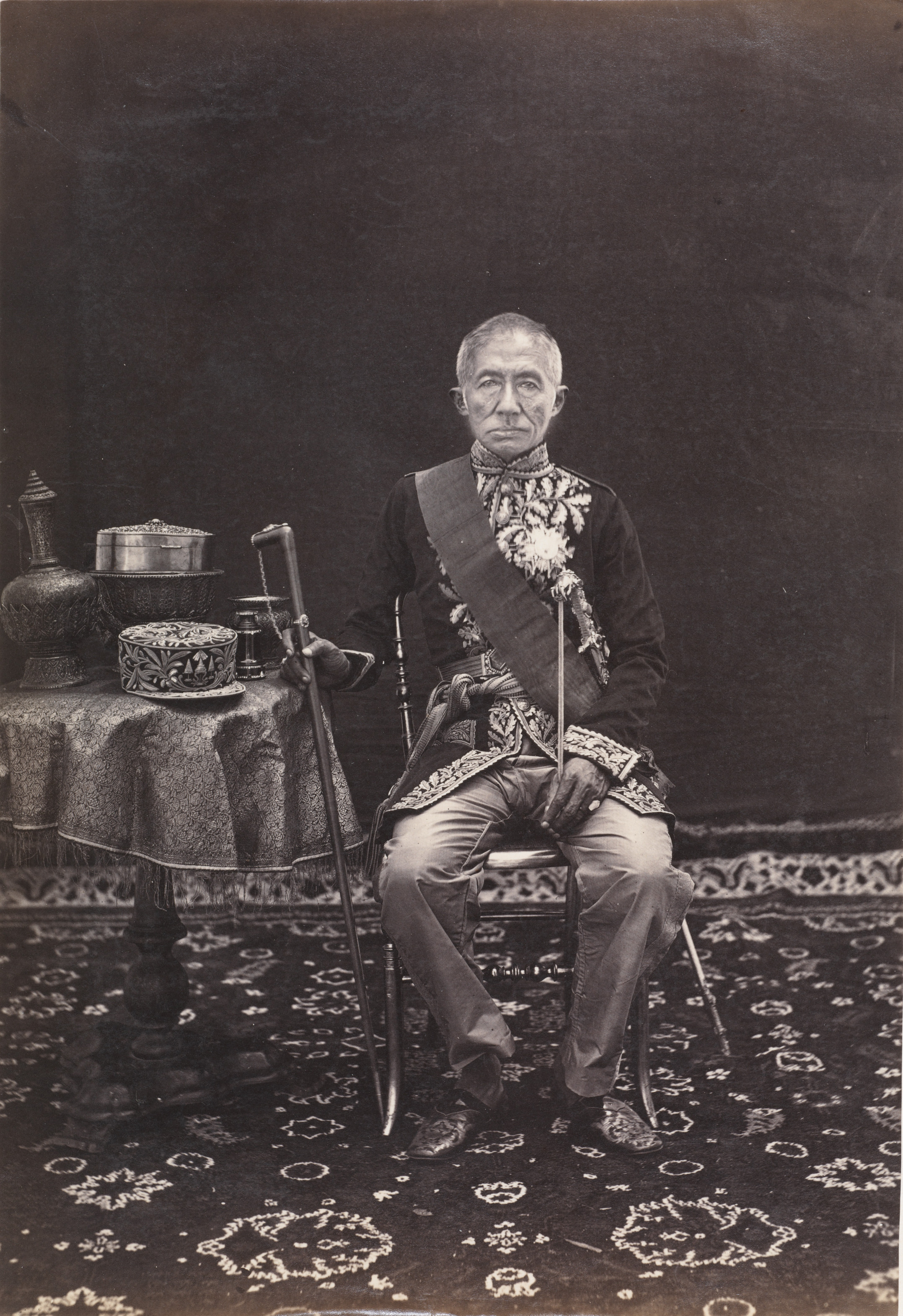
Mongkut in 1865

On February 14, 1861 (during the last month of Buchanan's presidency), King Mongkut of Siam wrote a letter to Buchanan expressing his desire for friendly relations with the country. The letter was accompanied by a photograph of Mongkut with one of his daughters, a sword, and two elephant tusks as diplomatic gifts. In the text, Mongkut mentioned that he had been informed of the introduction of the non-native dromedary camel as a beast of burden used by the United States Camel Corps, and said he was willing to cooperate if the United States wished to do the same with the Asian elephant. Per the proposal, the United States would provide a vessel capable of transporting elephants across the ocean, and Siam would forward one or two pairs of young elephants at a time, which would be released in American forests, allowed to multiply, and subsequently captured to haul cargo in forested areas without roads.

Elephants are not true domestic animals because they couldn't be bred in captivity until recently, and the nations of southern Asia were historically dependent on the capture and trade of wild-born elephants for use as work animals. The capture and sale of live elephants to other countries had been a royal monopoly in Siam for centuries before Mongkut's offer was made.

Though the letter was given to the American Consul in Siam, no ship was allocated to deliver it directly to Washington, and it was expected to be substantially delayed as it changed ships from port to port. Lincoln wrote a reply on February 3, 1862, accepting the gifts on behalf of the American people but politely declining the elephants on the grounds that the geography of the United States was unfavorable for their multiplication, and the steam engine was sufficient to cover its transportation needs. This "humorous event" has been misrepresented in later pop culture as Mongkut offering trained war elephants to be deployed in the American Civil War. The Camel Corps that prompted Mongkut's offer was abandoned during the war, partly because its main proponent had been Jefferson Davis during his time as Secretary of War in the Pierce administration.

=== Đại Nam (Vietnam) ===
At the time of the American Civil War, Vietnam was under the Nguyễn dynasty and referring to itself as Đại Nam. The country at the time was in the grips of a colonial conflict known as the Cochinchina campaign. Initially started as a punitive expedition in retaliation against the execution of two Jesuit Catholic Priests of Spanish origin, the scope grew with the Imperial hunger of Napoleon III, who involved himself alongside his Catholic brethren. The United States saw minor involvement in the conflict when on July 31, 1861 they bombarded the city of Qui Nhơn. The day before word had reached the American East India Squadron, based in Hong Kong, that an entire boat's worth of sailors had gone missing in Qui Nhơn's harbor. The ship, the American flagged Myrtle, had dispatched the boat to shore and hadn't heard from them since and were growing worried. USS Saginaw, then en route to the West Gulf Blockading Squadron was rerouted to assist in the search.

Upon reaching the harbor, the Vietnamese garrison, likely mistaking the vessel as a hostile Spanish or French vessel shot a round from the fort at Saginaw with it exploding near the bow. The surprised Americans quickly ran up the white flag of truce to indicate their peaceful intentions, but they were ignored and another shot was fired, followed immediately by a third. Under sail at the time, the crew coaxed as much steam as possible from her cooled engines and retreated to 900 yards away before returning fire with her 32 pound gun for about 20 minutes. After 20 minutes had elapsed, as secondary explosion was observed, estimated to be either the magazine or cannon itself exploding and killing the occupants of the fort. After the explosion, no evidence of life was spotted from the fort, though the crew of the Saginaw continued their bombardment for an additional half an hour until the fort was entirely in ruins.

No damage was indicated to Saginaw and no Americans were injured or killed. The ship then returned to Hong Kong to report their findings. The missing crew of the Myrtle was never found and suspected to have been killed. The USS Saginaw went on to serve with distinction all over the west coast for the remainder of the war.

== African ==
=== Morocco ===
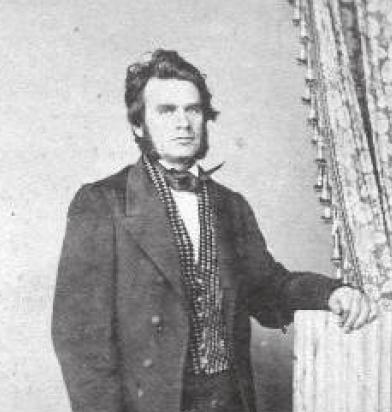
James DeLong, US consul in Tangier

A crisis comparable to the Trent Affair occurred on February 19, 1862 when the U.S. consul in Tangier, James DeLong, arrested two Southerners, Henry Myers and Thomas Tate Tunstall, after they arrived at the city on the French ship Villa de Malaga. DeLong was assisted by Moroccan guards commanded by the niyaba (foreign minister), Mohammed Bargach. Myers was a crewman of CSS Sumter and was traveling back to Cádiz, Spain, where the Sumter had been expelled from in January, to buy coal after the ship was not allowed to buy any in Gibraltar due to the intervention of U.S. consul Horatio Sprague. Tunstall had been U.S. consul in Cádiz until 1861, when he was replaced because of his sympathies for the Confederacy. The two were held in chains at the American Legation while a crowd of 200 to 400 European residents gathered outside to demand their release. DeLong justified his actions because the American-Moroccan Treaty of 1836 had given the U.S. "all the privileges which the Consuls of any other Nation enjoy", and the Anglo-Moroccan Treaty of 1856 had subsequently allowed the British consul to request Moroccan soldiers to help arrest British subjects on Moroccan soil. On February 26, forty US Marines took the prisoners aboard USS Ino and they were imprisoned at Fort Warren, Massachusetts.

On March 1, DeLong accused the European consuls of stirring up anti-American sentiment and failing to act against an armed mob that had threatened his life and the American Legation. Europeans replied that it was a spontaneous, peaceful demonstration, and claimed either that their own nationals had not taken part in the incident, or that they had been removed by their consular authorities. The commander of the Ino, J. P. Creesy, did not mention the crowd having weapons or threatening violence in his description of the incident, only that they cried "freedom" in Spanish (the second language of Tangier) and called Tunstall by his name.

The most critical country was France, whose foreign minister Thouvenel complained to the Lincoln administration. He questioned the legality of the arrests, argued that the prisoners were entitled to French protection due to arriving on a French vessel, and thought that Tunstall deserved better treatment due to his status as a former diplomat, legally codified or not. Seward rejected the French points, arguing that Myers and Tunstall lost French protection when they left the ship; the arrests respected the laws of Morocco, where Confederate belligerency was not recognized and they were only U.S. citizens; and European citizens had no right to interfere in the arrests in any case. Notwithstanding the defense of the consul's actions, Lincoln replaced DeLong with Jesse McMath just a few weeks later, and the prisoners were released later in the year. By then, captain Raphael Semmes and most crew had abandoned the Sumter in Gibraltar and taken possession of the new CSS Alabama in England.

The Makhzen pledged support for the Union in a royal decree. A brother of sultan Muhammad IV of Morocco, Moulay al-'Abbas, said that he wished the United States "victory (victorious as they always are) over those who have rebelled against them". In September 1863, another decree banned all Confederate ships and agents from Moroccan ports, telling the governors of the coastal cities: "If any vessel of the so-called Confederate States of America enters your port, it shall not be received, but you must order it away at once, as they are not allowed entrance, because we do not know them and they have no consul by whom they may be known to us." In appreciation, Lincoln said that he would reconsider renegotiating the unequal treaty with Morocco for another more favorable to the country.

==== Bombardment of Mogador ====
As a result of the 1863 La Patrie Affair, the CSS Georgia went into hiding. Ironically, in the Port of Cherbourg. Georgia was due to link up with the CSS Rappahannock who was now months overdue and being held up under bureaucratic lock and key by the French Authorities in the Calais. Guarded day and night by a gendarme on each of her mooring bollards. Which is where she would remain until the end of the war. In Cherbourg, the French authorities became restive with the raider's presence, as Union flagged raider hunters like the USS Kearsarge and USS Wachusett remained ever vigilant for ships like the elusive Florida and deadly Alabama, and lurked just outside the port.

Then just a few short weeks after entering the port, Georgia put out to sea again, this time headed towards North Africa, and, hopefully, better and safer hunting grounds. It was off the coast of Mogador, Morocco, that Georgia ran into trouble, her belly had become laden with sea life, and she needed to be scraped badly. So, Captain Maury sent a party to shore to request permission to beach his stricken vessel for repairs. However, so sooner had the shore party landed when a mass of Moroccans armed with long guns came upon them and surrounded them shouting in Arabic. The Confederacy was banned from Moroccan ports, and these men knew exactly who and what the Georgia was. Heading back to Georgia, Captain Maury flew into a rage at the insolence of the local populace and ordered a salvo from the Georgia's ten-pound Whitworth gun followed by a steady bombardment with her pivot guns. Retreating into the hills surrounding beach immediately following the first shot, not a single Moroccan was reported injured in the incident and the Confederacy's only foreign action during the entire war ended in strategic failure by the Confederates.

Following repeated strategic failures and an increasing sense of the Confederacy's looming doom, Maury set sail for Liverpool and sold Georgia into the mail service on the Liverpool to Cabo Verde line.

=== Liberia ===
Founded by the American Colonization Society, Liberia had declared independence in 1847 and asked repeatedly to establish foreign relations with the United States. President James K. Polk denied the request, and all his successors before the war declined to respond. As in Haiti's case, American high society was concerned about the consequences of giving their due treatment to a black ambassador and his family. Liberia was finally recognized in 1862, after most Southerners had left the House of Representatives.

== Other countries ==
=== Belgium ===
Belgium recognized Confederate belligerency in 1861. Ambrose Dudley Mann's later mission to Belgium has also been called "successful" when compared to other Confederate diplomatic endeavors. Mann arrived in 1862 and cultivated a close relationship with the royal court of king Leopold I, uncle of queen Victoria of the United Kingdom and advisor of her and Napoleon III on foreign policy. On January 5, 1863 Mann presented formal demands of recognition to the government of Charles Rogier, and Leopold I encouraged the British and French monarchs to intervene in the war and in this way protect the cotton operatives in both countries. However, the modest economic and military power of Belgium moderated her influence in other countries.

Mann's Union counterpart, Henry Sanford, was not as effective in the country as he was in other European capitals where he organized and financed clandestine operations for the U.S. government.

=== Italian states ===
==== Italy ====
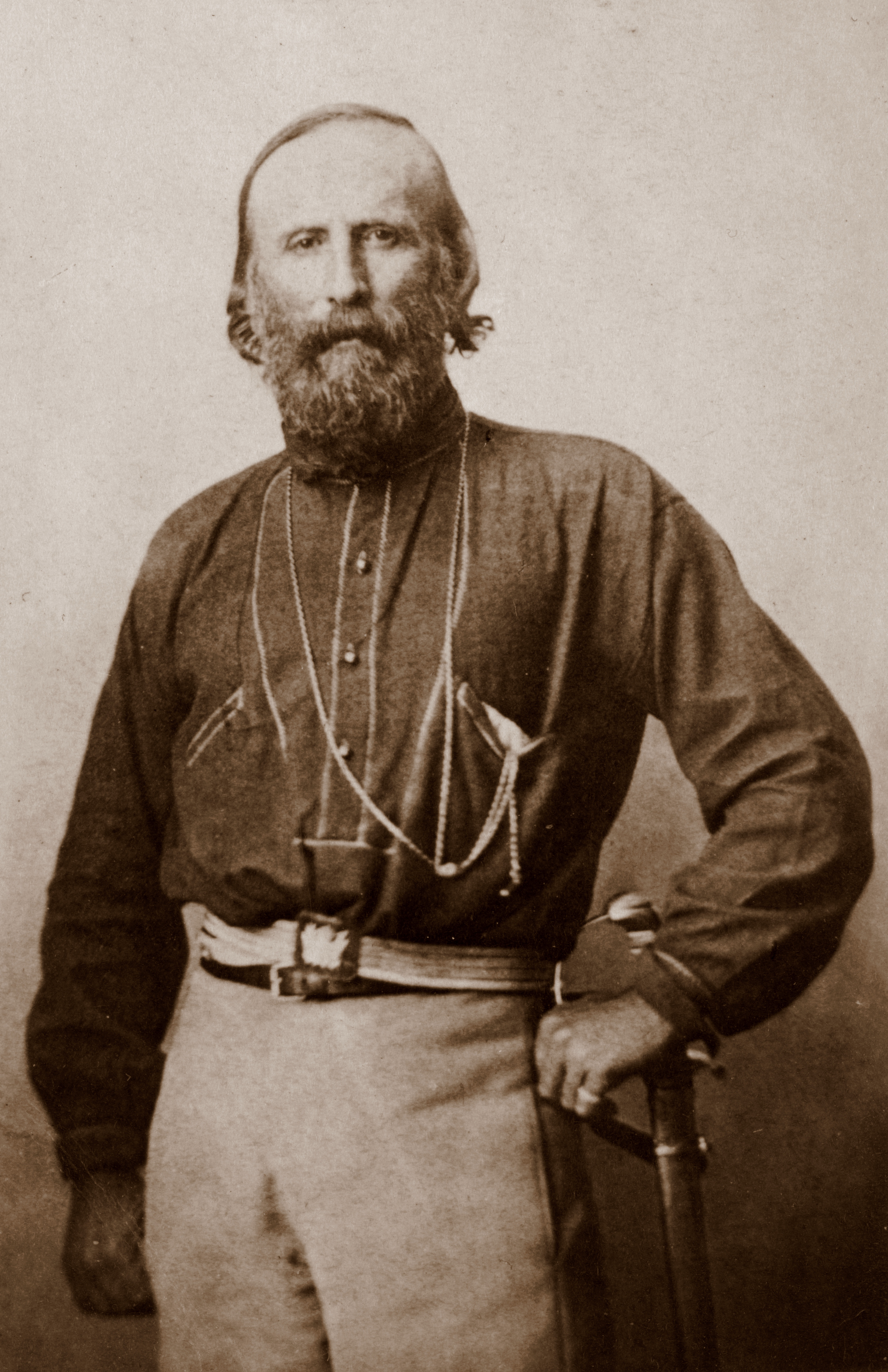
Giuseppe Garibaldi in 1861

The Kingdom of Italy was proclaimed one month before the beginning of the American Civil War, on March 17, 1861, following the conquest of the Kingdom of the Two Sicilies by Giuseppe Garibaldi's Expedition of the Thousand. On July 27, six days after the rout of the Union army at the First Battle of Bull Run, Seward accepted a suggestion of James W. Quiggle, consul to Antwerp, to recruit the popular Garibaldi, and instructed minister Sanford to travel to Turin.

Betraying the secrecy of Sanford's mission, Quiggle wrote to Garibaldi and implied that the Italian would receive supreme command of the Union Army. This idea was confirmed to Garibaldi by Sanford's messenger, Joseph Artomi, before Sanford arrived in Italy and without his knowledge or approval. In reality, Lincoln and Seward only wanted Garibaldi to assume command of the army defending Washington, D.C. from a possible Confederate attack. King Victor Emmanuel II was at the time trying to keep Garibaldi out of government, but he was reluctant to let him leave, because he wanted Garibaldi ready for a possible campaign against French-occupied Rome or Austrian-held Venice. Others including Enrico Cialdini wanted Garibaldi to fight the brigandage in Southern Italy. The king consented to Garibaldi leaving the country after receiving a direct appeal from him. In early September, Garibaldi met with Sanford twice. He demanded supreme command because he would be of little use otherwise, and the authority to abolish slavery when the "time seemed ripe", lest the war "appear like a civil war in which the world at large could have little interest or sympathy". Sanford replied that not even Lincoln had the authority to grant such powers, ending the negotiations. In his final report to Seward, Sanford wrote that Garibaldi "could do nothing co-operatively – never has – and my own conviction, while impressed with his many great qualities, is he never can. What he does he must do by himself and in his own way." Some historians believe that Garibaldi was never actually interested in going to the United States and only took advantage of the Union's offer to pressure Victor Emmanuel II into conquering Rome.

The affair became a diplomatic embarrassment for the United States. British and French journalists reproduced a rumor that Garibaldi had rejected an offer of supreme command, ridiculing it as a "confession of failure" and "military incompetence" on the part of the Union. The claim that Garibaldi had been offered supreme command was denied by Sanford in London and by William Dayton in Paris.

==== Papal States ====
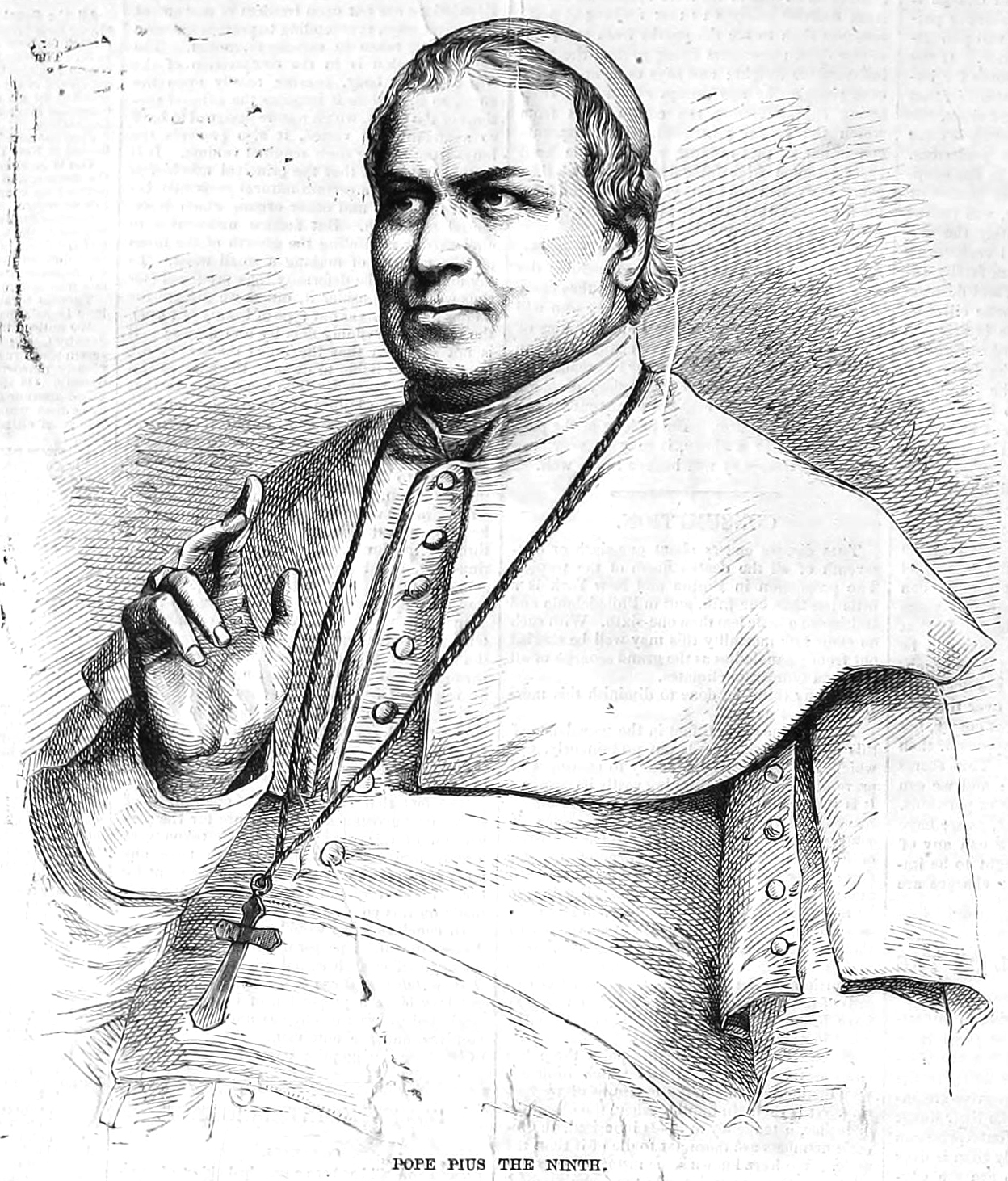
Pius IX in 1867

On October 18, 1862 pope Pius IX wrote to the archbishops of New York, John Hughes, and New Orleans, Jean-Marie Odin, "to use every effort to bring about a peaceful solution of the difficulties between the states". Hughes had earlier used his influence to win Irish-American support for the Union, while Odin had supported the Confederacy.

Father John B. Bannon, a Catholic chaplain in the Confederate army, persuaded Davis to seek recognition from the Papal States as a way to regain the moral high ground after the Emancipation Proclamation. It was hoped that papal recognition might entice some minor European Catholic nation to follow, and that this would cascade into recognition by France and later Britain. A. Dudley Mann met the pope in December 1863 and received a letter addressed to the "Honorable President of the Confederate States of America," which Mann claimed equivalent to diplomatic recognition. However, Judah Benjamin told Mann that it was "a mere inferential recognition, unconnected with political action or the regular establishment of diplomatic relations".

On July 4, 1864 Pius IX received Bannon and the archbishop of Charleston Patrick Neeson Lynch, officially not as foreign emissaries but as members of the clergy. The pope said that it was "clear" that North and South were "different nations", but declined to recognize the Confederate government, and said he would not speak in support of slavery if he was called to mediate in the war. He thought that the North's emancipation in a single act was too drastic, but recommended the South to improve the conditions of slaves and work towards gradual emancipation.

While in Rome, Lynch wrote the pamphlet "Letter on domestic slavery in the Confederate States of America", intended to justify Southern slavery for a European secular audience with scientific arguments, not biblical or theological. First published in Italian, the pamphlet was translated to German and French, but not English.

==== San Marino ====
On March 29, 1861 the Captains Regent of San Marino offered Abraham Lincoln honorary Sammarinese citizenship. The move was intended to affirm San Marino's independence and republican government by allying it to a larger republic, in a time when the annexation of San Marino by the Kingdom of Italy appeared imminent. Garibaldi was granted the same honor in April. Lincoln accepted on May 7, stating in his reply that San Marino was living proof of the endurance and security of republican government, now put into question by foreign powers because of the Civil War. Joseph Addison and John Adams had described San Marino in the same terms earlier.

=== German states ===
==== Austria ====
The Austrian Empire pursued amicable relations with the Union throughout the American Civil War. Reminded of the 1848 Revolutions, Austria opposed revolutionary efforts on principle, which drove them away from the Confederacy. Foreign minister Bernhard von Rechberg stated three days after the outbreak of the war that "Austria hoped to see the United States reunited since she was not inclined to recognize de facto Governments anywhere." Assuming the war would end shortly, Austria hoped that through a friendly relationship with the Union, the United States would later help them protect their maritime neutral trading rights, which they feared would be violated in the case of a European war. In 1864, Napoleon III installed Archduke Maximilian, brother to the Austrian emperor Francis Joseph I, as emperor of French-controlled Mexico. Austria made efforts to separate itself from the French venture, and when Maximilian assumed the throne he was forced to renounce his claim to the Austrian crown. These actions satisfied Union diplomats, allowing the United States and Austria to maintain friendly relations through the close of the Civil War.

==== Prussia ====
Prussia recognized Confederate belligerency, but because of the lack of Prussian overseas territories, this meant little. Several members of the Prussian military served as officers and enlisted men in both armies, just as had numerous men who had previously emigrated to the United States. Military observers were also sent to North America to observe the tactics of both armies, which were later studied by future military leaders of Prussia and the later unified German Empire.

==== Other German states ====
The free cities of Bremen and Hamburg recognized Confederate belligerency.

=== Ottoman Empire ===
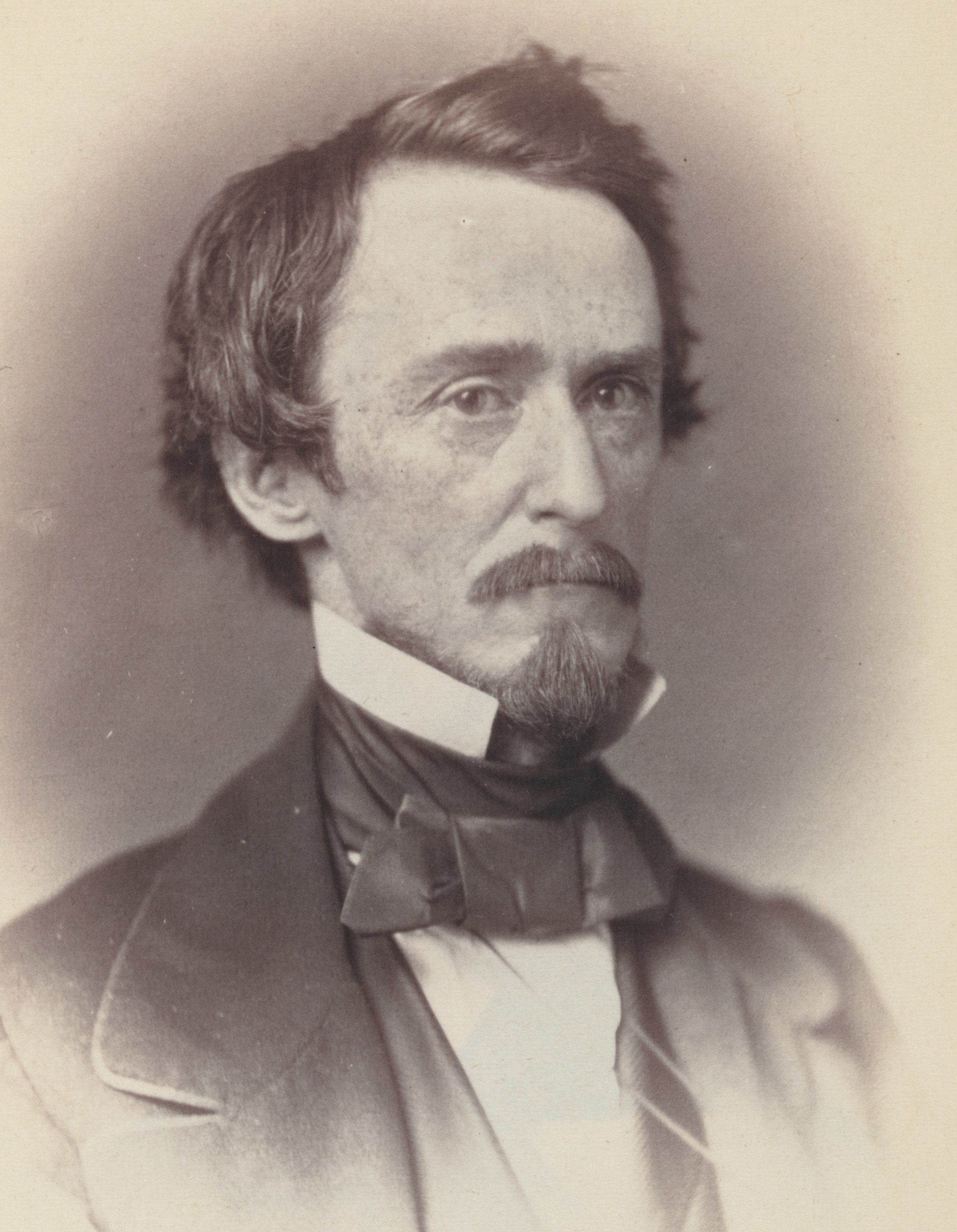
Edward Joy Morris

The Union established closer relations with the Sublime Porte during the Civil War. Ambassador James Williams, a native of Tennessee, resigned as soon as he knew of the war in early 1861 and became a Confederate propagandist in Britain and France. In May, Seward wrote a letter to the Ottoman government explaining the situation, but Williams's provisional successor, John Porter Brown, censored references to slavery before passing the letter to Mehmed Emin Âli Pasha, preventing frictions because slavery was legal in the empire. The new ambassador, Edward Joy Morris, was appointed in June and proved friendly and effective. Morris was received by the pledge of sultan Abdulaziz, the grand vizier, and other members of the Ottoman government to support the territorial integrity of the United States. Lincoln also wrote a letter of condolences for the recent passing of sultan Abdülmecid I, which was warmly received at the Ottoman court.

The Ottomans had imported American cottonseeds and agronomists since the 1840s. This lucrative agriculture expanded in Egypt during the 1850s, but could not compete with the established American cotton in European markets. The situation changed dramatically when the South ordered a cotton embargo at the beginning of the war. In October 1861, the Sublime Porte ordered all provinces to increase cotton production, which went from 15,000 bales in 1861 to 60,000 in 1862. This created an incentive for the Ottomans to declare their respect of the Union blockade and close their own ports to Confederate ships on April 23, 1862, labeling them pirates. Finally, the Ottomans were opposed to any separatist movements in the aftermath of the successful Greek and Serbian Revolutions, and the United States had never been involved in the decline of the Ottoman Empire, which made them not hostile to Turkish interests unlike the European powers. Rather, the undivided United States appeared to be the strong political and economic partner that Ottomans sought outside of Europe.

The Treaty of Commerce and Navigation was signed in February 1862. According to Morris, this was the most liberal foreign treaty signed by the Sublime Porte up to that point. U.S. exports to the Ottoman Empire increased dramatically and reached $2 million by 1870, including thousands of surplus rifles, cartridges, and bayonets acquired by the modernizing Ottoman Army after the war's end.

In 1865, the Empire of Mexico recruited 900 black Sudanese soldiers from Egypt under the belief that they would fight better in tropical climates and had immunity to yellow fever (they did not). Following a U.S. request, the Ottoman government announced that no more soldiers would be sent to Mexico.

The strengthening of American-Ottoman ties culminated with the opening of the first Ottoman embassy in Washington in 1867. However, the Union victory also emboldened the U.S. to intervene in the eastern Mediterranean and pursue the end of slavery there, leading to the first crisis between the two countries when the United States supported the Cretan Revolt in the same year.

== World perspective ==
Historian Don H. Doyle has argued that the Union victory had a major impact on the course of world history. The Union victory energized popular democratic forces. A Confederate victory, on the other hand, would have meant a new birth of slavery, not freedom. Historian Fergus Bordewich, following Doyle, argues that:

The North's victory decisively proved the durability of democratic government. Confederate independence, on the other hand, would have established an American model for reactionary politics and race-based repression that would likely have cast an international shadow into the twentieth century and perhaps beyond.

== See also ==
- Foreign enlistment in the American Civil War
- Native Americans in the American Civil War
- African Americans in the American Civil War
- History of U.S. foreign policy
- International relations of the Great Powers (1814–1919)
- Timeline of United States diplomatic history
- Diplomacy in the American Revolutionary War

== Notes ==
=== Works cited ===
- Forbes, David W., ed. (2001). Hawaiian National Bibliography, Vol 3: 1851–1880. Honolulu: University of Hawaii Press. ISBN 978-0-8248-2503-4. OCLC 314293370.
- Kuykendall, Ralph Simpson (1953). The Hawaiian Kingdom 1854–1874, Twenty Critical Years. Vol. 2. Honolulu: University of Hawaii Press. ISBN 978-0-87022-432-4. OCLC 47010821.
- Manning, Anita; Vance, Justin W. (2014). "Hawaiʻi at Home During the American Civil War". Hawaiian Journal of History. 47. Honolulu: Hawaiian Historical Society: 145–170. hdl:10524/47259.
- Shively, Carol A., ed. (2015). "Pacific Islanders and the Civil War". Asians and Pacific Islanders and the Civil War. Washington, D. C.: National Park Service. pp. 130–163. ISBN 978-1-59091-167-9. OCLC 904731668.
