= Blodgett Iceberg Tongue =

Iceberg tongue in Antarctica

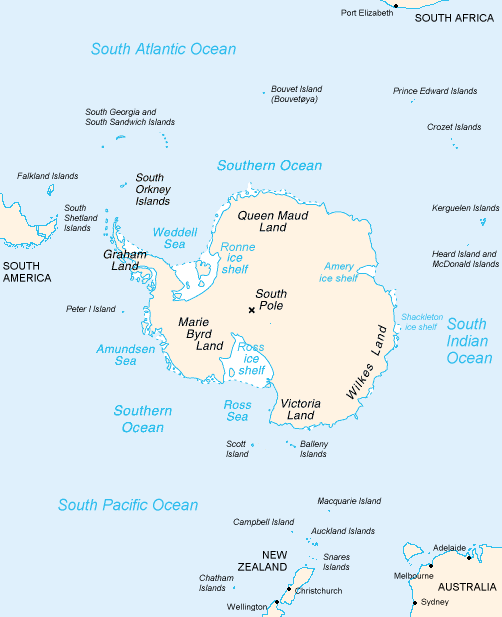
- Map of Antarctica, with Wilkes Land slightly to the right

- Location within Antarctica
- Location: Wilkes Land
- Coordinates: 66°05′00″S 130°00′00″E
- Thickness: unknown
- Terminus: Porpoise Bay
- Status: unknown

Blodgett Iceberg Tongue (66°5′S 130°0′E) is a large iceberg tongue that extends seaward from the vicinity of Cape Morse and Cape Carr on the east side of Porpoise Bay. It was named by the Advisory Committee on Antarctic Names for Gardner D. Blodgett, Office of Geography, Department of Interior, who, in 1955, prepared a sketch map of the coastal features of Antarctica between 84°E and 144°E from U.S. Navy Operation Highjump (1946–47) aerial photographs. Since the iceberg tongue was partially delineated for the first time on the 1955 sketch map by Blodgett, use of his name for it is considered appropriate.

== See also ==
- List of glaciers in the Antarctic
- Glaciology
