= May Glacier =

Glacier in Antarctica

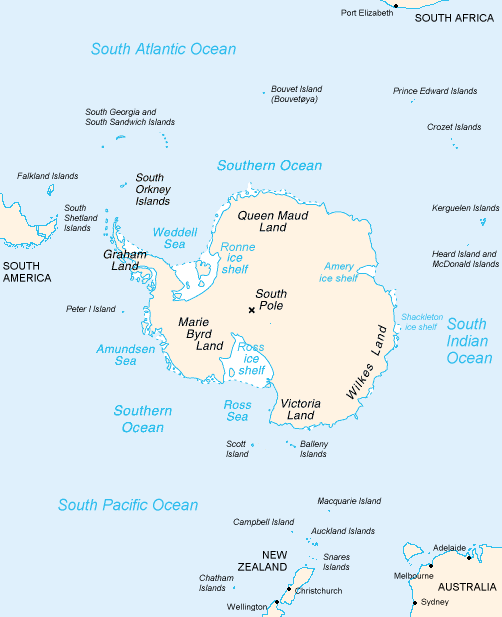
- Map of Antarctica, with Wilkes Land slightly to the right

- Location within Antarctica
- Type: channel
- Location: Wilkes Land
- Coordinates: 66°13′00″S 130°30′00″E
- Length: 6 nautical miles (11 km; 6.9 mi)
- Width: 5 nautical miles (9.3 km; 5.8 mi)
- Thickness: unknown
- Terminus: between Cape Morse and Cape Carr
- Status: unknown

May Glacier (66°13′S 130°30′E) is a channel glacier about 5 nautical miles (9 km) wide and 6 nautical miles (11 km) long, flowing to the coast of Antarctica between Cape Morse and Cape Carr. It was delineated from air photos taken by U.S. Navy Operation Highjump (1946–47), and was named by the Advisory Committee on Antarctic Names for William May, passed midshipman on the Flying Fish of the United States Exploring Expedition (1838–42) under Charles Wilkes.

== See also ==
- List of glaciers in the Antarctic
- Glaciology
