= Snedeker =

Snedeker may refer to:

- Bradley Snedeker (born 1977), American television actor
- Brandt Snedeker (born 1980), American golfer
- Caroline Snedeker (1871–1956), American writer
- Clifford W. Snedeker (1931–1996), American politician
- Colin Snedeker (1936–2016), British-born American chemist
- Edward W. Snedeker (1903–1995), officer of the United States Marine Corps with the rank of lieutenant general

== See also ==
- Snedeker Glacier, a channel glacier flowing to the Antarctic coast west of Merritt Island
- Snedeker's Landing or Waldberg Landing, now known as Haverstraw Beach State Park
