= Sandford Glacier =

Glacier in Antarctica

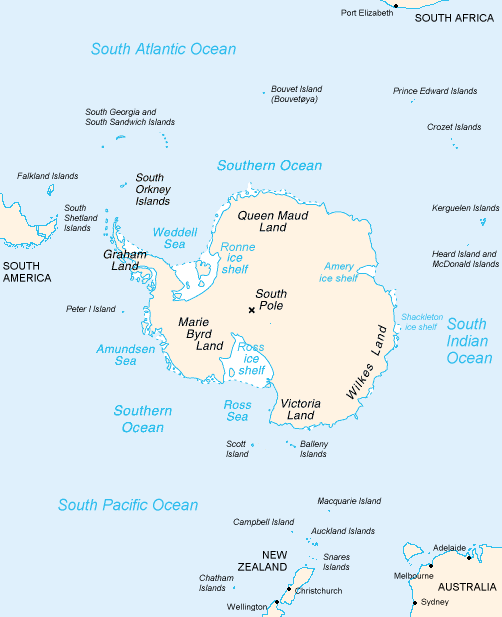
- Map of Antarctica, with Wilkes Land slightly to the right

- Location within Antarctica
- Type: channel
- Location: Wilkes Land
- Coordinates: 66°40′00″S 129°50′00″E
- Thickness: unknown
- Terminus: Porpoise Bay
- Status: unknown

Sandford Glacier (66°40′S 129°50′E) is a channel glacier flowing to the east side of Porpoise Bay, about 25 nautical miles (46 km) south-southwest of Cape Morse. Delineated from air photos taken by U.S. Navy Operation Highjump (1946–47). Named by Advisory Committee on Antarctic Names (US-ACAN) for Joseph P. Sandford, Passed Midshipman on the brig Porpoise of the United States Exploring Expedition (1838–42) under Wilkes.

== See also ==
- List of glaciers in the Antarctic
- Glaciology
