= Waldron Glacier =

Glacier in Antarctica

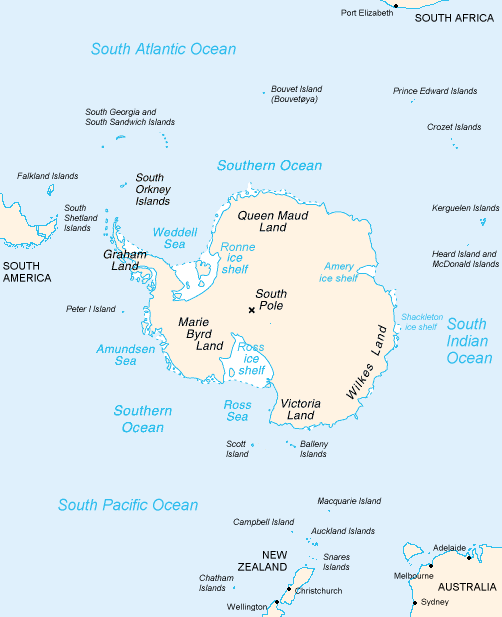
- Map of Antarctica, with Wilkes Land slightly to the right

- Location within Antarctica
- Location: Wilkes Land
- Coordinates: 66°31′00″S 130°00′00″E
- Thickness: unknown
- Terminus: Porpoise Bay
- Status: unknown

Waldron Glacier (66°31′S 130°0′E) is a channel glacier flowing to the east side of Porpoise Bay, midway between Sandford and Morse Glaciers. Delineated from air photos taken by U.S. Navy Operation Highjump (1946–47). Named by Advisory Committee on Antarctic Names (US-ACAN) for Thomas W. Waldron, captain's clerk on the brig Porpoise of the United States Exploring Expedition (1838–42) under Wilkes.

== See also ==
- List of glaciers in the Antarctic
- Glaciology
