= Bell Glacier =

Glacier in Antarctica

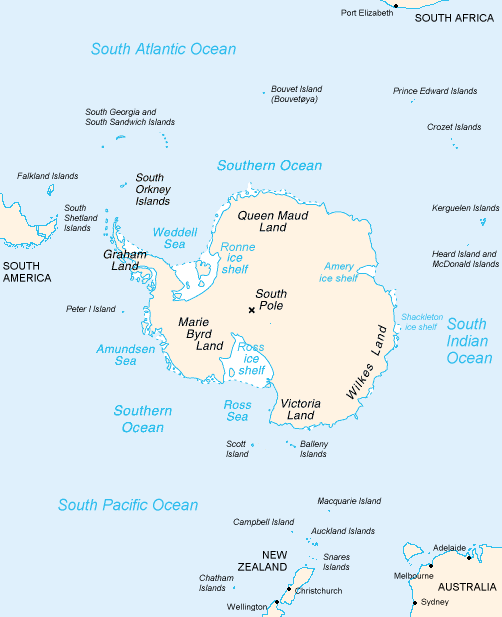
- Map of Antarctica, with Wilkes Land slightly to the right

- Location within Antarctica
- Location: Wilkes Land
- Coordinates: 66°42′00″S 124°54′00″E
- Thickness: unknown
- Terminus: Maury Bay
- Status: unknown

Bell Glacier (66°42′S 124°54′E) is a glacier draining northward into Maury Bay immediately eastward of Blair Glacier. It was mapped by Gardner Dean Blodgett (1955) from aerial photographs taken by U.S. Navy Operation Highjump (1946–47), and named by the Advisory Committee on Antarctic Names for Thomas G. Bell, boatswain on the sloop Peacock during the United States Exploring Expedition (1838–42) under Lieutenant Charles Wilkes.

== See also ==
- List of glaciers in the Antarctic
- Glaciology
