= Holmes Glacier =

Glacier in Antarctica

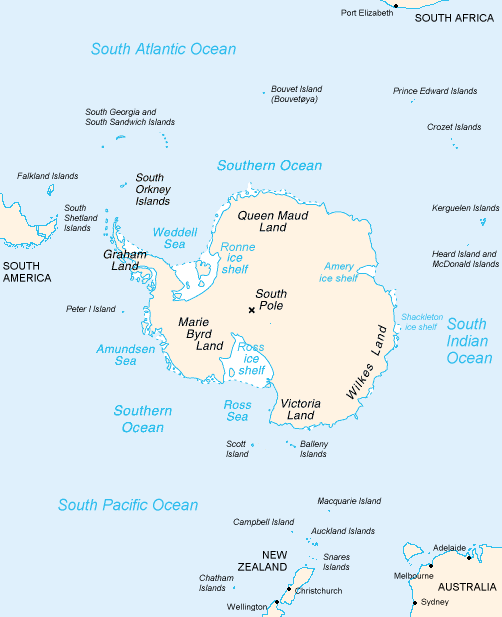
- Map of Antarctica, with Wilkes Land slightly to the right

- Location within Antarctica
- Location: Wilkes Land
- Coordinates: 66°46′00″S 126°54′00″E
- Thickness: unknown
- Terminus: Porpoise Bay
- Status: unknown

Holmes Glacier (66°46′S 126°54′E) is a broad glacier debouching into the western part of Porpoise Bay about 10 nautical miles (20 km) south of Cape Spieden. It was delineated from aerial photographs taken by U.S. Navy Operation Highjump (1946–47), and was named by the Advisory Committee on Antarctic Names after Dr. Silas Holmes, Assistant Surgeon on the brig Porpoise during the United States Exploring Expedition (1838–42) under Lieutenant Charles Wilkes.

== See also ==
- List of glaciers in the Antarctic
- Glaciology
