= Cape Carr =

Cape in Antarctica

Location of Cape Carr in Antarctica

Cape Carr (66°9′S 130°42′E) is a prominent, ice-covered cape, lying 15 nautical miles (30 km) northeast of Cape Morse.

== History ==
It was delineated from air photos taken by U.S. Navy Operation Highjump (1946–47). The United States Exploring Expedition (1838–42) under Charles Wilkes gave the name Cape Carr to an ice cape in about 65°5′S 131°30′E, naming it for Lieutenant Overton Carr of the flagship Vincennes. Identification of Cape Carr is based on the correlation of Wilkes' chart of 1840 with Gardner Dean Blodgett's reconnaissance map of 1955, compiled from air photos, taking into account the relative southwest shift of Porpoise Bay from the 3456 to the 15464 map positions.
