= William Lewis Maury =

American explorer and naval officer

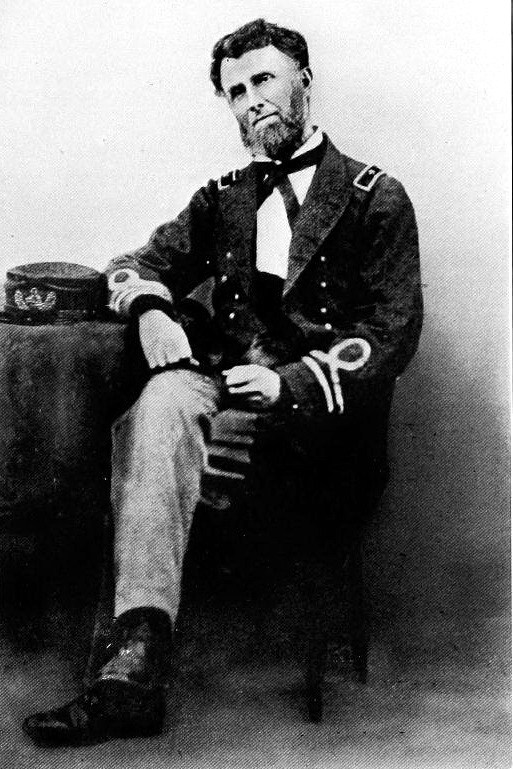
Maury during his command of CSS Georgia in 1863 or 1864

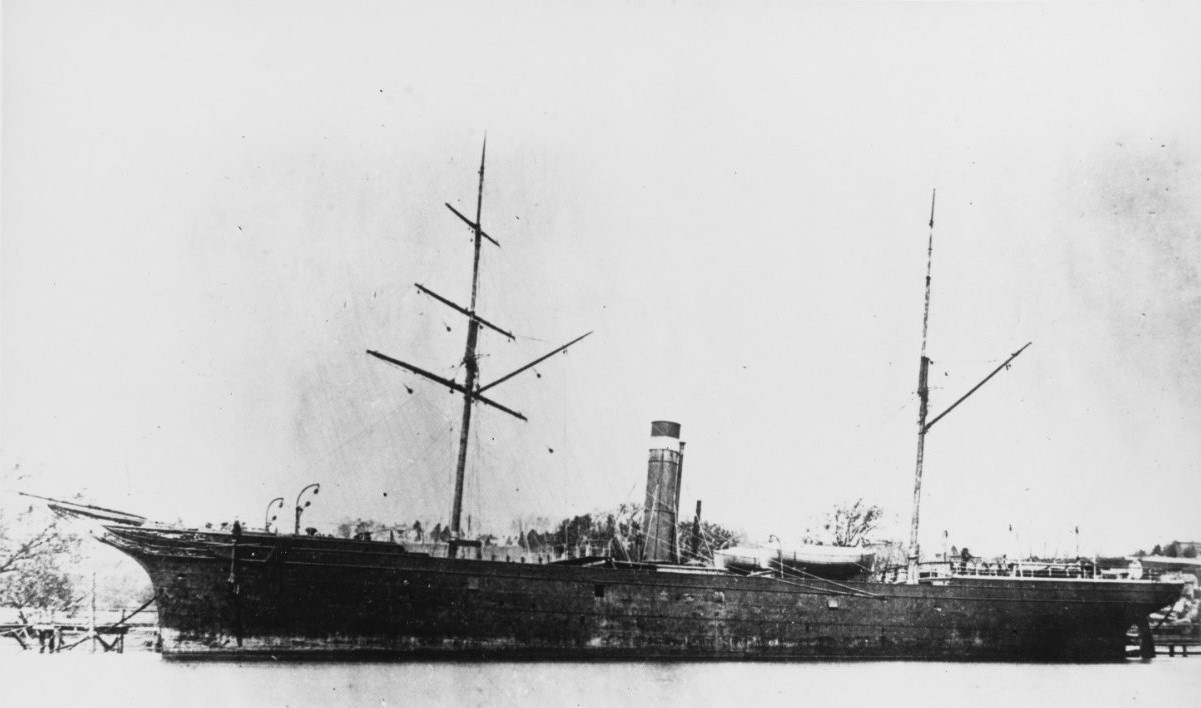
CSS GEORGIA 1863-1864

William Lewis Maury (c. 1813 – November 27, 1878) was an American explorer and naval officer who served in the United States Navy for over 32 years, assisting Charles Wilkes' exploration of the Pacific Ocean and served in Matthew C. Perry's 1854 naval mission to Japan. He later served as a Captain in the Confederate States Navy during the American Civil War.

== Biography ==
William Lewis Maury was born in Virginia, the son of William Grymes Maury and Ann Hoomes Woolfolk, and became a midshipman in the United States Navy in 1829. Maury served in the United States Naval Observatory under his cousin, superintendent Matthew Fontaine Maury; in charting the seas, cartography, and in recording astronomical observations.

In the famed United States Exploring Expedition then Lieutenant Maury served under Charles Wilkes from 1838-1842. He served on the ships Vincennes; joined the Peacock at Orange Bay, and the Porpoise at Callao.

It was during the Exploring Expedition's survey of Puget Sound that Commodore Wilkes named Maury Island after William Lewis Maury. Maury continued in Navy service serving on the Navy Efficiency Board. In 1860 he served as a member of the Japanese Treaty Commission.

When the American Civil War began he resigned his commission and joined the Confederate States Navy. He was initially assigned to a coastal defense battery at Sewell's Point, Virginia. His talent for coastline defense was recognized early on and he was reassigned to the Confederate Torpedo Service. Serving first at Wilmington Station and Charlotte, North Carolina, he was soon transferred to Charleston Station. Later, as commander of the ship CSS Georgia, a commerce raider, he captured and sank several ships carrying war materials while letting others with commerce not for war go free.

== Legacy ==
As a member of Wilkes' expedition, the Maury name was applied to a discovered feature of Puget Sound, Maury Island. In the 20th century, an ice-filled bay east of Cape Lewis, Antarctica, Maury Bay, was named after this explorer.

== Sources ==
- Morgan, James Morris (1917). Recollections of a Rebel Reefer. Houghton Mifflin Company.
