= De Haven Glacier =

Glacier in Antarctica

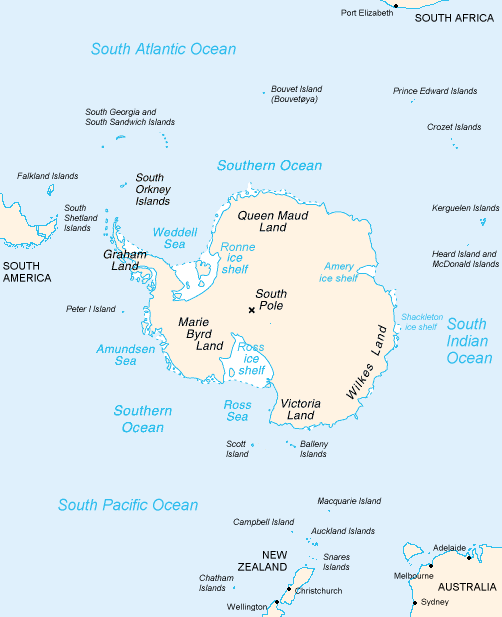
- Map of Antarctica, with Wilkes Land slightly to the right

- Location within Antarctica
- Location: Wilkes Land
- Coordinates: 67°03′00″S 127°32′00″E
- Thickness: unknown
- Terminus: Porpoise Bay
- Status: unknown

De Haven Glacier (67°3′S 127°32′E) is a broad glacier flowing to the southwest corner of Porpoise Bay. It was delineated by Gardner Dean Blodgett (1955) from aerial photographs taken by U.S. Navy Operation Highjump (1946–47), and was named by the Advisory Committee on Antarctic Names for Edwin De Haven, Acting Master on the sloop Vincennes during the United States Exploring Expedition (1838–42) under Lieutenant Charles Wilkes.

== See also ==
- List of glaciers in the Antarctic
- Glaciology
