= Frost Glacier =

Glacier in Antarctica

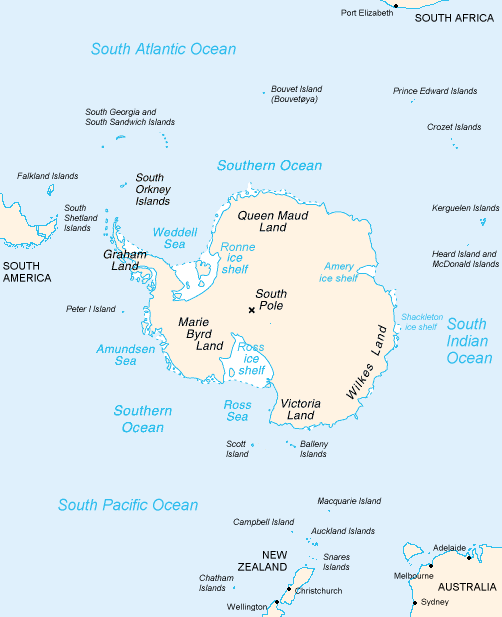
- Map of Antarctica, with Wilkes Land slightly to the right

- Location within Antarctica
- Location: Wilkes Land
- Coordinates: 67°5′S 129°00′E
- Thickness: unknown
- Terminus: Porpoise Bay
- Status: unknown

Frost Glacier (67°5′S 129°0′E) is a channel glacier flowing to the head of Porpoise Bay, Antarctica. It was delineated from air photos taken by U.S. Navy Operation Highjump (1946–47), and named by the Advisory Committee on Antarctic Names for John Frost, boatswain on the brig Porpoise of the United States Exploring Expedition (1838–42) under Charles Wilkes.

== See also ==
- List of glaciers in the Antarctic
- Glaciology
