= Cape Lewis =

Peninsula in Antarctica

Cape Lewis (66°30′S 124°30′E) is an ice-covered cape at the west side of Maury Bay, on the coast of Antarctica. It was delineated by Gardner Dean Blodgett (1955) from air photos taken by U.S. Navy Operation Highjump (1946–47), and was named by the Advisory Committee on Antarctic Names after Thomas Lewis, a crew member on the sloop Peacock during the United States Exploring Expedition (1838–42) under Lieutenant Charles Wilkes.
