= CSS Georgia (1862) =

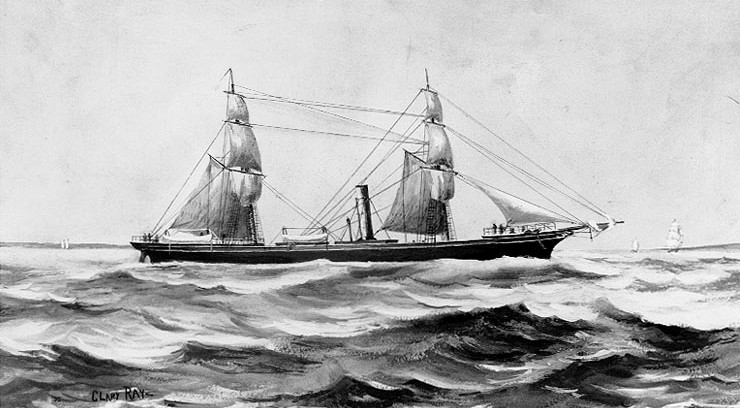
- CSS Georgia

History

United Kingdom
- Name: Japan
- Launched: 1862
- Fate: Sold to Confederate States Navy March 1863

Confederate States
- Name: Japan
- Acquired: March 1863
- Commissioned: 9 April 1863
- Renamed: CSS Georgia 9 April 1863
- Captured: By USS Niagara, 15 August 1864
- Fate: Sold

United States
- Name: Georgia
- In service: 5 August 1865
- Fate: Re-registered in Canada 1870

Canada
- Name: Georgia
- Operator: Quebec and Gulf Ports Company
- In service: 1870
- Fate: Wrecked 14 January 1875

General characteristics (as Confederate States Navy steamer)
- Type: Screw steamer
- Displacement: 600 tons
- Length: 212 ft (65 m)
- Beam: 27 ft (8.2 m)
- Depth of hold: 13 ft 9 in (4.19 m)
- Propulsion: Steam engine and sails
- Armament: 2 × 100-pounder cannon; 2 × 24-pounder cannon; 1 × 32-pounder cannon

CSS Georgia was a screw steamer of the Confederate States Navy, acquired in 1863, and captured by the Union Navy in 1864.

== Construction ==
The ship was built in 1862 as the fast merchantman Japan. She had a round stern, iron frame, fiddle-bow figurehead, short, thick funnel and full poop. Having an iron hull, she was clearly unsuited to long cruises without drydocking during a period when antifouling under-body coatings were yet unknown. Commander James Dunwoody Bulloch, a key Confederate procurement agent overseas, would have nothing to do with iron bottoms, but Commander Matthew Fontaine Maury settled for Japan because wood (which could be coppered) was being superseded in Great Britain by the new metal; consequently wooden newbuilding contracts were not easy to buy up in British shipyards.

== Service history ==
=== Confederate States Navy ===
The Confederate States Government purchased her at Dumbarton, Scotland, in March 1863. On 1 April 1863, she departed Greenock, reputedly bound for the East Indies and carrying a crew of fifty who had shipped for a voyage to Singapore. She rendezvoused with the steamer Alar off Ushant, France, and took on guns, ordnance and other stores. On 9 April 1863 the Confederate flag was hoisted and she was placed in commission as CSS Georgia, Commander William Lewis Maury, CSN, in command. Her orders read to prey against United States shipping wherever found.

Calling at Bahia, Brazil and at Trinidad, Georgia recrossed the Atlantic Ocean to Simon's Bay, Cape Colony, Africa, where she arrived on 16 August 1863. She sailed next to Santa Cruz, Tenerife, in the Canary Islands, thence up to Cherbourg, France, arriving 28 October 1863. During this short cruise she captured nine prizes.

While Georgia was undergoing repairs at Cherbourg in late January 1864, it was decided to shift her armament to CSS Rappahannock. The transfer was never effected, however, and Georgia was moved to an anchorage 3 nautical miles (5.6 km; 3.5 mi) below Bordeaux, France.

On her arrival, in the spring of 1864 to the port city of Mogador, Morocco, her crew upon landing, was driven off by local Moroccans. This resulted in the only time the Confederacy would fire guns in hostility outside of North America.

On 2 May 1864 she was taken to Liverpool and sold on 1 June 1864 to a merchant of that city over the protest of Charles Francis Adams, Sr., United States Minister to Great Britain. The steamer again put to sea on 11 August 1864, and on 15 August 1864 was captured by the United States Navy frigate USS Niagara off Portugal. She was sent into Boston, Massachusetts, where she was condemned and sold as a lawful prize of the United States.

=== Merchant ship ===
The ship was documented as the U.S. merchant ship SS Georgia in New Bedford, Massachusetts, on 5 August 1865. She was reregistered in Canada in 1870. The property of the Quebec and Gulf Ports Company and still named SS Georgia, she was on a voyage from Halifax, Nova Scotia, to Portland, Maine, when she was wrecked without loss of life on the Northern Triangles, a reef in Penobscot Bay off the coast of Maine, at 43°55′39″N 069°01′40″W on 14 January 1875 while steaming at night in a snowstorm.
