= Thompson Glacier =

Glacier in Wilkes Land, Antarctica

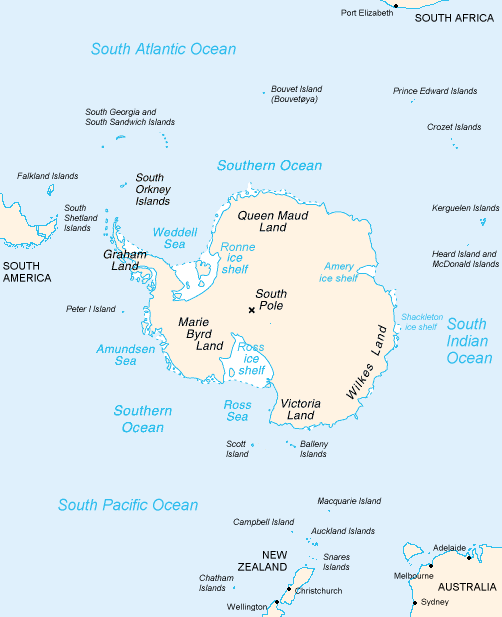
- Map of Antarctica, with Wilkes Land slightly to the right

- Location within Antarctica
- Type: channel
- Location: Wilkes Land
- Coordinates: 66°45′00″S 123°39′00″E
- Thickness: unknown
- Terminus: Paulding Bay
- Status: unknown

Thompson Glacier (66°45′S 123°39′E) is a channel glacier draining northward to the head of Paulding Bay. Delineated by Gardner Dean Blodgett (1955) from aerial photographs taken by Operation Highjump (1946–47). Named by Advisory Committee on Antarctic Names (US-ACAN) after Egbert Thompson, Midshipman on the sloop Wilkes.

== See also ==
- List of glaciers in the Antarctic
- Glaciology
