= DuBeau Glacier =

Glacier in Antarctica

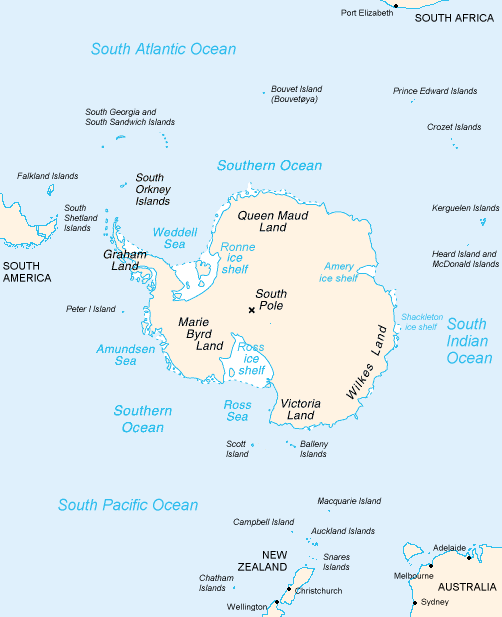
- Map of Antarctica, with Wilkes Land slightly to the right

- Location within Antarctica
- Type: channel glacier
- Location: Wilkes Land
- Coordinates: 65°30′00″S 135°00′00″E
- Length: 18 nautical miles (33 km; 21 mi)
- Thickness: unknown
- Status: unknown

DuBeau Glacier (66°23′S 106°27′E) is a channel glacier flowing to the Antarctic coast 18 nautical miles (33 km) west of Merritt Island. It was mapped in 1955 by Gardner Dean Blodgett from air photos taken by U.S. Navy Operation Highjump in 1947, and was named by the Advisory Committee on Antarctic Names for Earl P. DuBeau, a photo interpreter with U.S. Navy Operation Windmill (1947–48), who assisted in establishing astronomical control stations along Queen Mary Coast, Knox Coast and Budd Coast.

== See also ==
- List of glaciers in the Antarctic
- Glaciology
