= Blair Glacier =

Glacier in Antarctica

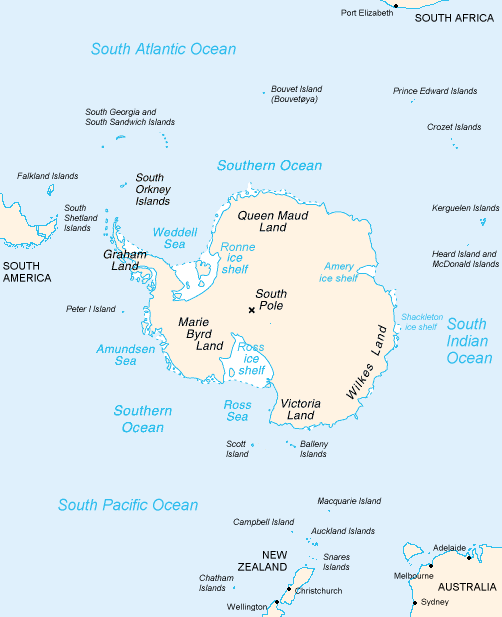
- Map of Antarctica, with Wilkes Land slightly to the right

- Location within Antarctica
- Location: Wilkes Land
- Coordinates: 66°45′00″S 124°32′00″E
- Thickness: unknown
- Terminus: Maury Bay
- Status: unknown

Blair Glacier (66°45′S 124°32′E) is a glacier draining northward to the western corner of Maury Bay. It was delineated from aerial photographs taken by U.S. Navy Operation Highjump (1946–47), and named by the Advisory Committee on Antarctic Names for James L. Blair, Midshipman on the sloop Peacock during the United States Exploring Expedition (1838–42) under Lieutenant Charles Wilkes.

== See also ==
- List of glaciers in the Antarctic
- Glaciology
