= Pourquoi Pas Glacier =

Glacier in Antarctica

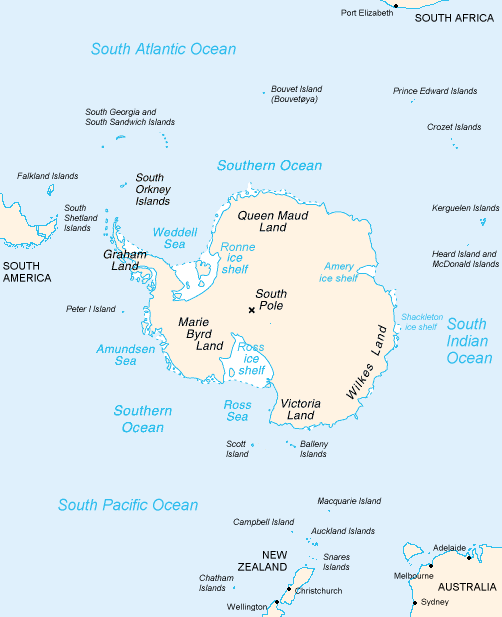
- Map of Antarctica, with Wilkes Land slightly to the right

- Location within Antarctica
- Location: Wilkes Land
- Coordinates: 66°15′00″S 135°55′00″E
- Length: 15 nautical miles (28 km; 17 mi)
- Width: 4 nautical miles (7.4 km; 4.6 mi)
- Thickness: unknown
- Terminus: Pourquoi Pas Point
- Status: unknown

Pourquoi Pas Glacier (66°15′S 135°55′E) is a glacier 4 nautical miles (7 km) wide and 15 nautical miles (28 km) long, flowing north-northwest from the continental ice and terminating in a prominent tongue 9 nautical miles (17 km) west-northwest of Pourquoi Pas Point. Delineated by French cartographers from air photos taken by U.S. Navy Operation Highjump, 1946–47. Named in 1952 by the French Antarctic Sub-committee after the Pourquoi-Pas?, polar ship of the French Antarctic Expedition under Charcot, 1908–10, later used by Charcot in expeditions to Greenland.

Pourquoi Pas Glacier Tongue (66°10′S 136°0′E) is a prominent glacier tongue 4 nautical miles (7 km) wide and 6 nautical miles (11 km) long, extending seaward from Pourquoi Pas Glacier. Delineated from air photos taken by U.S. Navy Operation Highjump, 1946–47, and named for the French polar ship Pourquoi-Pas?.

== See also ==
- List of glaciers in the Antarctic
- Glaciology
