= Snedeker Glacier =

Glacier in Antarctica

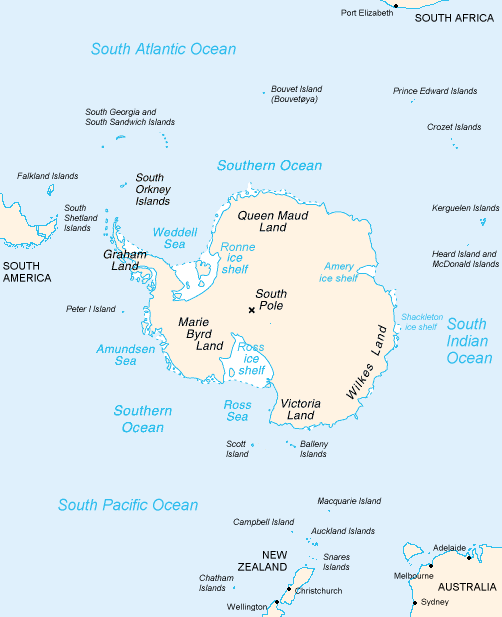
- Map of Antarctica, with Wilkes Land slightly to the right

- Location within Antarctica
- Type: channel
- Location: Wilkes Land
- Coordinates: 66°28′00″S 106°48′00″E
- Thickness: unknown
- Status: unknown

Snedeker Glacier (66°28′S 106°48′E) is a channel glacier flowing to the Antarctic coast 9 nautical miles (17 km) west of Merritt Island. Mapped (1955) by Gardner Dean Blodgett from air photos taken by U.S. Navy Operation Highjump (1946–47). Named by Advisory Committee on Antarctic Names (US-ACAN) for Robert H. Snedeker, photo interpreter with U.S. Navy Operation Windmill (1947–48), who assisted in establishing astronomical control stations along the coast from Wilhelm II Coast to Budd Coast.

== See also ==
- List of glaciers in the Antarctic
- Glaciology
