= Maury Bay =

Bay in Antarctica

Maury Bay (66°33′S 124°42′E) is an ice-filled bay indenting the coast of Antarctica just east of Cape Lewis. It was mapped by Gardner Dean Blodgett in 1955 from aerial photographs taken by U.S. Navy Operation Highjump (1946–47), and named by the Advisory Committee on Antarctic Names for William Lewis Maury, lieutenant on the brig Porpoise during the United States Exploring Expedition (1838–42) under Lieutenant Charles Wilkes.
