= Cape Morse =

Cape in Wilkes Land, Antarctica

Location of Cape Morse in Antarctica

Cape Morse (66°15′S 130°10′E) is a low, ice-covered cape which marks the east side of the entrance to Porpoise Bay and forms the division between Banzare Coast and Clarie Coast in Wilkes Land, Antarctica. It was delineated from air photos taken by U.S. Navy Operation Highjump in 1946–1947, and was named by the Advisory Committee on Antarctic Names for William H. Morse, purser's steward on the brig Porpoise of the United States Exploring Expedition (1838–1842) under Charles Wilkes.

Located about 3 miles southwest of Cape Morse, Morse Glacier (66°21′S 130°5′E) is a channel glacier flowing to the east side of Porpoise Bay. It was also mapped from the air photos taken by Operation Highjump.

Due to an inadvertent error, the names of these locations were incorrectly spelled "Cape Mose" and "Mose Glacier" for a number of years.
