= Porpoise Bay, Antarctica =

Bay on the coast of Antarctica

Location of Porpoise Bay in Antarctica

Porpoise Bay is an ice-filled embayment about 90 miles (140 km) wide indenting the coast of Antarctica between Cape Goodenough and Cape Morse. The United States Exploring Expedition (1838–42) under Charles Wilkes applied the name "Porpoise Bay", after the USEE brig "Porpoise", to a large bay at about 66°S, 130°E. US-ACAN's identification of Porpoise Bay is based on the correlation of Wilkes' chart (1840) with Gardner Dean Blodgett's reconnaissance map (1955) compiled from air photos taken by USN Operation Highjump (1946–47). The name has been applied to the large embayment lying close southwest in keeping with Wilkes' original naming.

Porpoise Basin (66°10′S 128°30′E) is an undersea basin, located close to Porpoise Bay. Porpoise Canyon (64°20′S 131°0′E) is an undersea canyon located about 300 miles (480 km) from Porpoise Bay; it is one of the largest canyons in the Wilkes Land continental margin.
