= Smith Islands =

Pair of islands in Wilkes Land, Antarctica

- Location within Antarctica

Geography
- Location: Antarctica
- Coordinates: 66°18′S 110°27′E
- Archipelago: Windmill Islands

Administration
- Administered under the Antarctic Treaty System

Demographics
- Population: Uninhabited

The Smith Islands are two Antarctic islands lying close to Tracy Point, the western extremity of Beall Island, in the Windmill Islands. They were first mapped from air photos taken by USN Operation Highjump and Operation Windmill in 1947 and 1948. The islands were named for the US-ACAN for Aerographer's Mate Roger E. Smith, USN, a member of the Wilkes Station party of 1958.

== See also ==
- Composite Gazetteer of Antarctica
- List of Antarctic and subantarctic islands
- Scientific Committee on Antarctic Research
- Territorial claims in Antarctica
