= Løken Moraines =

Moraines in Antarctica

The Løken Moraines (66°17′S 110°37′E) are a line of north–south trending moraines, about 7 nautical miles (13 km) long, lying from 0.5 to 2 nautical miles (1 to 4 km) inland from the Windmill Islands off Antarctica, just east of the bases of Clark, Bailey and Mitchell Peninsulas. The moraines were first mapped from air photos taken by U.S. Navy Operation Highjump (1946–47) and Operation Windmill (1947–48), and were named by Carl R. Eklund for Olav Løken, a Norwegian glaciologist who was a member of the Wilkes Station party, 1957.
