= Patterson Rock =

Island off Antarctica

Patterson Rock (66°13′S 110°35′E) is an insular rock 0.5 nautical miles (0.9 km) west of Cameron Island, in the Swain Islands. This region was photographed from the air by U.S. Navy Operation Highjump (1946–47), ANARE (Australian National Antarctic Research Expeditions) (1956) and the Soviet expedition (1956). The rock was included in a 1957 ground survey by C.R. Eklund, who named it for Acy H. Patterson, U.S. Navy, electrician at Wilkes Station, 1957.
