= Berkley Island =

Island in Antarctica

- Location within Antarctica

Geography
- Coordinates: 66°13′S 110°39′E
- Archipelago: Swain Islands
- Length: 1 km (0.6 mi)

Administration
- Administered under the Antarctic Treaty System

Demographics
- Population: Uninhabited

Berkley Island (66°13′S 110°39′E) is an island, 1 km long, which marks the north-eastern end of the Swain Islands. It was first mapped from air photos taken by U.S. Navy Operation Highjump, 1946–47, and was included in a survey of the Swain Islands in 1957 by Wilkes Station personnel under Carl R. Eklund. It was named by Eklund for Richard J. Berkley, a geomagnetician with the US-IGY wintering party of 1957 at Wilkes Station.

== Important Bird Area ==
The island, along with neighbouring Cameron Island, the intervening sea and smaller islets, has been identified as a 97 ha Important Bird Area by BirdLife International because it supports some 14,000 pairs of breeding Adélie penguins (as estimated from January 2011 satellite imagery). It lies about 9 km east of Australia's Casey Station.

== See also ==
- Composite Antarctic Gazetteer
- List of Antarctic islands south of 60° S
- Scientific Committee on Antarctic Research
- Territorial claims in Antarctica
