= McIntyre Island =

Island in Antarctica

- Location within Antarctica

Geography
- Location: Antarctica
- Coordinates: 66°14′S 110°34′E
- Archipelago: Windmill Islands

Administration
- Administered under the Antarctic Treaty System

Demographics
- Population: Uninhabited

McIntyre Island is a small Antarctic island just west of Blakeney Point, Clark Peninsula, in the Windmill Islands. It was photographed from the air by USN Operation Highjump in 1946-47 and was included in a 1957 ground survey by C. R. Eklund. It was named by the latter for construction mechanic Albert McIntyre, USN, of the Wilkes Station party, 1957.

== See also ==
- Composite Antarctic Gazetteer
- List of Antarctic and sub-Antarctic islands
- List of Antarctic islands south of 60° S
- SCAR
- Territorial claims in Antarctica
