= Hailstorm Island =

Island in Antarctica

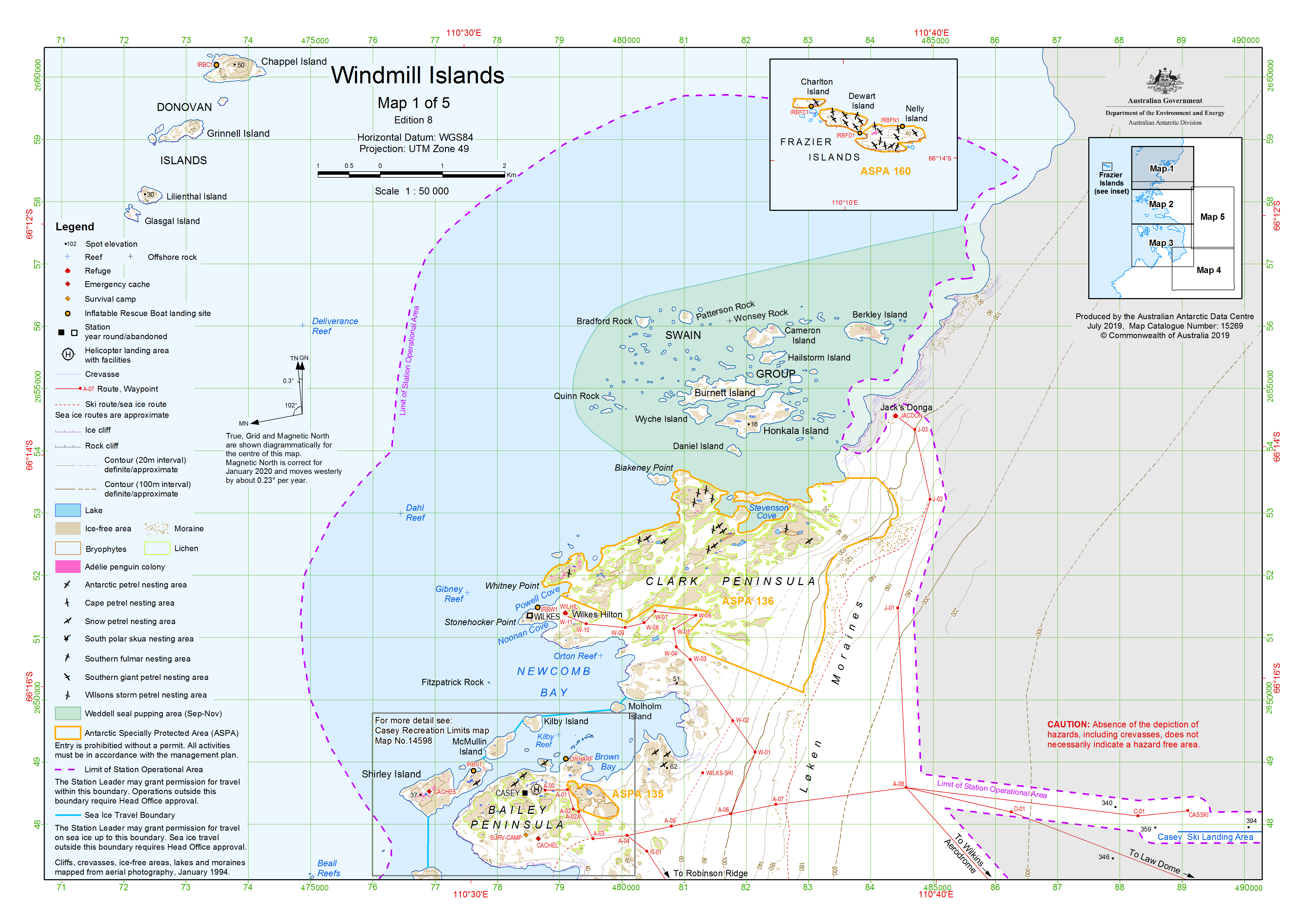

- Location within Antarctica

Geography
- Location: Antarctica
- Coordinates: 66°13′S 110°37′E

Administration
- Administered under the Antarctic Treaty System

Demographics
- Population: Uninhabited

Hailstorm Island is a rocky island, 0.5 kilometres (0.25 nmi) long, between Cameron Island and the east end of Burnett Island in the central part of the Swain Islands, Antarctica. It was first roughly mapped from air photos taken by U.S. Navy Operation Highjump, 1946–47, and included in a 1957 survey of the Swain Islands by Wilkes Station personnel under Carl R. Eklund. It was named by Eklund for Radioman Kenneth J. Hailstorm, U.S. Navy, a Naval support force member of the 1957 wintering party at Wilkes Station during the International Geophysical Year.

== See also ==
- List of antarctic and sub-antarctic islands
