= Molholm Island =

Island in Antarctica

- Location within Antarctica

Geography
- Location: Antarctica
- Coordinates: 66°16′S 110°33′E
- Archipelago: Windmill Islands

Administration
- Administered under the Antarctic Treaty System

Demographics
- Population: Uninhabited

Molholm Island is an island at the entrance to McGrady Cove in the eastern part of Newcomb Bay, in the Windmill Islands of Antarctica. The island was mapped from air photographs taken by U.S. Navy Operation Highjump in 1946–47, and was named by Carl R. Eklund for John Molholm, a glaciologist at Wilkes Station in 1957.

== See also ==
- List of antarctic and sub-antarctic islands
- Molholm Shoal, 0.1 nautical miles (0.2 km) west of Molholm Island
