= Denison Island =

Island in Antarctica

- Location within Antarctica

Geography
- Location: Vincennes Bay, Antarctica
- Coordinates: 66°18′S 110°27′E
- Archipelago: Windmill Islands

Administration
- Administered under the Antarctic Treaty System

Demographics
- Population: Uninhabited

Denison Island is an Antarctic island lying 0.5 kilometres (0.25 nmi) west of Beall Island in the Windmill Islands. It was first mapped from air photos taken by USN Operation Highjump and Operation Windmill in 1947 and 1948. It was named by the US-ACAN for Dean R. Denison, auroral scientist and member of the Wilkes Station party of 1958.

== See also ==
- Composite Antarctic Gazetteer
- List of Antarctic and sub-Antarctic islands
- List of Antarctic islands south of 60° S
- SCAR
- Territorial claims in Antarctica
