= Wonsey Rock =

Rock in the Swain Islands

- Location within Antarctica

Geography
- Coordinates: 66°13′S 110°36′E
- Archipelago: Swain Islands

Administration
- Administered under the Antarctic Treaty System

Demographics
- Population: Uninhabited

Wonsey Rock is a small rock north of Cameron Island in the Swain Islands. This region was photographed by U.S. Navy Operation Highjump (1946–47), ANARE (Australian National Antarctic Research Expeditions) (1956), and the Soviet expedition (1956). It was included in a 1957 survey of the islands north of Wilkes Station by C.R. Eklund. He named the rock for construction mechanic Duane J. Wonsey, U.S. Navy, of the Wilkes Station party, 1957.

== See also ==
- Composite Antarctic Gazetteer
- List of Antarctic and sub-Antarctic islands
- List of Antarctic islands south of 60° S
- SCAR
- Territorial claims in Antarctica
