= Orton Reef =

Reef in Antarctica

Orton Reef (66°16′S 110°33′E) is a reef with a least depth of 2 ft in the north part of Newcomb Bay, located 0.5 nautical miles (0.9 km) north of Molholm Island in the Windmill Islands. Discovered and charted in February 1957 by a party from the USS Wilkes Station, who assisted in an ANARE (Australian National Antarctic Research Expeditions) survey of Newcomb Bay in the 1961–62 season.
