= Lilienthal Island =

Island in Antarctica

- Location within Antarctica

Geography
- Location: Antarctica
- Coordinates: 66°12′S 110°23′E

Administration
- Administered under the Antarctic Treaty System

Demographics
- Population: Uninhabited

Lilienthal Island is one of the Donovan Islands, lying just north of Glasgal Island in Vincennes Bay, Antarctica. The island was mapped from air photographs taken by U.S. Navy Operation Highjump, 1946–47, and was named by Carl R. Eklund for Billie R. Lilienthal, U.S. Navy, aerographer at Wilkes Station, 1957.

== See also ==
- List of antarctic and sub-antarctic islands
