= Wyche Island =

Island in the Swain Islands, Antarctica

Wyche
- Location within Antarctica

Geography
- Coordinates: 66°14′S 110°35′E
- Archipelago: Swain Islands

Administration
- Administered under the Antarctic Treaty System

Demographics
- Population: Uninhabited

Wyche Island is a small island just south of the west end of Burnett Island in the Swain Islands. This region was photographed from the air by U.S. Navy Operation Highjump (1946–47), ANARE (Australian National Antarctic Research Expeditions) (1956), and the Soviet expedition (1956). The island was included in a 1957 ground survey by C. R. Eklund. He named it for aerographer's mate Paul A. Wyche, U.S. Navy, a member of the Wilkes Station party, 1957.

== See also ==
- Composite Antarctic Gazetteer
- List of Antarctic and sub-Antarctic islands
- List of Antarctic islands south of 60° S
- SCAR
- Territorial claims in Antarctica
