= Green Rocks =

Cluster of rocks

The Green Rocks (66°14′S 110°38′E) are a small cluster of rocks, 0.25 nautical miles (0.5 km) east of Honkala Island and an equal distance offshore, in the eastern part of the Swain Islands of Antarctica. They were first mapped from air photos taken by U.S. Navy Operation Highjump, 1946–47, and are included in a 1957 survey of the Swain Islands by Wilkes Station personnel under Carl R. Eklund. They were named by Eklund for Construction Driver Sydney E. Green, a U.S. Navy support force member of the 1957 wintering party at Wilkes Station during the International Geophysical Year.
