= Magee Rock =

Magee Rock (66°13′S 110°37′E) is an insular rock lying 0.2 nautical miles (0.4 km) northeast of Cameron Island, in the Swain Islands of Antarctica. This region was photographed from the air by U.S. Navy Operation Highjump (1946–47), Australian National Antarctic Research Expeditions (1956) and the Soviet expedition (1956). The rock was included in a 1957 ground survey by Carl R. Eklund, who named it for George E. Magee, U.S. Navy, a carpenter at Wilkes Station, 1957.
