= Bøving Island =

Small island in Newcomb Bay, Antarctica

- Location within Antarctica

Geography
- Location: Antarctica
- Coordinates: 66°17′S 110°31′E
- Archipelago: Windmill Islands

Administration
- Administered under the Antarctic Treaty System

Demographics
- Population: Uninhabited

Bøving Island is a small Antarctic island in the south part of Newcomb Bay, lying 0.2 km (0.1 nmi) east of McMullin Island in the Windmill Islands. It was first mapped from air photos taken by USN Operation Highjump in 1946 and 1947. Named by ANCA for F. Bøving, third officer on MV Thala Dan in 1965, who assisted in a hydrographic survey in the vicinity.

== See also ==
- Composite Antarctic Gazetteer
- List of Antarctic and sub-Antarctic islands
