= Daniel Island, Antarctica =

Island in Antarctica

Daniel Island
- Location within Antarctica

Geography
- Location: Antarctica
- Coordinates: 66°14′S 110°36′E

Administration
- Administered under the Antarctic Treaty System

Demographics
- Population: Uninhabited

Daniel Island is a small, rocky island which lies south of Honkala Island and marks the south end of Swain Islands, Antarctica. First roughly mapped as part of the Swain Islands from air photos taken by U.S. Navy Operation Highjump, 1946–47, and included in a 1957 survey by Wilkes Station personnel under C.R. Eklund. Named by Eklund for Commissaryman 2d Class David Daniel, U.S. Navy, cook and Navy support force member of the 1957 wintering party at Wilkes Station during the IGY.

== See also ==
- List of antarctic and sub-antarctic islands
