= Cronk Islands =

Island group in Antarctica

- Location within Antarctica

Geography
- Location: Antarctica
- Coordinates: 66°19′S 110°25′E
- Archipelago: Windmill Islands

Administration
- Administered under the Antarctic Treaty System

Demographics
- Population: Uninhabited

The Cronk Islands are a group of Antarctic islands lying northeast of Hollin Island, in the Windmill Islands. They were first mapped from air photos taken by USN Operation Highjump in 1946 and 1947. They were named by the US-ACAN for Caspar Cronk, glaciologist at Wilkes Station in 1958.

== See also ==
- Composite Antarctic Gazetteer
- List of Antarctic and sub-Antarctic islands
- List of Antarctic islands south of 60° S
- SCAR
- Territorial claims in Antarctica
