= Tracy Point =

Westernmost point of Beall Island, Antarctica

Tracy Point (66°18′S 110°27′E) is the westernmost point of Beall Island in the Windmill Islands of Antarctica. First mapped from air photos taken by U.S. Navy Operation Highjump and Operation Windmill in 1947 and 1948. Named by the Advisory Committee on Antarctic Names (US-ACAN) for Radioman Gordon F. Tracy, U.S. Navy, a member of the Wilkes Station party of 1958.
