= Lilienthal =

Lilienthal may refer to:

- Lilienthal (surname)
- Lilienthal, Lower Saxony, a village in Germany
- Lilienthal, the former German name of Białczyn, a village in Poland
- Lilienthal Glacier, Graham Land, Antarctica
- Lilienthal Island, Antarctica
- 13610 Lilienthal, an asteroid
- Lilienthal Berlin, a German brand of watches
- Berlin Tegel Airport, also called Otto Lilienthal Airport

== See also ==
- Liliental, a 1978 music group featuring Asmus Tietchens, Conny Plank, Dieter Moebius, and others
