= Glasgal Island =

Island in Antarctica

- Location within Antarctica

Geography
- Location: Antarctica
- Coordinates: 66°12′S 110°23′E
- Archipelago: Donovan Islands

Administration
- Administered under the Antarctic Treaty System

Demographics
- Population: Uninhabited

Glasgal Island is a small island which marks the southwestern extremity of the Donovan Islands in Vincennes Bay, off the coast of Antarctica. It was first mapped from air photos taken by U.S. Navy Operation Highjump, 1946–47, and observed in 1957 by Wilkes Station personnel under Carl R. Eklund. It was named by Eklund for Ralph Glasgal, an auroral scientist with the United States – International Geophysical Year wintering party of 1957 at Wilkes Station. In later life, Glasgal was involved in stereophonic and ambiophonic research.

== See also ==
- List of antarctic and sub-antarctic islands
