= Chappel Island =

Island in Antarctica

- Location within Antarctica

Geography
- Location: Vincennes Bay
- Coordinates: 66°11′S 110°25′E
- Archipelago: Donovan Islands

Administration
- Administered under the Antarctic Treaty System

Demographics
- Population: Uninhabited

Chappel Island is the largest of the Donovan Islands, lying about 9.3 kilometres (5 nmi) northwest of Clark Peninsula in the eastern part of Vincennes Bay. The island has a number of large Adélie penguin rookeries. It was first mapped from air photos taken by U.S. Navy Operation Highjump, 1946–47, and named by the Advisory Committee on Antarctic Names for Chief Warrant Officer R.L. Chappel, United States Marine Corps, motion picture officer on Operation Highjump photographic flights in this area and other coastal areas between 14 and 164 east longitude.

== See also ==
- Composite Antarctic Gazetteer
- List of Antarctic islands south of 60° S
- Scientific Committee on Antarctic Research
- Territorial claims in Antarctica
