= Lilienthal (surname) =

Lilienthal is a German and Jewish surname. Polish-language archaic feminine form: Lilientalowa. Notable people with the surname include:

- Alfred Lilienthal, American author
- Andor Lilienthal, Hungarian chess player
- David E. Lilienthal, (1899–1981) American public official at TVA and Atomic Energy Commission
- Gustav Lilienthal, German aviation pioneer, brother of Otto
- Max Lilienthal, Early Reform Rabbi
- Otto Lilienthal, German aviation pioneer, brother of Gustav
- Peer Lilienthal (born 1979), German politician
- Peter Lilienthal, film director
- Philip H. Lilienthal, American lawyer, camp director, and philanthropist
- Philip N. Lilienthal (1850–1908). American banker
- Regina Lilientalowa (1875-1924), Polish ethnographer, translator, and journalist
- Stanisława Dorota Liliental, birth name of Stanisława Nikodym (1897–1988), Polish mathematician and artist
