= Cronk =

Cronk may refer to:

== Geography ==
=== Isle of Man ===
- "Cronk" appears in many place names and street names on the Isle of Man, meaning "hill". For example:
  - Cronk ny Arrey Laa, the highest hill above the rugged south-west coast of the Isle of Man
  - Cronk ny Merriu, one of the remains of promontory forts in the Isle of Man
  - Cronk Urleigh on the primary A3 road in the parish of Michael in the Isle of Man
  - Cronk-ny-Mona on the Snaefell Mountain Course on the primary A18 Mountain Road in the Isle of Man
  - a fictional station in The Railway Series

=== Other places ===
- Cronk Islands, group of Antarctic islands lying northeast of Hollin Island, in the Windmill Islands

== Other uses ==
- Cronk (drink), American root beer beverage

== See also ==
- Kronk (disambiguation)
