= Schulz Point =

Coordinates: 66°17′S 110°29′E

Schulz Point is the western point of Shirley Island in the Windmill Islands. First mapped from air photos taken by U.S. Navy Operation Highjump and Operation Windmill in 1947 and 1948. Named by the Advisory Committee on Antarctic Names (US-ACAN) for Construction Mechanic Richard L. Schulz, U.S. Navy, a member of the Wilkes Station party of 1958.
