= Boving =

Boving (or typographical variants Bøving and Böving) may refer to:

- Adam Giede Böving (1869–1957), Danish-American entomologist
- Charlotte Bøving (actress) (born 1964), Danish actor and theatre director
- Charlotte Bøving (doctor) (born 1967), Danish doctor and television presenter
- William Bøving (born 2003), Danish footballer
- Bøving Island, small island in Newcomb Bay, Antarctica
