= Borrello Island =

Island in Antarctica

- Interactive map of Borrello Island

Geography
- Location: Antarctica
- Coordinates: 66°19′S 110°22′E
- Archipelago: Windmill Islands

Administration
- Administered under the Antarctic Treaty System

Demographics
- Population: Uninhabited

Borrello Island is a small Antarctic island lying off the western side of Hollin Island, in the Windmill Islands. It was first mapped from air photos taken by USN Operation Highjump and Operation Windmill in 1946 and 1947. Named by the US-ACAN for Sebastian R. Borrello, geomagnetician at Wilkes Station in 1958.

== See also ==
- Composite Antarctic Gazetteer
- List of Antarctic and sub-Antarctic islands
- List of Antarctic islands south of 60° S
- SCAR
- Territorial claims in Antarctica
