= Midgley Reefs =

The Midgley Reefs (66°20′S 110°22′E) are several tidal and submerged rocks among the islands lying off the west side of Midgley Island, in the Windmill Islands, Antarctica. They were discovered from small craft from Wilkes Station in 1961, and were named by the Antarctic Names Committee of Australia after Midgley Island.
