= Kirkby Shoal =

- Submerged bank Kirkby Shoal (Antarctica)
- Interactive map of Kirkby Shoal
- Ocean: Southern Ocean
- Archipelago: Windmill Islands
- Minimum depth: 18 m

Kirkby Shoal is a small shoal area with depths of less than 10 fathoms (18 m) extending about 150 yards (140 m) westwards and south-southwestwards, about 3.4 km (2.1 mi) from the summit of Shirley Island, Windmill Islands, and 0.15 mi (0.24 km) northwest of Stonehocker Point, Clark Peninsula.

== Discovery and naming ==
Kirkby Shoal was discovered and charted in 1962 during a hydrographic survey of Newcomb Bay and approaches by d'A.T. Gale, hydrographic surveyor with the Australian National Antarctic Research Expedition (ANARE) on the Thala Dan, led by Phillip Law. It was named by the Antarctic Names Committee of Australia after Sydney L. Kirkby, a surveyor at Mawson Station in 1956 and 1960.

== See also ==
- History of Antarctica
- List of Antarctic expeditions
