= Nye Islands =

Two small Antarctic islands

Nye Islands (66°10′S 110°25′E) are two small islands lying between Midgley Island and Pidgeon Island, in the Windmill Islands. The two islands were photographed by U.S. Navy Operation Highjump (1946–47) and U.S. Navy Operation Windmill (1947–48).Though rather clearly shown in the photography, they were not shown on the resulting charts. Named by the Advisory Committee on Antarctic Names (US-ACAN) for Harvey M. Nye, meteorological electronics technician at Wilkes Station in 1959.

== See also ==
- List of antarctic and sub-antarctic islands
