= Honkala =

Honkala may refer to:

- Cheri Honkala, US Green vice-presidential candidate in 2012
- Leo Honkala, Finnish wrestler
- Honkala Island, in Antarctica
