= Midgley Island =

Island in Antarctica

Midgley Island (66°20′S 110°24′E) is a rocky island, 0.8 nautical miles (1.5 km) long, lying immediately south of Hollin Island in the Windmill Islands of Antarctica. It was first mapped from air photos taken by U.S. Navy Operation Highjump and Operation Windmill in 1947 and 1948. The island was named by the Advisory Committee on Antarctic Names for Lieutenant E.W. Midgley, an Army Medical Corps observer who assisted Operation Windmill parties in establishing astronomical control stations between Wilhelm II Coast and Budd Coast during the 1947–48 season.

== See also ==
- List of antarctic and sub-antarctic islands
- Midgley Reefs, several tidal and submerged rocks off the west side of Midgley Island
