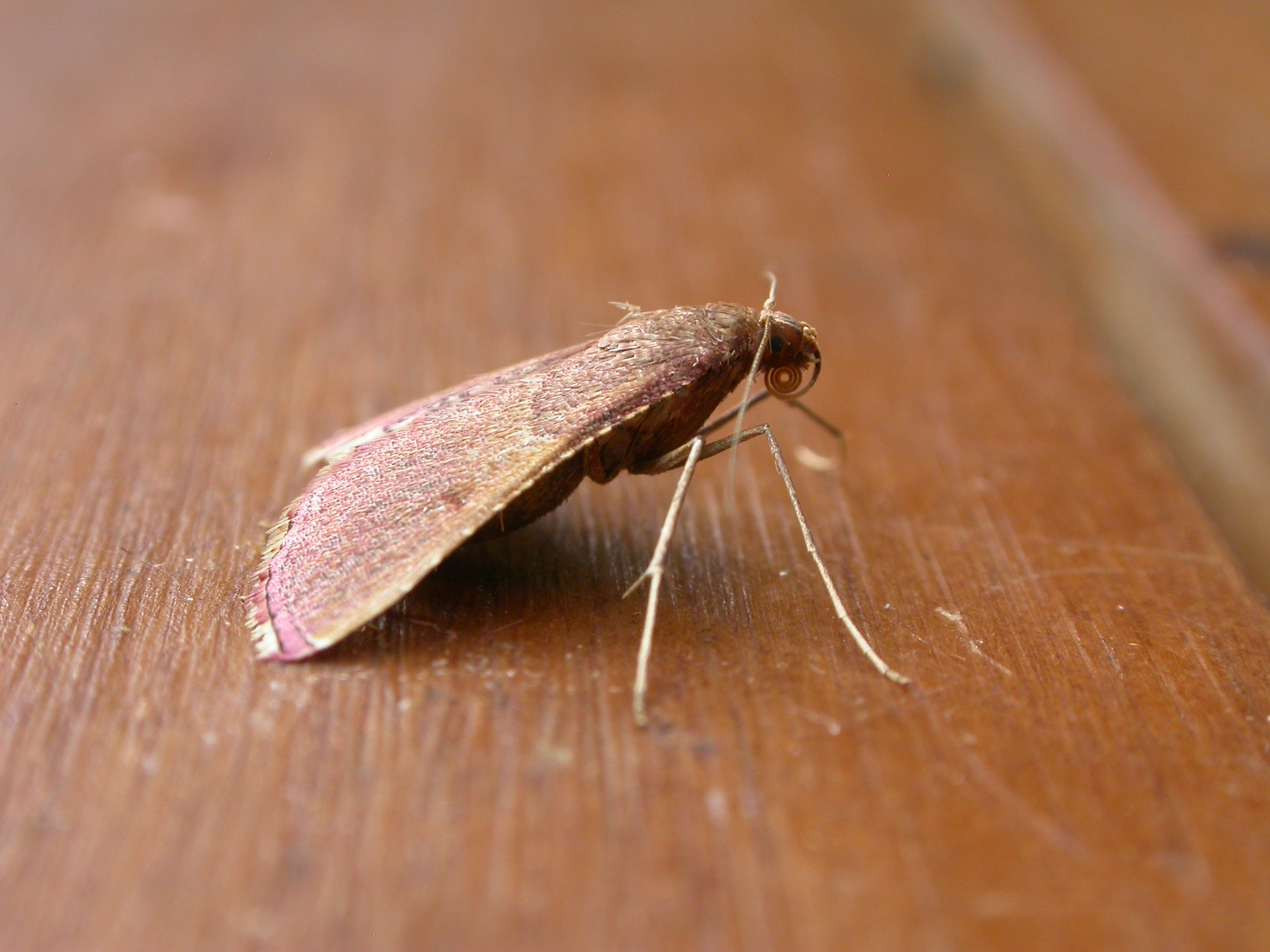

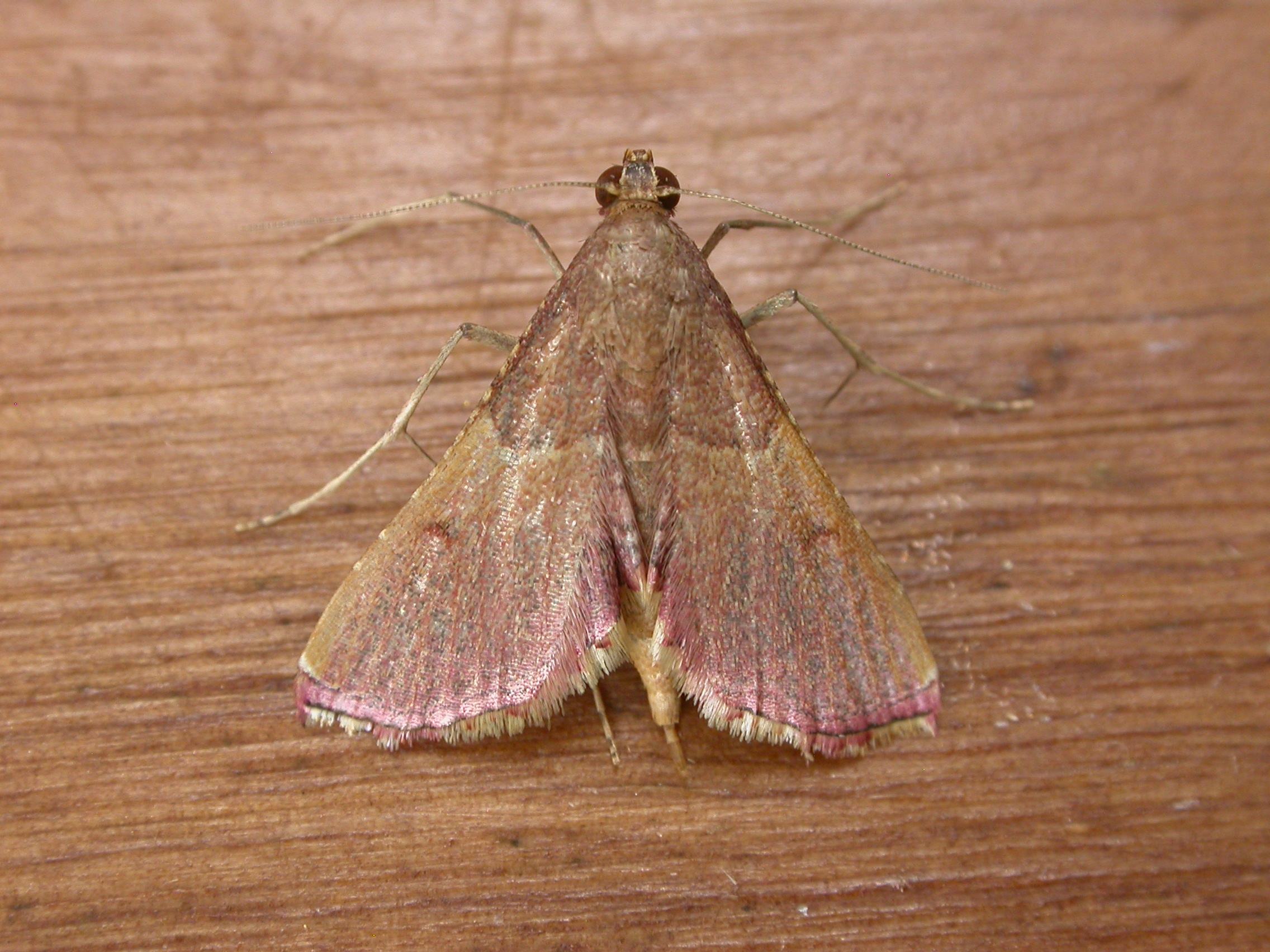

Scientific classification
- Kingdom: Animalia
- Phylum: Arthropoda
- Clade: Pancrustacea
- Class: Insecta
- Order: Lepidoptera
- Family: Pyralidae
- Genus: Endotricha
- Species: E. mesenterialis

Binomial name
- Endotricha mesenterialis (Walker, 1859)

Synonyms
- Doththa mesentrialis Walker, 1859; Endotricha flavofascialis Fryer, 1912; Endotricha mahensis Whalley, 1963; Endotricha eoidalis Snellen, 1895; Endotricha suffusalis Walker, 1859

= Endotricha mesenterialis =

Species of moth

Endotricha mesenterialis is a species of snout moth in the genus Endotricha. It was described by Francis Walker in 1859. It has a wide distribution and is known from Austral Island, Australia, the Kermadec Islands, New Caledonia, New Guinea, Palau, Samoa, Tahiti, Begum Island, Christmas Island, India, Myanmar, Indonesia (Borneo), Malaysia, the New Hebrides, the Nicobar Islands, Sri Lanka, Tonga, Taiwan and China (Guangdong, Sichuan, Zhejiang).

The winglength is about 10 mm. Adults are brownish purple, with a pale band across each wing.

== Subspecies ==
- Endotricha mesenterialis mesenterialis
- Endotricha mesenterialis mahensis Whalley, 1963 (Seychelles)
