= Molholm Shoal =

Shoal in Antarctica

Molholm Shoal (66°16′S 110°33′E) is a shoal area 0.1 nautical miles (0.2 km) west of Molholm Island in the Windmill Islands of Antarctica. Depths of less than 6 fathoms (11 m) extend for 0.2 nautical miles (0.4 km) in a north–south direction, with depths of 11 feet (3.4 m) near the south end. It was discovered and charted in February 1957 by a party from the USS Glacier, and was named by the Antarctic Names Committee of Australia after nearby Molholm Island.
