= Daniel Island (disambiguation) =

Daniel Island is an island in South Carolina, United States.

Daniel Island may also refer to:

- Daniel Island, Bermuda
- Daniel Island (Nunavut), in Canada
- Daniel Island, Antarctica
