= Holt Point =

Holt Point (66°17′S 110°30′E) is a point marking the western extremity of Bailey Peninsula, at the east side of the Windmill Islands, Antarctica. It was first mapped from air photos taken by U.S. Navy Operation Highjump, 1946–47, and was named by the Advisory Committee on Antarctic Names for photographer's mate James R. Holt, U.S. Navy, a member of the Wilkes Station party of 1958.
