= Borrelli (surname) =

Borrelli is an Italian surname.

== People with the surname ==
- David Borrelli (politician) (born 1971), Italian politician
- David Borrelli (ice hockey) (born 1981), Canadian-born Italian ice hockey player
- Enrique Borrelli (born 1962), Argentine retired footballer
- Gabriela Borrelli Azara (born 1980), Argentine writer
- Juan José Borrelli (born 1970), Argentine retired footballer
- Kathy Borrelli, Canadian politician
- Luigi Borrelli, Italian businessman and menswear brand
- Luigia Borrelli (1953–1995), Italian murder victim

== See also ==
- Borrello (surname)
