= Penicillium antarcticum =

Scientific classification
- Kingdom: Fungi
- Division: Ascomycota
- Class: Eurotiomycetes
- Order: Eurotiales
- Family: Aspergillaceae
- Genus: Penicillium
- Species: P. antarcticum

Binomial name
- Penicillium antarcticum A.D.Hocking & C.F.McRae (1999)

Type strain
- CBS 100492, DAR 72813, FRR 4989

Species of fungus

Penicillium antarcticum is an ubiquitous, endophytic fungus species of the genus Penicillium. Penicillium antarcticum produces the polyketide compounds antarone A and antarone B.

It was originally discovered on the Windmill Islands off Antarctica, thus its name.

== See also ==
- List of Penicillium species
