= Brown Bay =

Brown Bay may refer to:

- Brown Bay, U.S. Virgin Islands, a bay and former sugar cane and cotton plantation begun before 1800
- Brown Bay, Antarctica
