= Crane Cove =

Crane Cove (66°17′S 110°31′E) is a shallow cove 0.1 nautical miles (0.2 km) in extent, entered from the west between the north side of Bailey Peninsula and an unnamed island northward, on Budd Coast. Numerous low rocks almost join Bailey Peninsula and the unnamed island, forming the head of the cove and separating it from a similar cove just eastward. It was first charted in February 1957 by a party from USS Glacier. The name was suggested by Lieutenant Robert C. Newcomb, U.S. Navy, the navigator of the Glacier, after Electronics Technician Robert I. Crane, U.S. Navy, a member of the survey party.
