= Borrello (surname) =

Borrello is a surname. Notable people with the surname include:

- Brandon Borrello (born 1995), Australian footballer
- Brian Borrello, American artist
- Carlos Borrello (born 1955), Argentine football manager
- George Borrello (born 1967), American businessman and politician
- Giuseppe Borrello (1820–1894), Italian poet and patriot
- José Borello (1929–2013), Argentine footballer

== See also ==
- Borello, surname
- Borrello Island, in Antarctica
- Laureana di Borrello, municipality in Calabria, Italy
- Borrelli (surname)
