= McMullin Island =

Island in Antarctica

- Location within Antarctica

Geography
- Location: Antarctica
- Coordinates: 66°17′S 110°31′E
- Length: 0.6 km (0.37 mi)

Administration
- Administered under the Antarctic Treaty System

Demographics
- Population: Uninhabited

McMullin Island is a rocky island, 0.6 kilometres (0.3 nmi) long, lying between Shirley Island and Kilby Island in the south part of the entrance to Newcomb Bay, in the Windmill Islands, Antarctica.

It was first mapped from air photos taken by U.S. Navy Operation Highjump and Operation Windmill in 1947 and 1948, and was named by the Advisory Committee on Antarctic Names for John P. McMullin, an air crewman with Operation Windmill which established astronomical control in the area in January 1948.

== See also ==
- List of antarctic and sub-antarctic islands
