= Collins Rock =

Collins Rock (66°17′S 110°33′E) is a low rock at the south side of the entrance to McGrady Cove, Newcomb Bay, on Budd Coast in Antarctica. It was first mapped from U.S. Navy Operation Highjump aerial photographs taken in February 1947, they surveyed in February 1957 by a party from the USS Glacier. The name was suggested by Lieutenant Robert C. Newcomb, U.S. Navy, navigator of the Glacier, for Engineman Frederick A. Collins, U.S. Navy, a member of the survey party.
