= Charlotte Bøving =

Charlotte Bøving may refer to:

- Charlotte Bøving (actress) (born 1964), Danish actor and theatre director
- Charlotte Bøving (doctor) (born 1967), Danish doctor and television presenter
