= Larsen Bank =

- Submerged bank Larsen Bank (Antarctica)
- Interactive map of Larsen Bank
- Ocean: Southern Ocean
- Archipelago: Windmill Islands
- Minimum depth: 16 m

Larsen Bank is a shoal with a least depth of 16 metres (52 ft) in the northern part of Newcomb Bay, Antarctica, located 1 kilometre (0.5 nmi) north of Kilby Island in the Windmill Islands.

It was discovered and charted in February 1957 by a party from the USS Glacier (AGB-4). The bank was named by the Antarctic Names Committee of Australia for Ludvig Larsen, second mate on the Thala Dan, used by the Australian National Antarctic Research Expeditions in a 1962 survey of Newcomb Bay.
