= McGrady Cove =

Bay in Antarctica

McGrady Cove (66°16′S 110°34′E) is a cove at the head of Newcomb Bay in the Windmill Islands of Antarctica. It was first mapped from air photos taken by U.S. Navy Operation Highjump and Operation Windmill in 1947 and 1948, and was named by the Advisory Committee on Antarctic Names for Chief Photographer's Mate E.D. McGrady, U.S. Navy, who participated in the flights of Operation Highjump over the Windmill Islands in 1947.

== See also ==
- Collins Rock
