= Cameron Island, Antarctica =

Island in Antarctica

Cameron Island
- Location within Antarctica

Geography
- Location: Antarctica
- Coordinates: 66°13′S 110°36′E
- Archipelago: Swain Islands

Administration
- Administered under the Antarctic Treaty System

Demographics
- Population: Uninhabited

Cameron Island is a small island just north of Hailstorm Island, in the Swain Islands, Antarctica. This region was photographed from the air by U.S. Navy Operation Highjump (1946–47), ANARE (Australian National Antarctic Research Expeditions) (1956), and the Soviet expedition (1956). The island was included in a 1957 ground survey by C.R. Eklund, who named it for Richard L. Cameron, chief glaciologist at Wilkes Station, 1957.

== Important Bird Area ==
The island, along with neighbouring Berkley Island, the intervening sea and smaller islets, has been identified as a 97 ha Important Bird Area by BirdLife International because it supports some 14,000 pairs of breeding Adélie penguins (as estimated from January 2011 satellite imagery). It lies about 9 km east of Australia's Casey Station.

== See also ==
- List of Antarctic and sub-Antarctic islands
- Magee Rock
