= Nikodym set =

Mathematical set in measure theory

In mathematics, a Nikodym set is a subset of the unit square in $\mathbb{R}^2$ with complement of Lebesgue measure zero (i.e. with an area of 1), such that, given any point in the set, there is a straight line that only intersects the set at that point. The existence of a Nikodym set was first proved by Otto Nikodym in 1927. Subsequently, constructions were found of Nikodym sets having continuum many exceptional lines for each point, and Kenneth Falconer found analogues in higher dimensions.

Nikodym sets are closely related to Kakeya sets (also known as Besicovitch sets).

The existence of Nikodym sets is sometimes compared with the Banach–Tarski paradox. There is, however, an important difference between the two: the Banach–Tarski paradox relies on non-measurable sets.

Mathematicians have also researched Nikodym sets over finite fields (as opposed to $\mathbb{R}$).
