= Honkala Island =

Island in Antarctica

- Location within Antarctica

Geography
- Location: Antarctica
- Coordinates: 66°14′S 110°37′E
- Length: 1.4 km (0.87 mi)

Administration
- Administered under the Antarctic Treaty System

Demographics
- Population: Uninhabited

Honkala Island is a rocky island, 1.4 kilometres (0.75 nmi) long, at the southeast side of Burnett Island, in the Swain Islands of Antarctica. It was first mapped from air photos taken by U.S. Navy Operation Highjump, 1946–47, and observed by Wilkes Station personnel who conducted a 1957 survey of the Swain Islands under Carl R. Eklund. It was named by Eklund for Rudolf A. Honkala, chief meteorologist with the United States International Geophysical Year wintering party of 1957 at Wilkes Station.

== See also ==
- Green Rocks
- List of antarctic and sub-antarctic islands
