= Beall Island =

Island of Antarctica

- Location within Antarctica

Geography
- Location: Antarctica
- Coordinates: 66°18′S 110°29′E
- Archipelago: Windmill Islands
- Length: 2 km (1.2 mi)
- Width: 1.5 km (0.93 mi)
- Highest elevation: 48 m (157 ft)

Administration
- Administered under the Antarctic Treaty System

Demographics
- Population: Uninhabited

Beall Island is a rocky island with small coves indenting the eastern and western sides, lying 600 m (660 yd) south-west of the Bailey Peninsula, in the Windmill Islands on the Budd Coast of Antarctica. There are several small lakes on the island. It was first mapped from aerial photos taken by the USN's Operation Highjump and Operation Windmill in 1947 and 1948. It was named by the US-ACAN for James M. Beall, U.S. Weather Bureau observer with Operation Windmill who assisted staff aerology officers with forecasting duties. The Beall Reefs are submarine ridges with depths of less than 1.8 metres (1 fathom), located 1 kilometre (0.6 mi) west of the island; they were discovered at the establishment of Wilkes Station in 1961 and named by ANCA after the island. Connors Point is the north-western point of the island; it was named by the US-ACAN for Aerographer's Mate William J. Connors, USN, a member of the Wilkes Station party of 1958.

== Important Bird Area ==
A 414 ha site comprising both Beall Island and neighbouring Shirley Island, as well as the intervening marine area, has been designated an Important Bird Area (IBA) by BirdLife International because it supports breeding colonies of about 14,000 pairs of Adélie penguins, based on 2011 satellite imagery. Other birds breeding in the IBA include snow petrels, Wilson's storm petrels and south polar skuas.

== See also ==
- Composite Antarctic Gazetteer
- List of Antarctic and Subantarctic islands
- List of Antarctic islands south of 60° S
- SCAR
- Territorial claims in Antarctica
