= Borello =

Borello is an Italian surname. Notable people with the surname include:

- Giuseppe Borello (born 1999), Italian footballer
- Fernando Borello (born 1980), Argentine sports shooter
- Francesco Borello (1902–1979), Italian footballer
- José Borello (1929–2013), Argentine footballer

== See also ==
- Borrello, town in Abruzzo, Italy
- Borrello (surname)
