= Otto M. Nikodym =

Polish mathematician (1887-1974)

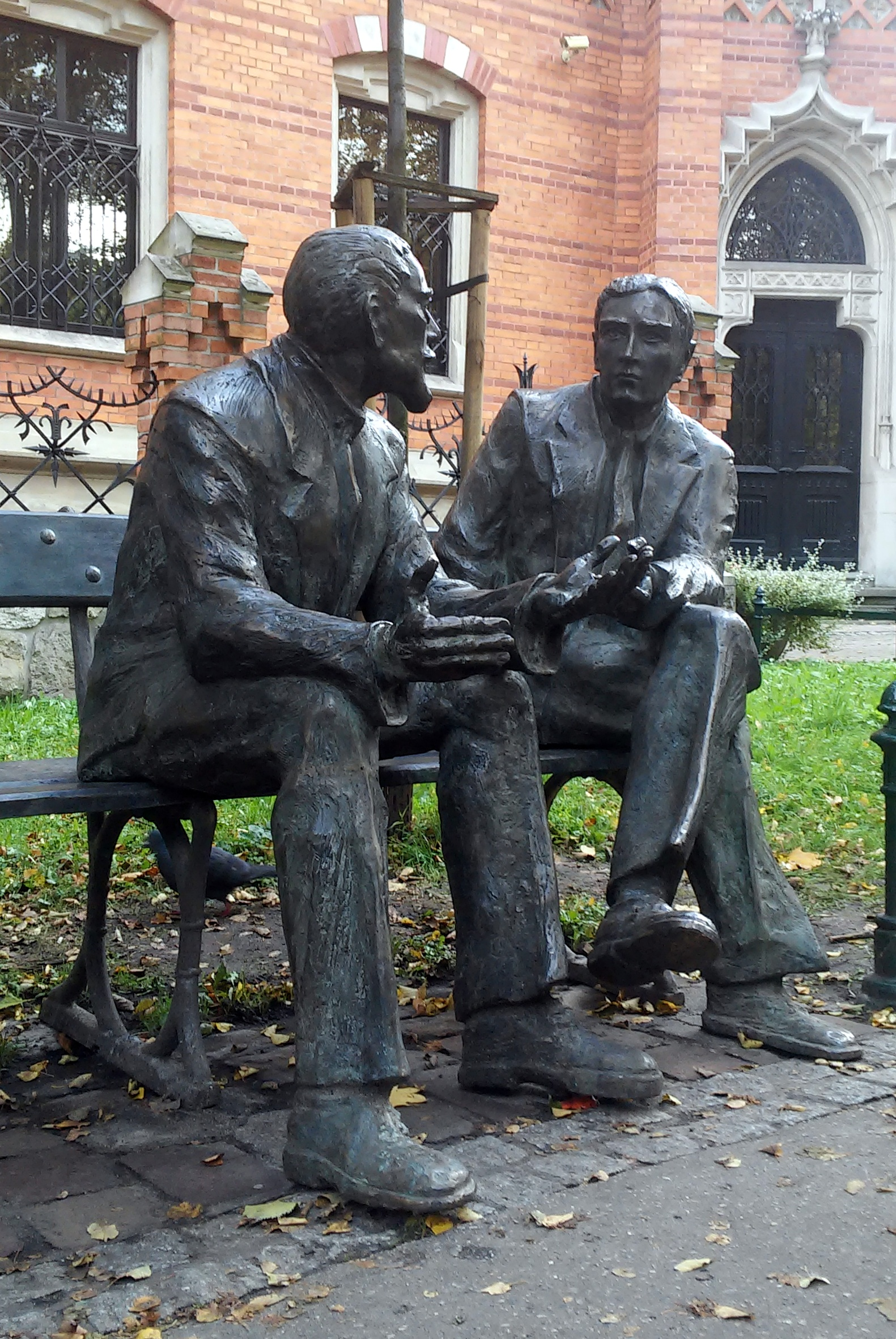
- Otto Nikodym and Stefan Banach Memorial Bench in Kraków, Poland (sculpted by Stefan Dousa)
- Born: 3 August 1887; Zabolotiv, Galicia
- Died: 4 May 1974 (aged 86); Utica, New York, United States
- Education: University of Lviv; University of Warsaw
- Known for: Nikodym set Radon–Nikodym theorem Radon–Nikodym property Radon-Nikodym set
- Spouse: Stanisława Nikodym
- Scientific career
- Fields: Mathematics
- Institutions: Jagiellonian University; University of Warsaw; Akademia Górnicza; Kenyon College
- Academic advisors: Wacław Sierpiński; Marian Smoluchowski

Otto Marcin Nikodym (3 August 1887 – 4 May 1974) (also Otton Martin Nikodým) was a Polish mathematician. He contributed mainly to the areas of measure theory, functional analysis, differential equations and descriptive set theory. In 1919, he was among the founders of the Polish Mathematical Society.

== Education and career ==
Nikodym studied mathematics at the University of Lemberg (today's University of Lviv). Immediately after his graduation in 1911, he started his teaching job at a high school in Kraków where he remained until 1924. He eventually obtained his doctorate in 1925 from the University of Warsaw; he also spent an academic year (1926-1927) in Sorbonne. Nikodym taught at the Jagiellonian University in Kraków and University of Warsaw and at the Akademia Górnicza in Kraków in the years that followed. He moved to the United States in 1948 and joined the faculty of Kenyon College. He retired in 1966 and moved to Utica, New York, where he continued his research until his death.

== Personal life ==
Nikodym was born in 1887 in Demycze, a suburb of Zabłotów (in modern-day Ukraine), to a family with Polish, Czech, Italian and French roots. Orphaned at a young age, he was brought up by his maternal grandparents. In 1924, he married Stanisława Nikodym, the first Polish woman to obtain a PhD in mathematics.

== Research works ==
Nikodym worked in a wide range of areas, but his best-known early work was his contribution to the development of the Lebesgue–Radon–Nikodym integral (see Radon–Nikodym theorem). His work in measure theory led him to an interest in abstract Boolean lattices. His work after coming to the United States centered on the theory of operators in Hilbert space, based on Boolean lattices, culminating in his The Mathematical Apparatus for Quantum-Theories. He was also interested in the teaching of mathematics.

== See also ==
- Nikodym set
- Radon–Nikodym theorem
- Radon–Nikodym property of a Banach space
- List of Polish mathematicians
