= Eklund Islands =

Island group in Palmer Land, Antarctica

The Eklund Islands (73°16′S 71°50′W) are a group of islands which rise through the ice near the southwest end of George VI Sound towards the south of the Antarctic Peninsula.

The largest island, 5 nautical miles (9 km) in extent and rising to 410 metres (1,350 ft), was discovered in December 1940 by Finn Ronne and Carl R. Eklund of the United States Antarctic Service during their 1,097-mile (1,765 km) sledge journey south from Stonington Island to the southwest part of George VI Sound and return. At that time this large island, named by Ronne for Eklund, the ornithologist and assistant biologist of the expedition, was the only land protruding above an area of hummocky ice. V. E. Fuchs and R. J. Adie of the Falkland Islands Dependencies Survey sledged to the southwest part of George VI Sound in 1949, at which time, because of a recession of the ice in the sound, they were able to determine that the island discovered by Ronne and Eklund is the largest of a group of mainly ice-covered islands. On the basis of the original discovery, the Advisory Committee on Antarctic Names recommends that the name Eklund be applied to the island group rather than the single island discovered by Ronne and Eklund.
