= Laurence C. Eklund =

American journalist

Laurence Conrad Eklund (May 16, 1905 – June 20, 2002) was an American journalist and long time head of the Washington bureau for the Milwaukee Journal.

He was born in Tomahawk, Wisconsin. His father was an immigrant from Sweden. His brother was antarctic explorer and scientist Carl R. Eklund. After graduation from Tomahawk High School, he went to the University of Wisconsin-Madison. He was an associate editor of The Daily Cardinal and was elected to the Iron Cross Society. He graduated in 1927 with a degree in journalism. He worked at the Journal for 43 years, which included the position of Washington bureau chief from 1947 to 1970. In 1975 he received knighthood in the Royal Order of the Polar Star from the government of Sweden. In 1990 he was inducted into the Milwaukee Press Club Hall of Fame. He was member of the National Press Club and the Gridiron Club.

He was married 53 years to Ethel, who died in 1982. Laurence died in Bethesda, Maryland at the age of 97. He was survived by a son John.
