= Brown Bay, Antarctica =

Bay in Antarctica

Brown Bay (66°17′S 110°33′E) is a cove just to the southeast of Casey Station on Bailey Peninsula, Budd Coast. It was photographed by U.S. Navy Operation Highjump, 1946–47, the Soviet Antarctic Expedition, 1956, and the Australian National Antarctic Research Expeditions, 1956. It was named by the Antarctic Names Committee of Australia for A.M. Brown, senior engineer with the Antarctic Division, Melbourne, a member of the team which planned and supervised the construction of Casey Station.
