= Shirley Island =

Island of Antarctica

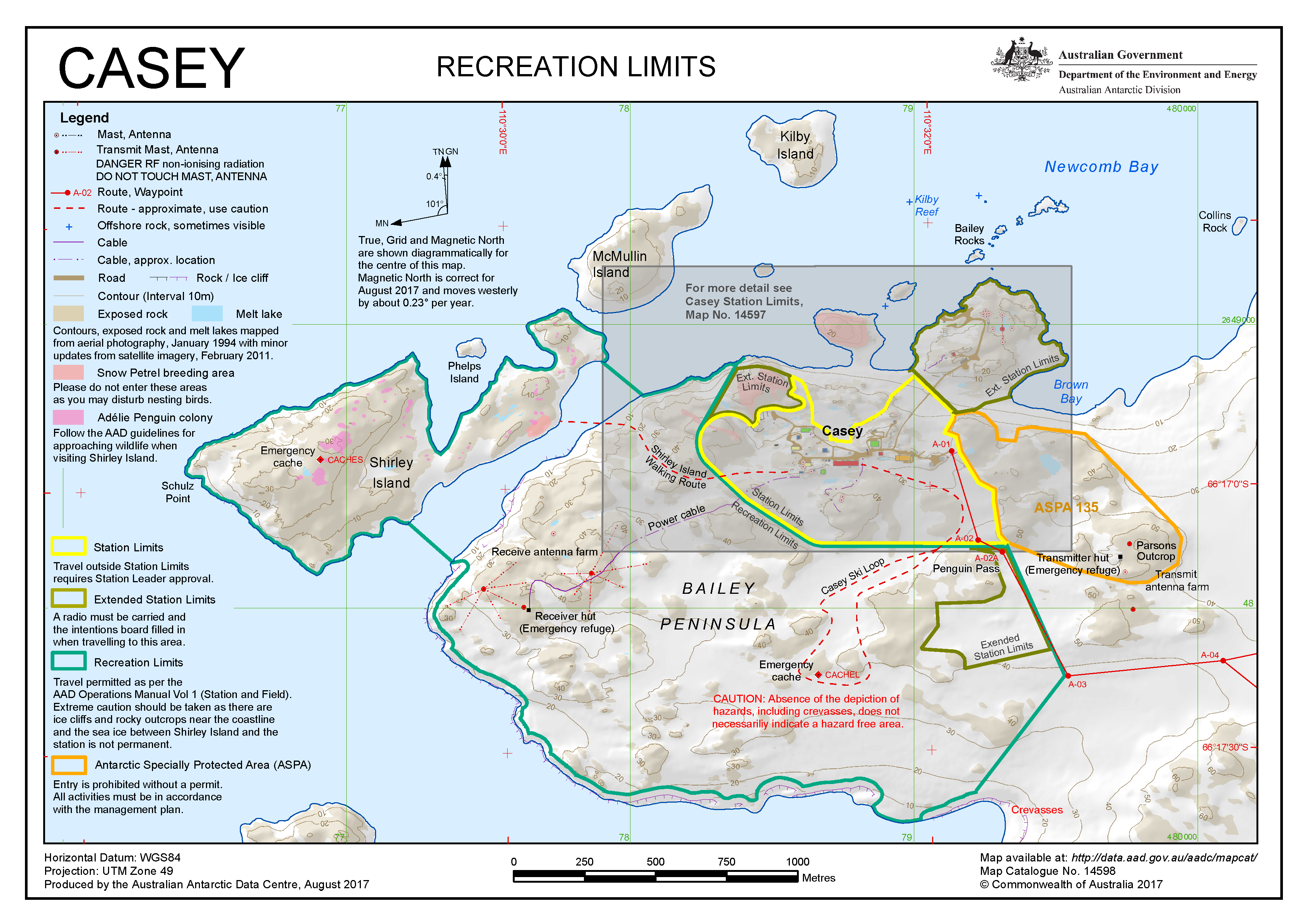
- Location off Bailey Peninsula

- Location in Antarctica

Geography
- Location: Antarctica
- Coordinates: 66°17′S 110°30′E
- Archipelago: Windmill Islands
- Length: 1.5 km (0.93 mi)
- Width: 0.5 km (0.31 mi)
- Highest elevation: 37 m (121 ft)

Administration
- Administered under the Antarctic Treaty System

Demographics
- Population: Uninhabited

Shirley Island is a rocky island lying 200 m (220 yd) north-west of the western end of the Bailey Peninsula, in the Windmill Islands of the Budd Coast, Wilkes Land, Antarctica. It is mostly ice-free with undulating, rocky terrain. It was first mapped from aerial photos taken by the USN's Operation Highjump in February 1947. It was named by the US-ACAN for Q. Shirley, chief photographer's mate on Operation Highjump photographic flights in coastal areas between 14° and 164° E longitude. Kirkby Shoal is a small shoal area with depths of less than 18 meters (59 ft) extending about 140 meters (459 ft) westwards and south-south-west, about 3.4 km (2.1 mi) from the summit of Shirley Island. Launch Channel is the narrow body of water between Bailey Peninsula and the island; with the relatively shallow soundings in the channel restricting its use to smaller craft and suggesting the name.

== Important Bird Area ==
A 414 ha site comprising both Shirley Island and neighbouring Beall Island, as well as the intervening marine area, has been designated an Important Bird Area (IBA) by BirdLife International because it supports breeding colonies of about 14,000 pairs of Adélie penguins, based on 2011 satellite imagery. Other birds breeding in the IBA include snow petrels, Wilson's storm petrels and south polar skuas.

== See also ==
- Composite Antarctic Gazetteer
- List of Antarctic and Subantarctic islands
- List of Antarctic islands south of 60° S
- Schulz Point
- SCAR
- Territorial claims in Antarctica
