= Burnett Island =

Island in the Swain Islands, Antarctica

- Location within Antarctica

Geography
- Coordinates: 66°13′S 110°36′E
- Archipelago: Swain Islands
- Length: 1.9 km (1.18 mi)

Administration
- Administered under the Antarctic Treaty System

Demographics
- Population: Uninhabited

Burnett Island in the Antarctic (66°13′S 110°36′E) is a rocky island, 1.9 kilometres (1 nmi) long in an east–west direction, which lies north of Honkala Island and is the central feature in the Swain Islands. First photographed from the air by U.S. Navy Operation Highjump, 1946–47, it was included in a 1957 survey of the Swain Islands by Wilkes Station personnel under Carl R. Eklund. It was named by Eklund for Lieutenant (j.g.) Donald Burnett, U.S. Navy, Military Support Unit Commander of the 1957 wintering party at Wilkes Station during the International Geophysical Year.

== See also ==
- Composite Antarctic Gazetteer
- List of Antarctic islands south of 60° S
- Scientific Committee on Antarctic Research
- Territorial claims in Antarctica
