= Kilby Island =

Island in Antarctica

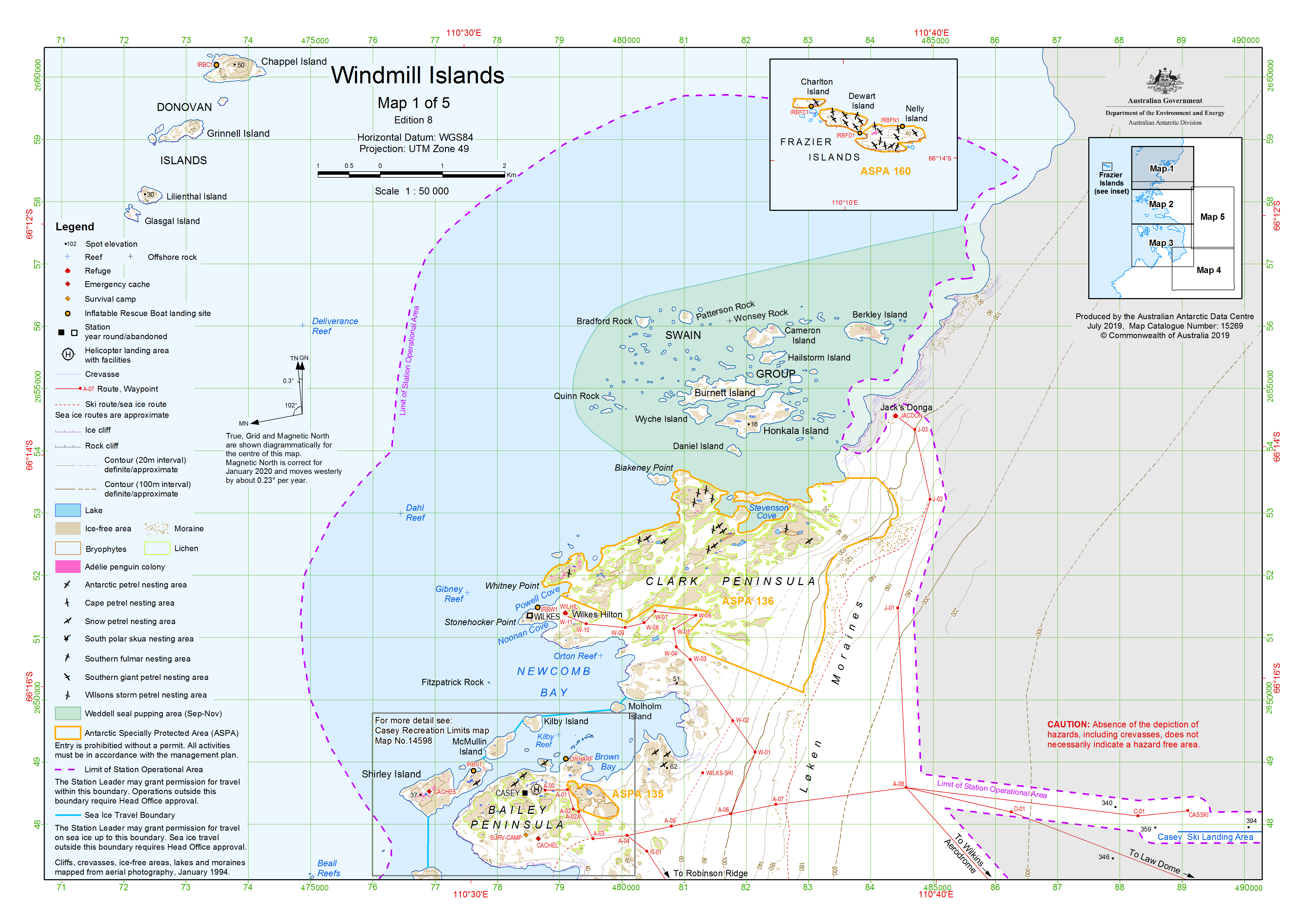
- Kilby Island is located off the Bailey Peninsula

- Location in Antarctica

Geography
- Location: Antarctica
- Coordinates: 66°16′S 110°31′E
- Archipelago: Windmill Islands

Administration
- Administered under the Antarctic Treaty System

Demographics
- Population: Uninhabited

Kilby Island is a rocky Antarctic island, 0.37 kilometres (0.2 nmi) long, lying northeast of McMullin Island in the entrance of Newcomb Bay, in the Windmill Islands. It was first mapped from air photos taken by USN Operation Highjump and Operation Windmill in 1947 and 1948. It was named by the US-ACAN for Arthur L. Kilby, who served as photographer with both operations.

== Kilby Reef ==
Kilby Reef is a small, isolated reef, which uncovers at low water, lying 0.28 kilometres (0.15 nmi) southeast of the island. It was first charted in February 1957 by a survey party led by Lt. R. C. Newcomb, USN, of the USS Glacier. Recharted by ANARE in 1962, during a hydrographic survey of Newcomb Bay by d'A. T. Gale, and then named after Kilby Island.

== See also ==
- Composite Antarctic Gazetteer
- List of Antarctic and sub-Antarctic islands
- List of Antarctic islands south of 60° S
- SCAR
- Territorial claims in Antarctica
