= Hollin Island =

Island in Antarctica

- Location within Antarctica

Geography
- Location: Antarctica
- Coordinates: 66°19′S 110°24′E
- Archipelago: Windmill Islands
- Length: 2 km (1.2 mi)

Administration
- Administered under the Antarctic Treaty System

Demographics
- Population: Uninhabited

Hollin Island is an Antarctic island about 1.9 kilometres (1 nmi) long, lying north of Midgley Island, in the Windmill Islands. It was first mapped from air photos taken by USN Operation Highjump in 1946 and 1947. It was named by the US-ACAN for John T. Hollin, glaciologist at Wilkes Station in 1958.

== See also ==
- Composite Antarctic Gazetteer
- List of Antarctic and sub-Antarctic islands
- List of Antarctic islands south of 60° S
- SCAR
- Territorial claims in Antarctica
