= Stanisława Nikodym =

Polish mathematician (1897–1988)

- Stanisława Liliental as a student at Warsaw University, 1916
- Born: Stanisława Dorota Liliental; July 2, 1897; Warsaw, Poland
- Died: March 25, 1988 (aged 90); Jeżewo Stare, Poland, her grave is in Tykocin
- Citizenship: United States
- Education: Warsaw University
- Spouse: Otto M. Nikodym
- Scientific career
- Fields: continuum theory
- Workplaces: Warsaw Polytechnic, Kenyon College
- Thesis: O rozcinaniu płaszczyźny przez zbiory spójne i kontinua (1925)
- Doctoral advisor: Stefan Mazurkiewicz

Stanisława Nikodym (née Liliental; 2 July 1897 – 25 March 1988) was a Polish mathematician and artist. She is known for her results in continuum theory, especially on Jordanian continuums.

== Life ==
Stanisława Dorota Liliental was born in Warsaw to Regina Lilientalowa, an ethnographer, and Nathan Liliental. Stanisława had a younger brother, Antoni (born 1908). She attended Helena Skłodowska-Szalay's primary school, and went to Warsaw's private school for women for 7 years. She joined the Warsaw University in 1916, reading mathematics under Stefan Mazurkiewicz, Zygmunt Janiszewski, and Wacław Sierpiński

She married Otto M. Nikodym, a mathematician, in 1924, and joined him at Kraków. Supervised by Mazurkiewicz, she was awarded a doctoral degree from the Jagiellonian University in 1925. She was the first woman in Poland to obtain a PhD in mathematics.

Receiving government funding to study in Paris, she and Otto attended the Sorbonne for two years from 1926. In 1930, they returned to Warsaw. She took up a job at the Warsaw Polytechnic, working with Franciszek Leja till 1936, when he left for Kraków.

Her brother, Antoni, a chemist and officer in the Polish army, was murdered by Russians during the Katyn Massacre in 1940. Under the German Nazi occupation of Poland, unnecessary occupations, including higher education, were suppressed. The Nikodyms conducted clandestine classes in mathematics despite the danger of punishment. In 1944's Warsaw Uprising, she and her husband lost their possessions, including several unpublished mathematical works. They moved to Belgium for a congress of mathematicians in 1946, and Otto gave lectures in various European cities, before they emigrated to the United States, settling in Gambier, Ohio.

After her husband's death in 1974, she donated their papers and her paintings to the Briscoe Center for American History at the University of Texas, Austin. Stanisława Nikodym died in Warsaw in 1988.

== Career ==
=== Mathematics ===
While on leave from university in 1918–1919, Stanisława taught mathematics to soldiers in the Polish army.

Her doctoral thesis was titled On disconnecting the plane by connected sets and continua. She published three books and several articles before World War II broke out.

Among her findings were necessary and sufficient conditions for a subcontinuum of a Jordanian continuum to be Jordanian. She also established that if the intersection and union of two closed sets are Jordanian continua, then so are the sets themselves.

In the 1940s, she taught mathematics at Kenyon College in Gambier, Ohio, where her husband was also a member of the faculty.

=== Art ===
As a student, Liliental participated in open-air painting in Sandomierz. She painted the cityscape several times in watercolour over many years in the inter-war period from 1922. The resulting works were presented at an exhibition in 1933, after which she donated them to the District Museum in Sandomierz, where they remain to this day.

== Selected works ==
- Nikodym, Stanisława (1925). "Sur les coupures du plan faites par les ensembles connexes et les continus". Fundamenta Mathematicae. 7: 15–23. doi:10.4064/fm-7-1-15-23.
- Nikodym, Otto; Nikodym, Stanisława (1936). Wstęp do rachunku rózniczkowego (in Polish). Warsaw: Nasza Księgarnia.
- Nikodym, Stanisława (1948). Wzory i krótkie repetytorium matematyki. Poznań: Księgarnia W. Wilka.
- Nikodym, Otto; Nikodym, Stanisława (1954). "Sur l'extension des corps algébriques abstraits par un procédé généralisé de Cantor". Rendiconti dell'Accademia Nazionale dei Lincei (Classe di Scienze Fisiche, Matematiche e Naturali). 8. 17.
- Nikodym, Otto; Nikodym, Stanisława (1957). "Some theorems on divisibility of infinite cardinals". Archiv der Mathematik. 8 (2): 96–103. doi:10.1007/BF01900432. S2CID 115982796.

== Bibliography ==
- Ciesielska, Danuta (2018). "A mathematician and a painter Stanisława Nikodym and her husband Otton Nikodym". In Kjeldsen, T.H.; Oswald, N.; Tobies, R. (eds.). Women in Mathematics: Historical and Modern Perspectives. Mathematisches Forschungsinstitut Oberwolfach. doi:10.4171/OWR/2017/2.
- Domoradzki, Stanisław; Stawiska, Małgorzata (November 2019). "Polish mathematicians and mathematics in World War I. Part II. Russian Empire". Studia Historiae Scientiarum. 18: 55–92. arXiv:1804.02448. doi:10.4467/2543702xshs.19.004.11010.
- Piotrowski, Walerian (2014). "Jeszcze w sprawie biografii Ottona i Stanisławy Nikodymów". Wiadomości Matematyczne (in Polish). 50 (1).
- Stamp, Tom (1995). "Let Us Now Praise Not-So-Famous Women". Kenyon College Alumni Bulletin (Spring).
- Szymanski, Waclaw (1990). "Who Was Otto Nikodym?". Mathematical Intelligencer. 12 (2).
