= Luigi Borrelli =

- Type: Private
- Industry: Fashion (menswear)
- Founded: 1957; 69 years ago Naples, Italy
- Founder: Luigi Borrelli
- Headquarters: Naples, Italy
- Area served: International boutiques: Forte dei Marmi,
- Products: Classic Italian suits

Luigi Borrelli is an Italian menswear brand from Naples, Italy. Luigi Borrelli started the company in 1957 after learning the tailoring from his mother, Anna Borrelli.

Luigi Borrelli has flagship stores in: Milan, Rome, Bari, and Napoli.

== See also ==
- Italian fashion
- Made in Italy
