= Regina Lilientalowa =

Polish ethnographer, translator, and journalist

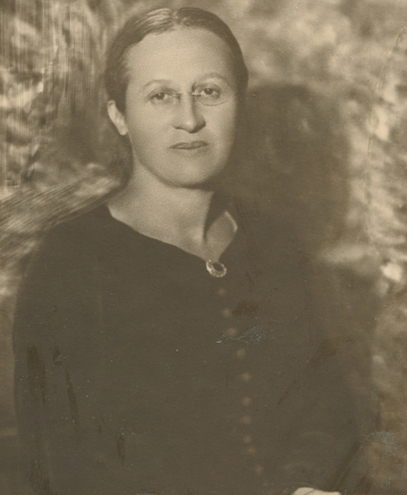
- Born: Gitla Eiger; 24 November 1875; Zawichost, Poland
- Died: 4 December 1924 (aged 49); Warsaw
- Citizenship: Polish
- Occupations: Ethnographer, folklorist, translator
- Children: Stanisława Nikodym Antoni Liliental

Regina Lilientalowa, born Gitla née Eiger; 24 November 1875 in Zawichost – 4 December 1924 in Warsaw). She was a Polish ethnographer, translator, and journalist of Jewish origin. She is known for her pioneering research on Jewish folk rituals and literature.

== Life ==
Gitla Eiger was born to Moses and Bluma Fayga née Halpern, in a traditional family of moderately Polonized Jews, descendants of rabbi Akiva Eiger (1761–1837), in Zawichost, at the time a part of the Russian Empire. She attended school at Sandomierz. After her marriage to Nathan Liliental in 1896 in the Synagogue in Szczebrzeszyn, she moved to Warsaw.

Lilientalowa had three children: Stanisława (born 1897), Jan (who lived only for seven months in 1900), and Antoni (born 1908). Stanisława became a mathematician, while Antoni joined the Polish army and was killed in the Katyn Massacre.

Lilientalowa died on 4 December 1924 from a failed operation in Warsaw.

== Career ==
Lilientalowa wanted to pursue higher studies in Warsaw which was difficult for women, especially those from a Jewish background. She began to attend the so-called Flying University, which organized courses for women in secret, while educating herself privately in Jewish folklore. Under Ludwik Krzywicki, she expanded her knowledge of Jewish rituals and folk literature and began to publish in Poland's leading journals of anthropology, Wisła, and Lud. To earn a living, she taught writing in Yiddish and arithmetics at a cheder in Piaseczno (1903/1904), where she also conducted field study for her book The Jewish Child (1904). Later, in Warsaw, she taught Jewish history at schools for Jewish girls until 1923, with Polish as the main language of instruction

Lilientalowa published her first ethnographic works Przesady żydowskie (Jewish superstitions, 1898); Zaręczyny i wesele żydowskie (Jewish betrothal and wedding, 1900); Wierzenia, przesady i praktyki ludu żydowskiego (Beliefs, Superstitions and Practices of the Jews, 1904–1905).

Her focus shifted from contemporary Jewish culture to historical customs and rituals, which she studied from German and Russian translations and the Yiddish Talmud. Later Lilientalowa learned Hebrew and Aramaic to delve deeper into Talmudic traditions, resulting in two well-received books, Dziecko żydowskie (The Jewish Child, 1904, and the second part of The Jewish Child published in 1927, after her death). Święta żydowskie w przeszłości i teraźniejszości (Jewish Holidays, in the Past and Present, 1909—1918) was published by the Academy of Learning (Akademia Umiejętności) in Krakow.

Her work included considerable material from Lublin, Zawichost, and Radomski field investigations. She demonstrated the evolution of the rites of the leading Jewish pilgrimage days (Pesach, Sabbath, and Sukkoth), the religious holidays of Rosh Hashanah and Yom Kippur, and Hanukkah and Purim, which she linked to events associated with nature.

Lilientalowa's interest in Jewish folklore led her to translate I. L. Peretz's Yiddish stories into the Polish language. These were published between 1901 and 1910. She translated Yiddish folk songs from the collections of Saul Ginzberg and Peter Marek. She also published her translations of women's tkhines prayers, focusing on their moral, magical, and healing properties.

== Selected works ==
- "Przesądy żydowskie". Wisła. XII: 277–284. 1898.
- "Przesądy żydowskie". Wisła. XIV: 369–644. 1900.
- "Wierzenia, przesądy i praktyki ludu żydowskiego" [Beliefs, superstitions and practices of the Jewish people]. Wisła. XIX: 148–176. 1905.
- "Kult ciał niebieskich u starożytnych Hebrajczyków i szczątki tego kultu u współczesnego ludu żydowskiego" [The cult of heavenly bodies among ancient Hebrews]. Archiwum Nauk Antropologicznych. I (6). 1921.
- "Ajn-hore". Jidisze Filologie. 4–6: 245–271. 1924.
- Dziecko żydowskie. Warsaw: Midrasz. 2007.
