= Cronk (drink) =

American root beer drink

Dr. Cronk's Compound Sarsaparilla Beer, or simply Cronk, was an American flavoured small beer made with sassafras, sarsaparilla, ginger, green tea and molasses; believed to have had a taste resembling "spicy root beer."

Attributed to one Warren Cronk, it first appears in records in 1840 in Syracuse, New York, and is believed to have been franchised and sold in the 19th century in the United States and Canada.

The "long-lost" Compound Sarsaparilla Beer's recipe was re-discovered in June 2020 after Cronk attracted heightened interest and trended on Twitter. Breweries in Calgary and Ottawa released versions of Cronk later in the year. Modern-day Cronk brews have been described as having a taste resembling a light herbal liqueur.

== Background ==
Warren Cronk of New York City (but based in Albany and Auburn, New York in the 1840s) is attributed as having invented the beverage. The Compound Sarsaparilla Beer was considered a "temperance" drink, but it is not clear whether the drink was sold with or without an alcohol content. As a flavoured beer (like the root beer and sarsaparilla of the time), it still needed to be brewed. Due to this the finished product may have been alcoholic if not this was not distilled out, albeit with a relatively low alcohol content for the time—which also made it a 'small beer.'

I am prepared to say, that no medicine compounded within my knowledge, not to say Beer, contains more valuable ingredients—their nature is such as to come truly within the term: remedies.

—Warren Cronk; Syracuse Daily Star; June 5, 1846; Syracuse, NY

Cronk was advertised as having medicinal properties, as sarsaparilla—one of its ingredients—was believed at the time to be medicinal. The beer rose to become a cultural phenomenon and a status symbol for the affluent public.

=== Franchising ===
The rights to produce, bottle, and sell his beer in certain territories was sold by Warren Cronk to various bottling partners. Cronk was distributed through a "franchised bottling system," which meant that it was sold throughout wide areas in Northeastern United States and Canada.

On the influence of Cronk, Thomas Kanalley wrote in the December 2010 newsletter of the Federation of Historical Bottle Collectors, "I don't know if it will ever be possible to trace all the cities and the influence that Warren Cronk has had with his 'Compound Sarsaparilla Beer'."

=== Decline ===
Cronk is presumed to have declined in one of the various depressions that hit North America in the 19th century, as with most other companies in the soda business at the time. Another theory is that its franchise system may have resulted in its end as it lost popularity over time. References to Cronk have not been found later than the 1910s and '20s.

=== In legal records ===
The Compound Sarsaparilla Beer was the subject of a court case in Ontario, Canada in the 1880s on whether it was alcoholic or not, during a period of Canadian Prohibition.

== Modern-day revival ==
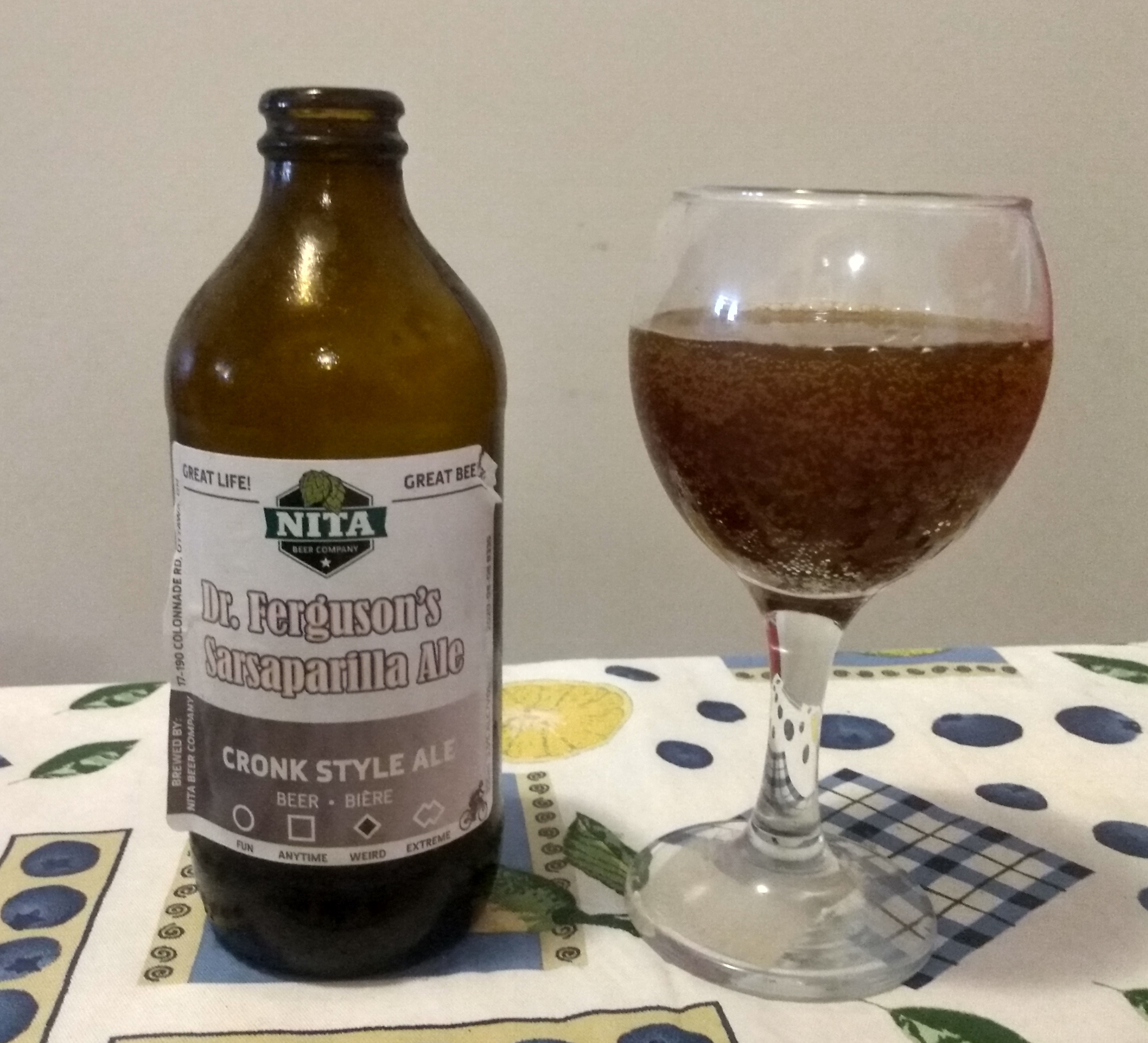
Dr. Ferguson's Sarsaparilla Ale by Nita Beer in Ottawa was one of the numerous attempts at reviving Cronk by breweries in Canada.

Cronk attracted revived interest and its recipe was re-discovered in June 2020 when newspaper advertisements for the beverage from the 1880s were shared on Twitter by Paul Fairie, a researcher at the University of Calgary. The "bizarre" adverts attracted interest and came to trend on Twitter in Canada.

A recipe for Cronk from 1860 was uncovered in the Hand Book of Practical Receipts; Or, Useful Hints in Every Day Life by a commenter in the aforementioned Twitter thread, which listed sassafras, sarsaparilla, hops, chamomile, cinnamon, ginger, green tea, and molasses as ingredients.

Other documents found referred to the ornate and collectible bottles used for Cronk, and legal cases concerning whether it was an alcoholic drink.

=== Production ===
The Cold Garden Beverage Company, a micro-brewery in Calgary, Canada, began experimenting with brewing the beverage in late June 2020. Blake Belding, a brewer at Cold Garden, opined that the Cronk recipe will "taste like a spicy root beer." On August 19, 2020, the company released an initial batch of 1800 bottles of Cronk.

At nearly the same time, the Nita Beer Company, of Ottawa, Canada, was one to also try to revive Cronk. It was named 'Dr. Ferguson's Sarsaparilla Ale', and lauded by a customer for its strong "molasses and cinnamon flavours". There are plans to have a second run after tweaking the recipe to make a more balanced beverage.

The Cold Garden rendition of the Cronk recipe replaced sassafras—which is now prohibited from food and drinks—with mint and burdock root amongst others to emulate the former's flavour. Trevor Cox, of Cold Garden, said it resembled a diluted and carbonated herbal liqueur. Nita considered his Cronk rendition to taste like a "botanical-blend", which, "gave herbal, almost medicinal, characteristics to the drink." Cox and Nita both likened the tastes of their final products to the popular herbal digestif Jägermeister's.
