= Peer Lilienthal =

German politician (born 1979)

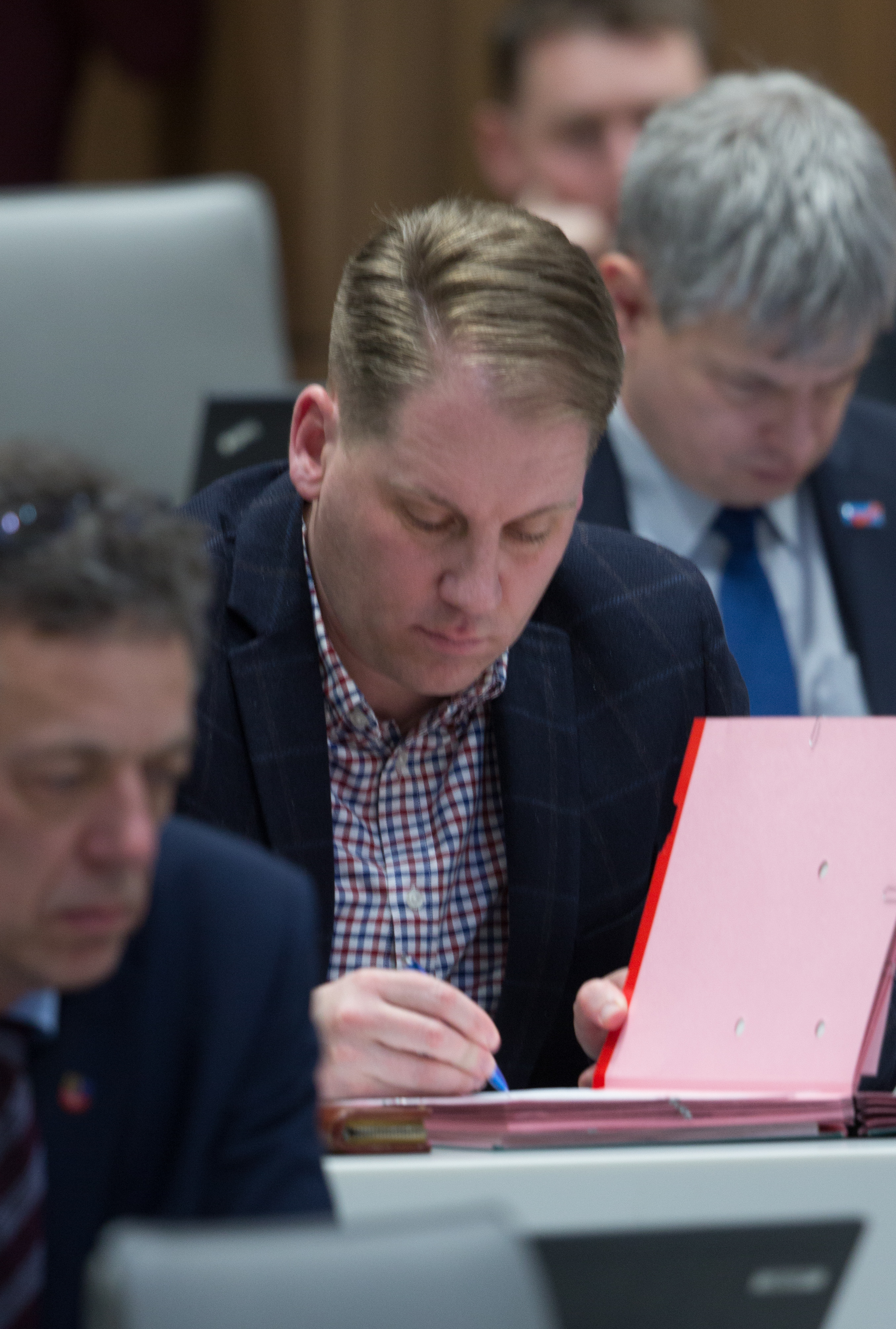
- Lilienthal in 2018

Member of the Landtag of Lower Saxony
- Incumbent
- Assumed office 14 November 2017

Personal details
- Born: 4 April 1979 (age 47) Hannover
- Party: Alternative for Germany

Peer Lilienthal (born 4 April 1979 in Hannover) is a German politician serving as a member of the Landtag of Lower Saxony since 2017. He has served as treasurer of the Alternative for Germany group in the Landtag since 2022, having previously served from 2017 to 2020.
