= Austral Island =

Small Antarctic island in the extreme southern lobe of Penney Bay

- Location within Antarctica

Geography
- Location: Antarctica
- Coordinates: 66°30′S 110°39′E
- Archipelago: Windmill Islands

Administration
- Administered under the Antarctic Treaty System

Demographics
- Population: Uninhabited

Austral Island is a small Antarctic island in the extreme southern lobe of Penney Bay, in the Windmill Islands. The island appears in air photos taken by USN Operation Highjump (1946–47), but was not charted on subsequent maps. So named by US-ACAN because it is the southernmost of the Windmill Islands.

== See also ==
- Composite Antarctic Gazetteer
- List of Antarctic and sub-Antarctic islands
- List of Antarctic islands south of 60° S
- SCAR
- Territorial claims in Antarctica
