= Fremantle Peak =

Mountain in Australia

Fremantle Peak (53°5′S 73°30′E) is a peak, 2,375 metres (7,800 ft) high, standing 0.4 nautical miles (0.7 km) northeast of the Dome, near the summit of Heard Island. It was surveyed in 1948 by the Australian National Antarctic Research Expeditions, and named by them after the port of Fremantle, the final point of embarkation for the expedition.
