= Swain Islands =

Island group of the Windmill Islands in Antarctica

- Location within Antarctica

Geography
- Coordinates: 66°13′S 110°37′E
- Archipelago: Windmill Islands

Administration
- Administered under the Antarctic Treaty System

Demographics
- Population: Uninhabited

The Swain Islands are a group of small islands and rocks about 3.7 kilometres (2 nmi) in extent, lying 0.9 kilometres (0.5 nmi) north of Clark Peninsula at the northeast end of the Windmill Islands. Delineated from aerial photographs taken by U.S. Navy Operation Highjump in February 1947. Named by the Advisory Committee on Antarctic Names (US-ACAN) for K. C. Swain who served as air crewman with the central task group of U.S. Navy Operation Highjump, 1946–47, and also with USN. Operation Windmill which obtained aerial and ground photographic coverage of the Windmill Islands in January 1948.

== Islands ==
- Berkley Island
- Bradford Rock
- Burnett Island
- Cameron Island
- Daniel Island
- Hailstorm Island
- Honkala Island
- Wonsey Rock
- Wyche Island

== See also ==
- Composite Antarctic Gazetteer
- List of Antarctic and sub-Antarctic islands
- List of Antarctic islands south of 60° S
- SCAR
- Territorial claims in Antarctica
- Swains Island
