= Charlotte Bøving (doctor) =

Danish doctor and television presenter (born 1967)

- Born: 1 June 1967 (age 58)
- Occupations: Doctor; television presenter
- Spouse(s): Pernille Lok (m. 2017; div. 2019) Christina Jørgensen (m. 2021; div. 2023)

Charlotte Bøving (born 1 June 1967) is a Danish physician and television presenter.

Bøving grew up in Varde, Denmark. In 1997, she started her career as a doctor in a training capacity at Varde Hospital. She joined her parents practice three years later.

Bøving rose to prominence as a figure after discussing problems with her father, who she described as a psychopath, in the TV series Din psykopat!. She later became involved with the DR program Lægen flytter ind, and later hosted the program Jagten på Stilheden.

Bøving released an autobiography in 2018, entitled Jeg lever med en udløbsdato, which detailed her life to that point. She revealed in 2019 that the book's release caused her brother to no longer speak to her. By 2026, the two had reconciled and began working together at Jugendhuset in Varde.

== Personal life ==
Bøving has been married four times in total. She was married to Pernille Lok from 2017 to 2019. The couple reportedly ended their divorce on good terms. She soon after met her second wife, Christina Jørgensen. The two were married from 2021 to 2023, before divorcing.

In 2016, Bøving revealed she had been diagnosed with stomach cancer.
