= Donovan Islands =

Chain of islands in Vincennes Bay

- Location within Antarctica

Geography
- Location: Antarctica
- Coordinates: 66°11′S 110°24′E

Administration
- Administered under the Antarctic Treaty System

Demographics
- Population: Uninhabited

The Donovan Islands are a chain of about 8 islands lying well offshore, about 9 kilometres (5 nmi) northwest of Clark Peninsula in the eastern part of Vincennes Bay. First mapped from air photos taken by U.S. Navy Operation Highjump, 1946–47, they were photographed from the air by the Australian National Antarctic Research Expeditions in January 1956, and were named after J. Donovan, Administrative Officer of the Antarctic Division, Melbourne, and leader of a number of relief expeditions to Heard Island and Macquarie Island.

== See also ==
- List of antarctic and sub-antarctic islands
