= Casey Station =

- Antarctic base
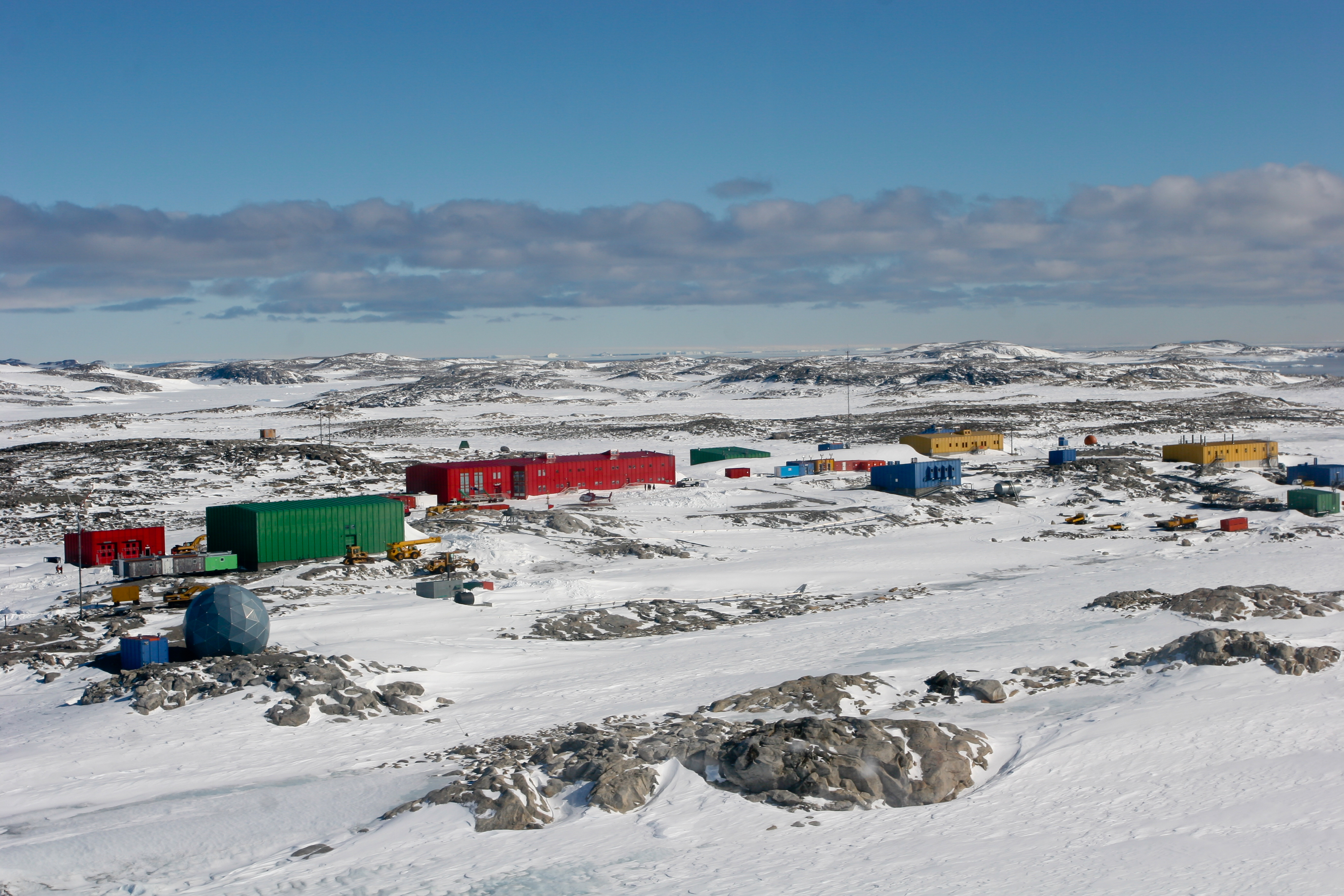
- Casey Station, viewed from the air.

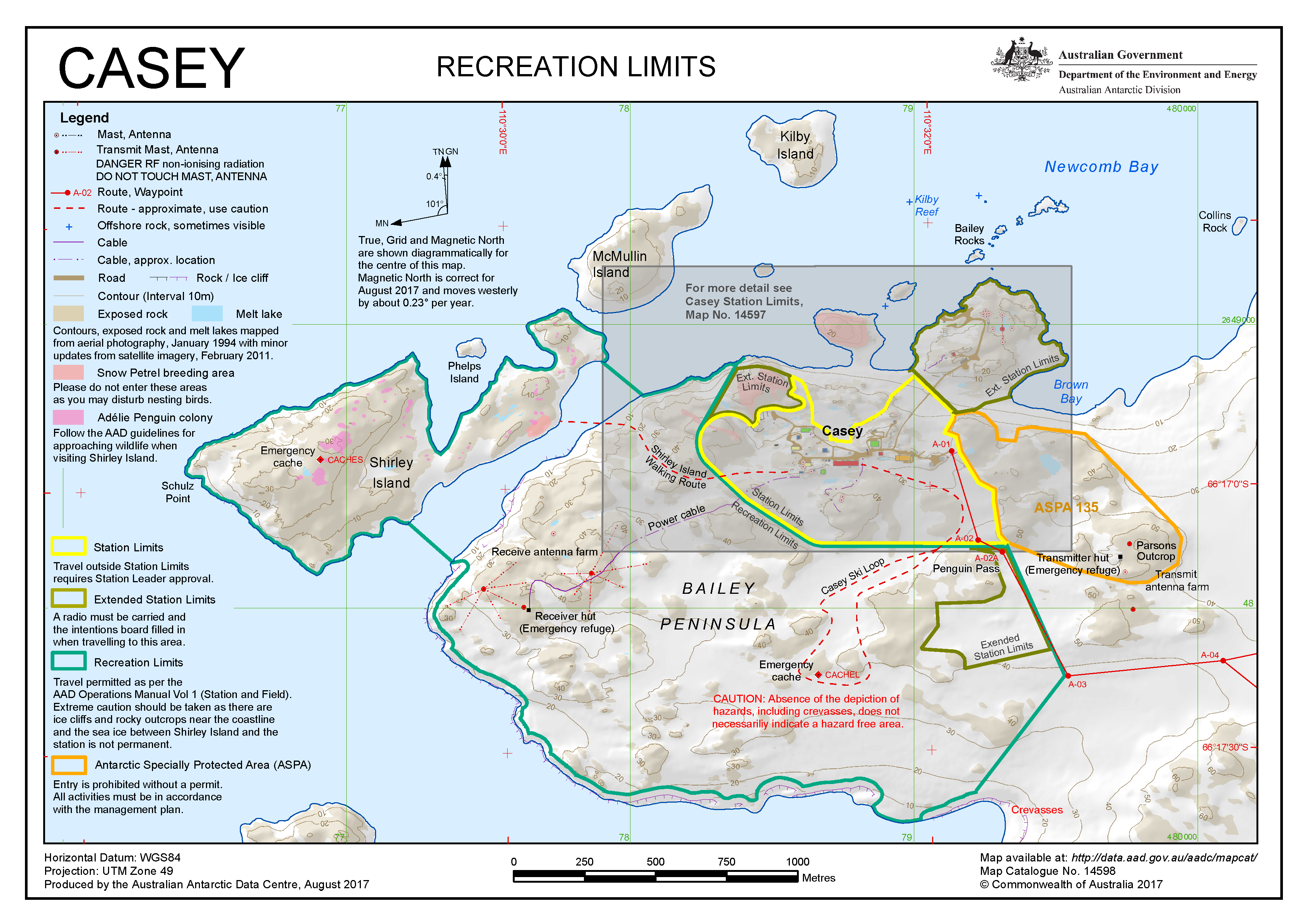
- Location on Bailey Peninsula

- Location of Casey Station in Antarctica
- Coordinates: 66°16′57″S 110°31′36″E
- Country: Australia
- Territory: Australian Antarctic Territory
- Subdivision: Wilkes Land
- Administered by: Australian Antarctic Division
- Established: February 1969
- Named for: Richard, Baron Casey
- Elevation: 32 m (105 ft)

Population (2017)
  - Summer: 99
  - Winter: 21
- Time zone: UTC+8
- UN/LOCODE: AQ CAS
- Type: All year-round
- Period: Annual
- Status: Operational
- Activities: List: Bedrock geology; Marine biology
- Facilities: List: Wilkins airstrip; Accommodation with private bedrooms and shared bathrooms; Communal living area with indoor climbing, a home theatre, a gym, a photographic dark room, a library and communal sitting areas; Meteorological Centre; Hydroponics building (lettuce, green vegetables, tomatoes and fresh herbs are grown)
- Website: aad.gov.au

Casey Station, commonly called Casey, is one of three permanent bases and research outposts in Antarctica maintained by the Australian Antarctic Division (AAD). Casey Station lies on the northern side of the Bailey Peninsula overlooking Vincennes Bay on the Budd Coast of Wilkes Land in the Australian Antarctic Territory, a sector of Antarctica claimed by Australia as an external territory. Casey is 3,880 kilometres (2,410 mi) due south of Perth, Western Australia.

Casey was named in honour of Richard, Baron Casey.

== History ==
Casey is close to the now-abandoned Wilkes Station, established by the United States of America to support science and exploration of Antarctica during the International Geophysical Year (IGY) in 1957–1958.

Australia took Wilkes over after the IGY, but the American buildings were already unusable due to the build-up of ice around them. Australia built the first Casey Base, originally as "Repstat", referring to "replacement station", on the opposite south side of the Newcomb Bay in 1964, with works completed in February 1969. This set of buildings was a unique attempt to prevent the problem of ice build-up by elevating the buildings on stilts, to encourage the wind to blow beneath as well as above, and connecting the entire line of buildings with a corrugated iron tunnel. This would, it was hoped, clear the buildup of snow each year, while allowing personnel to move between buildings without having to brave the elements. It worked for some time until corrosion occurred.

The current Casey Station headquarters (the "Red Shed") was built in the late 1980s as part of the Australian Government's Antarctic Re-building Program. It was prefabricated in Hobart, Tasmania, by Hobart construction firm Contas Pty Ltd; trial-erected on the wharf at Hobart; then dismantled, packaged and shipped to Antarctica. Erected at Casey by tradespeople employed as workers on the normal summer expedition crews, it incorporates innovative design features to prevent the transfer of heat through the structure. The "Shed" is conspicuously located near the top of the hill on which the old radio masts stood. It is probably the largest single structure on Antarctica and was first occupied in 1988. The station has two other sheds, the green shed for storing food and the yellow shed for brewing. Homebrew beer is served at the station's bar, "Splinters". While the old transmitter hut of the original Wilkes Station, nicknamed the "Wilkes Hilton", is now used as temporary accommodation for Casey personnel.

== Current research ==
Since 2008, scientists based at Casey have contributed to research into study of the Law Dome, the bedrock geology and structure of the East Antarctic ice sheet and its glaciological processes. In more recent years, Casey has served as a base for marine biologists to examine changes to polar seafloor communities exposed to different carbon dioxide concentrations. Adélie penguin research is conducted at Casey. Scientists are also studying the influence of climate change and human impact on extensive and well developed moss beds that grow at and near Casey.

== Infrastructure ==
Casey is 3,443 km (2,139 mi) from Hobart, the AAD's main supply hub for Antarctic operations, and 2,722 km (1,691 mi) from Fremantle Peak, Heard Island.

=== Access methods ===
Access to Casey is possible via a four-hour flight from Hobart, followed by a four-hour ride in an over-snow bus.

=== Road ===
The old and new stations are connected by a 1.5-kilometre-long (0.93 mi) road. The road is excavated by a bulldozer/excavator set at the end of every winter, providing a means to get supplies from the wharf to the new station, leaving ice walls 8 metres (26 ft) tall in places.

=== Earth stations ===
Casey has a dome-covered satellite tracking antenna. The antenna was upgraded in March 2016 to communicate with a Himawari-8 satellite, allowing the station to monitor and track weather related information. There is also an ANARESAT satellite for communication.

=== Airstrips ===
Casey Station Skiway
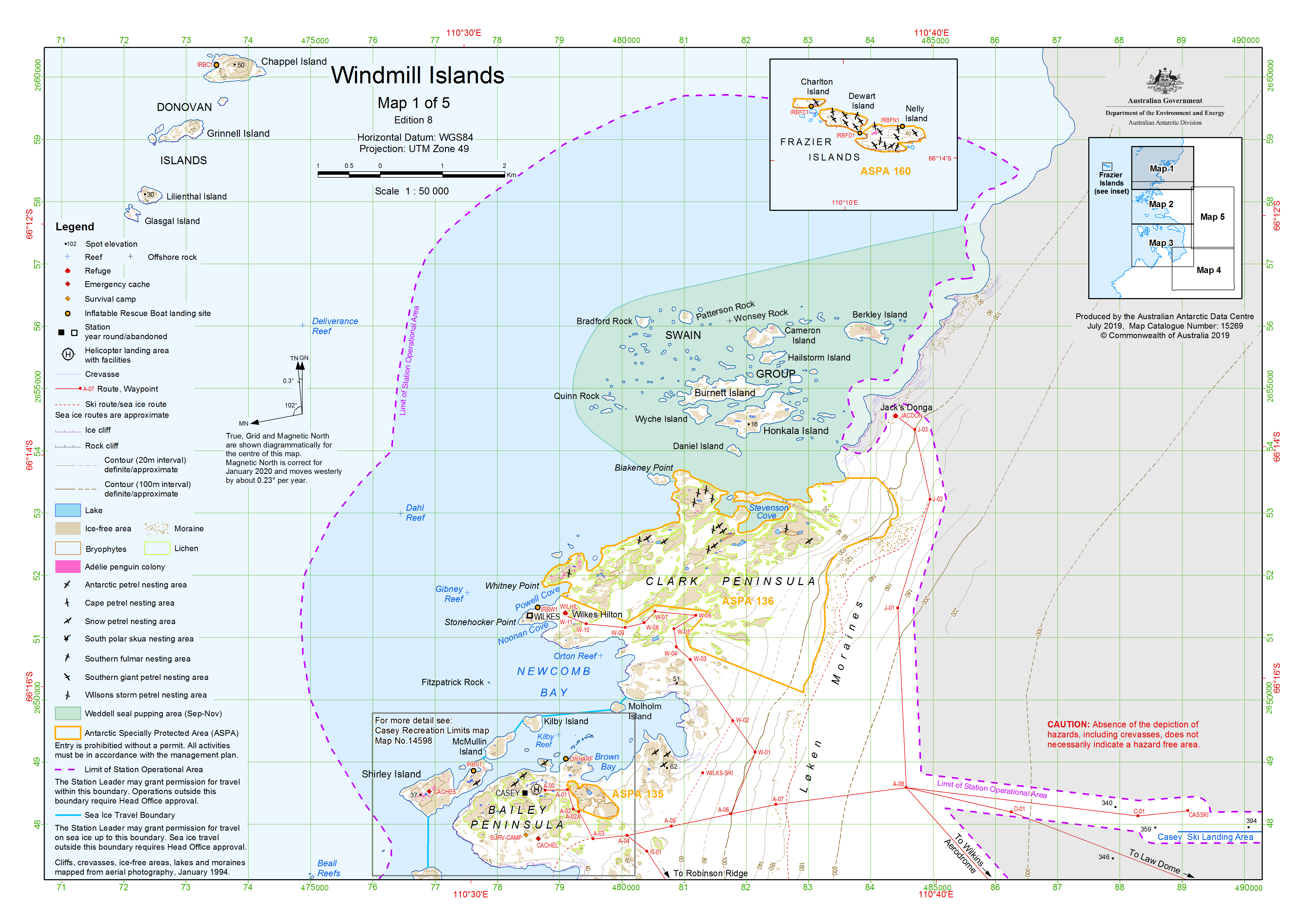
- Location east of Casey Station proper
- IATA: none; ICAO: YCSK

Summary
- Airport type: Private
- Operator: Australian Antarctic Division
- Location: Budd Coast; Wilkes Land
- Time zone: (UTC+8)
- Elevation AMSL: 1,179 ft (359 m)
- Coordinates: 66°17′17″S 110°45′27″E
- Interactive map of Casey Station Skiway

Runways
Direction	Length		Surface
Direction	ft	m	Surface
9/27	6,547	1,996	Ice

Casey is significant as a transport hub for the Australian Antarctic program, with the introduction of intercontinental jet flights for scientists and operational staff from Hobart to the Wilkins ice runway, 65 kilometres (40 mi) inland from Casey station. The inaugural landing of the AAD's Airbus A319 aircraft was on the evening of 9 December 2007.

The smaller Casey Station Skiway (66°17′17″S 110°45′27″E) is located 10 kilometres (6.2 mi) east of the station, and opened on 30 December 2004.

In March 2009, the Australian ABC Foreign Correspondent international affairs television program featured air operations at Casey Station as part of a report titled Antarctica - What Lies Beneath.

== Climate ==
Casey Station experiences an ice cap climate (EF) bordering on a tundra climate (ET), with its warmest month, January, having a mean temperature just below freezing, −0.1 °C (31.8 °F): This station experienced record warm temperatures and precipitation due to an unprecedented atmospheric river event in March 2022.

Climate data for Casey Station
Month	Jan	Feb	Mar	Apr	May	Jun	Jul	Aug	Sep	Oct	Nov	Dec	Year
Record high °C (°F)	9.2 (48.6)	6.6 (43.9)	5.6 (42.1)	3.0 (37.4)	4.5 (40.1)	4.2 (39.6)	3.0 (37.4)	5.8 (42.4)	3.9 (39.0)	3.2 (37.8)	4.9 (40.8)	8.0 (46.4)	9.2 (48.6)
Mean daily maximum °C (°F)	2.2 (36.0)	−0.1 (31.8)	−4.1 (24.6)	−7.5 (18.5)	−11.1 (12.0)	−10.4 (13.3)	−10.2 (13.6)	−10.2 (13.6)	−9.7 (14.5)	−8.0 (17.6)	−2.5 (27.5)	1.4 (34.5)	−5.9 (21.4)
Mean daily minimum °C (°F)	−2.6 (27.3)	−5.0 (23.0)	−9.8 (14.4)	−14.6 (5.7)	−18.5 (−1.3)	−18.3 (−0.9)	−18.4 (−1.1)	−18 (0)	−17.1 (1.2)	−15.1 (4.8)	−9.0 (15.8)	−3.7 (25.3)	−12.5 (9.5)
Record low °C (°F)	−10.3 (13.5)	−18.0 (−0.4)	−25.1 (−13.2)	−31.3 (−24.3)	−34.4 (−29.9)	−34.1 (−29.4)	−36.4 (−33.5)	−37.5 (−35.5)	−33.8 (−28.8)	−31.2 (−24.2)	−23.4 (−10.1)	−13.0 (8.6)	−37.5 (−35.5)
Average precipitation mm (inches)	9.3 (0.37)	15.2 (0.60)	18.0 (0.71)	20.6 (0.81)	25.6 (1.01)	27.5 (1.08)	28.5 (1.12)	21.0 (0.83)	17.3 (0.68)	16.5 (0.65)	12.7 (0.50)	12.9 (0.51)	222.5 (8.76)
Average precipitation days (≥ 0.2 mm)	6.6	7.5	8.9	9.3	9.7	11.2	10.3	8.5	8.6	8.1	5.9	5.9	100.5
Mean monthly sunshine hours	161.2	135.6	99.2	60.0	21.7	3.0	12.4	43.4	87.0	139.5	213.0	182.9	1,158.9
Source: Bureau of Meteorology

== See also ==
- Brown Bay
- List of Antarctic research stations
- List of Antarctic field camps
- List of airports in Antarctica
