= Clark Peninsula =

Peninsula of Antarctica

Coordinates: 66°15′S 110°33′E

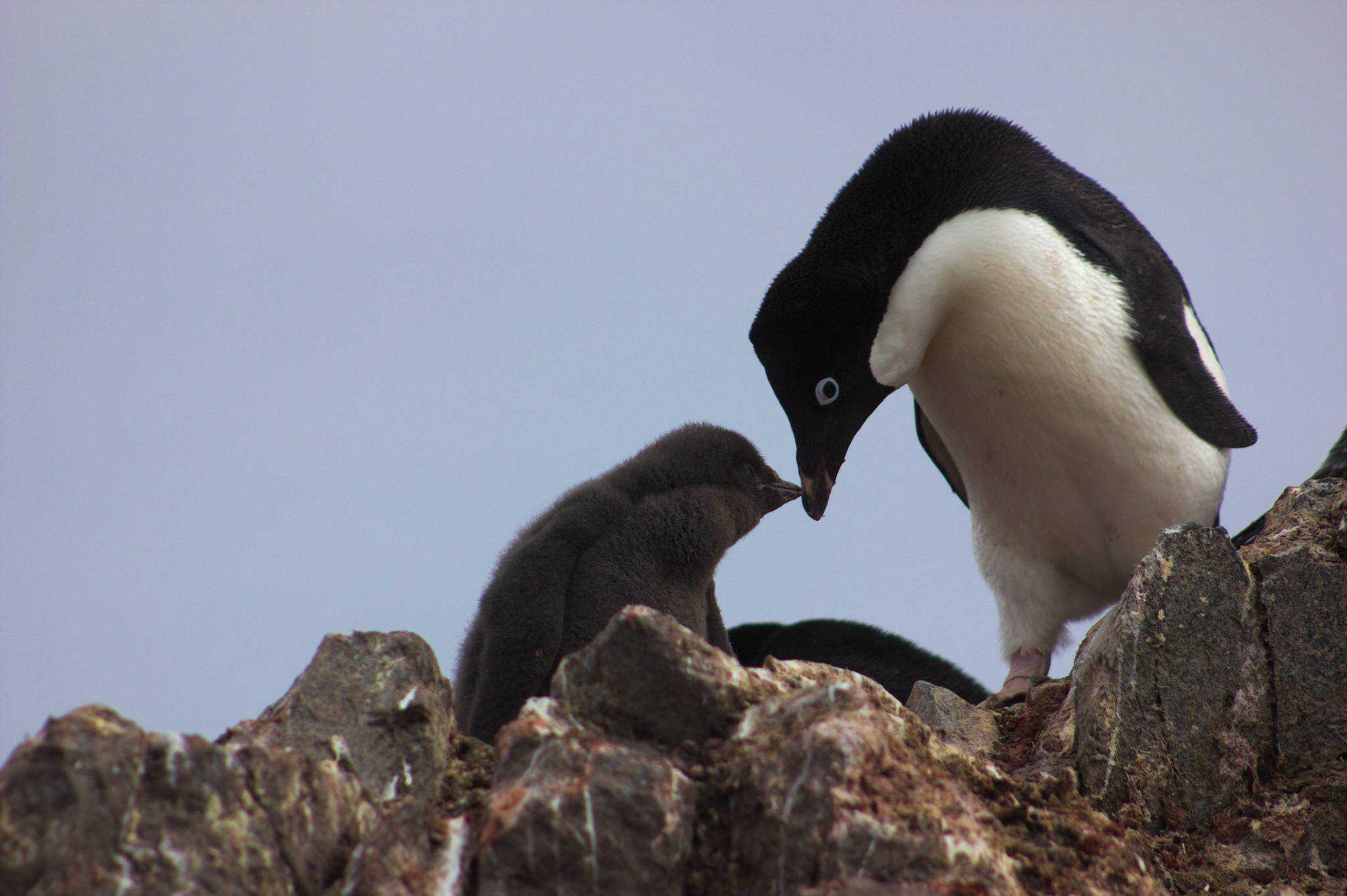
Large numbers of Adélie penguins breed on the peninsula

Clark Peninsula is a rocky peninsula, about 3 km (2 mi) long and wide, lying 5 km (3 mi) north-east of Australia's Casey Station at the north side of Newcomb Bay on the Budd Coast of Wilkes Land in Antarctica.

== History ==
The peninsula was first mapped from aerial photographs taken by the US Navy's Operation Highjump in February 1947 and thought to be an island connected by a steep snow ramp to the continental ice overlying Budd Coast. It was subsequently photographed from the air by the Soviet expedition of 1956 and the Australian National Antarctic Research Expeditions (ANARE) of 1956 and 1962.

The Wilkes Station party of 1957, whose headquarters were on Clark, determined that it was a peninsula rather than an island. This party was led by Scientific Station Leader Carl R. Eklund, who conducted many ground surveys and named many of the peninsula's features. The peninsula itself was named by the Advisory Committee on Antarctic Names (US-ACAN) for Captain John E. Clark, captain of USS Currituck, flagship of the western task group of Operation Highjump, 1946–1947.

== Geography ==
Clark Peninsula is large enough that numerous features on its coast have been individually charted and named. The peninsula protrudes into the ocean to the west. Notable features will be described following the coastline, beginning from the north and continuing towards the south. Unless otherwise noted, all of the following features were first mapped from air photos taken by Operation Highjump in 1946–1947, and named by Carl Eklund following ground surveys in 1957, typically for members of the Wilkes Station party.

The first notable feature on the northern coast of the peninsula is Stevenson Cove. It was named for Andrew Stevenson, economic advisor to the U.S. House of Representatives Committee on Interstate and Foreign Commerce, author of a report for the Committee on the International Geophysical Year in the Arctic and Antarctic. To the west is the peninsula's northernmost extremity, Blakeney Point. It was named by US-ACAN for A. A. Blakeney, photographer's mate on Operation Highjump.

Whitney Point is a rocky point that marks the north side of the entrance to Powell Cove. When initially charted, it was thought to be a small island. It was named for photographer's mate I.A. Whitney of Operation Highjump. Powell Cove was named for aerographer James T. Powell. The westernmost extremity of the peninsula is rocky Stonehocker Point, which is the site of Wilkes Station. It was named for ionospheric scientist Garth H. Stonehocker. South of Stonehocker Point is Noonan Cove, named for photographer Paul F. Noonan. To the south, Newcomb Bay separates Clark Peninsula from Bailey Peninsula. Inland to the east, at the base of the peninsula are the Løken Moraines, a line of north-south trending moraines, or accumulations of glacial debris.

=== Offshore features ===
A narrow rock reef called Dahl Reef, which uncovers at low tide, lies 1.4 nautical miles (2.6 km) northwest of Stonehocker Point. It was first charted in 1962, during a hydrographic survey of Newcomb Bay and approaches, by d'A. T. Gale of ANARE. It was named for Egil Dahl, third mate on Thala Dan, the ship used by ANARE in 1962.

Gibney Reef is exposed off the shore 0.5 nautical miles (0.9 km) to the west of the peninsula. It was first charted in February 1957 by a party from USS Glacier. The name was suggested by Lt. Robert C. Newcomb, USN, the navigator of Glacier, after Seaman Joseph Gibney's idea to name it Mussolini Reef was rejected.

== Antarctic Specially Protected Area ==
The 9.4 km^{2} peninsula is protected under the Antarctic Treaty System as Antarctic Specially Protected Area (ASPA) No.136 because of the long-term and ongoing research programs and monitoring studies carried out on its plant communities and Adélie penguin breeding colonies. Other birds breeding at the site include south polar skuas, Wilson's storm petrels and snow petrels. The site has also been designated an Important Bird Area (IBA) by BirdLife International because of its large numbers of breeding seabirds.
