= Newcomb Bay =

Bay in Antarctica

- Location within Antarctica

- Location: Newcomb Bay (Antarctica)
- Coordinates: 66°16′S 110°33′E
- Ocean/sea sources: Southern Ocean

Newcomb Bay is a sheltered bay about 1 mile (1.6 km) in extent, between Clark Peninsula and Bailey Peninsula in the Windmill Islands area.

First mapped from U.S. Navy Operation Highjump aerial photographs taken in February 1947. In February 1957, Willis L. Tressler, oceanographer, led a party from the USS Glacier (AGB-4) to survey the bay and record depth soundings. Name suggested by Tressler for Lieutenant Robert C. Newcomb, U.S. Navy, navigator of the Glacier and member of the survey party.

On the northern side of Newcomb Bay, Wilkes Station was located, while the southern side is the location of Casey Station.

== See also ==
- Larsen Bank
- Orton Reef
