= Bailey Peninsula =

Rocky peninsula in Antarctica

Coordinates: 66°17′S 110°31′E

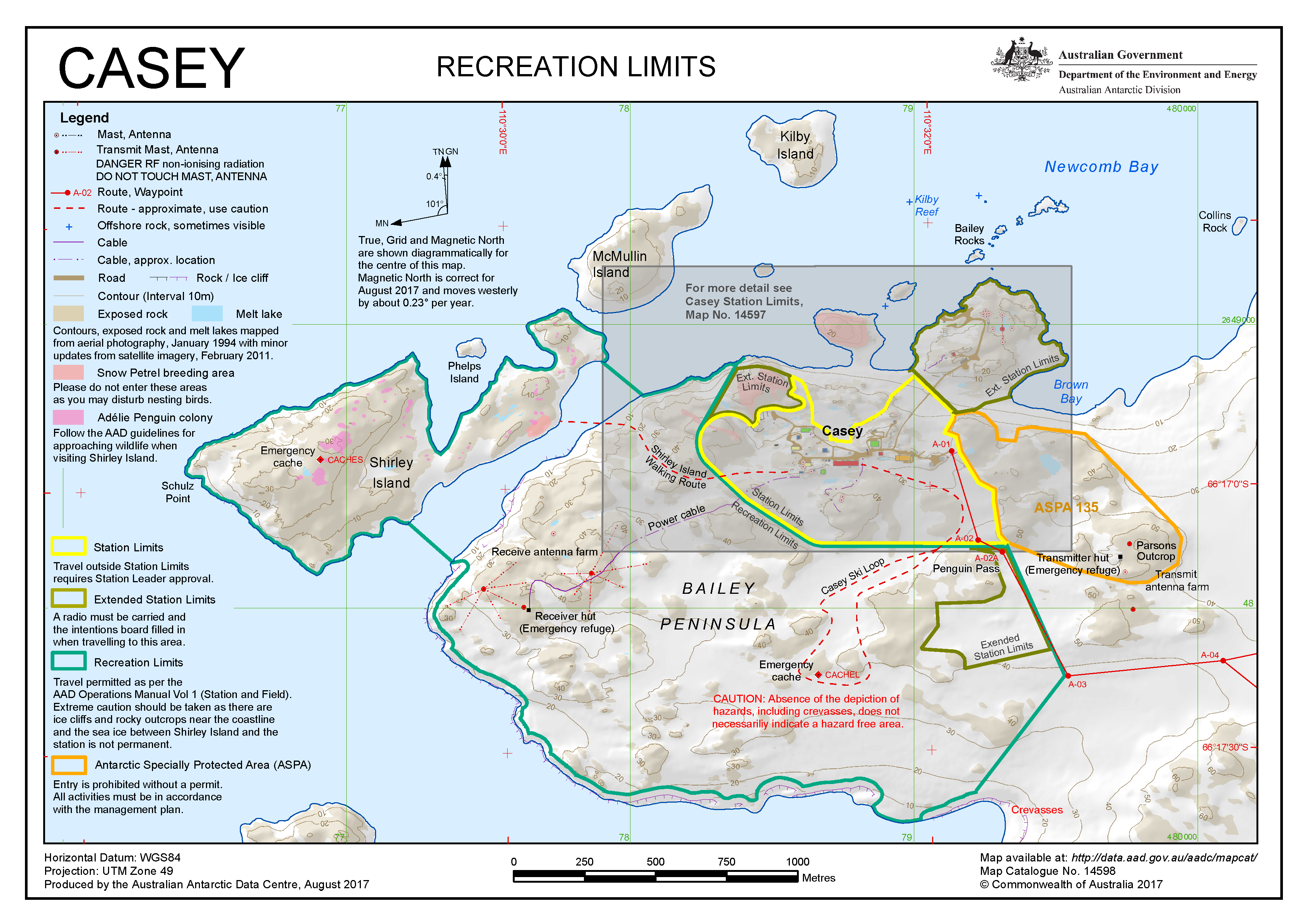
Map of Bailey Peninsula with the Casey Station

Bailey Peninsula is a rocky peninsula, about 2.6 km (2 mi) long and 1.5 km (1 mi) wide, on the Budd Coast of Wilkes Land in Antarctica. It is the site of Australia’s Casey Station.

== Antarctic Specially Protected Area ==
An area of land on the peninsula, lying only some 200 m east of Casey Station, is protected under the Antarctic Treaty System as North-east Bailey Peninsula Antarctic Specially Protected Area (ASPA) No.135 primarily because it serves as a scientific reference site which has supported studies into the diverse range of vegetation found in the Windmill Islands region.

The Casey Station reported the first heatwave at the site in 2020, with temperatures reaching 9.2 degrees Celsius in January.

== See also ==
- Holt Point
