= Carl R. Eklund =

American ornithologist

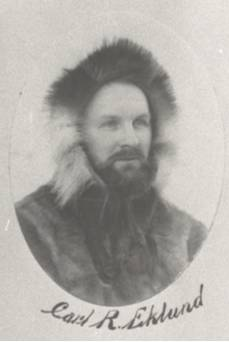
- Self portrait, Antarctica 1941
- Born: January 27, 1909; Tomahawk, Wisconsin
- Died: November 3, 1962 (aged 53); Philadelphia, Pennsylvania
- Occupation: Ornithologist
- Known for: Antarctic exploration, namesake of Eklund Islands

Carl Robert Eklund (January 27, 1909 – November 3, 1962) was a leading American specialist in ornithology and geographic research in both the north and south polar regions. He was appointed as the first Scientific Station Leader of the Wilkes Station, Antarctica.

== Biography ==
Carl Robert Eklund was born in Tomahawk, Wisconsin. His father immigrated from Sweden in 1888. His brother was Wisconsin journalist Laurence C. Eklund. He attended University of Wisconsin and received his B.A. degree in 1932 from Carleton College. He earned his M.S. degree in 1938 at Oregon State College. In 1959, the University of Maryland awarded him a Ph.D. in zoology and geography. During World War II he served as a major in the U.S. Army Air Force.

From 1939 to 1941 he served as ornithologist at the East Base of the U.S. Antarctic Service. This was the first modern US. Government-sponsored expedition to Antarctica, and the third of Rear Admiral Richard E. Byrd's Antarctic commands. In addition to his collection of animal life for the Department of the Interior, Fish and Wildlife Service, Eklund made one of the longest Antarctic dog sled journeys in history, accompanying Finn Ronne. The islands sighted near the turning point of this journey were named the Eklund Islands in his honour by the Board of Geographical Names.

== See also ==
- Paul Siple
- Arctic Institute of North America
