= Windmill Islands =

Island group in Antarctica

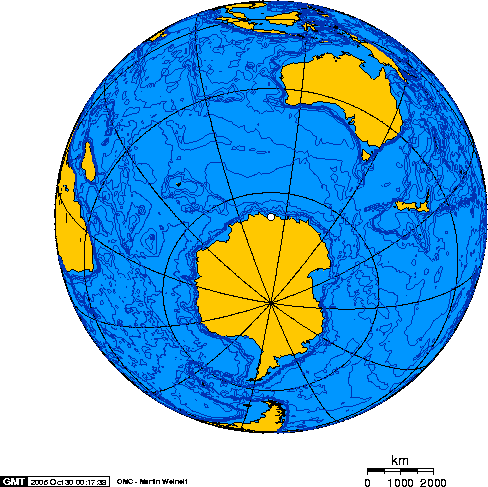
- Orthographic projection over the Windmill Islands

- Location within Antarctica

Geography
- Location: Vincennes Bay
- Coordinates: 66°20′S 110°28′E

Administration
- Administered under the Antarctic Treaty System

Demographics
- Population: Uninhabited

The Windmill Islands are an Antarctic group of rocky islands and rocks about 11.1 kilometres (6 nmi) wide, paralleling the coast of Wilkes Land for 31.5 kilometres (17 nmi) immediately north of Vanderford Glacier along the east side of Vincennes Bay. Kirkby Shoal is a small shoal area with depths of less than 18 metres (59 ft) extending about 140 metres (459 ft) westwards and SSW, about 3.4 kilometres (2.1 mi) from the summit of Shirley Island, Windmill Islands, and 0.24 kilometres (0.15 mi) NW of Stonehocker Point, Clark Peninsula.

The Windmill Islands were mapped from aerial photographs taken by USN Operation Highjump, 1946–47. So named by the US-ACAN because personnel of Operation Windmill, 1947–48, landed on Holl Island at the southwest end of the group to establish ground control for USN Operation Highjump photographs. The term "Operation Windmill" is a popular expression which developed after the expedition disbanded and refers to the extensive use of helicopters made by this group. The official title of this expedition was the 'Second Antarctic Development Project', U.S. Navy Task Force 39, 1947–48.

== Features ==
Some of the main geographic features of the archipelago are:

- Austral Island
- Kilby Island
- Kirkby Shoal
- Larsen Bank
- McMullin Island
- Molholm Island
- Shirley Island

== See also ==
- Composite Antarctic Gazetteer
- Harrigan Hill
- Holt Point
- List of Antarctic and sub-Antarctic islands
- List of Antarctic islands south of 60° S
- Newcomb Bay
- Nye Islands
- SCAR
- Territorial claims in Antarctica
