= Wilkes Station =

- Antarctic base
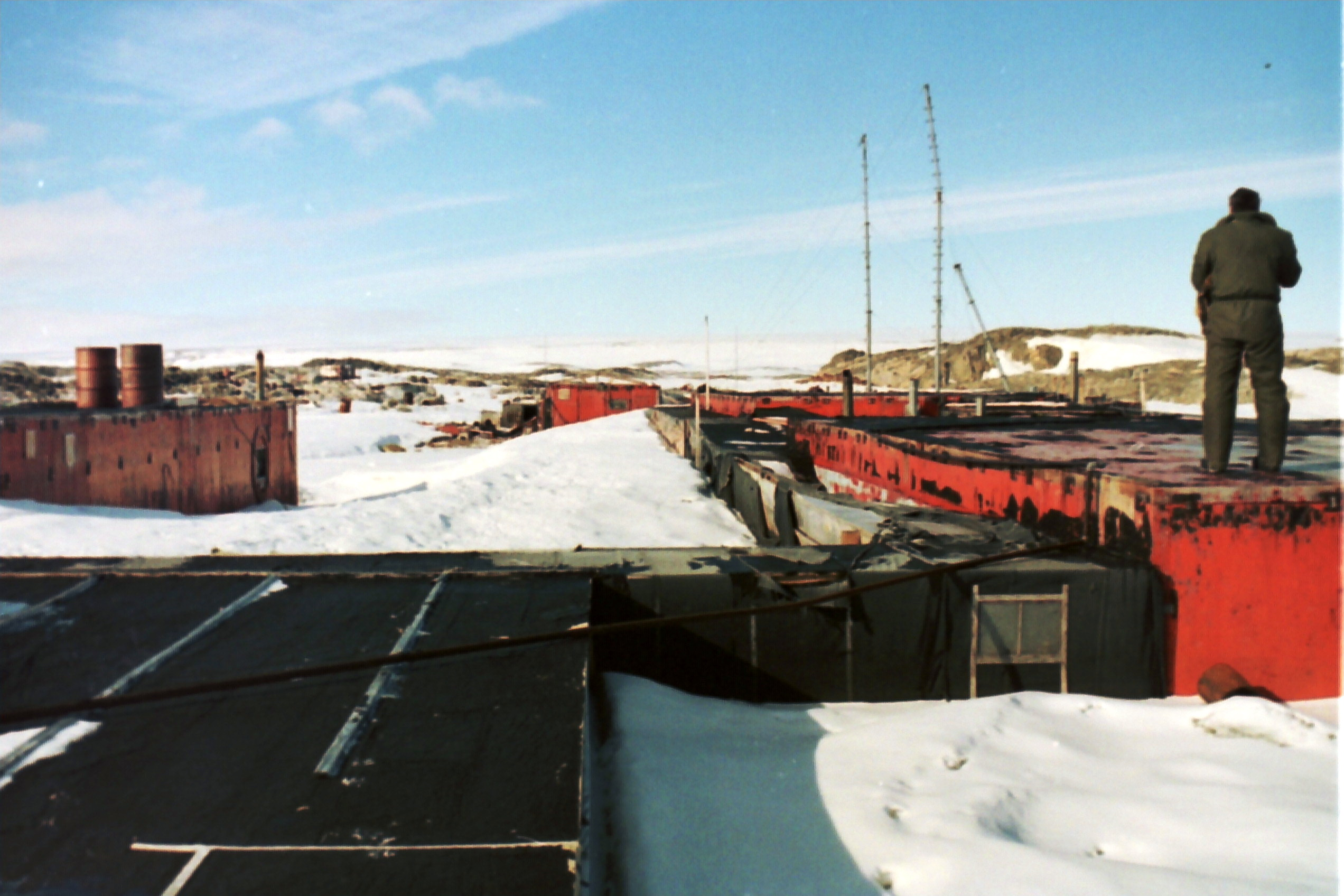
- Wilkes Station in 1988

- Location of Wikes Station in Antarctica
- Coordinates: 66°15′25″S 110°31′37″E
- Country: United States; Australia
- Location in Antarctica: Wilkes Land; Antarctica
- Administered by: United States Navy; Australian Antarctic Division
- Established: 29 January 1957 7 February 1959 to Australia
- Evacuated: 1969
- Named for: Charles Wilkes

Population
  - Total: Up to 24
- Type: All-year round
- Period: Annual
- Status: Abandoned
- Website: Wilkes Station AAD

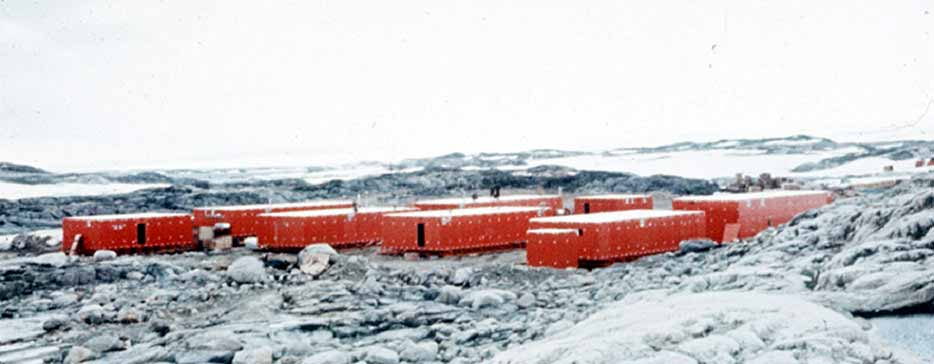
Wilkes Station, 1957

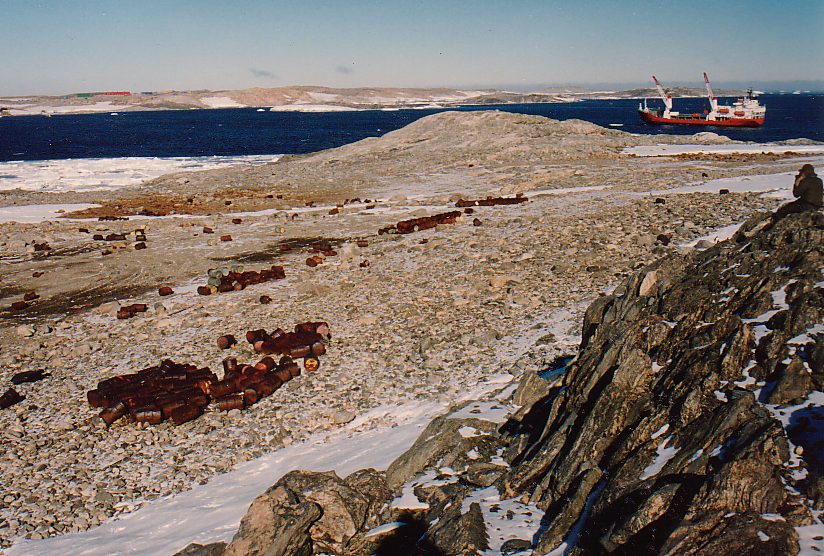
1988 photo shows diesel oil drums in the foreground, oil spill visible on the left in the middle distance; the Icebird is visible at anchor in Vincennes Bay; Casey Station on the skyline at the left in the distance across the bay

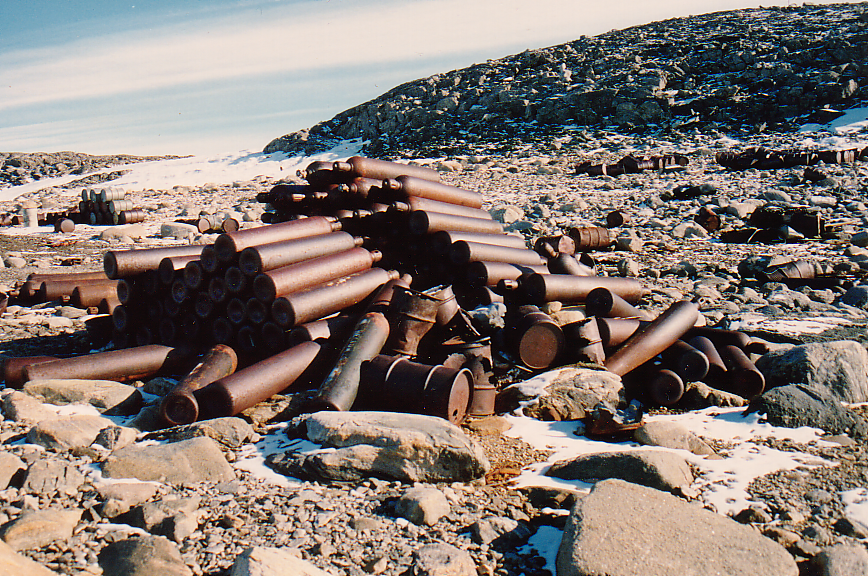
Discarded hydrogen gas cylinders used for meteorological analysis at Wilkes Station

Wilkes Station is a former Australian Antarctic research station. It was established in January 1957 by the United States in Antarctica. It was taken over by the Australian Antarctic Division on 7 February 1959. Environmental difficulties at this site led to its being abandoned in 1969, with the Australians establishing a new base, Casey Station. The old base is still awaiting remediation, with contamination left at the site threatening to affect the environment.

== History ==
Wilkes Station was established in January 1957 as part of the United States International Geophysical Year program. It was built by US Navy personnel on the Clark Peninsula, and named after Charles Wilkes, a 19th-century American explorer who discovered the phenomenon of the continental margin, which helped prove that Antarctica was a continent.

Wilkes was one of seven bases that the United States built for the IGY, which also included McMurdo, Hallett, Admundsen-Scott (South Pole Station), Ellsworth, Byrd, and Little America. Of these only McMurdo and Admundsen-Scott are still operated by the 21st century.

Personnel from the United States Navy constructed the main part of Wilkes in a period of 16 days in January and February 1957, unloading 11,000 tons of material and supplies. It took a crew of over 100 to erect the station, which housed 24 naval personnel and scientists for the next 18 months. As this was the time of the Cold War, there was considerable concern by the United States and Australia about Russian activity in Antarctica. Wilkes was seen to be strategically located because of its proximity to the south magnetic pole.

On 4 February 1959 Australia assumed custody of Wilkes, which remained the property of the U.S. State Department. Although Australia officially took over the operational command, the remaining US personnel did not take kindly to being under Australian control. In 1961 the station came under exclusive ANARE control.

At the time it was built, it was thought to be a good location for a base; however, it was found to be not sheltered from the strong winds, which kept covering the accommodation and equipment with snow and ice. By 1964 the buildings had become a fire hazard due to fuel seepage. The wooden buildings deteriorated, and became covered by snow for most of the year.

The Australians left the station in 1969, when the new Casey Station, located on the other side of Newcomb Bay, was commissioned. Cleaning up the buildings, old equipment and waste dump at the abandoned base was not considered at the time.

== Description ==
Wilkes Station covers 33 ha (82 acres). As of 2026, what remains at Wilkes are a number of barracks buildings known as Clements huts, the remnants of the semi-cylindrical canvas store buildings known as Jamesway huts, and the transmitter hut, nicknamed the "Wilkes Hilton", which is occasionally used as temporary accommodation for Casey personnel.

Wilkes Station is now almost permanently frozen in ice and the extent of what is left is only occasionally revealed during a big thaw, such as occurred in 1992. Many objects remain embedded in the ice, and photographs from the 1960s reveal a large cache of fuel.

== Remediation ==
Wilkes features a series of storage dumps and a considerable amount of waste resulting from 12 years of occupation, including approximately 7000 fuel and oil drums. In early 1988, the Australian Army's 17th Construction Squadron deployed Lieutenant Andrew Stanner to Wilkes Station in order to develop an environmental clean-up plan to remove, make safe, or dispose of a large accumulation of rubbish, fuel in drums, explosives, chemicals, and gas cylinders deposited since the late 1950s. The initial phase of the plan was subsequently carried out over a period of years for the Australian National Antarctic Research Expeditions by a series of detachments from the squadron. (Note: Rex Moncur was director of the Australian Antarctic Division in Hobart.)

In 2024, a French inspection team reported that the abandoned Wilkes Station posed a "clear risk" to the environment. The team was focused on doing an assessment of the site. As of February 2026, planning was taking place with regard to what needed to be done, but to there was still no time frame or funding for the project. The French team raised the issue at the Antarctic Treaty Consultative Meeting that year. In 2025, there was some cleaning of materials at surface level, with around 14 m^{3} (490 cu ft) of waste removed by Australian environmental engineers, along with some of the fuel stockpile. The waste, which included metal poles, bed frames, wooden debris, cans, rope, and electrical wire, was flown to Casey Station and returned to Australia by ship.

However, research using ground-penetrating radars had shown that there remained around 20 Olympic-size swimming pools of waste and contaminated soil at the site, including asbestos. The station's former rubbish tip contains batteries, tins of food, and animal carcasses. Challenges to completion of the clean-up include the extreme weather and complex logistics. Careful planning is needed to avoid more damage being caused to the environment, and a comprehensive risk assessment has been in progress for a number of years. Remediation of the site has yet to be fully costed.

== Personnel ==
Robert B. Thomson of New Zealand, who had been scientific leader at Hallett Station in 1960, became officer-in-charge at Wilkes Station in 1962, and led the September 1962 Wilkes-Vostock Traverse. He was later deputy leader at Scott Base, in 1963–64. Thomson Peak, in the Mirabito Range, Victoria Land, was named after him.

== In literature ==
- Ice Station, written by Matthew Reilly, is a fiction thriller loosely based on Wilkes Station.
- The Coldest Place on Earth (1969), by Robert B. Thomson, is an account of the Wilkes-Vostok traverse.

== See also ==
- List of Antarctic research stations
- List of Antarctic field camps
- Australian Antarctic Division
- Casey Station
- Budd Coast
