= Bond Glacier =

Glacier in Wilkes Land, Antarctica

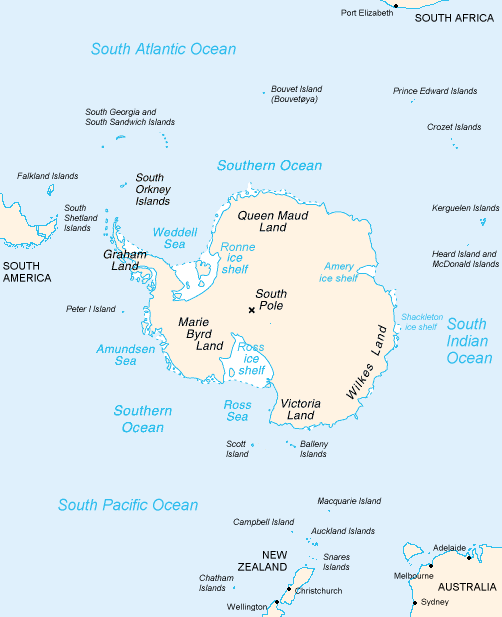
- Map of Antarctica, with Wilkes Land slightly to the right

- Location within Antarctica
- Type: heavily crevassed
- Location: Wilkes Land
- Coordinates: 66°58′00″S 109°00′00″E
- Thickness: unknown
- Terminus: Blunt Cove
- Status: unknown

Bond Glacier (66°58′S 109°0′E) is a steep, heavily crevassed glacier to the west of Ivanoff Head, flowing from the continental ice to Blunt Cove at the head of Vincennes Bay. It was mapped from air photos taken by U.S. Navy Operation Highjump (1946–47), and named by the Advisory Committee on Antarctic Names for Captain Charles A. Bond, U.S. Navy, commander of the expedition's Western Group.

== See also ==
- List of glaciers in the Antarctic
- Glaciology
