= Dewart =

Dewart is a surname. Notable people with the surname include:

- Edward Hartley Dewart (1828–1903), Irish-born Canadian Methodist clergyman, author and editor
- Hartley Dewart (1861–1924), Canadian politicians
- Leslie Dewart (1922–2009), Canadian philosopher
- Lewis Dewart (1780–1852), American politician
- Murray Dewart (born 1947), American sculptor
- Sean Dewart, Canadian lawyer
- William Lewis Dewart (1821–1888), American politician
- William Thompson Dewart (1875–?), American publisher

== See also ==
- Dewart Lake, is a natural lake southwest of Syracuse in Kosciusko County, Indiana, United States
- Dewart Island, is the central island in the Frazier Islands, in Vincennes Bay, Wilkes Land, East Antarctica
- Dewart, Pennsylvania, is a census-designated place located in Delaware Township, Northumberland County in the state of Pennsylvania
