= Mallory Point =

Rocky point in Antarctica

Mallory Point (66°49′S 108°39′E) is a steep rocky point close northward of Blunt Cove, projecting from the ice cliffs along the west side of Vincennes Bay, Antarctica. It was first mapped in 1955 by Gardner Dean Blodgett from air photos taken by U.S. Navy Operation Highjump (1947), and was named by the Advisory Committee on Antarctic Names for Ensign Charles W. Mallory, U.S. Navy, a construction officer with U.S. Navy Operation Windmill (1947–48), who gave close support to shore parties that established astronomical control stations from Wilhelm II Coast to Budd Coast.
