= Vanderford =

Vanderford may refer to:

== People ==
- Austin Vanderford (born 1990), American professional mixed martial artist
- Henry Vanderford (1811–1894), American politician and newspaperman from Maryland

== Places ==
- Vanderford Glacier, glacier in Antarctica
- Vanderford Valley, valley near Vanderford Glacier
