= Nelly Island =

Island in Antarctica

- Location within Antarctica

Geography
- Location: Vincennes Bay
- Coordinates: 66°14′S 110°11′E
- Archipelago: Frazier Islands

Administration
- Administered under the Antarctic Treaty System

Demographics
- Population: Uninhabited

Nelly Island is the largest and easternmost of the Frazier Islands, lying in Vincennes Bay off Wilkes Land, East Antarctica.

== History ==
The Frazier Islands were delineated from aerial photographs taken by US Navy's Operation Highjump in February 1947. Nelly Island was visited on 21 January 1956 by a party of the Australian National Antarctic Research Expeditions (ANARE) who established an astronomical control station there. It was so named by ANARE because of the giant petrels, or nellies, nesting there.

== Antarctic Specially Protected Area ==
The island forms part of the Frazier Islands Antarctic Specially Protected Area (ASPA) No.160 because it supports one of only four known breeding colonies of southern giant petrels on continental Antarctica.

== See also ==
- List of Antarctic and subantarctic islands
