= Robinson Glacier =

Glacier in Wilkes Land, Antarctica

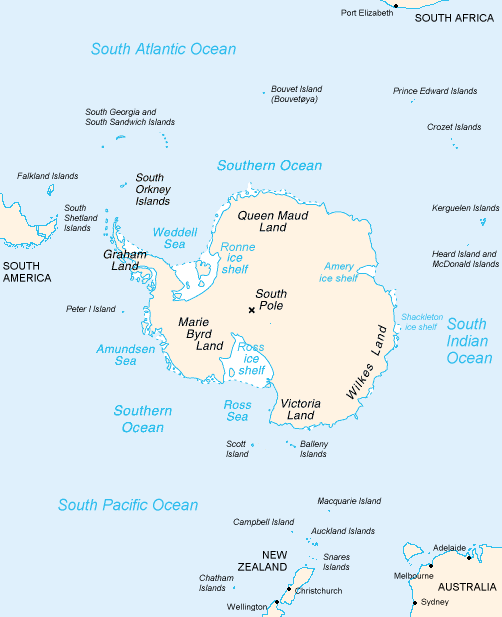
- Map of Antarctica, with Wilkes Land slightly to the right

- Location within Antarctica
- Type: channel
- Location: Wilkes Land
- Coordinates: 66°30′00″S 107°16′00″E
- Length: 8 nautical miles (15 km; 9.2 mi)
- Width: 4 nautical miles (7.4 km; 4.6 mi)
- Thickness: unknown
- Terminus: between Merritt Island and Reist Rocks
- Status: unknown

Robinson Glacier (66°30′S 107°16′E) is a channel glacier flowing to the Antarctic coast between Merritt Island and Reist Rocks. It was mapped in 1955 by Gardner Dean Blodgett from air photos taken by U.S. Navy Operation Highjump (1946–47), and was named by the Advisory Committee on Antarctic Names (US-ACAN) for R.P. Robinson, Purser's Steward of the ship Vincennes on the United States Exploring Expedition under Lieutenant Charles Wilkes, 1838–42.

== See also ==
- List of glaciers in the Antarctic
- Glaciology
