= Snyder Rocks =

Rock formation in Antarctica

Snyder Rocks (66°34′S 107°46′E) is a small group of rocks on the coast about 3 nautical miles (6 km) west of the terminus of Underwood Glacier. First mapped from air photos taken by U.S. Navy Operation Highjump (1946–47). Named by Advisory Committee on Antarctic Names (US-ACAN) for Mark G. Snyder, who assisted U.S. Navy Operation Windmill (1947–48) parties in establishing astronomical control stations along Wilhelm II, Knox and Budd coasts.
