= Cape Folger =

Ice-covered cape in Antarctica

Cape Folger (66°8′S 110°44′E) is an ice-covered cape forming the east side of the entrance to Vincennes Bay on the Budd Coast of Antarctica. The position of Cape Folger correlates closely with the west end of Charles Wilkes' "Budd's High Land", as charted as a coastal landfall by the United States Exploring Expedition in 1840. The cape was mapped from aerial photographs taken by U.S. Navy Operation Highjump, 1946–47, and was named by the Advisory Committee on Antarctic Names for Commander Edward C. Folger, Jr., U.S. Navy, commander of the icebreaker Edisto which assisted Operation Windmill parties in establishing astronomical control stations in the Windmill Islands, close southwest in Vincennes Bay.
