= Charlton Island, Antarctica =

Island in Antarctica

Charlton Island
- Location within Antarctica

Geography
- Location: Antarctica
- Coordinates: 66°13′S 110°9′E

Administration
- Administered under the Antarctic Treaty System

Demographics
- Population: Uninhabited

Charlton Island is the westernmost of the Frazier Islands, lying in Vincennes Bay off Wilkes Land in East Antarctica.

== History ==
The island was mapped from air photographs taken in the course of the US Navy's Operations Highjump (1946–47) and Windmill (1947-48). It was named by Carl R. Eklund for Chief Electronics Technician Frederick E. Charlton, of the Wilkes Station party, 1957.

== Antarctic Specially Protected Area ==
The island forms part of the Frazier Islands Antarctic Specially Protected Area (ASPA) No.160 because it supports one of only four known breeding colonies of southern giant petrels on continental Antarctica.

== See also ==
- List of Antarctic and subantarctic islands
