= Frazier Islands =

Group of islands in Antarctica

- Location within Antarctica

Geography
- Location: Antarctica
- Coordinates: 66°13′S 110°10′E

Administration
- Administered under the Antarctic Treaty System

Demographics
- Population: Uninhabited

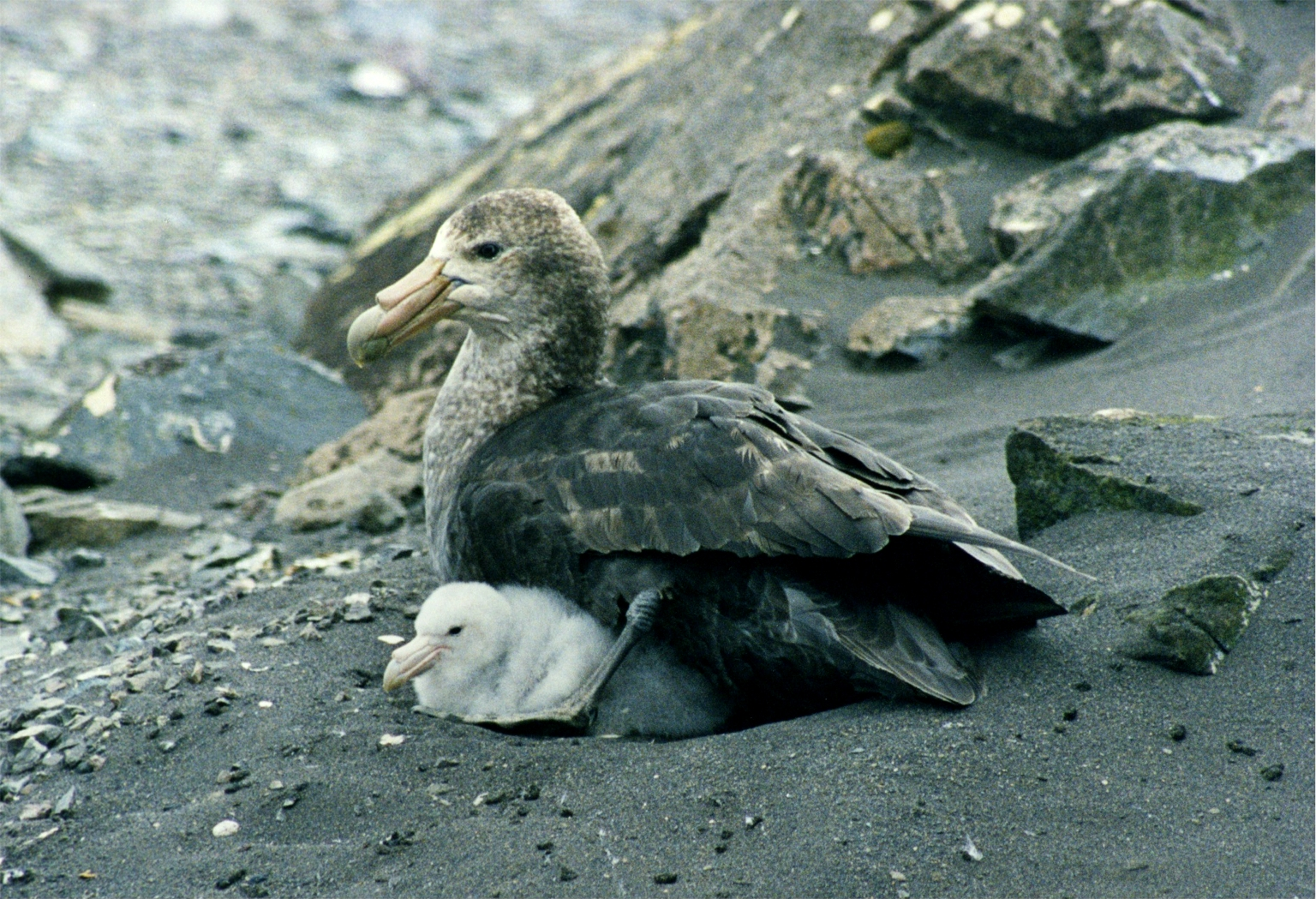
The islands are important nesting sites for southern giant petrels

The Frazier Islands are a group of three rocky islands - Nelly, Dewart and Charlton - in the eastern part of Vincennes Bay, East Antarctica, 15 km (9 mi) west-north-west of Clark Peninsula, and 16 km offshore from Australia's Casey Station.

== History ==
The islands were first photographed from the air in the course of the US Navy's Operation Highjump, 1946–47. They were named by the Advisory Committee on Antarctic Names for Commander Paul W. Frazier, a navigator and projects officer with Operation Windmill who visited the area in January 1948, and later served as operations officer with Operation Deepfreeze I at Little America V.

== Antarctic Specially Protected Area ==
The islands are protected under the Antarctic Treaty System as Antarctic Specially Protected Area (ASPA) No.160 because they support the largest of only four known breeding colonies of southern giant petrels on continental Antarctica.

== See also ==
- List of Antarctic and subantarctic islands
