= Kimberly Rogers =

Canadian fraudster (1961–2001)

- Born: c. 1961
- Died: 9 August 2001 (aged 39–40); Sudbury, Ontario, Canada
- Occupation: Student
- Status: Deceased
- Conviction: Fraud
- Criminal charges: Fraud
- Penalty: House arrest, repayment

Kimberly Rogers (c. 1961 – 9 August 2001) was a Canadian woman whose suicide in 2001, while under house arrest for a disputed welfare fraud conviction, caused extensive controversy around Ontario Works, the Ontario government's welfare system. Rogers' death led to an inquest which recommended significant changes to the Ontario welfare system.

== Background ==
A resident of Sudbury, Rogers was receiving standard Ontario welfare benefits of $520 per month for a single person, while paying $450 per month in rent. From 1996 to 1999, she also received a total of $49,000 in student loans from the Ontario Student Assistance Program (OSAP) to study social services at the city's Cambrian College and illegally received $13,500 in welfare over that same 3-year period. Rogers graduated with a grade point average (GPA) of 3.5.

When Rogers first began her studies, receiving both welfare and student loans was legal, but the practice was banned in 1996 by the Progressive Conservative government of Mike Harris as part of its welfare reform legislation. Rogers continued to receive both welfare and student loans after the practice became illegal. There was no evidence that she was ever informed of the change in regulations.

In the fall of 1999, the welfare office learned of her student loans, and ordered Rogers to repay $13,486 in benefits. After her welfare was reinstated, the overpayment was automatically deducted from her monthly welfare cheque. This left Rogers with $18 each month after paying her rent and the student loans. As well, she was facing criminal charges for welfare fraud.

== Trial ==
On 25 April 2001, Rogers pleaded guilty to fraud before Justice Greg Rodgers of the Ontario Court of Justice. Justice Greg Rodgers stated that she had engaged in "almost four years of deception and dishonesty."

"I am satisfied you did not lead an opulent lifestyle, even with these two sources of income," Justice Rodgers said in his verdict, "but welfare is there for people who need it, not for people who want it, who want things and who want money."

Rogers, who was pregnant at the time of her trial, was sentenced to six months of house arrest, permitted to leave the house for medical, religious or shopping reasons only on Wednesday mornings, and for a maximum of three hours. She was also ordered to repay the full amount of her overpayment.

With the fraud conviction, Ontario Works suspended her welfare benefits for six months.

== House arrest ==
With no source of income, Rogers' landlord temporarily agreed to reduce her rent to $300 a month. Community groups such as the Elizabeth Fry Society and the Social Planning Council of Greater Sudbury rallied to find food and financial assistance for her. Her doctor lobbied the government to have drug benefits which had previously been covered by welfare reinstated because Rogers was unable to pay for her prescribed medications, including antidepressants and drugs to alleviate pregnancy-related nausea.

Sean Dewart, a Toronto lawyer, launched a constitutional appeal on Rogers' behalf, successfully having Rogers' welfare suspension reversed by Justice Gloria Epstein. On 31 May 2001, Epstein ruled that "for a member of our community carrying an unborn child to be homeless and deprived of basic sustenance is a situation that would adversely affect the public – its dignity, its human rights commitments and its health care resources."

== Death ==
Rogers' body was found in her apartment 11 August 2001 by her boyfriend, Terry Pyhtila. Eight months pregnant, she had been dead for several days in an apartment without air conditioning. At the time, Sudbury was subject to a record-breaking heat wave, with six days of temperatures over 30 degrees Celsius, during the week of Rogers' death. A formal inquest was convened in October 2002.

== Inquest ==
On its first day, the inquest was informed that the actual cause of Rogers' death was suicide by an amitriptyline overdose, and that Rogers may have altered her antidepressant prescription to ensure that she had a sufficient supply of medication to constitute a lethal dose. However, they were asked to review the impact of the government's welfare fraud policy on Rogers' decision to commit suicide.

On 19 December 2002, the jury delivered its decision. Their first recommendation was that the lifetime suspension of benefits should be eliminated – temporary suspension would still be permitted as a penalty, but could no longer be imposed retroactively on a person whose fraud conviction predated the adoption of the legislation.

The jury also indicated that suspension and/or prosecution should not necessarily be automatic, but that each case should be evaluated by Ontario Works administrators and/or a stakeholder committee to determine the most appropriate response to the individual situation. As well, the jury ruled that drug benefits should not be suspended even when regular benefits were, that Ontario Works should make more effort to uncover fraud situations earlier so that the penalties had less emotional and financial impact on the recipient, and that the government should review the adequacy of social assistance rates, which until then had not been raised since the Harris government cut the rate to $520 per month in 1996.

As well, the jury made several recommendations to other government ministries. They ruled that the government had a responsibility to ensure that a person under house arrest had access to adequate shelter, food and medication, as well as an obligation to help individuals on probation or parole locate the appropriate community services to assist their adjustment back into society. They also recommended improved communication between government departments, in response to evidence that Justice Rodgers had not known that a fraud conviction would lead to a suspension of Kimberly Rogers' benefits, and clearer communication to citizens of both the definition and the potential consequences of welfare fraud.

The jury also recommended several improvements in the province's medical system to prevent potential abuse, including the creation of a computer database network to improve pharmacies' access to a patient's prior prescription records. Doctors would also be asked to write out prescriptions in both number and text in order to reduce the possibility of prescriptions being altered, and to review the use of tricyclic antidepressants.

== Aftermath ==
The government of Ernie Eves did not implement any of the Rogers inquest's recommendations before it was defeated in the 2003 provincial election. Community and Social Services Minister Brenda Elliott dismissed the recommendations as unnecessary tinkering with a system that "was working effectively". In early 2004, the government of Dalton McGuinty implemented a three per cent increase in welfare rates, to be followed by an annual cost of living increase, and eliminated the lifetime suspension of benefits. However, the McGuinty government never implemented most of the inquest's other recommendations.

Social Planning Council of Greater Sudbury chair Janet Gasparini, who had been a prominent media commentator in the Rogers case, was elected to Greater Sudbury City Council in the 2003 municipal election.
