= Adams Glacier =

Adams Glacier may refer to:

- Adams Glacier (Mount Adams), Washington, US
- Adams Glacier (Wilkes Land), Antarctica
- Adams Glacier (Victoria Land), Antarctica
- Adams Glacier (New Zealand)
