= Brooks Point =

Headland in Antarctica

Brooks Point (66°45′S 108°25′E) is a small rock headland on the west shore of Vincennes Bay, about 5 nautical miles (9 km) west-northwest of Mallory Point. This feature was first mapped from air photos taken by U.S. Navy Operation Highjump, 1946–47. It was named by the Advisory Committee on Antarctic Names for John Brooks, a seaman on the United States Exploring Expedition flagship USS Vincennes under Charles Wilkes, 1838–42. This 1972 naming resolves the problem raised by displacement of the name "Brooks Island" (now Ivanoff Head).
