= Underwood Glacier =

Glacier in Wilkes Land, Antarctica

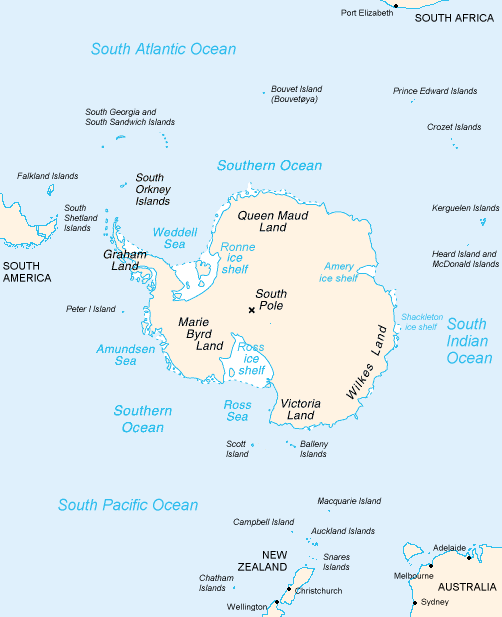
- Map of Antarctica, with Wilkes Land slightly to the right

- Location within Antarctica
- Type: channel
- Location: Wilkes Land
- Coordinates: 66°35′00″S 108°00′00″E
- Length: 15 nautical miles (28 km; 17 mi)
- Thickness: unknown
- Terminus: between Reist Rocks and Cape Nutt
- Status: unknown

Underwood Glacier (66°35′S 108°0′E) is a channel glacier in Wilkes Land, Antarctica about 15 nautical miles (28 km; 17 mi) long, flowing to the Antarctic coast between Reist Rocks and Cape Nutt. It was mapped in 1955 by G. D. Blodgett from aerial photographs taken by U.S. Navy Operation Highjump in 1947 and named by Advisory Committee on Antarctic Names (US-ACAN) after Lieutenant Thomas Joseph Underwood, Jr., USMC, who served on the sloop Vincennes of the United States Exploring Expedition (1838–42) under Lieutenant Charles Wilkes.

== See also ==
- List of glaciers in the Antarctic
- Glaciology
