= Mare Island =

Peninsula in California, United States

Mare Island Isla de la Yegua (Spanish)
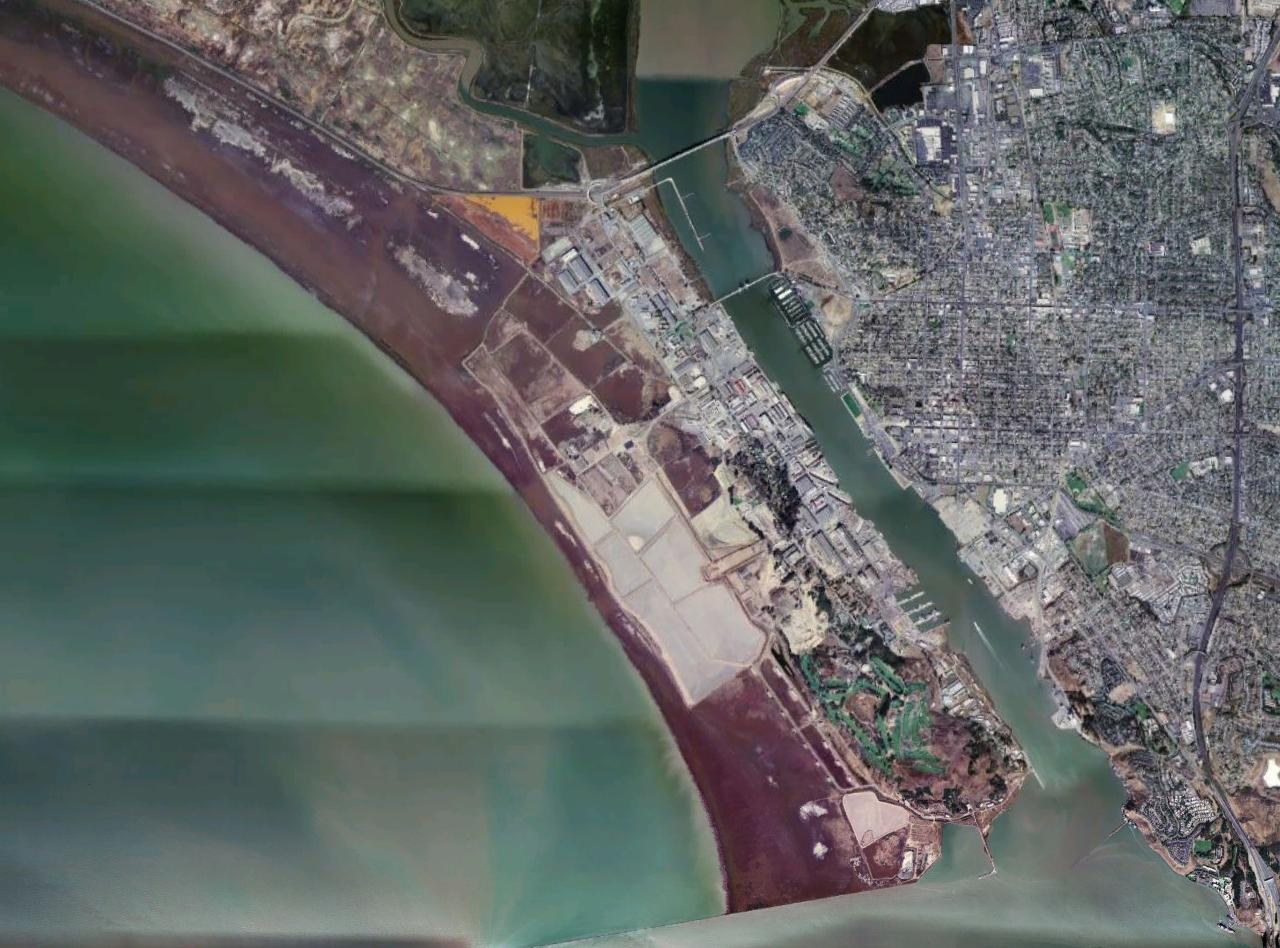
- Stitched aerial photos of the southern part of Mare Island

- Location within San Francisco Bay Area Location within California Location within the United States

Geography
- Location: Northern California
- Coordinates: 38.095254°N 122.278004°W
- Adjacent to: San Francisco Bay

Administration
- United States
- State: California
- County: Solano
- City: Vallejo

Mare Island (Spanish: Isla de la Yegua) is a peninsula in the United States in the city of Vallejo, California, about 23 miles (37 km) northeast of San Francisco. The Napa River forms its eastern side as it enters the Carquinez Strait juncture with the east side of San Pablo Bay. Mare Island is a peninsula, as no full body of water separates this or several other named "islands" from the mainland. Instead, a series of small sloughs cause seasonal water-flows among the so-called islands. Mare Island is the largest of these at about 3.5 miles (5.6 km) long and a mile wide.

== History ==
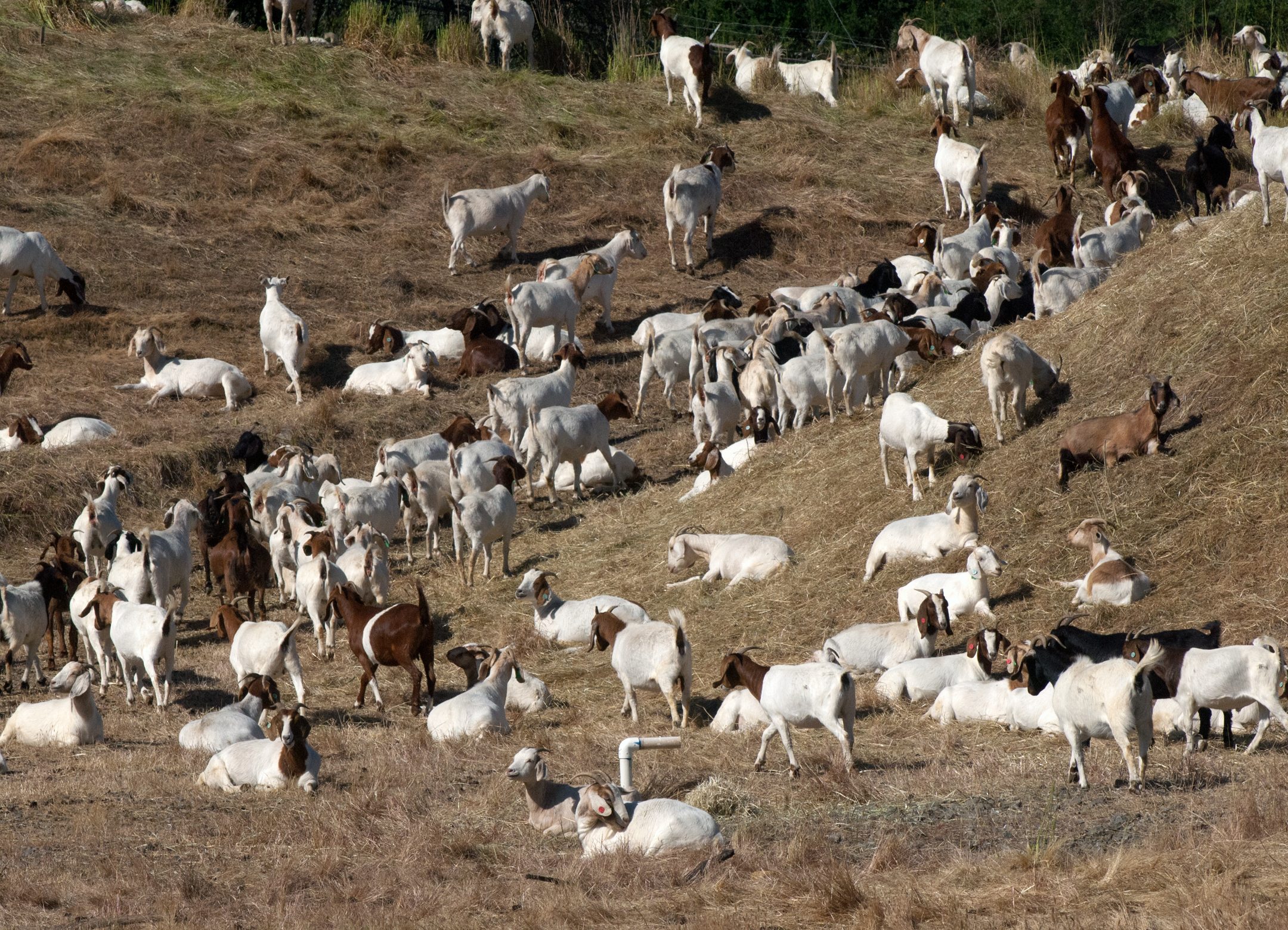
Goats graze on Mare Island in 2011.

In 1775, Spanish explorer Perez Ayala was the first European to land on what would become Mare Island – he named it Isla de la Plana. This area was part of Rancho Suscol, deeded to General Mariano Guadalupe Vallejo in 1844. It became a waypoint for early settlers. In 1835, whilst traversing the Carquinez Strait, a crude ferry transporting men and livestock capsized in a squall. Among the livestock feared lost in the wreckage was the prized white mare of General Mariano Guadalupe Vallejo, the Mexican Commandante for Northern California. Several days later, General Vallejo's mare was found on the island, having swum ashore. Grateful for the fortunate turn of events, he renamed the island to Isla de la Yegua, Spanish for Mare Island, in her honor. It is shown, labeled "Mare Island", on an 1850 survey map of the San Francisco Bay area made by Cadwalader Ringgold and an 1854 map of the area by Henry Lange. In 1892, development of the Mare Island Golf Club began, making it the oldest golf course west of the Mississippi.

== Shipyard ==
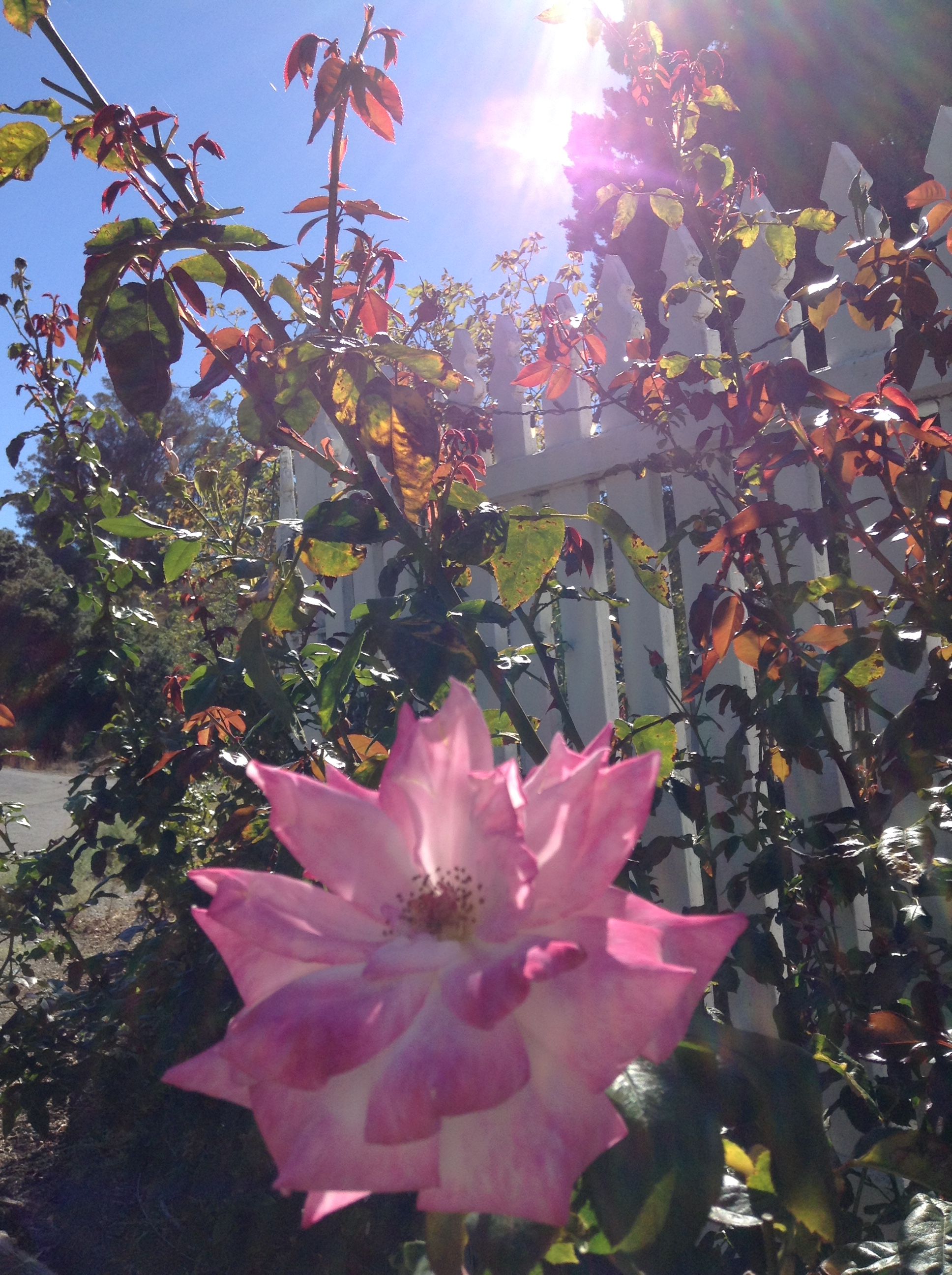
A flower along the fence of the Mare Island Cemetery

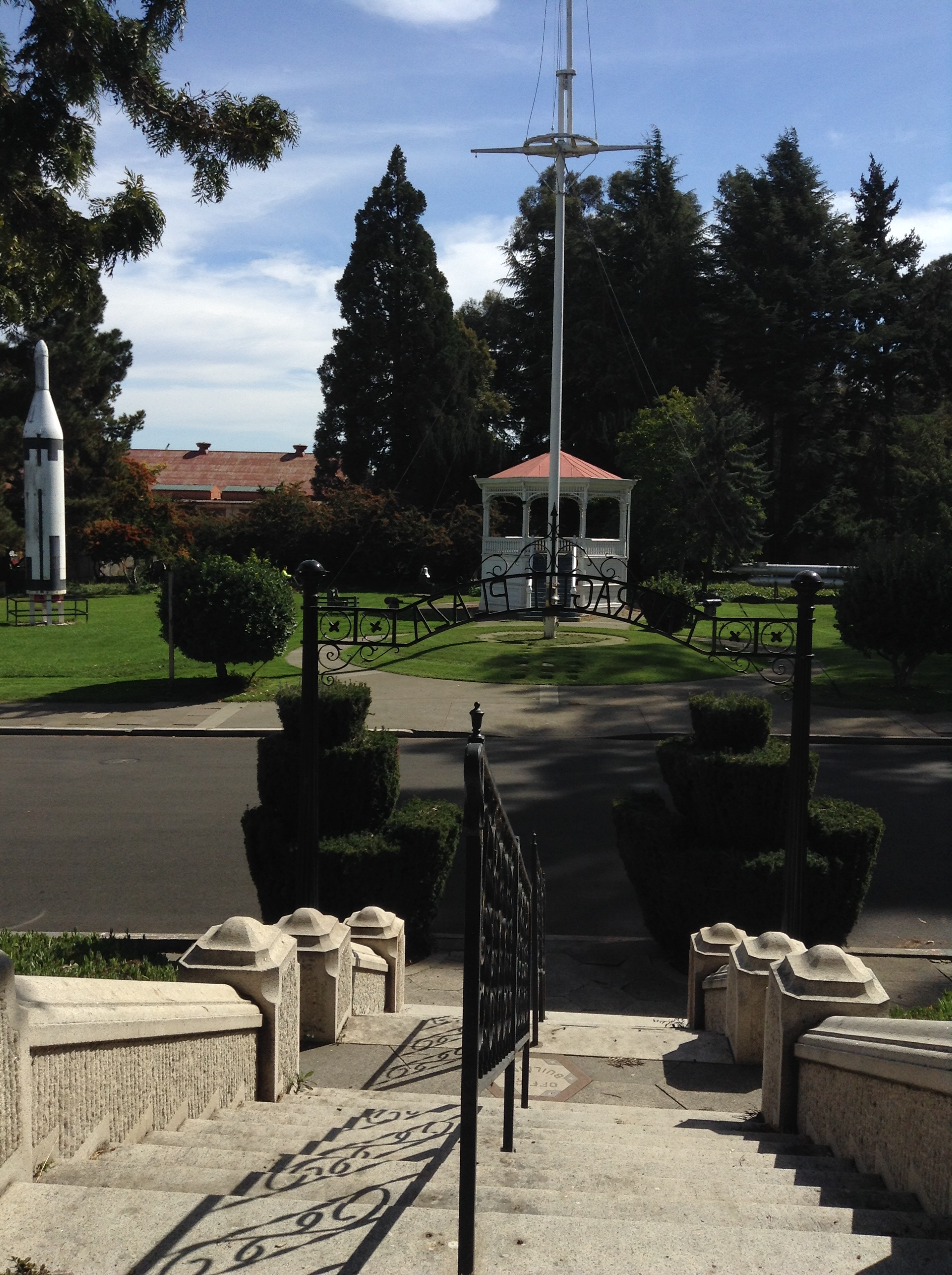
Looking down the steps across the street from Alden Park

On November 6, 1850, two months after California was admitted to statehood, President Fillmore reserved Mare Island for government use.

On January 15, 1852, Secretary of the Navy William Alexander Graham ordered a Naval Commission to select a site for a Naval Yard on the Pacific Coast. Commodore D. Sloat along with Commodore C. Ringgold, Simon F. Blunt and William P.S. Sanger (former overseer of construction of Drydock Number One, Norfolk Naval Shipyard) were appointed to the commission. On July 13, 1852, Sloat recommended the island across the Napa River from the settlement of Vallejo, as it was "free from ocean gales and from floods and freshets." The Navy Department acted favorably on Commodore Sloat's recommendations and Mare Island was purchased for use as a naval shipyard in July 1853 at a cost of $83,410. On September 16, 1854, Mare Island became the first permanent U.S. naval installation on the west coast, with Commodore David Farragut, as Mare Island's first commander.

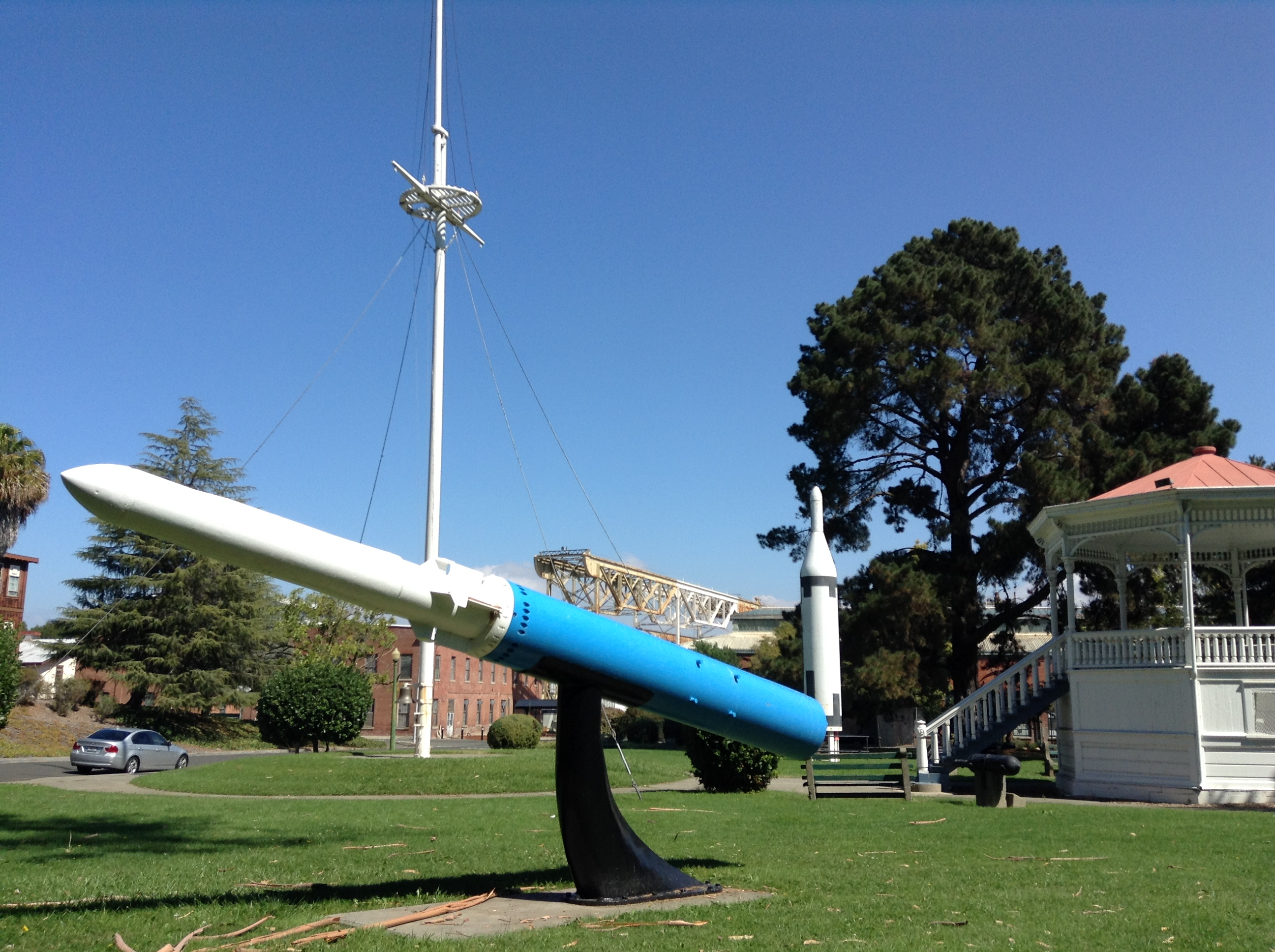
The gazebo, Subroc missile and flag pole in Alden Park on Mare Island

For over a century, Mare Island hosted the Navy's Mare Island Naval Shipyard. The growing size and number of the country's naval fleet was making older facilities obsolete and led to increased building and refitting of shipyards nationally. In 1872, the U.S. Public Works Department commenced construction of a 508-foot (155 m) drydock on the island, setting it on a foundation of cut granite blocks. The work was completed in 1891. A second drydock was begun in 1899, a concrete structure 740 feet (230 m) long set on wooden piles; it was completed in 1910. By 1941 a third drydock had been completed and drydock number four was under construction. The ammunition depot and submarine repair base were modern, fireproof buildings. A million dollar, three-way vehicle causeway to Vallejo replaced a ferry service.

During World War I, a rapid expansion of the Mare Island shipbuilding facilities created a housing shortage for wartime production workers. In response, the United States Housing Corporation planned and built a new residential community adjacent to the shipyard, with over 400 houses and community-serving structures.

Before World War II, Mare Island had been in a continual state of up-building. By 1941, new projects included improvements to the central power plant, a new pattern storage building, a large foundry, machine shop, magazine building, paint shop, new administration building, and a huge storehouse. The yard was expected to be able to repair and paint six to eight large naval vessels at a time. Several finger piers had recently been built, as well as a new shipbuilding wharf, adding one 500-foot (150 m) and a 750-foot (230 m) berth. It employed 5593 workers at the beginning of 1939, and rapidly increased to 18,500 by May 1941, with a monthly payroll of $3.5 million. In 1941, the drafting department had expanded to three buildings accommodating over 400 naval architects, engineers and draftsmen. The hospital had 584 beds. During World War II, the shipyard employed up to 50,000 workers.

In 1969, the Navy transferred its (Vietnam War) Brown Water Navy Riverine Training Forces from Coronado, California, to Mare Island. Swift Boats (Patrol Craft Fast-PCF), and PBRs (Patrol Boat, River) conducted boat operations throughout the currently named Napa-Sonoma Marshes State Wildlife Area, on the north and west portions of Mare Island. Mare Island Naval Base was deactivated during the 1995 cycle of US base closures, but the U.S. Navy Reserves still have access to the water portions of the State Wildlife Area for any riverine warfare training being conducted from their new base in Sacramento, California.

The USS Guitarro, a Sturgeon-class submarine, SSN-665, was constructed at Mare Island between December 9, 1964, and July 27, 1968. On May 15, 1969, while still under construction and tied to the pier, the Guitarro was flooded and sank when construction crews mismanaged testing procedures. It took three days to raise her and many months to salvage her.

During the latter years of Mare Island's military use, U.S. Marines were trained for Security Management and Security Force Operations, including F.A.S.T. (Fleet Anti-Terrorism Team), Security Guards, and Security Force Reaction Forces. In the 1970s, Navy technical training schools included those for Data Systems Technicians (DSs), Firecontrol Technicians (FTs), Communications Technicians (CTs), and nuclear power ratings of many types.

== Restoration and reuse ==
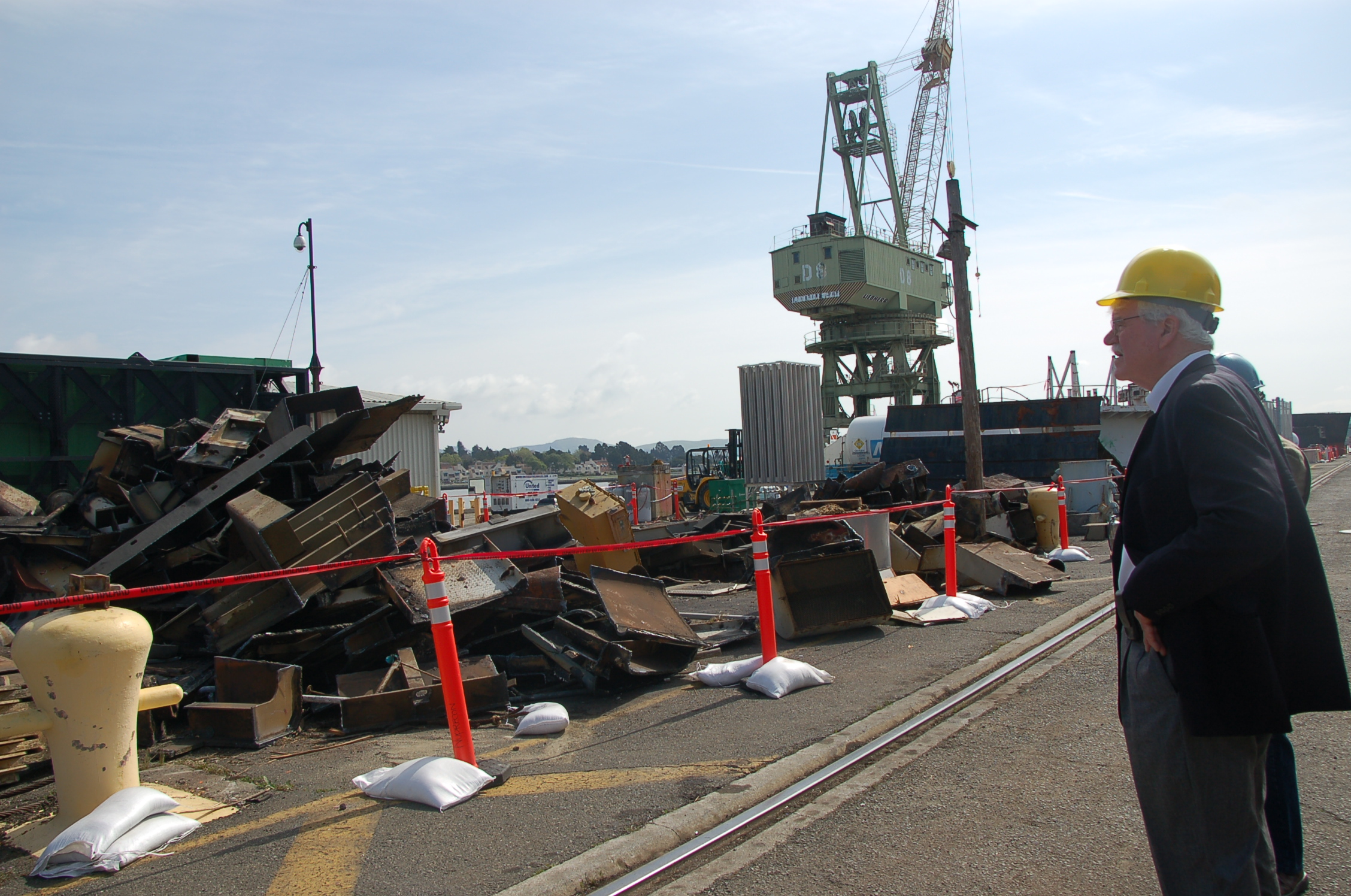
Congressman George Miller on Mare Island in 2011.

In 1993 Congress approved the findings of the Base Realignment and Closure report, leading to the closure of Mare Island Naval Shipyard. The shipyard had long been the economic engine of the city of Vallejo, employing 10,000 workers after reductions in 1988. When Congress ordered the base closure, the shipyard employed 5,800 workers.

The vision of rebuilding Mare Island as a vital place where people lived and worked was a key goal in the base conversion planning process undertaken by the city of Vallejo in the early 1990s. After the base was recommended for closure in 1993, the City undertook an extensive community-based reuse planning process, which resulted in a Final Reuse Plan that was approved by the Vallejo City Council in 1994. The Final Reuse Plan laid out the general vision for the Island's redevelopment. The Reuse Plan was the basis for the Mare Island Specific Plan, which was approved in 1999 and amended in 2005 and 2007. The Mare Island Specific Plan designated land uses and established development standards for identified reuse areas and provided an implementation program to guide all subsequent planning activities.

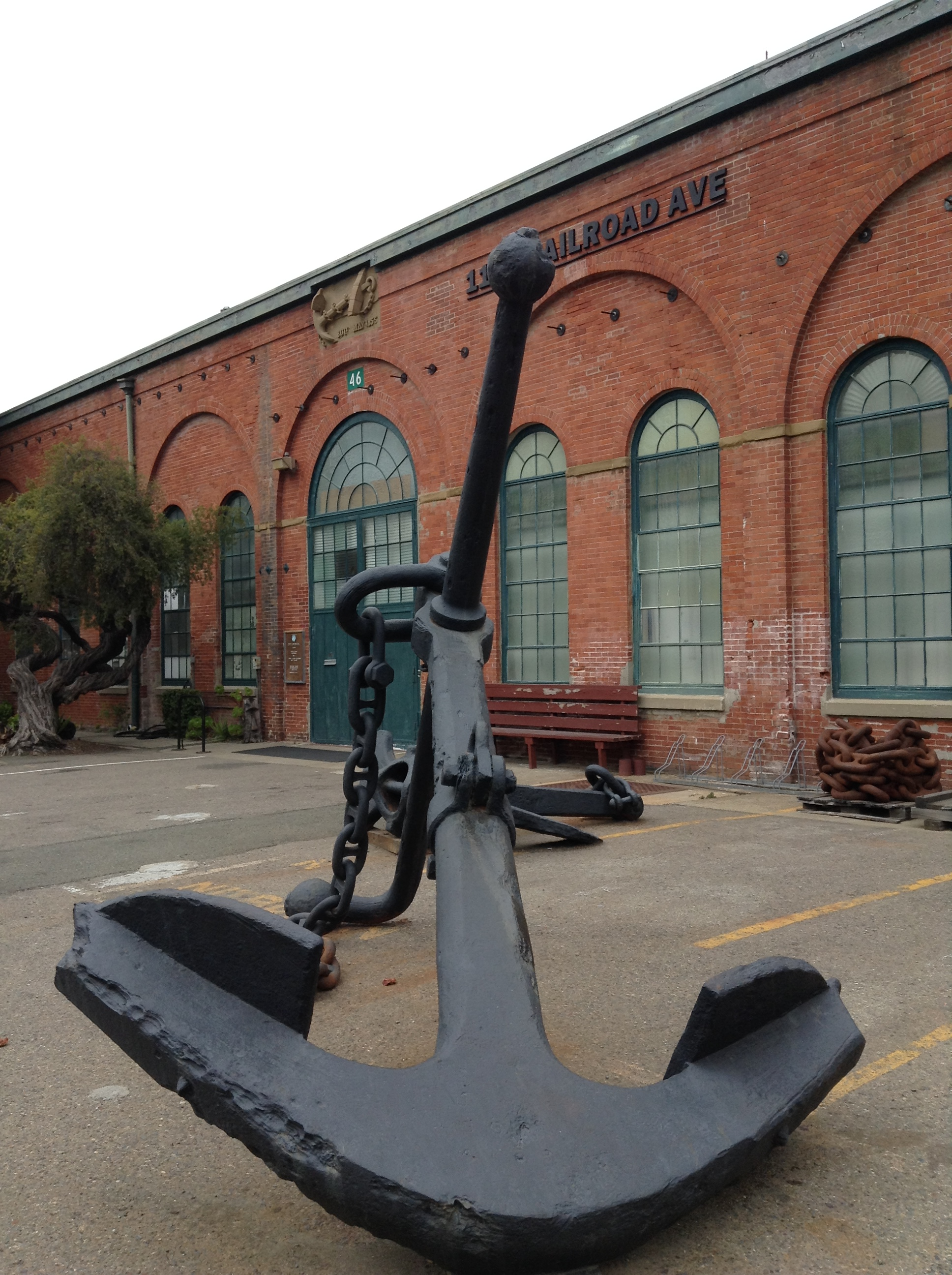
An anchor sits on the exterior of Building 46 which houses the Mare Island Naval and Historical Museum

Preservation of many of Mare Island's 661 structures and other cultural resources was an additional factor in the planning process. As the oldest shipyard and naval facility on the West Coast, the shipyard earned a National Historic Landmark designation by the federal government in 1975. In 1979 California listed the entire naval base as a State Historical Landmark. In 1999 the city of Vallejo added Mare Island to the National Register of Historic Districts with 42 individual city landmarks.

Finally, as with any restoration of an industrial, brownfield landscape, both city and government agencies required environmental reviews, toxic substance removal, and soil remediation.

In 1998, Vallejo contracted with Lennar Mare Island LLC (LMI) to develop 650 acres (263 ha) of the eastern portion of Mare Island into a multi-use community. LMI contracted the Sausalito-based SWA Group to provide a Master Development Plan for Vallejo, additional historical research and landscape architectural services.

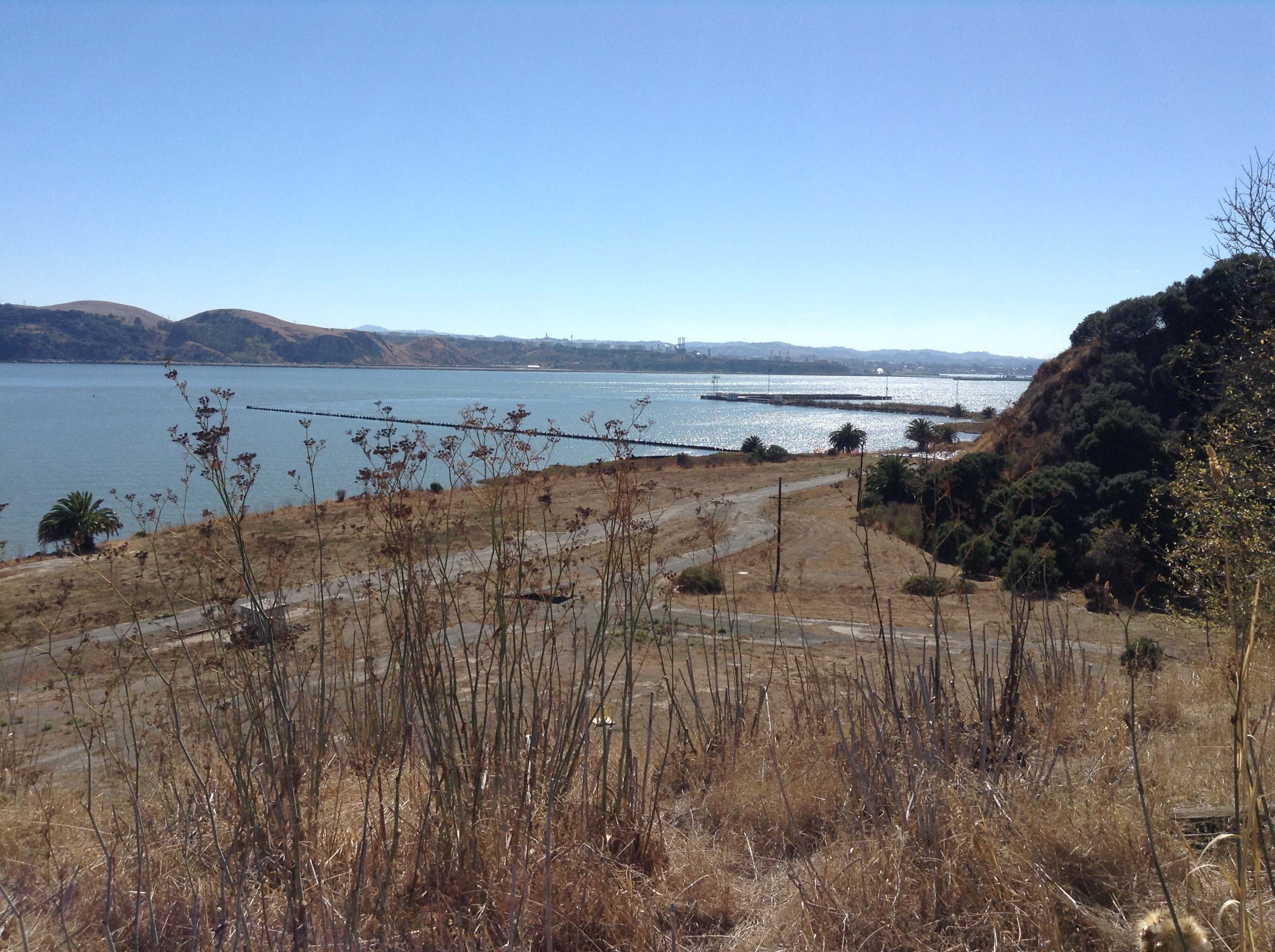
The Napa River from the Mare Island Preserve

The Specific Plan included a variety of land uses, including a university district, an industrial zone, historic core, and residential neighborhoods. In addition, 78% of the island was set aside for wildlife habitat and wetlands, parkland and open space, and dredge ponds. In 2007, LMI finished construction on the residential neighborhoods. Farragut Village, with 277 homes, was the first completed neighborhood. Additional neighborhoods include Coral Sea and Kirkland Isle II. Mare Island's Specific Plan calls for a total of 1,400 homes and condos, plus 7,000,000 square feet (650,000 m^{2}) of commercial, retail, entertainment, and industrial space.

Mare Island's residents petitioned LMI and the City of Vallejo to eliminate the dredge ponds, whose role had been to collect silt, drainage, and storm water from the Napa River and the Bay, and instead restore that acreage to wetlands. The city and the developer agreed, and in January 2006, the land use plan was amended to add the Mare Island Shoreline Heritage Preserve. An advisory board was appointed by the city to restore the 215-acre (0.87 km^{2}) site into publicly accessible parkland.

In 2009, Alstom moved its train maintenance facility from Oakland to Mare Island. In 2024, Alstom announced plans to close the facility in early 2025 and lay off 27 workers.

== Location in films and television ==
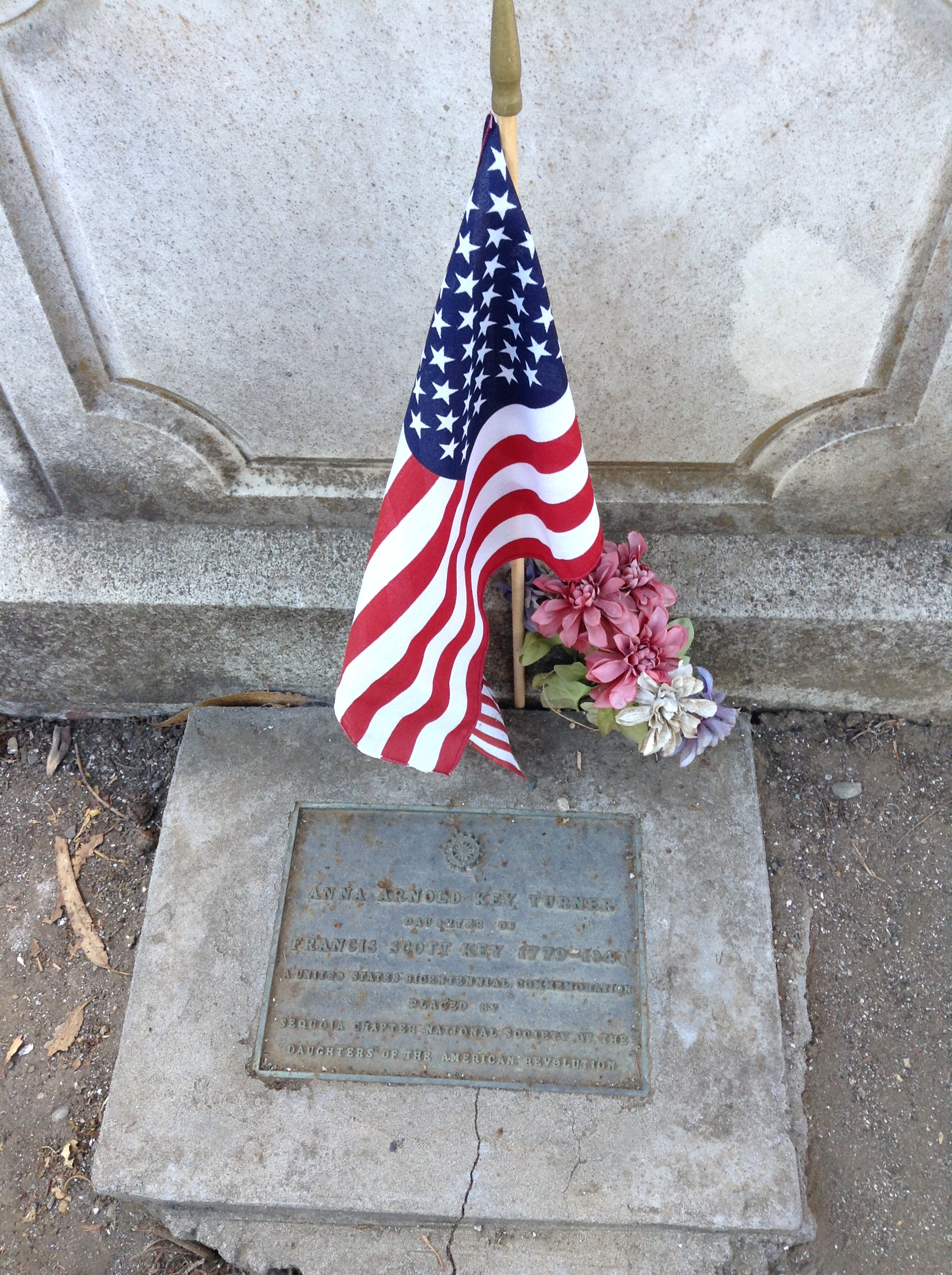
Anna Arnold Key gravestone in 2015 on Mare Island

- In 1917 Charlie Chaplin, Douglas Fairbanks and then heavyweight boxing contender, Jack Dempsey make a silent film with soldiers based on Mare Island, including a staged fight between Chaplin and Dempsey as Fairbanks plays double duty as both a military bandleader and the fight referee. – (Source- 1964 Chaplin documentary film "The Funniest Man in the World.")
- In the 1943 war film Destination Tokyo starring Cary Grant, Mare Island cranes and the dockside are prominent in the beginning along with shots of the Vallejo coast line.
- In the 1953 film Submarine Command starring William Holden, a major portion is filmed on Mare Island with some shots of Vallejo.
- The cast and crew of the 2012 Paul Thomas Anderson film The Master shot on Mare Island for a month. The final product included scenes of a hospital and an admirals mansion.
- In the 1997 action film Metro starring Eddie Murphy, Scott Roper (Murphy) is instructed by Korda (Michael Wincott) to bring $10 million in stolen jewelry to Mare Island in order to save his girlfriend.
- Reality television series Battlebots's sixth season was shot on at the Mare Island Sports Center from May 21–23, 2015.
- St. Vincent (musician) recorded her 2011 music video for "Cruel" around Mare Island.
- An old warehouse building, known as Building 1310, is frequently used as interior stages for several projects. From 2016 to 2019, the location was used for the Netflix teen drama 13 Reasons Why, as well as the 2018 Transformers film Bumblebee.

== Transportation ==
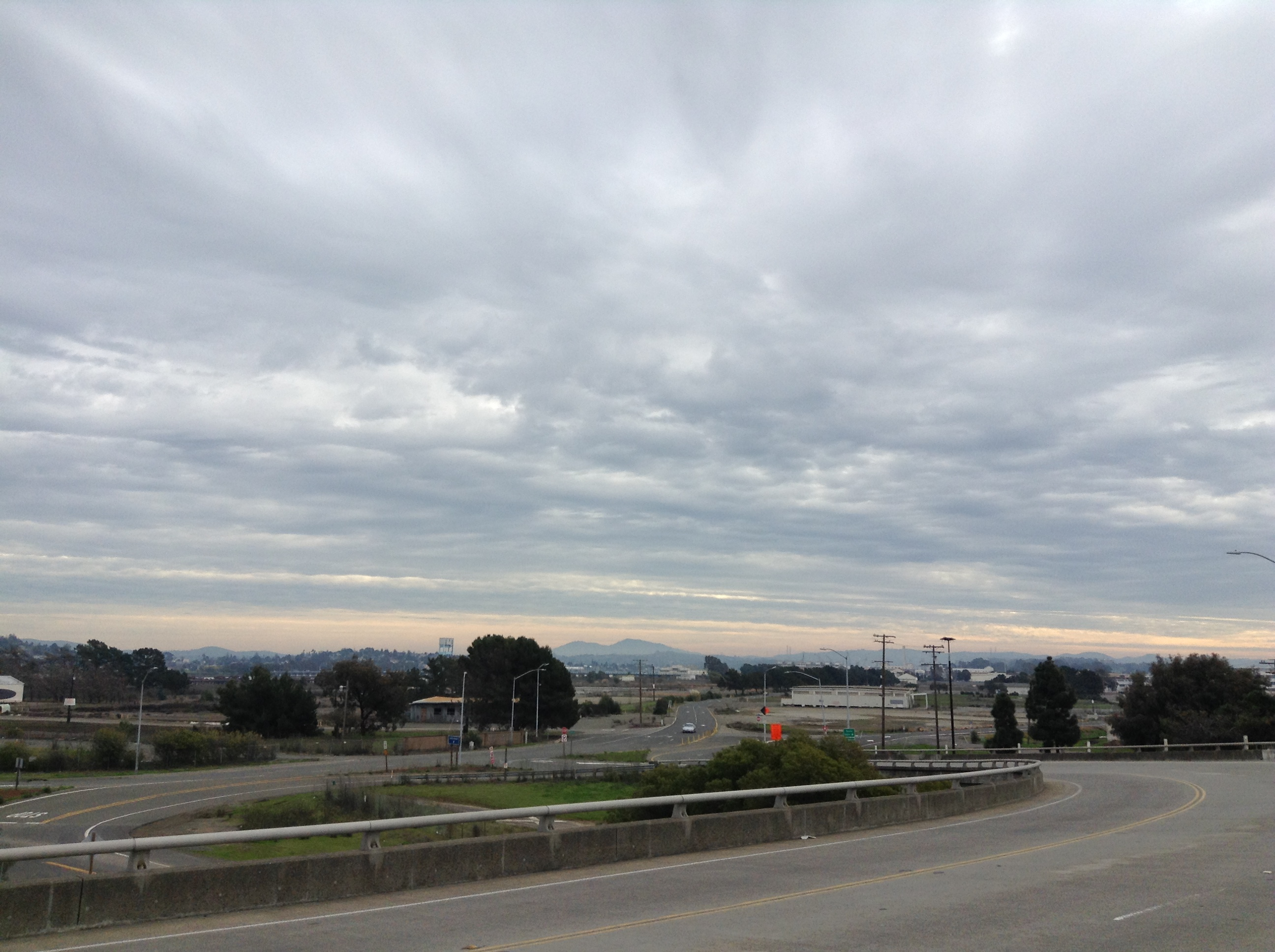
Looking at Mare Island from California State Route 37 pedestrian bridge

Mare Island is accessed by State Route 37 on its north side, as well as by Interstate 80 via the Wichels Causeway (popularly the Mare Island Causeway) and Tennessee Street. The causeway also has rails embedded in the roadway to allow access for trains. The San Francisco Bay Ferry provides year-round weekday and weekend service, and service on select holidays, between Mare Island, Vallejo, and the San Francisco Ferry Building or Pier 41 terminals.

Mare Island is the location of Touro University California, the US Forest Service Pacific Southwest Regional Office, and the administrative offices of the Vallejo City Unified School District.

== Climate ==
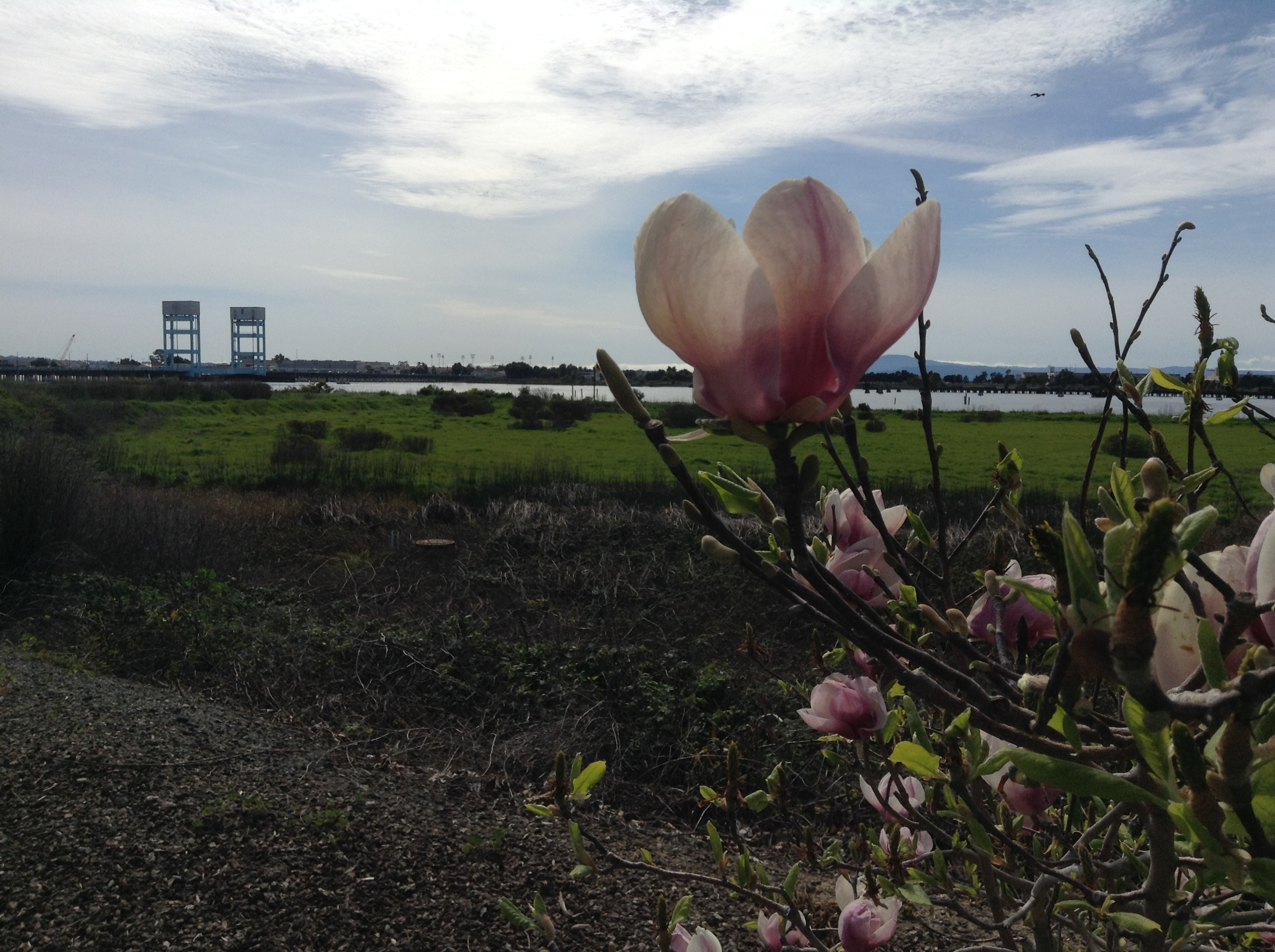
Flowers grow beside Mare Island Way, looking out at the Mare Island Bridge

This region experiences warm (but not hot) and dry summers, with no average monthly temperatures above 71.6 °F. According to the Köppen Climate Classification system, Mare Island has a warm-summer Mediterranean climate, abbreviated "Csb" on climate maps.

== See also ==
- 1898 Mare Island earthquake
- Mare Island Light
- Mare Island Naval Shipyard
- Mare Island Naval Shipyard Airfield
- Mare Island San Pablo Bay Trail
- Mare Island Strait
