= Mare Island San Pablo Bay Trail =

U.S. walking trail

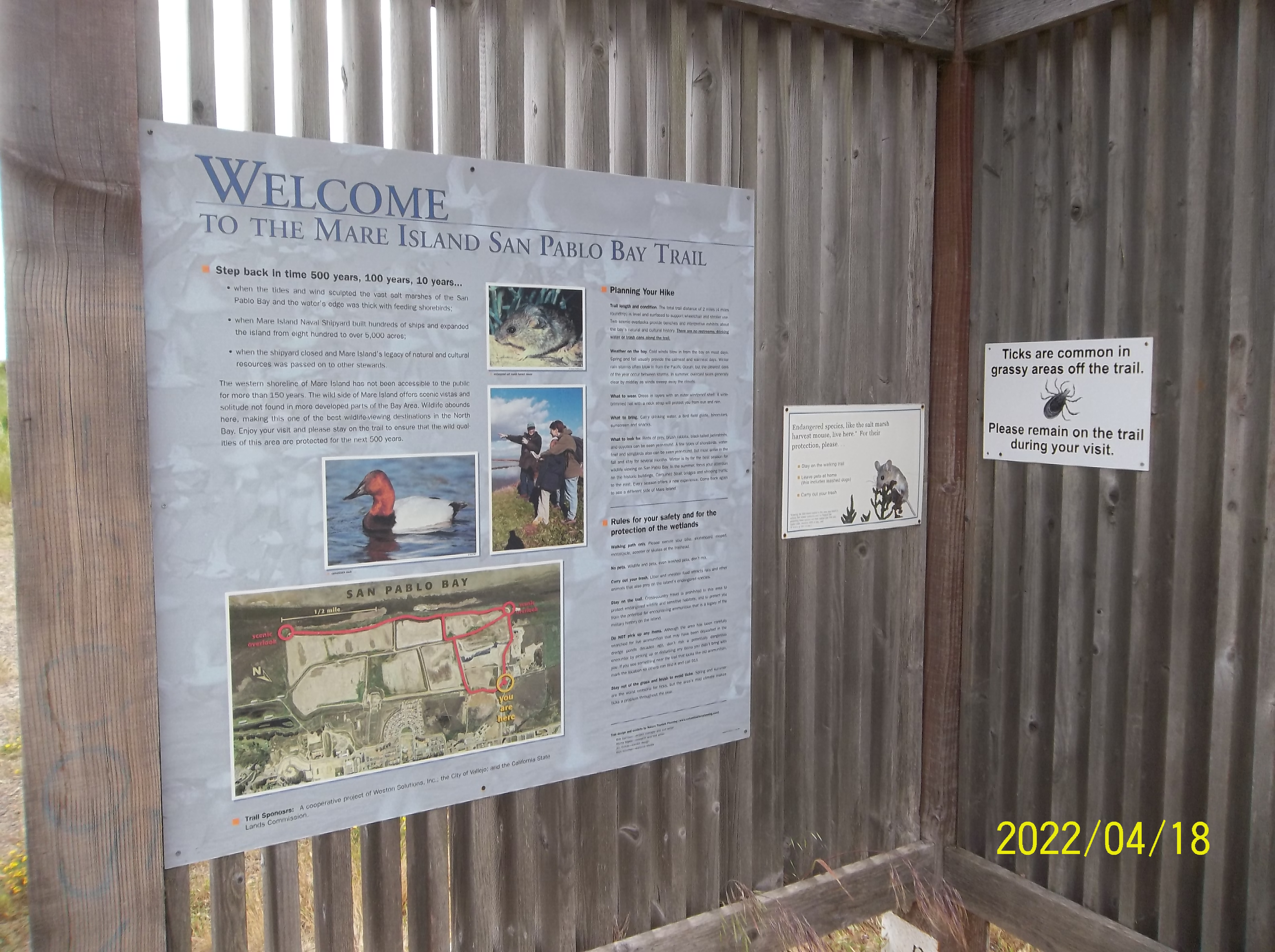
Information sign at the trailhead

The Mare Island San Pablo Bay Trail is a walking trail on Mare Island in Vallejo, California.

It runs along the west side of Mare Island, near San Pablo Bay. It has views of the bay and mountains, including Mount Diablo and Mount Tamalpais.

The trail encircles a U. S. Navy Base Realignment and Closure Investigation Area.

The trail has been lit for holiday events.

== Gallery ==
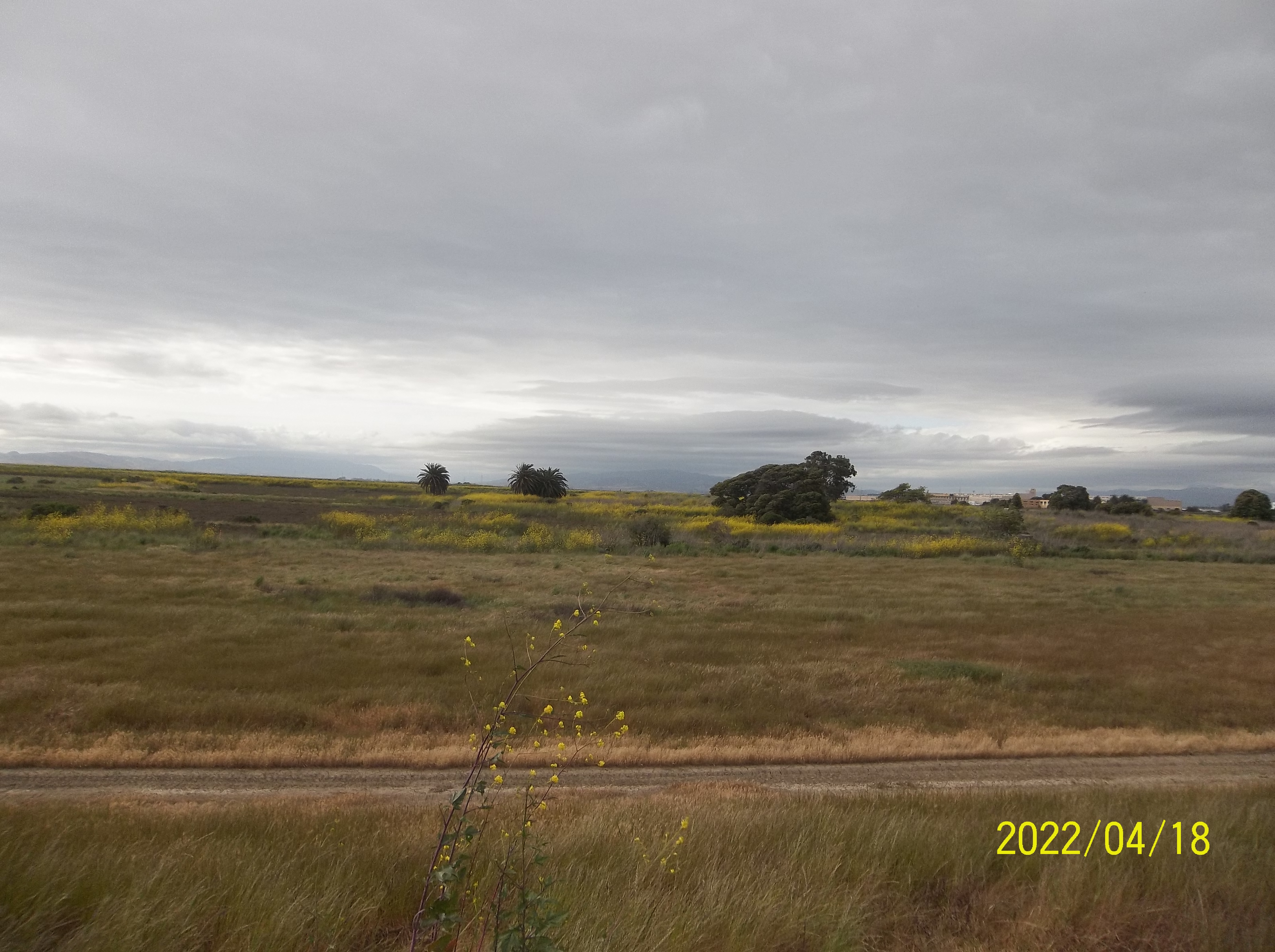
The trail on an overcast day

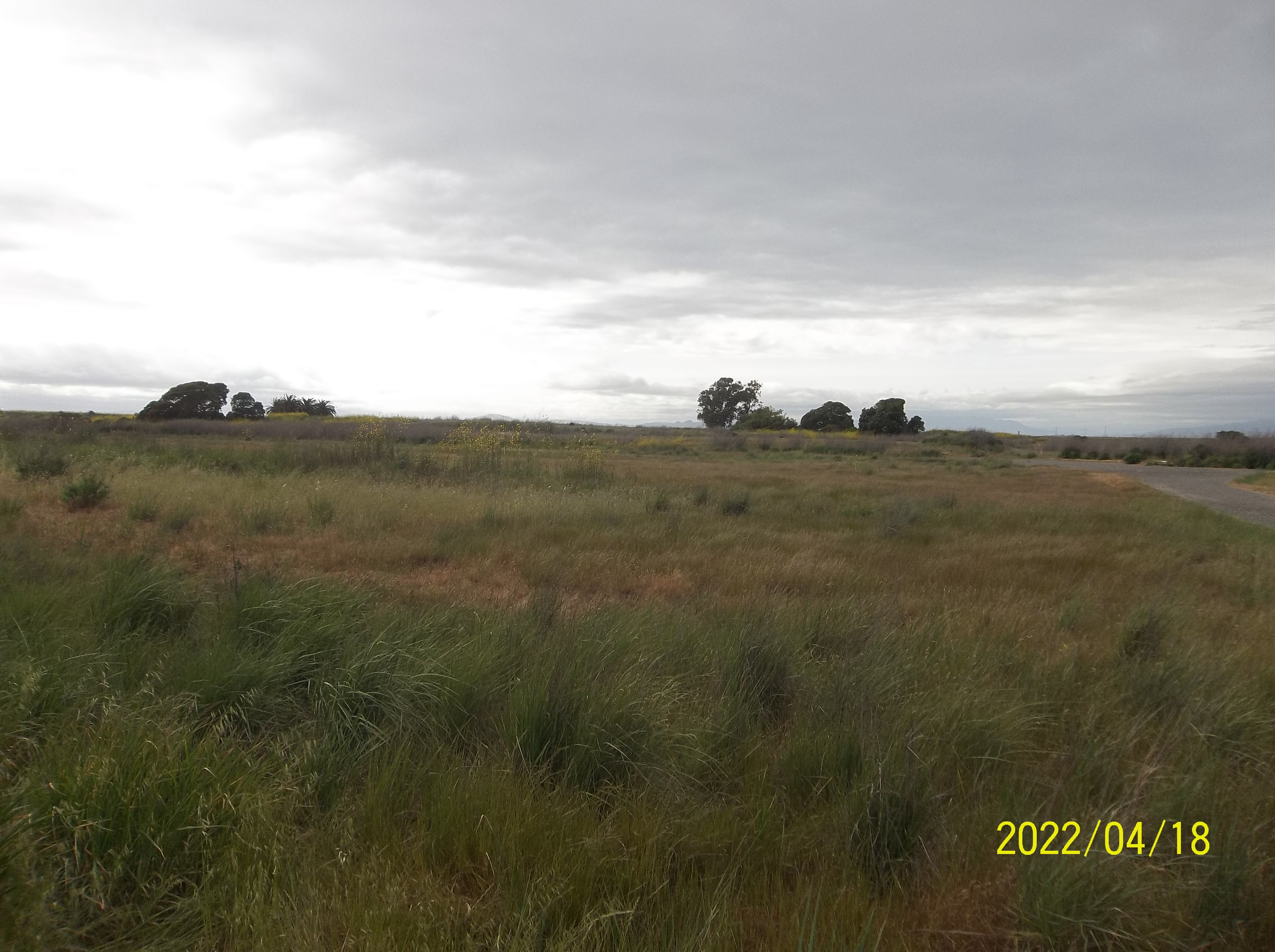

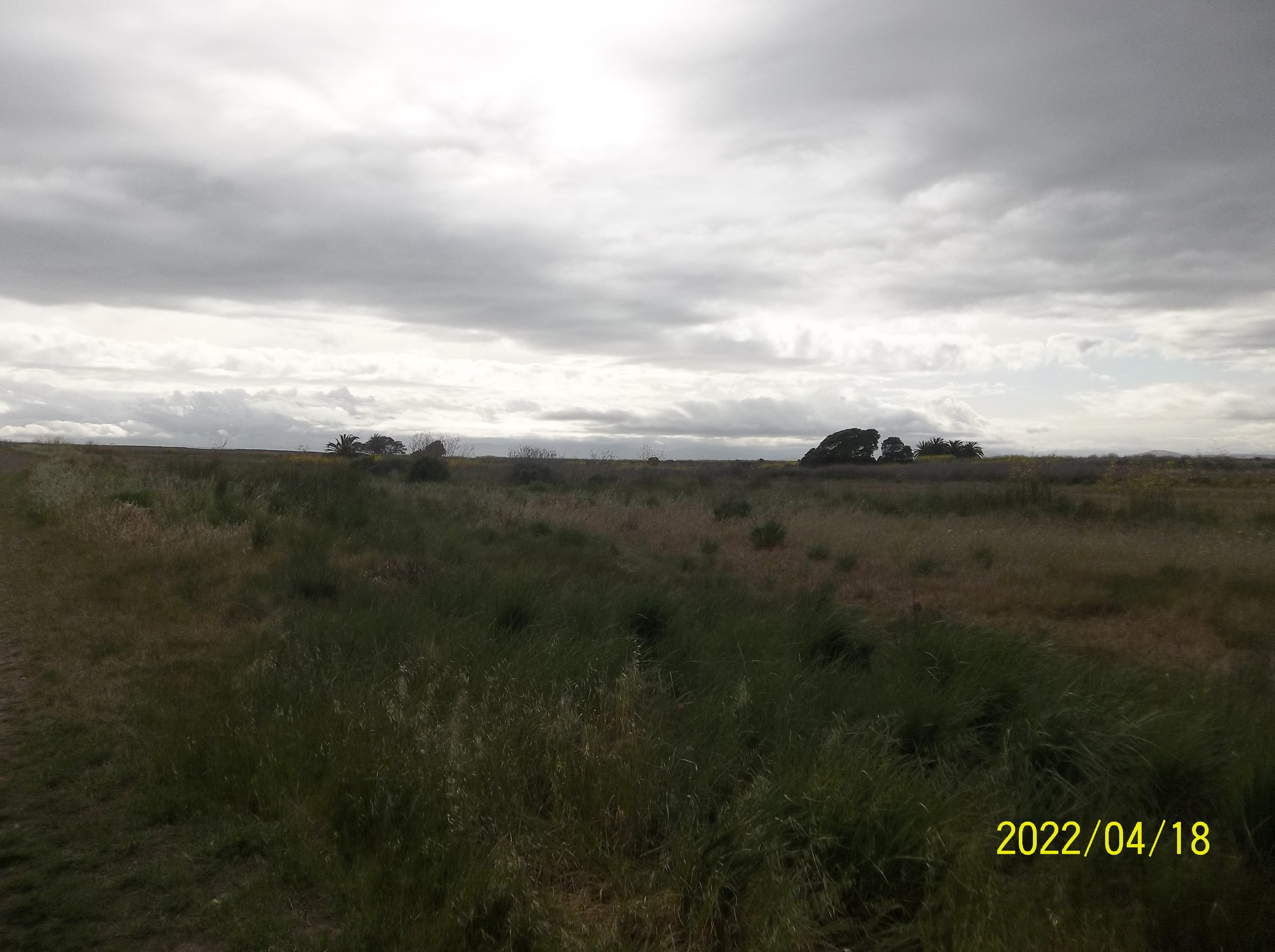

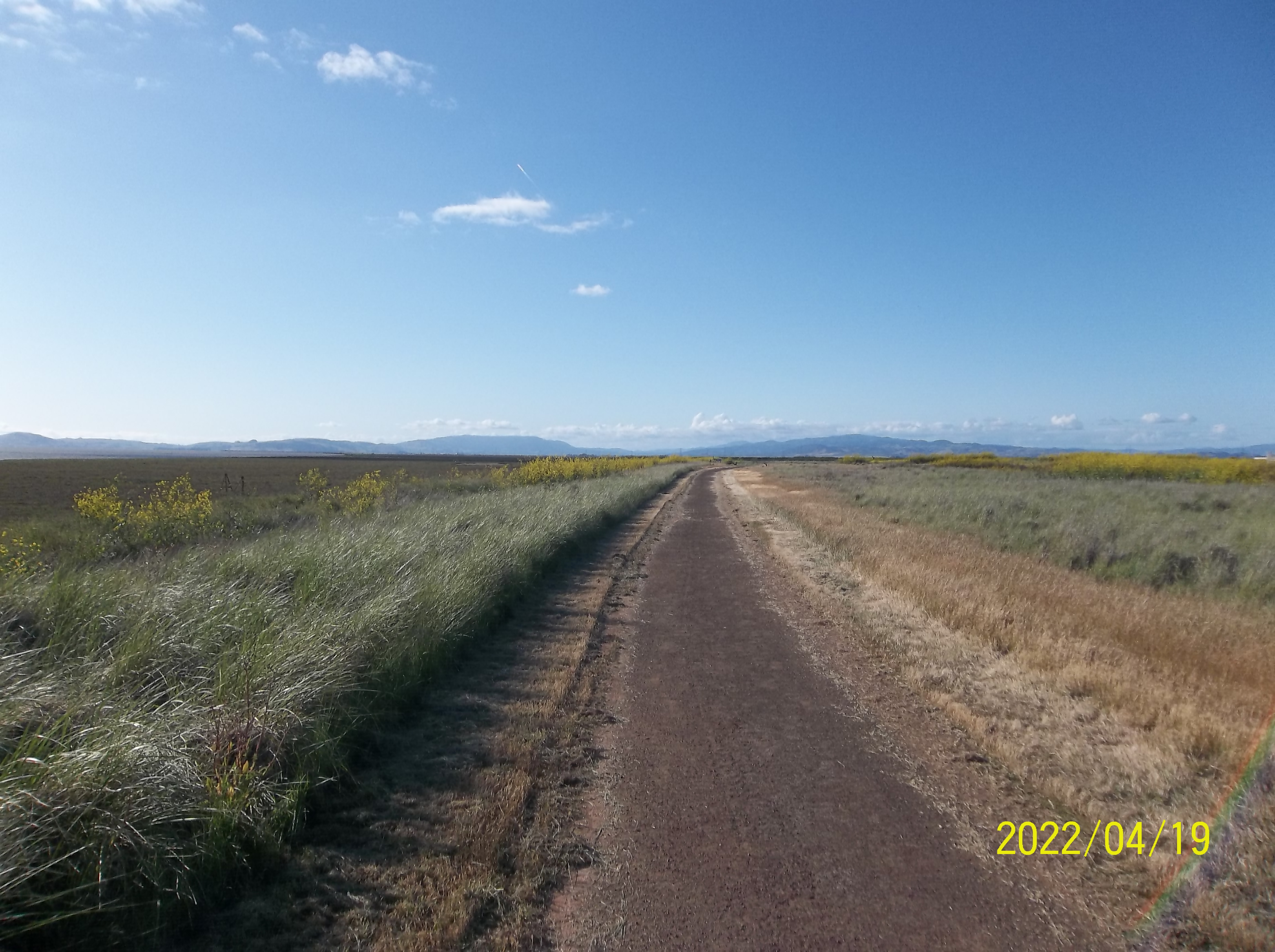
The trail on a sunny day

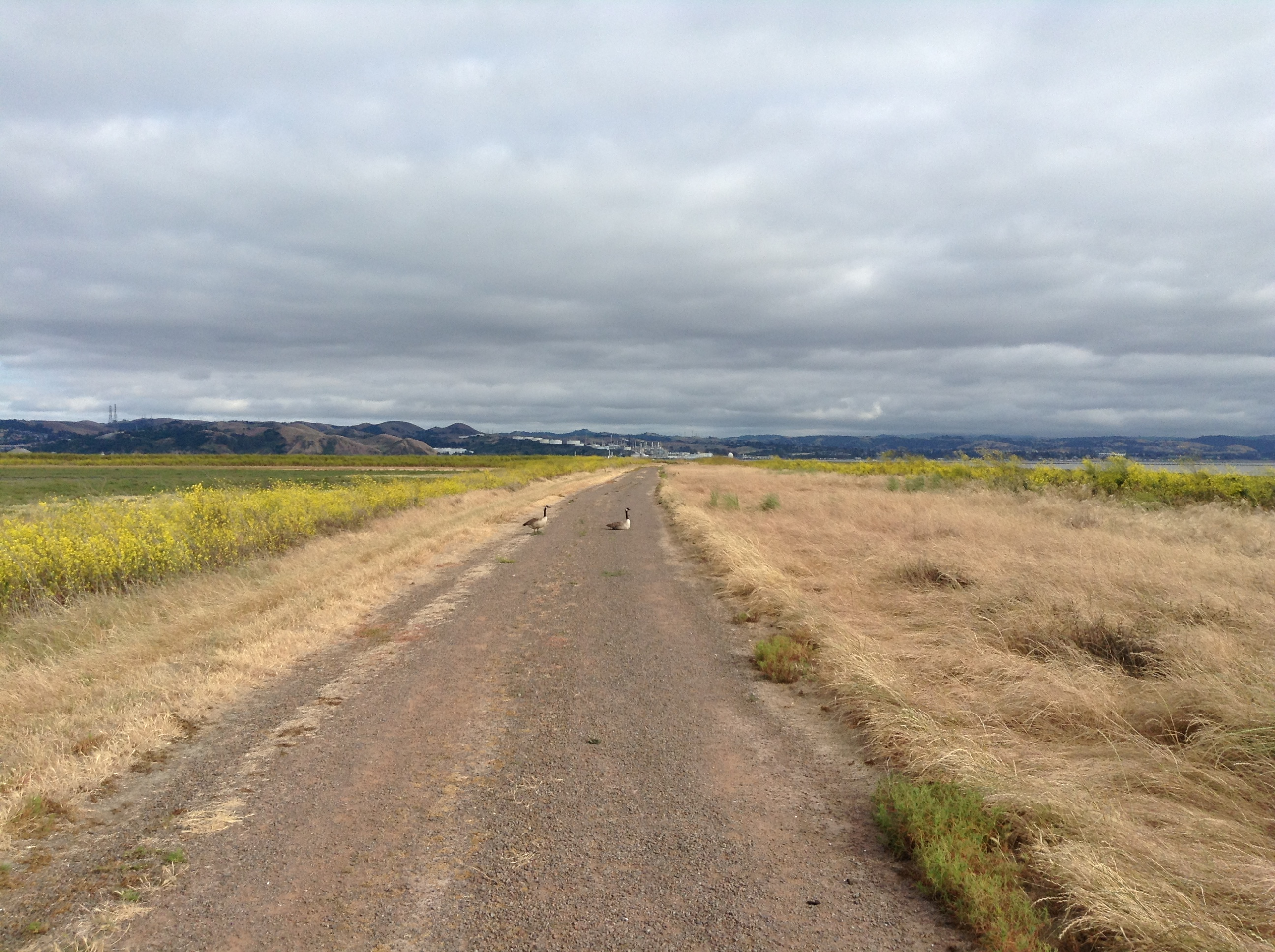
Canada geese on the San Pablo Bay Trail on Mare Island

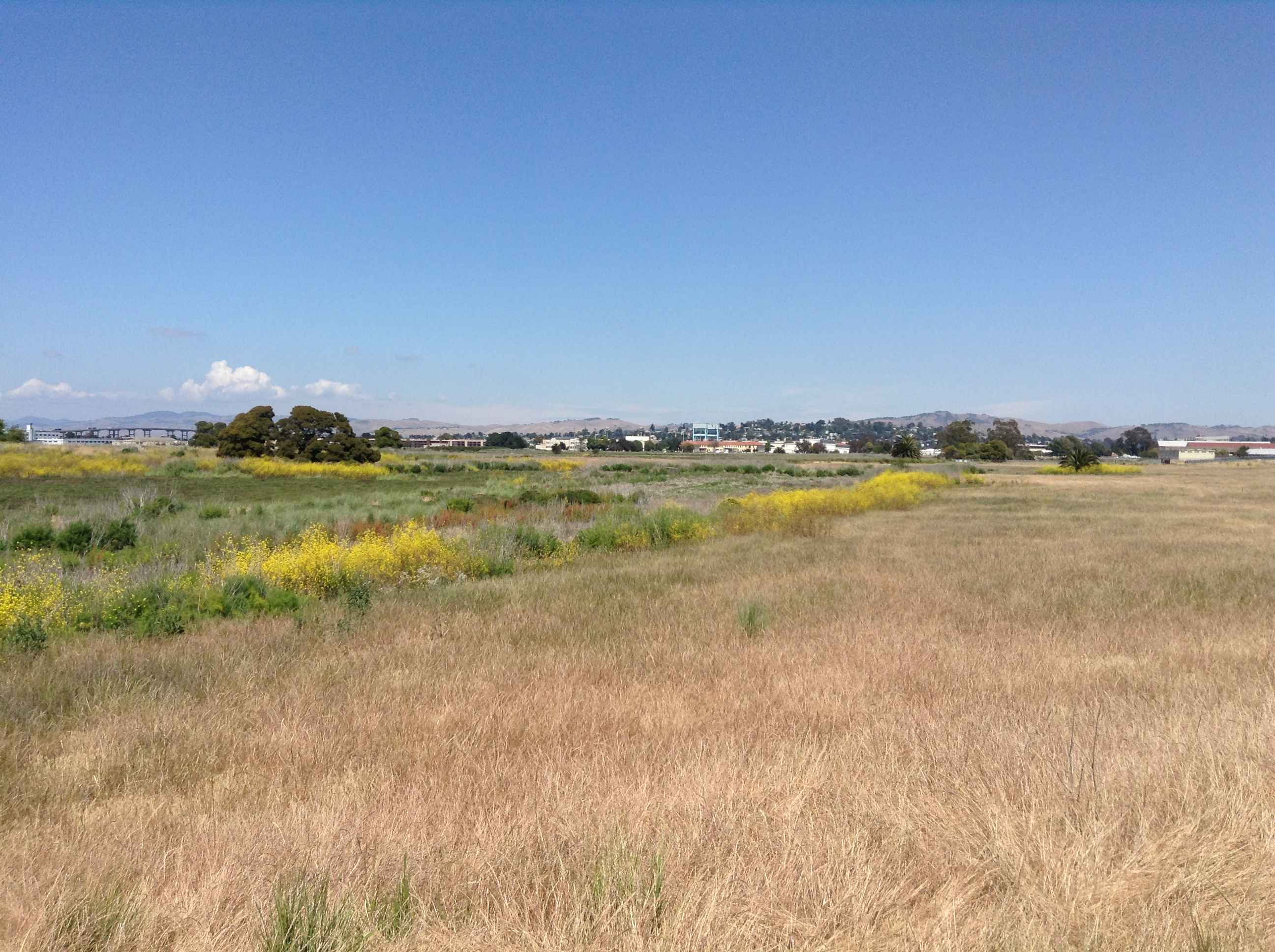
View of Vallejo from San Pablo Bay Trail on Mare Island

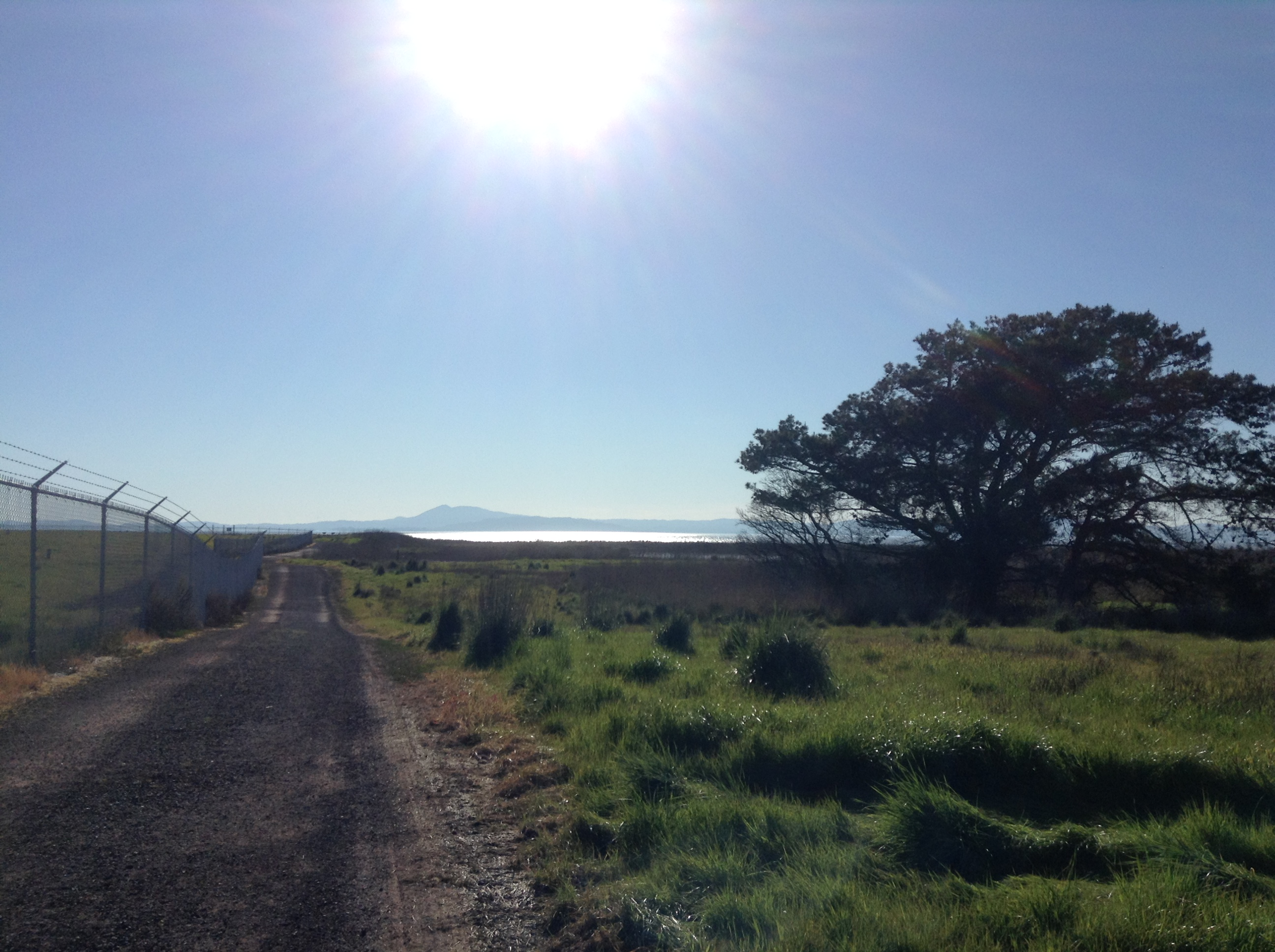
Looking at Mount Tam from San Pablo Bay trail on Mare Island
