= Reist Rocks =

Group of rocks on the Antarctic coast

Reist Rocks (66°31′S 107°25′E) is a small group of rocks on the Antarctic coast, 8 nautical miles (15 km) west of Snyder Rocks. First mapped from air photos taken by U.S. Navy Operation Highjump (1946–47). Named by Advisory Committee on Antarctic Names (US-ACAN) for Wilbur H. Reist, tractor driver with U.S. Navy Operation Windmill (1947–48), who assisted in transporting shore parties that established astronomical control stations from Wilhelm II Coast to Budd Coast.
