= Sean Dewart =

Canadian lawyer

Cecil Sean McWilliam Dewart is a lawyer in Toronto, Ontario, Canada. He is a partner in the Toronto law firm, Dewart Gleason LLP. He was counsel on a number of high-profile cases, including Jane Doe v. Metropolitan Toronto Commissioners of Police, Rogers v. Sudbury (Administrators of Ontario Works), and Payne v. Ontario (Ministry of Energy, Science and Technology), which stopped the Ontario government from privatizing Ontario Hydro. Later, he juniored for partner Tim Gleason in a number of cases, including General Motors of Canada v CAW et al. and Evans v. Toronto, in which the city was found partially liable for injuries to a cyclist resulting from poor urban planning.

He earned an LL.B. from Osgoode Hall Law School at York University in 1983, and a LL.M. from the London School of Economics in 1985.
