= Hatch Islands =

Islands in Wilkes Land, Antarctica

- Location within Antarctica

Geography
- Location: Antarctica
- Coordinates: 66°32′S 109°16′E

Administration
- Administered under the Antarctic Treaty System

Demographics
- Population: Uninhabited

The Hatch Islands are a small group of rocky islands lying 5.6 kilometres (3 nmi) east of Ivanoff Head at the head of Vincennes Bay of Wilkes Land, Antarctica. The islands mark the division between Knox Coast and Budd Coast. They were named after Ernest B. Hatch, a tractor driver on Operation Windmill.
