= Dewart Island =

Island in Antarctica

- Location within Antarctica

Geography
- Location: Vincennes Bay
- Coordinates: 66°13′S 110°10′E
- Archipelago: Frazier Islands

Administration
- Administered under the Antarctic Treaty System

Demographics
- Population: Uninhabited

Dewart Island is the central island in the Frazier Islands, in Vincennes Bay, Wilkes Land, East Antarctica.

== History ==
The island was photographed from the air in the course of the US Navy's Operation Highjump (1946–47) and its position fixed by the Australian National Antarctic Research Expeditions (1956). It was named by Carl R. Eklund for Gilbert Dewart, a seismologist at Wilkes Station, 1957.

== Antarctic Specially Protected Area ==
The island forms part of the Frazier Islands Antarctic Specially Protected Area (ASPA) No.160 because it supports one of only four known breeding colonies of southern giant petrels on continental Antarctica.

== See also ==
- List of Antarctic and subantarctic islands
