= Adams Glacier (Wilkes Land) =

Glacier in Wilkes Land, Antarctica

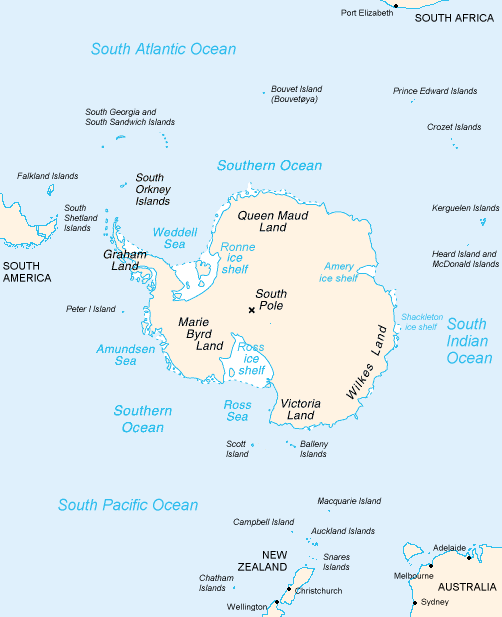
- Map of Antarctica, with Wilkes Land slightly to the right

- Location within Antarctica
- Location: Wilkes Land
- Coordinates: 66°50′S 109°40′E
- Length: 20 nmi (37 km; 23 mi)
- Terminus: Vincennes Bay

Adams Glacier (66°50′S 109°40′E), also known as John Quincy Adams Glacier, is a broad channel glacier in Wilkes Land, Antarctica which is over 20 miles (32 km) long. It debouches into the head of Vincennes Bay, just east of Hatch Islands. It was first mapped in 1955 by Gardner Dean Blodgett from aerial photographs taken by U.S. Navy Operation Highjump (1947), and it was named by the Advisory Committee on Antarctic Names (US-ACAN) for John Quincy Adams, sixth President of the United States. Adams was instrumental while later serving as U.S. representative from Massachusetts in gaining congressional authorization of the United States Exploring Expedition (1838–42) under Lieutenant Charles Wilkes, and perpetuating the compilation and publication of the large number of scientific reports based on the work of this expedition.

== See also ==
- List of glaciers in the Antarctic
- Glaciology
