= Simon F. Blunt =

- Born: Simon Fraser Blunt; August 1, 1818; Southampton County, Virginia, U.S.
- Died: April 27, 1854 (aged 35); Baltimore, Maryland, U.S.
- Occupation: Naval Captain
- Spouse: Ellen Lloyd Key

Simon Fraser Blunt (August 1, 1818 – April 27, 1854) was a member of the Wilkes Expedition, Cartographer of San Francisco Bay and was Captain of the SS Winfield Scott when it shipwrecked off Anacapa Island in 1853. Two geographic features, Blunt Cove and Point Blunt are named for him.

== Wilkes Expedition ==
Blunt joined the U.S. Navy, and in 1838, he was assigned to the USS Porpoise, under the command of Captain C. Ringgold. He passed the midshipman examination on June 23, before the ship joined the Wilkes Expedition in early August. In March 1839, while at Orange Bay, Blunt transferred to the USS Vincennes. On January 16, 1840, the expedition sailed close enough to Antarctica to see the actual continent; Blunt Cove is named after him. Blunt took sick in April, 1841 in Honolulu, possibly from participating in the trip to the summit of Mauna Loa Volcano. The Expedition reached Oregon on April 28, and explored the coast from there to San Francisco Bay. He was promoted to Lieutenant on July 28, 1842, a few weeks after the expedition had arrived back in New York.

== Intermediate years ==
In 1844–45, Blunt was assigned to the USS Truxtun in activities off the coast of Liberia.

On January 27, 1846, Blunt married Ellen Lloyd Key, daughter of Francis Scott Key, in Washington D.C. The couple had three children. In 1848, John Y. Mason named his son after Blunt.

== Charting San Francisco Bay ==
In 1849, Blunt was appointed to a Joint Commission of Army and Navy Officers (Joint Commission) whose purpose was to identify potential sites for lighthouses and defense facilities along the Pacific Coast of the California and Oregon territories. The Joint Commission consisted of three army engineers: Maj. John L. Smith, Maj Cornelius Austin Ogden and 1st Lt. Danville Leadbetter; and three naval officers: Comdr Louis M. Goldsborough, Comdr. G.J. Van Brunt, and Blunt. and had assembled in San Francisco by early April 1849. Blunt, either on his own or with the rest of the members of the Joint Commission presumably joined his former Captain on the Porpoise, now "Commodore" C. Ringgold on the chartered brig Col. Fremont to chart the San Francisco Bay region, suddenly important because of the discovery of gold in the area. Ringgold named Point Blunt on Angel Island for him. Afterwards, Blunt assisted Commodore Ringgold in the creation of two charts:

- Chart of the Farallones and entrance to the Bay of San Francisco, California (1850)
- Chart of the Bay of San Pablo, Straits of Carquinez, and part of the Bay of San Francisco (1850)

Blunt also drew a lithograph, View of Benicia from the anchorage east of Seal Island for Ringgold's Chart of Suisun & Vallejo bays with the confluence of the rivers Sacramento and San Joaquin, California A colored version of the lithograph was published in 1852.

The Joint Commission may have been joined by members of the land branch of the Pacific division of the United States Coast Survey (Pacific Coast Survey), James S. Williams and Richard P. Hammond who were unable to find boats to charter and James Blair. The USS Massachusetts was transferred to the Navy in San Francisco on August 1, 1849, and detailed for the use of the Joint Commission to take up and down the coast, however they could not recruit a crew. They borrowed some crewmen from another ship and Blunt may have made his second trip to Hawaii, where the Massachusetts wintered and hired native crewmen. Upon its return, the Joint Commission made preliminary recommendations to President Fillmore to reserve various islands and coastal regions in and around San Francisco Bay. then they and the Massachusetts sailed up to Puget Sound. After a cursory examination of the mouth of the Columbia River, the ship and the Joint Commission returned to California in July 1850. After a trip to San Diego, the Joint Commission made its final recommendation on November 30, 1850.

== Activities on the Pacific Coast ==
If Blunt went with the Joint Commission to Hawaii, immediately upon his return he separated from it and the Massachusetts. On March 10, 1850 Blunt was in command of the Schooner Arabian with another military survey party en route to Trinidad Bay. Upon reaching the bay, a boat with a landing party from the schooner swamped, resulting in the drowning of five men: Lieutenants Richard Bache and Robert L. Browning, John H. Peoples, W. W. Cheshire and John Purdy. Five more men survived. Blunt appears to have continued to the Columbia River and explored the Willamette Valley, and by August 1, 1850, to have attached to the Survey Schooner Ewing of the Pacific Coast Survey. In a letter of that date from William Pope McArthur (the first leader of the hydrographic branch of the Pacific Coast Survey) to his father-in-law Commander John J. Young, McArthur wrote: "Lt. Blunt who is now with me has traveled considerably through the country (the Willamette Valley) and is so much pleased with it, that he has taken a section of land and made a regular claim to it, he has also taken one for myself and one for Lt. Bartlett, both adjoining his!" (emphasis added). McArther was commander of Ewing, and Barlett one of its officers. (The Ewing had also wintered in Hawaii in 1849–50, giving opportunity for Blunt to become well acquainted with both men.) By August 31, 1850, Blunt was back in San Francisco, from which location he wrote to Mason

The Ewing worked its way south to San Diego then returned to San Francisco, and both McArthur and Barlett left for the east coast. At the end of December 1850, the Ewing was severely damaged in a storm while attempting to take the new land branch of the Pacific Coast Survey, George Davidson and James S. Lawson to Monterey Bay. Upon her repair, she traveled up the coast to the Columbia River. If Blunt was with the Ewing he was back by early to mid summer, when he was a signer of the constitution of the San Francisco Committee of Vigilance In August, he may have visited John Charles and Jessie Benton Frémont at their home in the same city.

On January 15, 1852, Secretary of the Navy Will A. Graham ordered a Naval Commission to select a site for a Naval Yard. Blunt, along with Commodore D. Sloat Commodore C. Ringgold, and William P.S. Sanger (former overseer of construction of Drydock Number One, Norfolk Naval Shipyard) were appointed to the commission. On July 13, 1852, Sloat recommended Mare Island to Graham.

== SS Winfield Scott ==
Blunt was hired as the Captain of the SS Winfield Scott, which carried passengers, mail and cargo between San Francisco and Panama. Having surveyed the Santa Barbara Channel a few years previously, on December 1, 1853, Blunt believed he knew it well enough to try to save time by steaming through it at full speed (Blunt may have been on the Ewing with his former crew member on the Wilkes Expedition, James Alden in the latter part of 1851, when Alden and the Ewing scouted the channel, as well as possibly having scouted it in the latter part of 1850 on either the Massachusetts or the Ewing.) even when warned about adverse conditions ahead. Upon encountering a heavy fog, Blunt slowed the ship down to 10 knots, but did not realize the current had taken the ship to the west, and the Winfield Scott ran aground off the shores of Anacapa Island. After seeing to the rescue of the passengers and salvage of the mail and cargo, he continued to "Atlantic States on a visit to his family and for the purpose of representing in person, the loss of the steamer of which he formerly had commanded."

== Death ==
Blunt died in Baltimore on April 27, 1854. His widow, Ellen Lloyd Key Blunt, was the subject of a March 7, 1856 letter by Jessie Benton Frémont to Elizabeth Blair Lee, lamenting Blunt's financial situation. Frémont attempted to intervene on Blunt's behalf by writing to George W. Blunt, son of Edmund March Blunt (no known relationship to Simon Blunt), (Note: The Wilkes Expedition also visited the Samoan Islands, where Blunts Point Battery is found. However, the point likely could have been named for George Blunt, or one of his brothers or his father (both named Edmund).) imploring him to buy a patent for a device developed by Simon Blunt to lower lifeboats into the water. But, towards the end of 1859, Frémont was exasperated with Blunt. Ellen Blunt relocated to Paris in 1861 to give dramatic readings; she died in 1884. Joseph Conrad used Simon and Ellen's names "Captain Blunt" and "Mrs. Blunt" in his book The Arrow of Gold.

Blunt's journal and a collection of his letters are archived in a collection in his name at the Virginia Historical Society. More letters can be found in the Mason Family Papers, 1825–1902 collection at the same institution.
