= Ivanoff Head =

Headland in Antarctica

Ivanoff Head (66°53′S 109°7′E) is a small rocky headland, or probable island, which lies along the coast and is partly overlain by continental ice, situated 4 miles (6.4 km) west of the Hatch Islands at the head of Vincennes Bay, Antarctica. The feature was first mapped from aerial photographs taken by U.S. Navy Operation Highjump, 1946–47, and was named "Brooks Island" by the Advisory Committee on Antarctic Names in 1956. The name Ivanoff Head, inadvertently applied by Australia in 1961, has succeeded the earlier name in general use and is now recommended. Helicopter landings were made here by Australian National Antarctic Research Expeditions from the Magga Dan in February 1960. The feature was used as a rescue base when a helicopter crashed nearby, and was named after Captain P. Ivanoff, the pilot of the crashed helicopter.

== See also ==
- Brooks Point
