= Vanderford Valley =

Valley in Antarctica

Vanderford Valley (Other English names: Vanderford Strath, Vanderford Submarine Valley Hungarian Vanderford-selfvölgy) (66°25′S 110°10′E) is an undersea valley, named in association with the Vanderford Glacier, which reaches a depth of 2287 m (7,503 ft). This may be the deepest glacier-carved valley in the world.
