= Blunt Cove =

Blunt Cove (66°54′S 108°48′E) is a cove in the southwest extremity of Vincennes Bay. First mapped (1955) by Gardner Dean Blodgett from aerial photographs taken by U.S. Navy Operation Highjump (1947), it was named by the Advisory Committee on Antarctic Names after Simon F. Blunt, Passed Midshipman on the sloop Vincennes during the United States Exploring Expedition (1838–42) under Lieutenant Charles Wilkes.
