= Vanderford Glacier =

Glacier in Antarctica

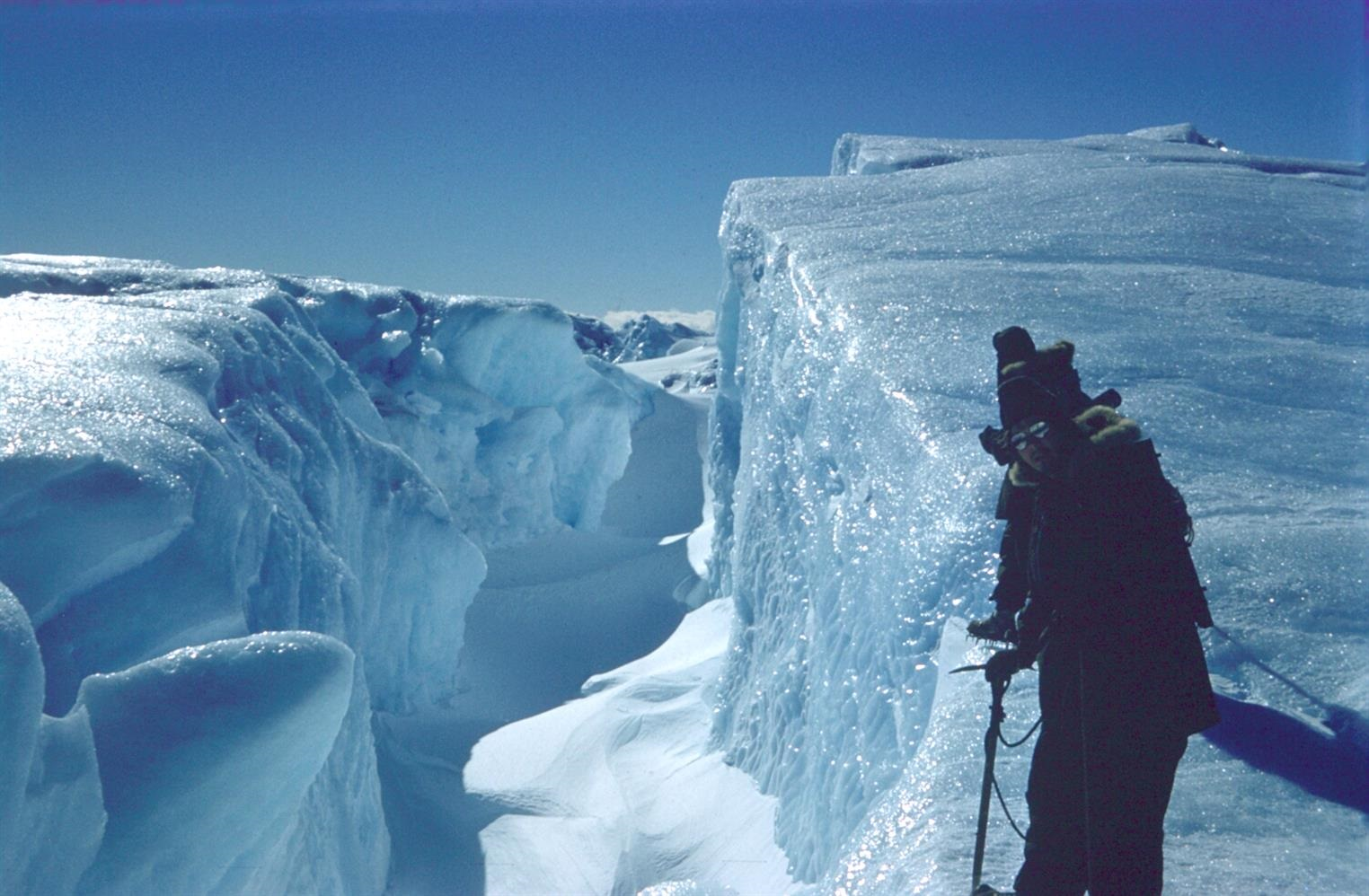
- Vanderford Glacier in 1957, person in photo unidentified

- Location within Antarctica
- Location: Wilkes Land
- Coordinates: 66°35′00″S 110°26′00″E
- Length: 4.3 nautical miles (8.0 km; 4.9 mi)
- Thickness: unknown
- Highest elevation: 55 metres
- Terminus: Vincennes Bay
- Status: unknown

Vanderford Glacier (66°35′S 110°26′E) is a glacier about 8 km (5 mi) wide flowing northwest into the southeast side of Vincennes Bay, slightly south of the Windmill Islands. It was named by the Advisory Committee on Antarctic Names (US-ACAN) for Benjamin Vanderford, pilot of the sloop of war Vincennes of the United States Exploring Expedition which was under Captain Wilkes from 1838 to 1842. The glacier was mapped from aerial photographs taken by U.S. Navy Operation Highjump, which was conducted from 1946 to 1947.

== See also ==
- List of glaciers in the Antarctic
- Glaciology
- Vanderford Valley
