= Cape Nutt =

Cape in Antarctica

Cape Nutt (66°38′S 108°12′E) is a mostly ice-covered cape with several rock outcrops at the extremity, forming the west side of the entrance to Vincennes Bay, Antarctica. The position of Cape Nutt correlates closely with the eastern end of "Knox's High Land" as charted as a coastal landfall in 1840 by the United States Exploring Expedition under Lieutenant Charles Wilkes. The cape was mapped from air photos taken by U.S. Navy Operation Highjump, 1946–1947. It was named by the Advisory Committee on Antarctic Names (US-ACAN) for Commander David C. Nutt, U.S. Navy Reserve, research assistant in geography at Dartmouth College, who served as a marine biologist on U.S. Navy Operation Windmill, 1947–1948.
