= Ontario Works =

- Coat of arms of Ontario

Agency overview
- Formed: 1997
- Type: Social assistance / employment support program
- Jurisdiction: Province of Ontario, Canada
- Headquarters: Toronto, Ontario
- Minister responsible: Michael Parsa, Minister of Children, Community and Social Services
- Parent agency: Ministry of Children, Community and Social Services
- Website: https://www.ontario.ca/page/ontario-works

Ontario Works (OW) is a social assistance program in Ontario, Canada, that provides financial and employment support to individuals and families in temporary financial need. The program offers financial support for rent and groceries, health benefits, and employment support. In Ontario, there are two support programs, Ontario Works and Ontario Disability Support Program.

== History ==
Ontario Works was established under the Ontario Works Act, 1997. Ontario Works is a social assistance program designed to support people in financial need by providing income assistance and employment services to help them achieve self-reliance. For single recipients, it offers $733 per month.

Kimberly Rogers was a woman in Sudbury, Ontario, who was convicted of welfare fraud in 2001 for receiving student loans while also collecting Ontario Works benefits. She was sentenced to house arrest and died under house arrest during a heatwave. Her death sparked public outcry and an inquest that criticized Ontario’s welfare rules and called for reforms.

Ontario Works caseload trends diverged from unemployment trends beginning in the 2000s, even as the labour market improved after 2008. Social assistance (both Ontario Works and Ontario Disability Support Program) rates remained elevated, indicating a decoupling of welfare dependency from employment conditions.

In 2023-24, there were 420,592 people on Ontario Works, which represented 46 percent of the 916,947 beneficiaries receiving social assistance in Ontario. The remaining beneficiaries were under the Ontario Disability Support Program.

== See also ==
- Ontario Social Benefits Tribunal
- Ontario Disability Support Program
