= Budd Coast =

Shoreline area in Antarctica

Location of Budd Coast (red) in Wilkes Land, Australian Antarctic Territory.

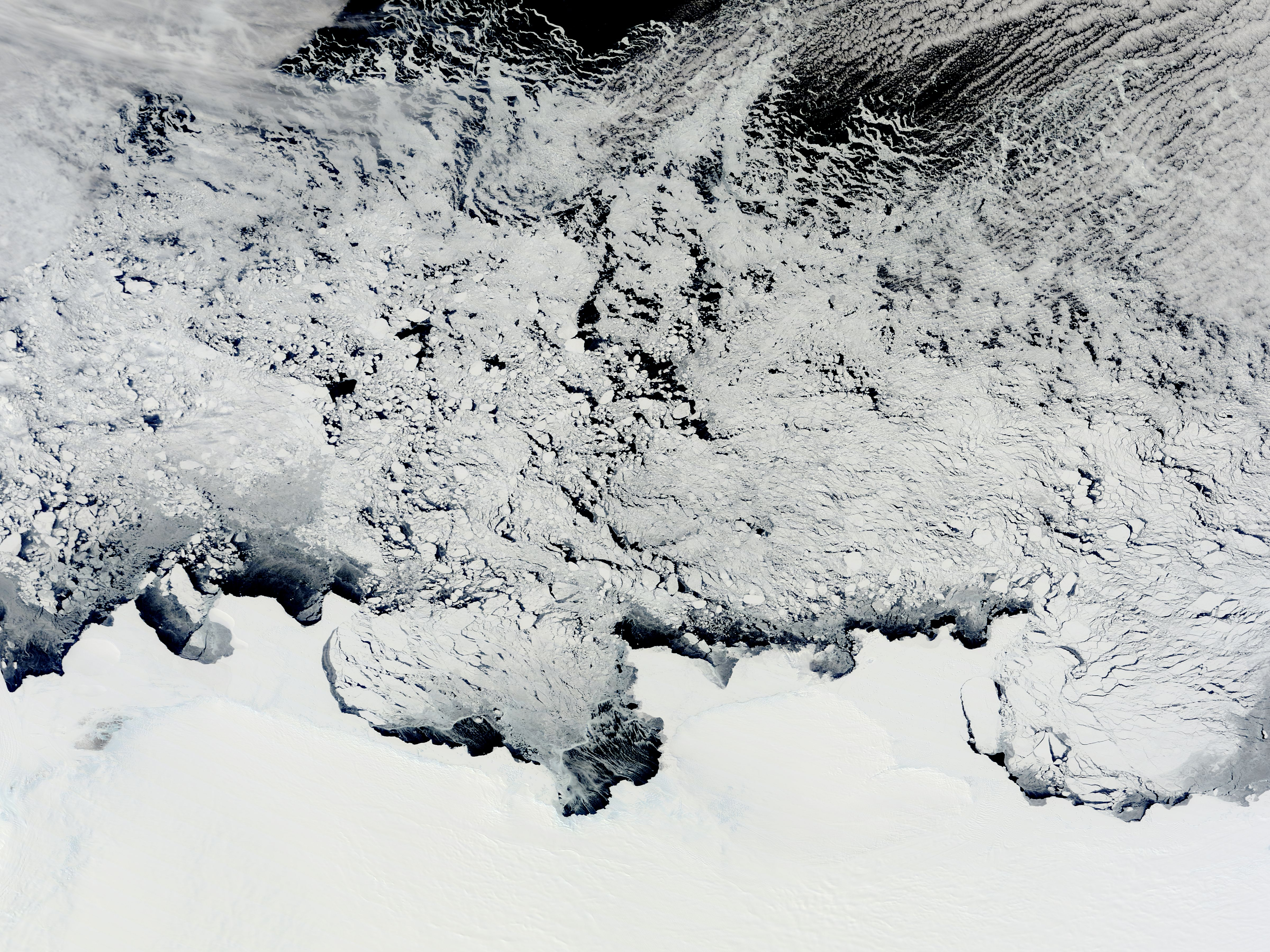
NASA MODIS satellite image of Knox, Budd and Sabrina coasts

Budd Coast (66°30′S 112°0′E), part of Wilkes Land, is that portion of the coast of Antarctica lying between the Hatch Islands, at 109°16'E, and Cape Waldron, at 115°33'E. It was discovered in February 1840 by the U.S. Exploring Expedition (1838–42) under the leadership of Lieutenant Charles Wilkes, and named by Wilkes for Thomas A. Budd, Acting Master of the sloop Peacock, one of the ships used on the expedition. A portion of the Puget Sound, Budd Inlet, is also named for Thomas Budd.
