= Vincennes Bay =

Bay in Wilkes Land, Antarctica

Coordinates: 66°30′S 109°30′E

Location of Vincennes Bay in Antarctica

Vincennes Bay is a large V-shaped bay, 105 km (65 mi) wide at its entrance between Cape Nutt and Cape Folger in Antarctica, marked by several large, steep glaciers near its head, lying along Knox and Budd Coasts. It was photographed from the air by US Navy Operation Highjump in 1946–47. The bay was entered in January 1948 by US Navy Operation Windmill icebreakers Burton Island and stations in the Windmill Islands in the NE portion of the bay. Named by the US-ACAN for the sloop of war USS Vincennes, flagship of the USEE under Wilkes, from which a series of coastal landfalls along Wilkes Land were discovered and plotted during January–February 1840. Wilkes' chart suggests a possible coastal recession corresponding closely with the longitudinal limits for Vincennes Bay, although pack ice conditions prevented close reconnaissance by the USEE of the coast in this immediate area.

Vincennes Bay is roughly triangular, 120 km north–south and 150 km east–west at its northern extremity, and thus covers an area of about 9,000 km^{2}. To the east lies the icecap of Law Dome and the north–south oriented Windmill Islands coast of Precambrian basement, which is the setting for Antarctic stations Wilkes (USA, 1957–59) and Casey (Australia, 1959–present day). The Knox Coast forms the western boundary of Vincennes Bay, where the East Antarctic ice sheet terminates in continuous ice cliffs. The southern coastline of Vincennes Bay is marked by the Vanderford and Adams Glaciers. The Vanderford Glacier drains the western hemisphere of Law Dome and together with the Adams Glacier, drains the main East Antarctic ice sheet via the Aurora subglacial basin, a major feature of East Antarctica. Petersen Bank (<200 m) is located on the eastern side of the bay and another shallow bank is located on the western side; however, much of Vincennes Bay lies deeper than 1000 m below sea level.

Glacial erosion has produced an over-deepened glacial trough on the inner shelf, up to 2,100 m in depth locally, and most of the inner shelf area is characterised by exposed basement rocks as seen on GI-gun seismic profiles. Glacial marine sedimentation processes in the bay are characterised by siliciclastic sediments dominating over biogenic sediments even in deep, inner shelf troughs. Water circulation in the Bay involves landward flow at depth, bringing warmer ocean water into contact with the base of the Vanderford Glacier. This water becomes mixed with fresh meltwater and suspended glacial sediments to form a buoyant plume that rises and flows in a seaward direction under the ice shelf.

Brooks Point is a rock headland on its western shore.
