= American exploration of Antarctica =

The United States has maintained a continuous presence in Antarctica, conducting scientific research without asserting any territorial claims. The U.S. first established its presence on the continent in 1928 when Richard Byrd led an expedition. Since then, the U.S. has engaged in scientific studies relating to climate, geology, and biology, with permanent research stations supporting year-round operations.

== History ==
=== United States Exploring Expedition (1838-1842) ===
The United States Exploring Expedition of 1838–1842 was a scientific and surveying expedition commissioned by the United States government to explore and chart the Pacific Ocean. The expedition explored Hampton Roads, Madeira, Rio de Janeiro, Tierra del Fuego, Valparaíso, Callao, Tahiti, Samoa, Sydney, Antarctica, Fiji, and the Hawaiian Islands.

The USS Flying Fish reached 70° latitude on 22 March 1839, in an area approximately 100 miles (160 kilometers) north of what is now Thurston Island, near Cape Flying Fish and the Walker Mountains. The squadron later reunited with the USS Peacock in Valparaíso on May 10; however, the USS Sea Gull was reported missing. On June 6, the squadron arrived at San Lorenzo, off Callao, for repairs and resupply, while Charles Wilkes dispatched the USS Relief back to the United States on June 21. Departing South America on July 12, the expedition reached Reao in the Tuamotu Archipelago on August 13 and arrived in Tahiti on September 11, before departing on October 10.

The expedition continued its journey, visiting Samoa and New South Wales. In December 1839, the squadron set sail from Sydney into the Southern Ocean. On 16 January 1840, Henry Eld and William Reynolds, aboard the Peacock, sighted Eld Peak and Reynolds Peak along the George V Coast, marking what they believed to be the Antarctic continent. Three days later, on January 19, Reynolds identified Cape Hudson. On January 25, the USS Vincennes observed mountains behind the Cook Ice Shelf and later documented similar peaks at Piner Bay on January 30.

By February 12, the expedition had charted 800 miles (1,300 kilometers) of Antarctic coastline, covering a region from 30' E. to 112° 16' 12"E. Wilkes formally declared that they had "discovered the Antarctic Continent." The area, later named Wilkes Land, includes Claire Land, Banzare Land, Sabrina Land, Budd Land, and Knox Land. In total, the expedition mapped approximately 1,500 miles (2,400 kilometers) of Antarctic coastline, reaching as far west as 105° E, near the edge of Queen Mary Land, before turning northward on February 21.

=== Richard Byrd's expeditions (1928–1930, 1933-1934) ===
==== First Antarctic expedition (1928–1930) ====
In 1928, Richard Byrd launched his first Antarctic expedition, utilizing two ships and three airplanes. His flagship, City of New York, was a former Norwegian sealing ship previously known as Samson, which some claimed was near the Titanic during its sinking. The second vessel, Eleanor Bolling, was named after Byrd's mother. The expedition's aircraft included a Ford Trimotor, Floyd Bennett, piloted by Dean Smith and named after Byrd's late colleague; a Fairchild FC-2W2, Stars and Stripes, now displayed at the National Air and Space Museum's Udvar-Hazy Center; and a Fokker Super Universal monoplane, Virginia, named after Byrd's home state. The team established "Little America", a base camp on the Ross Ice Shelf, and conducted scientific surveys using snowshoes, dog sleds, snowmobiles, and airplanes. To inspire youth engagement in polar exploration, Byrd selected 19-year-old Boy Scout Paul Allman Siple for the expedition. Siple later earned a doctorate and became the only person, aside from Byrd himself, to participate in all five of Byrd's Antarctic missions.

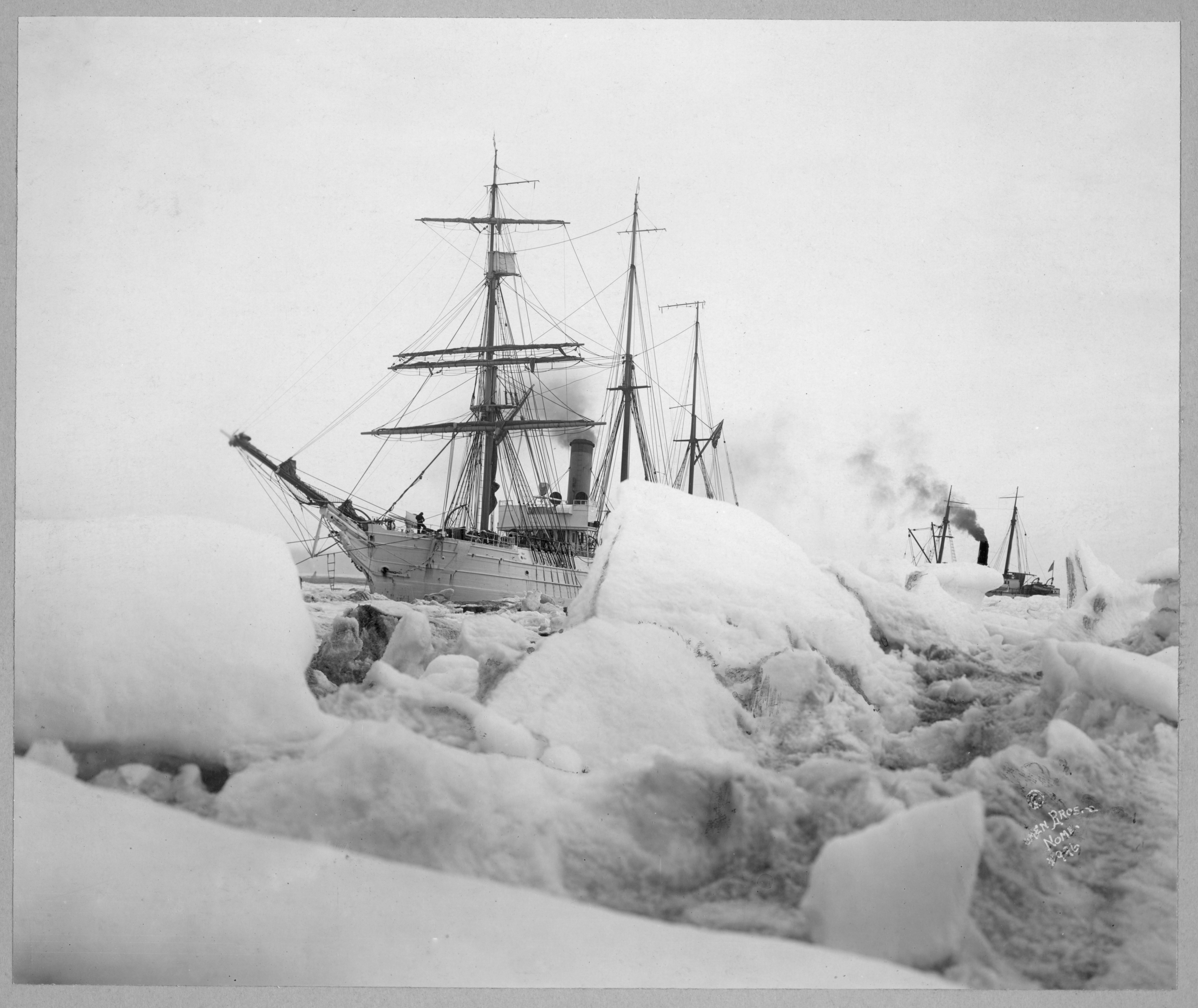
Byrd's expedition ship

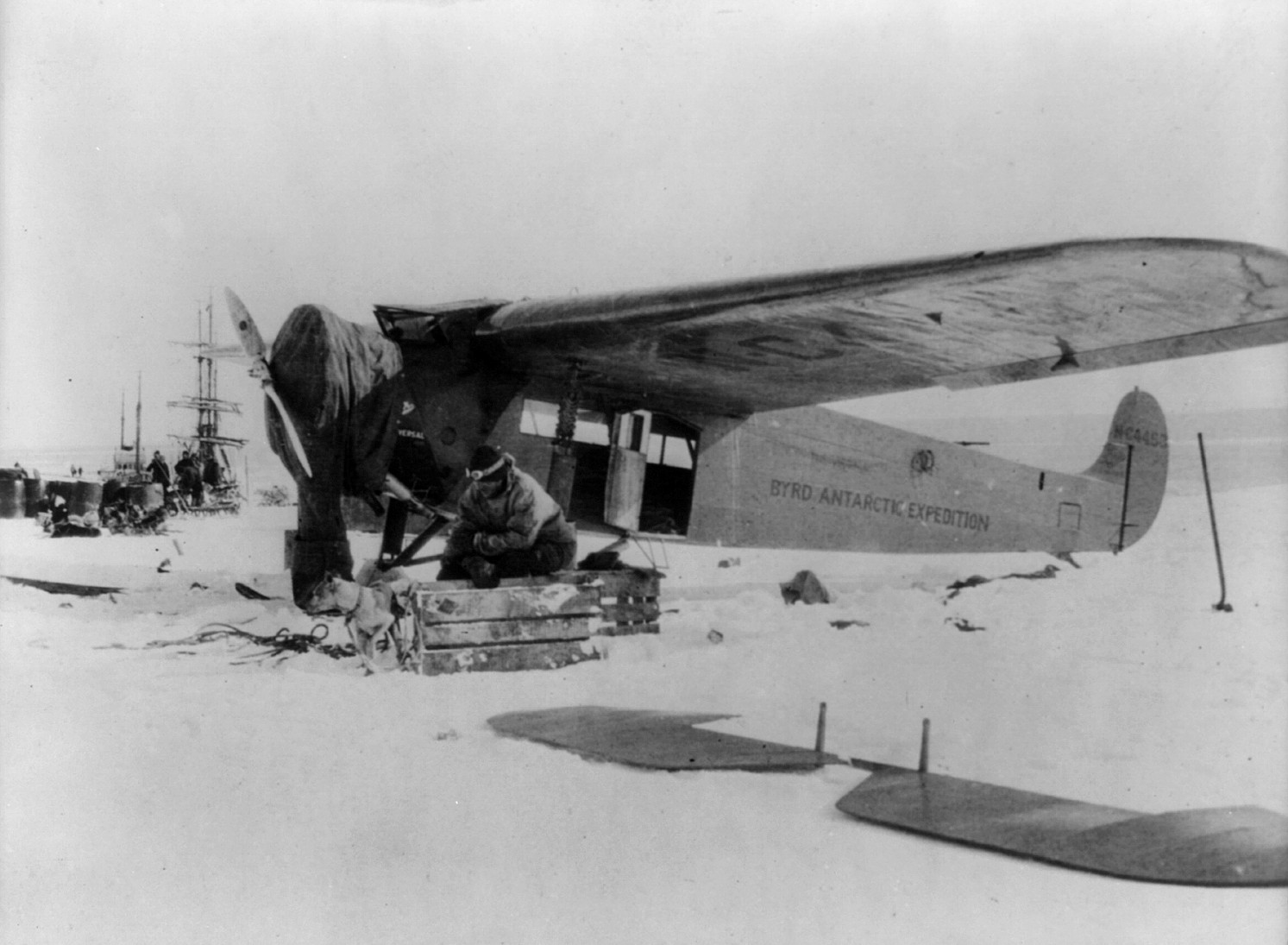
Fokker Super Universal of the Bryd Antarctic expedition of 1929

Throughout the summer, the expedition conducted photographic surveys and geological studies while maintaining constant radio communication with the outside world. After their first winter, their expeditions were resumed, and on 28 November 1929, the first flight to the South Pole and back was launched. Byrd, accompanied by pilot Bernt Balchen, co-pilot and radioman Harold June, and photographer Ashley McKinley, flew the Floyd Bennett on an 18-hour and 41-minute round-trip journey. The crew faced challenges in gaining sufficient altitude and were forced to jettison empty fuel tanks and emergency supplies to clear the Polar Plateau, but they ultimately succeeded in reaching the South Pole.

In November 1929, Byrd led a privately financed expedition and became the first to successfully fly over the South Pole. He was a strong proponent of using ski-equipped aircraft, despite the significant operational, logistical, and maintenance challenges they presented, which required the establishment of substantial onshore bases to support their use.

As a result of his achievement, Byrd was promoted to rear admiral by a special act of Congress on December 21, 1929. At 41 years old, he became the youngest person to hold this rank in U.S. Navy history. Byrd was one of only four individuals, including Admiral David Dixon Porter, Arctic explorer Rear Admiral Donald Baxter MacMillan, and Rear Admiral Frederic R. Harris, to be promoted directly to rear admiral without first serving as a captain.

After another summer of exploration, the expedition returned to North America on 18 June 1930. Unlike the 1926 flight, this expedition was awarded the gold medal of the American Geographical Society. Byrd's journey was also documented in the 1930 film With Byrd at the South Pole.

Byrd, now an internationally recognized polar explorer and aviator, served as Honorary National President of Pi Gamma Mu, the international honor society in the social sciences, from 1931 to 1935. To symbolize the pursuit of knowledge and discovery, he carried the society's flag during his first Antarctic expedition.

To secure funding and build political and public support for his expeditions, Byrd maintained close relationships with influential figures, including President Franklin Roosevelt, Henry Ford, Edsel Ford, John D. Rockefeller Jr., and Vincent Astor. In recognition of their support, he named various geographic features in Antarctica after them.

==== Second Antarctic expedition (1933-1934) ====
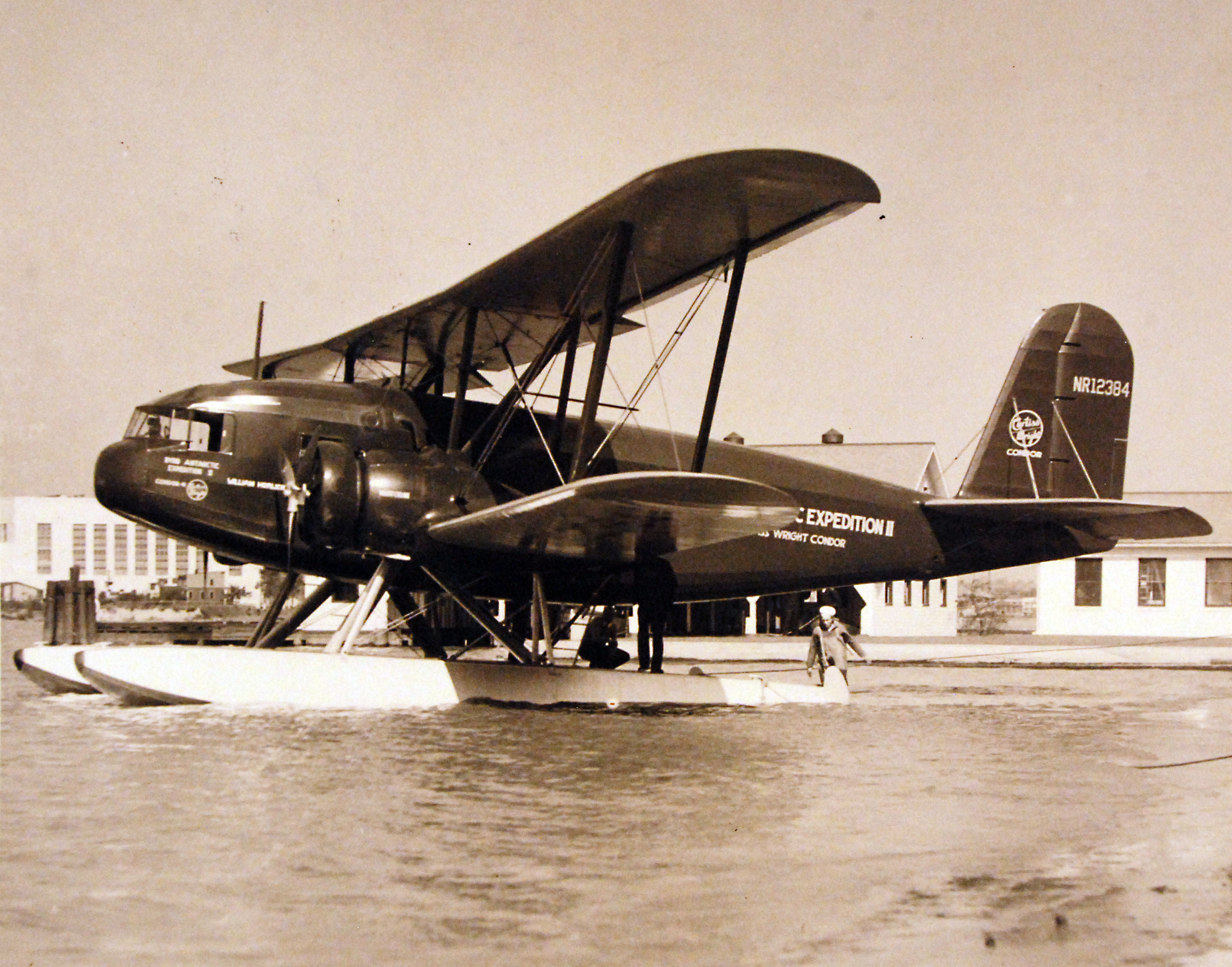
Byrd's Curtiss T-32 Condor II of second Antarctic expedition, November 1933

During his second expedition in the Antarctic summer of 1933–1934 (winter in the Northern Hemisphere), Byrd spent five months alone at Advance Base, a remote meteorological station. He nearly perished from carbon monoxide poisoning due to a poorly ventilated stove. After detecting unusual radio transmissions from Byrd, his team at base camp attempted multiple rescue missions, initially hindered by darkness, heavy snow, and mechanical failures. Eventually, Thomas Poulter, E. J. Demas, and Amory Waite reached Advance Base and found Byrd in poor health. They remained with him until October 12, when an aircraft evacuated Byrd and Poulter, while the others returned to base camp using a tractor. Byrd later recounted the ordeal in his autobiography Alone.

During the Antarctic summer, daylight was prolonged, with evenings in twilight. Inside the expedition headquarters, Byrd marked the passage of time on a large wall calendar. A CBS radio station, KFZ, was established aboard the expedition's base camp ship, Bear of Oakland, broadcasting The Adventures of Admiral Byrd via shortwave to Buenos Aires and then relayed to New York. Sponsored by General Foods, the broadcasts aired on Saturday nights at 10:00 pm and reached #16 on the Hooper rating for the 1933-34 broadcast season, reaching an average audience of 19.1 million.

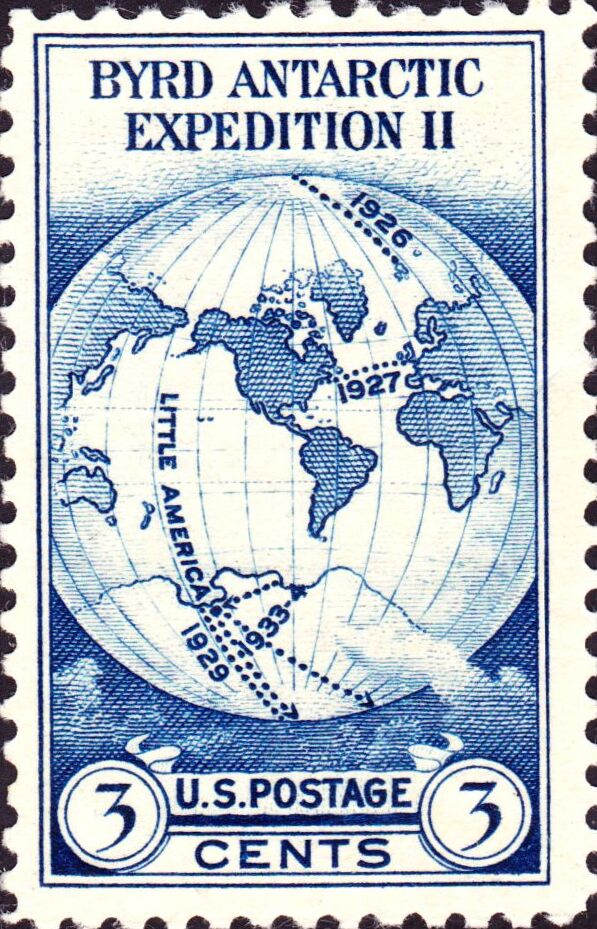
Admiral Byrd's Antarctic Expedition stamp of 1933

Byrd's expedition inspired a 1933 U.S. commemorative stamp issued by the Post Office, which helped raise funds for the mission. The Post Office collaborated with the expedition to sell philatelic covers, which were serviced at a temporary U.S. postal station established at Little America on October 6, 1933. Each piece of mail required at least one Byrd II 3-cent stamp, along with 53 cents in postage. Approximately 150,000 pieces of mail passed through the Antarctic post office between 1933 and 1934. Charles F. Anderson, a representative of the Postmaster General, was assigned to oversee the postal operations at Little America.

In late 1938, Byrd visited Hamburg and was invited to join the 1938–1939 German "Neuschwabenland" Antarctic Expedition but declined. At the time, Germany was not at war with the United States, though Adolf Hitler had been serving as Führer since 1934 and would invade Poland the following year.

=== United States Antarctic Service Expedition (1939–1941) ===
The United States Antarctic Service Expedition was a government-sponsored research expedition to Antarctica, jointly supported by the United States Navy, the Department of the State, the Department of the Interior, and the Department of the Treasury. While primarily funded by the U.S. government, the expedition also received additional support through donations and contributions from private citizens, corporations, and institutions.

Richard Byrd contributed numerous supplies to the expedition, including the Bear of Oakland, which was commissioned as USS Bear (AG-29) on 11 September 1939. A second vessel, the USMS North Star, a 1,434-ton wooden ice ship built for the Bureau of Indian Affairs, was provided by the Department of the Interior.

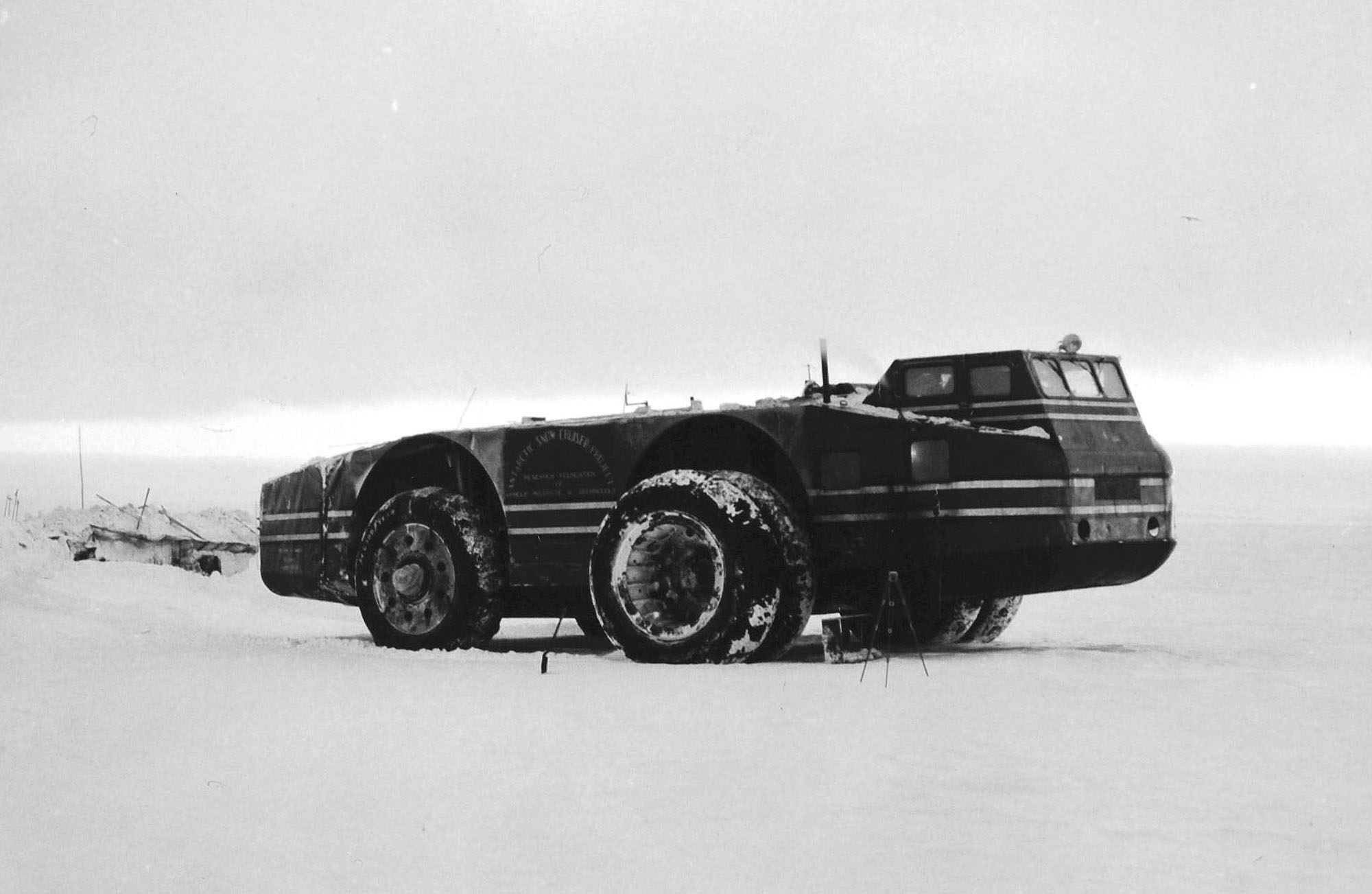
The Antarctic Snow Cruiser, 1940

The expedition, consisting of 125 men, departed from the United States aboard two ships. Participants were primarily drawn from military ranks, civilian government agencies, and scientific institutions, with some volunteers employed by the Department of the Interior for $10 per month, which included food and clothing. Of the expedition members, 59 men, initially divided into three groups, wintered in Antarctica.

The objectives of the expedition were outlined in an order from President Franklin D. Roosevelt dated 25 November 1939. The plan called for establishing two bases: East Base, near Charcot Island, Alexander I Land, or Marguerite Bay if necessary, and West Base, near King Edward VII Land or, if infeasible, at the Bay of Whales near Little America. Additionally, the expedition aimed to map the continental coastline between the 72°W and 148°W meridians. Despite the challenges of Antarctic exploration, most of the expedition's objectives were successfully achieved.

The team also brought an M2A2 Light Tank and a T3E4 Carrier for testing in polar conditions. While both vehicles performed well, their weight made them impractical for the terrain, leading to their abandonment. The expedition also deployed the Antarctic Snow Cruiser, an ambitious but unsuccessful vehicle designed for polar exploration. Featuring several innovative elements, it struggled to function effectively in the harsh Antarctic conditions and was eventually abandoned. Rediscovered in 1958, it is now believed to have been lost when the ice floe it rested on broke off and melted.

Among the expedition's crew was George Washington Gibbs Jr., the first African American to set foot on Antarctica. Serving as a Mess Attendant 1st Class aboard USS Bear, he also worked as a cook and assisted with various expedition tasks.

Due to rising international tensions, it was deemed prudent to evacuate the two bases rather than relieve the current personnel with new teams. The hope was that the bases might one day be reoccupied, so an abundance of equipment and supplies was left behind as the two ships departed from West Base on 1 February 1941. The evacuation of East Base was completed by March 22, and both ships left immediately afterward. The USMS North Star arrived in Boston on May 5, followed by the USS Bear on May 18.

On 24 September 1945, Congress passed Public Law 79-185 (59 Stat. 536), authorizing the presentation of gold, silver, and bronze medals to members of the United States Antarctic Expedition. The medals were awarded at the discretion of the Secretary of the Navy to honor the participants' valuable contributions to polar exploration and science.

=== Operation Highjump (1946–1947) ===
Operation HIGHJUMP was a United States Navy mission aimed at establishing the Antarctic research base Little America IV. Organized by Rear Admiral Richard E. Byrd Jr., USN, as Officer in Charge, and led by Rear Admiral Ethan Erik Larson, USN, as Commanding Officer of Task Force 68, the operation began on 26 August 1946, and concluded in late February 1947. It comprised approximately 4,700 personnel, 70 ships, and 33 aircraft.

The Western Group of ships arrived at the Marquesas Islands on 12 December 1946, where the USS Henderson and USS Cacapon established weather monitoring stations. By December 24, the USS Currituck had begun launching reconnaissance flights. Meanwhile, the Eastern Group reached Peter I Island in late December.

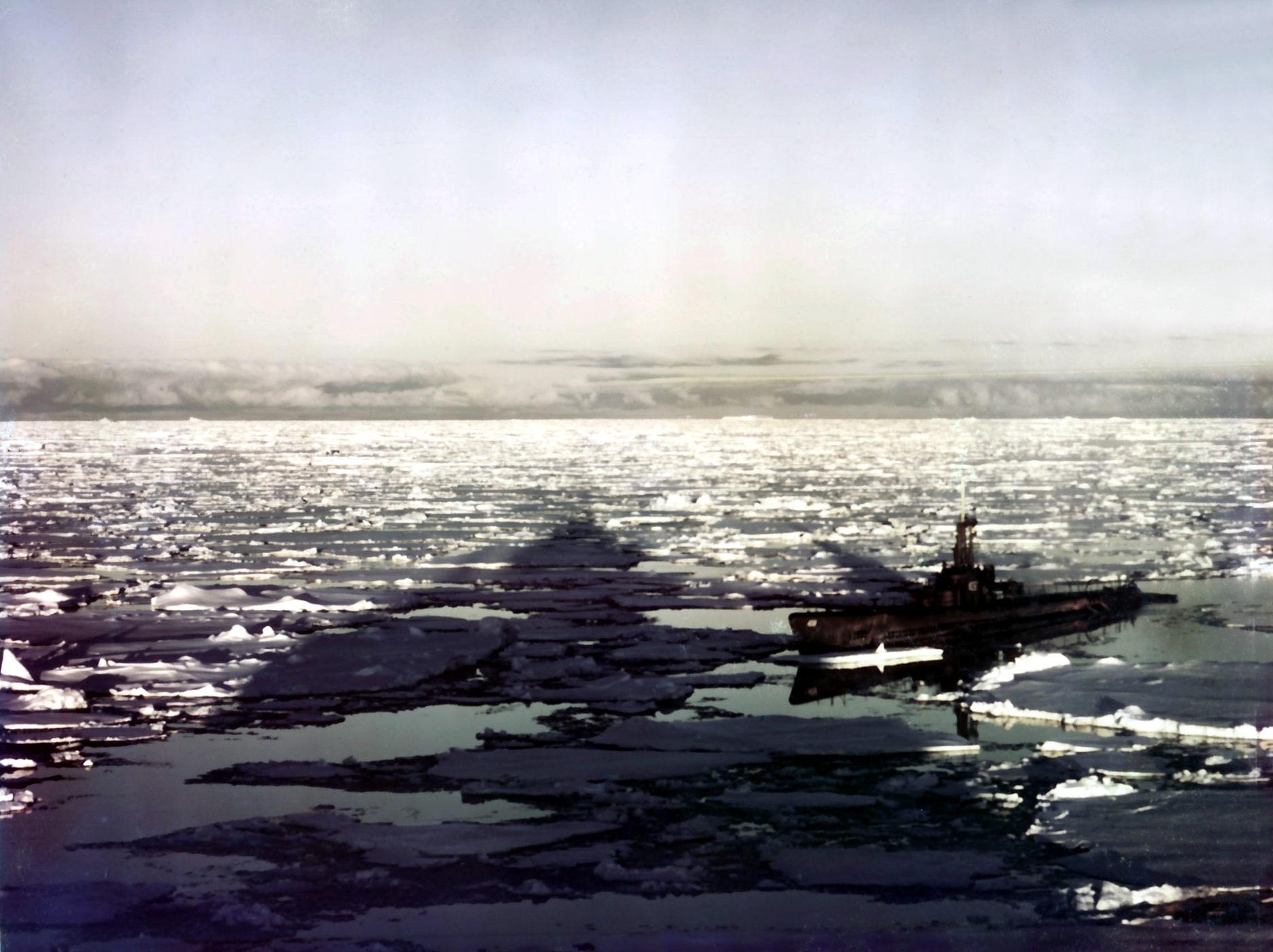
USS Sennet, a Balao-class submarine, participating in Operation Highjump

On 30 December 1946, the Martin PBM-5 George 1 crashed on Thurston Island, resulting in the deaths of Ensign Maxwell A. Lopez, ARM1 Wendell K. Henderson, and ARM1 Frederick W. Williams. The six surviving crew members were rescued 13 days later. Vance N. Woodall, who died on 21 January 1947, was the only other fatality of Operation HIGHJUMP.

On 1 January 1947, Lieutenant Commander Thompson and Chief Petty Officer John Marion Dickison conducted the first recorded American dive under Antarctic waters using "Jack Browne" masks and DESCO oxygen rebreathers. Paul Siple, the senior U.S. War Department representative on the expedition, had previously accompanied Byrd on his earlier Antarctic expeditions as an Eagle Scout.

The Central Group of ships arrived at the Bay of Whales on 15 January 1947, and commenced construction of Little America IV. Naval ships and personnel were withdrawn to the United States in late February 1947 as the expedition was terminated due to the early onset of winter and worsening weather conditions.

=== Operation Windmill (1947–1948) ===
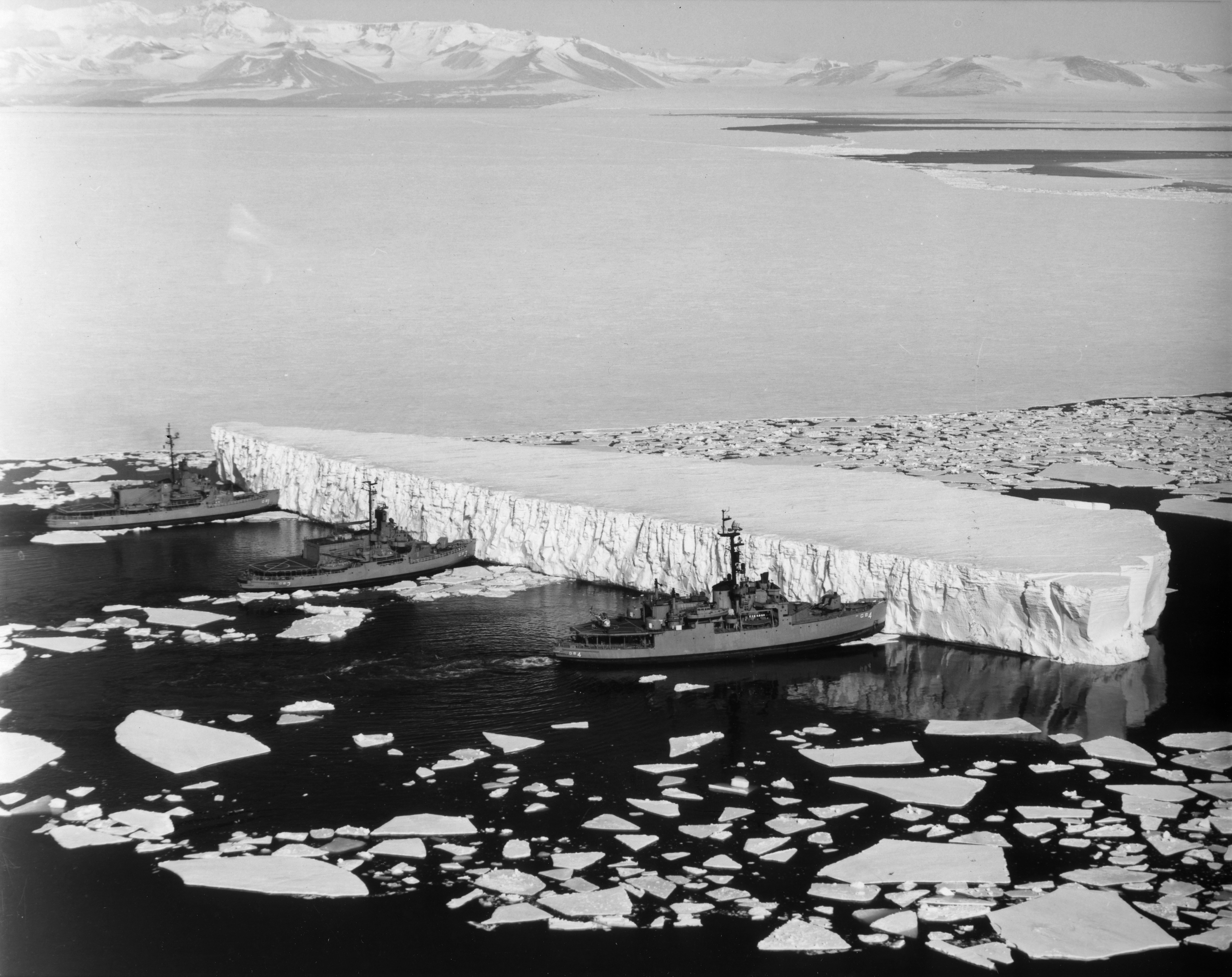
Burton Island, Atka (AGB-3), and Glacier (AGB-4) worked together to push an iceberg out of the channel in the "Silent Land" near McMurdo Station, Antarctica, 29 December 1965

Operation Windmill was the United States Navy's second Antarctica Developments Project, an exploration and training mission conducted in 1947 to 1948. It followed Operation Highjump. The expedition was led by Commander Gerald L. Ketchum, USN, with the icebreaker USS Burton Island serving as the flagship of Task Force 39.

Missions during Operation Windmill included a range of activities such as supply operations, helicopter reconnaissance of ice flows, scientific surveys, underwater demolition assessments, and convoy exercises. Additionally, Malcolm Davis collected live animals, including penguins and leopard seals, for zoological studies.

The icebreaker USS Edisto (AG-89) departed on 1 November 1947, sailing toward the Panama Canal to rendezvous with the Burton Island for the expedition.

=== Ronne Antarctic Research Expedition (1947–1948) ===
The Ronne Antarctic Research Expedition was a privately funded scientific expedition that took place from 1947 to 1948, focusing on exploring and mapping the region around the head of the Weddell Sea.

Finn Ronne led the expedition, which explored and mapped previously uncharted coastlines, confirming that the Weddell Sea and the Ross Sea were not connected. The team included Isaac Schlossbach as second-in-command, after whom Cape Schlossbach was later named. Based at Stonington Island, the expedition was also notable for being the first to include women in an Antarctic overwintering party. Edith Ronne, Finn Ronne's wife, served as a correspondent for the North American Newspaper Alliance, while chief pilot Darlington was accompanied by his wife.

=== Operation Deep Freeze ===
Operation Deep Freeze is the codename for a series of United States missions to Antarctica, starting with "Operation Deep Freeze I" in 1955 to 1956, followed by successive missions numbered sequentially. Prior to these missions, an initial operation took place before Admiral Richard Byrd formally proposed "Deep Freeze." Due to the continuous U.S. presence in Antarctica since that time, "Operation Deep Freeze" has become a general term for U.S. operations on the continent, particularly the regular missions coordinated by the United States military to resupply American Antarctic bases. Task Force 199 played a role in these efforts.

For several decades, the mission was primarily led by the United States Navy, but the Air National Guard and the National Science Foundation have also played significant roles. The operation typically takes place during the Antarctic summer, beginning in the latter part of the year and continuing into the early months of the following year, before the onset of the long polar winter. During this period, bases are resupplied and prepared to sustain personnel throughout the winter months until the next Operation Deep Freeze mission.

==== Operation Deep Freeze I ====
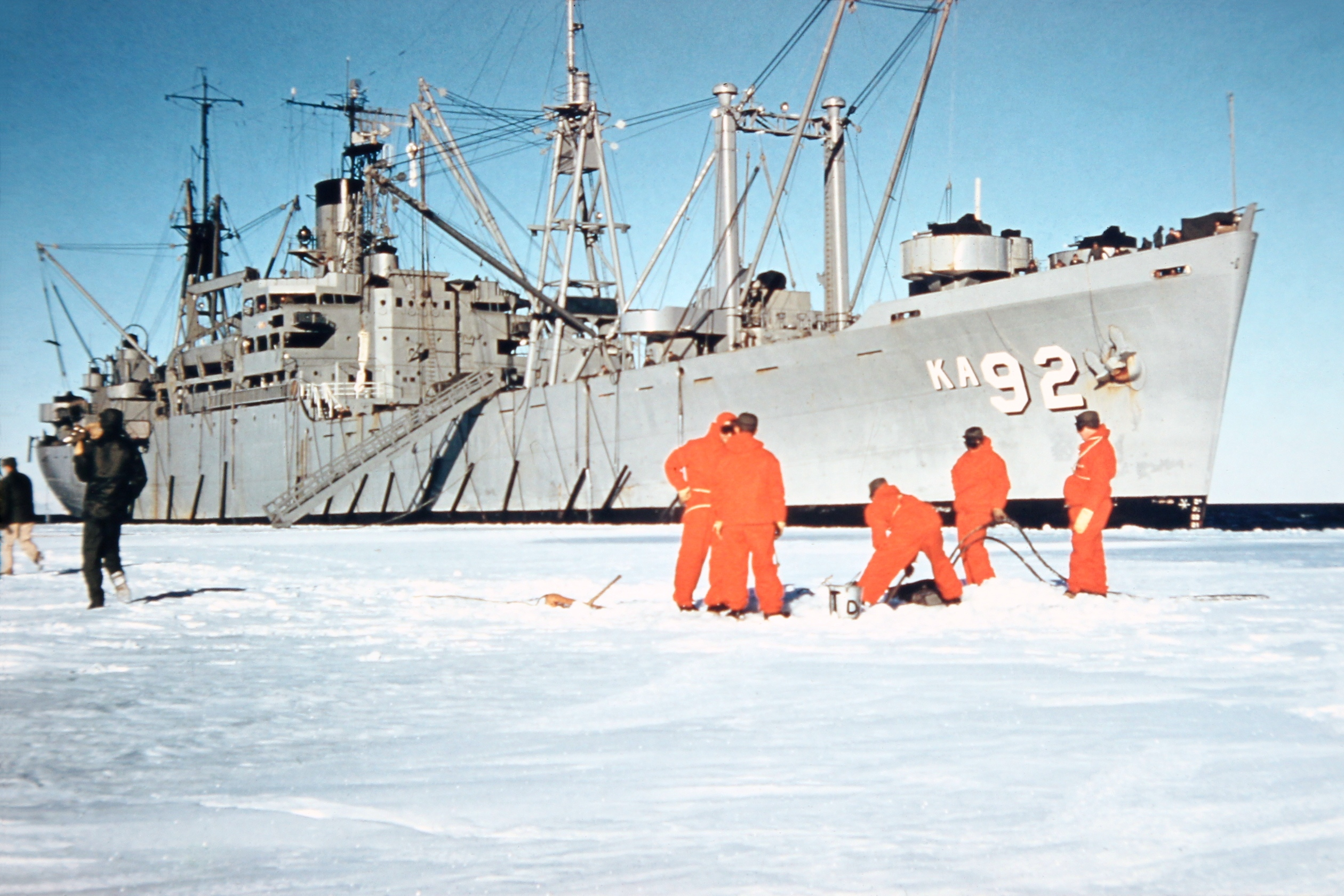
USS Wyandot mooring at McMurdo Station (Dec 1955)

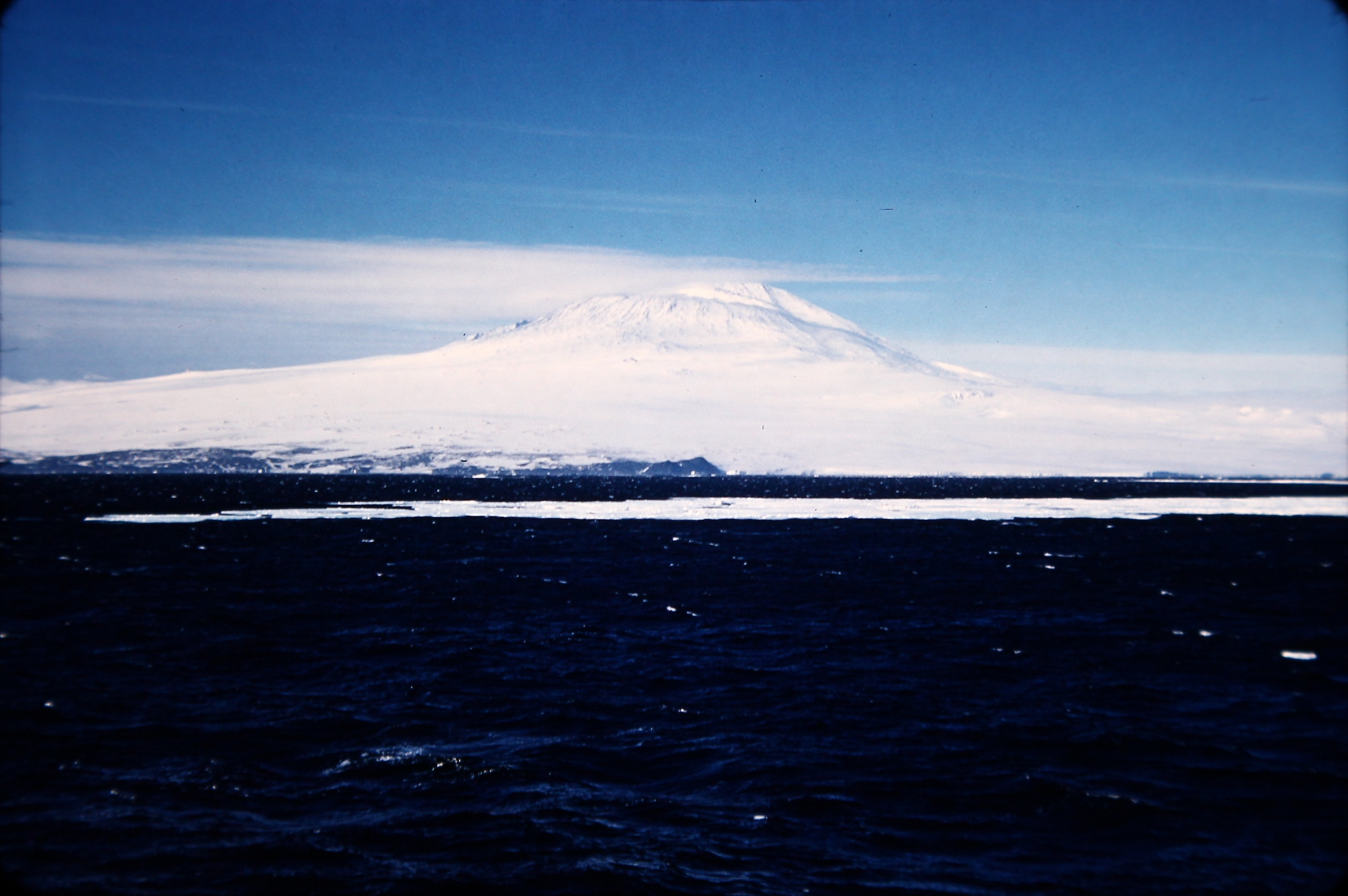
Mount Erebus in December 1955

The impetus behind Operation Deep Freeze I was the International Geophysical Year, a collaborative scientific effort involving 40 nations to conduct earth science research from the North Pole to the South Pole and various locations in between. As part of this initiative, the United States, along with New Zealand, the United Kingdom, France, Japan, Norway, Chile, Argentina, and the Soviet Union, committed to conducting research in Antarctica, the least explored region on Earth. The primary objectives were to enhance global understanding of Antarctic hydrography and weather systems, study glacial movements, and investigate marine life in the region.

The U.S. Navy was tasked with providing logistical support for U.S. scientists participating in the International Geophysical Year (IGY) studies. Rear Admiral Richard E. Byrd was appointed as the officer in charge of the operation.

In 1955, Task Force 43, commanded by Rear Admiral George J. Dufek, was established to provide logistical support for the expedition. Operation Deep Freeze I focused on constructing a permanent research station, laying the groundwork for more extensive scientific research in subsequent Deep Freeze missions. The expedition took place during the Antarctic summer from November 1955 to April 1956 and was documented by both the U.S. Navy and Walt Disney Studios. For having designed the emblem of Task Force 43, Walt Disney became an honorary member of the expedition.

The ships of Task Force 43 were augmented by a specially trained Navy Construction Battalion, established at the Naval Construction Battalion Center in Davisville, Rhode Island. Additionally, several aircraft were included to support the logistics and operations of the expedition.

On 31 October 1956, the first aircraft to ever touch down at the South Pole skidded to a halt atop the Antarctic ice sheet at 90 degrees South latitude. The U.S. Navy R4D, piloted by Lieutenant Commander Conrad C. "Gus" Shinn, included officer Frederick Ferrara as part of its crew. Immediately after the plane halted, keeping its engines active to prevent freeze-up, George J. Dufek exited the aircraft alongside pilot Douglas Cordiner to plant the flag of the United States. They were the first individuals to stand at this location since Briton Robert Falcon Scott did so over 40 years prior. Notably, Norwegian Roald Amundsen had reached the South Pole before Scott, and his party successfully completed the 800-mile return journey, while Scott's did not survive the return trip.

This flight was part of the expeditions conducted for the International Geophysical Year (IGY). It represented not only the first aircraft to land at the South Pole but also the first time that Americans had set foot there. The aircraft was named Que Sera, Sera, after the eponymous song, and is currently on display at the National Naval Aviation Museum in Pensacola, Florida.

This event marked the beginning of the establishment of the first permanent base at the South Pole, achieved through airlift operations to support the International Geophysical Year. Commissioned on 1 January 1957, the original station, known as "Old Byrd," operated for approximately four years before it began to collapse under the weight of the accumulating snow. In 1960, construction of a second underground station began in a nearby location, which was used until 1972. Afterward, it was converted into a summer-only field camp until its abandonment in the 2004 to 2005 season.

Additionally, the mission's second base, Byrd Station, was established by the U.S. Navy in West Antarctica for Operation Deep Freeze II during the International Geophysical Year. The airfield built to support Operation Deep Freeze was later named Williams Field.

==== Subsequent missions ====
Operation Deep Freeze activities were succeeded by subsequent missions, beginning with Operation Deep Freeze II and continuing in numerical sequence. In 1960, during the fifth mission, the naming convention changed to reflect the year of the operation.

Operation Deep Freeze I, Operation Deep Freeze II, and Operation Deep Freeze III laid the groundwork for the United States' participation in the International Geophysical Year, which began on 1 July 1957. During Operation Deep Freeze I, the U.S. Navy's Mobile Construction Battalion established Little America V in Kainan Bay and a base at McMurdo Sound. In Operation Deep Freeze II, the battalion expanded the U.S. presence by constructing Byrd Station and Amundsen–Scott South Pole Station.

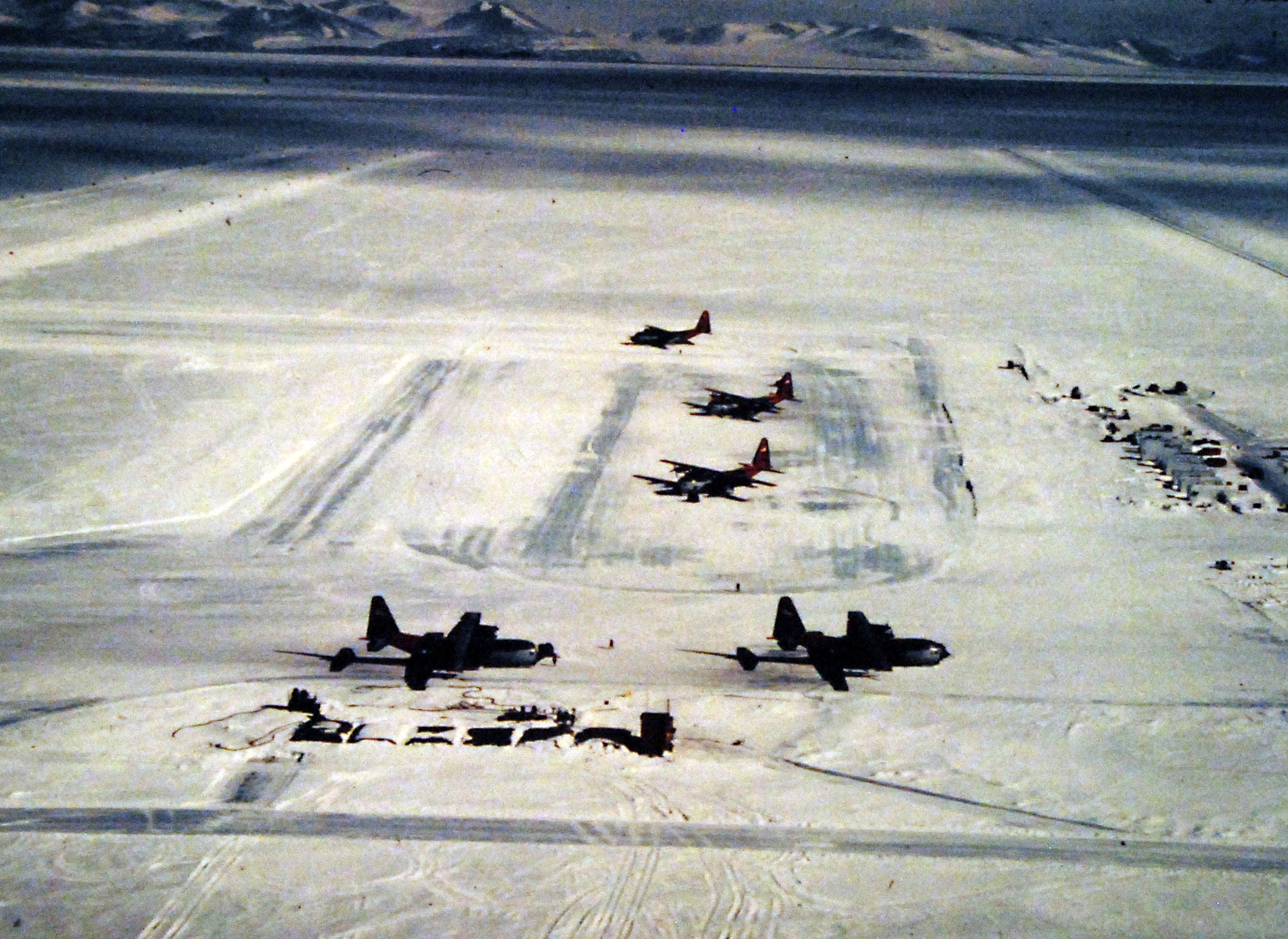
LC-130 of Antarctic Development Squadron Six (VXE-6) at the McMurdo Sound Ice Runway during Operation Deep Freeze '80

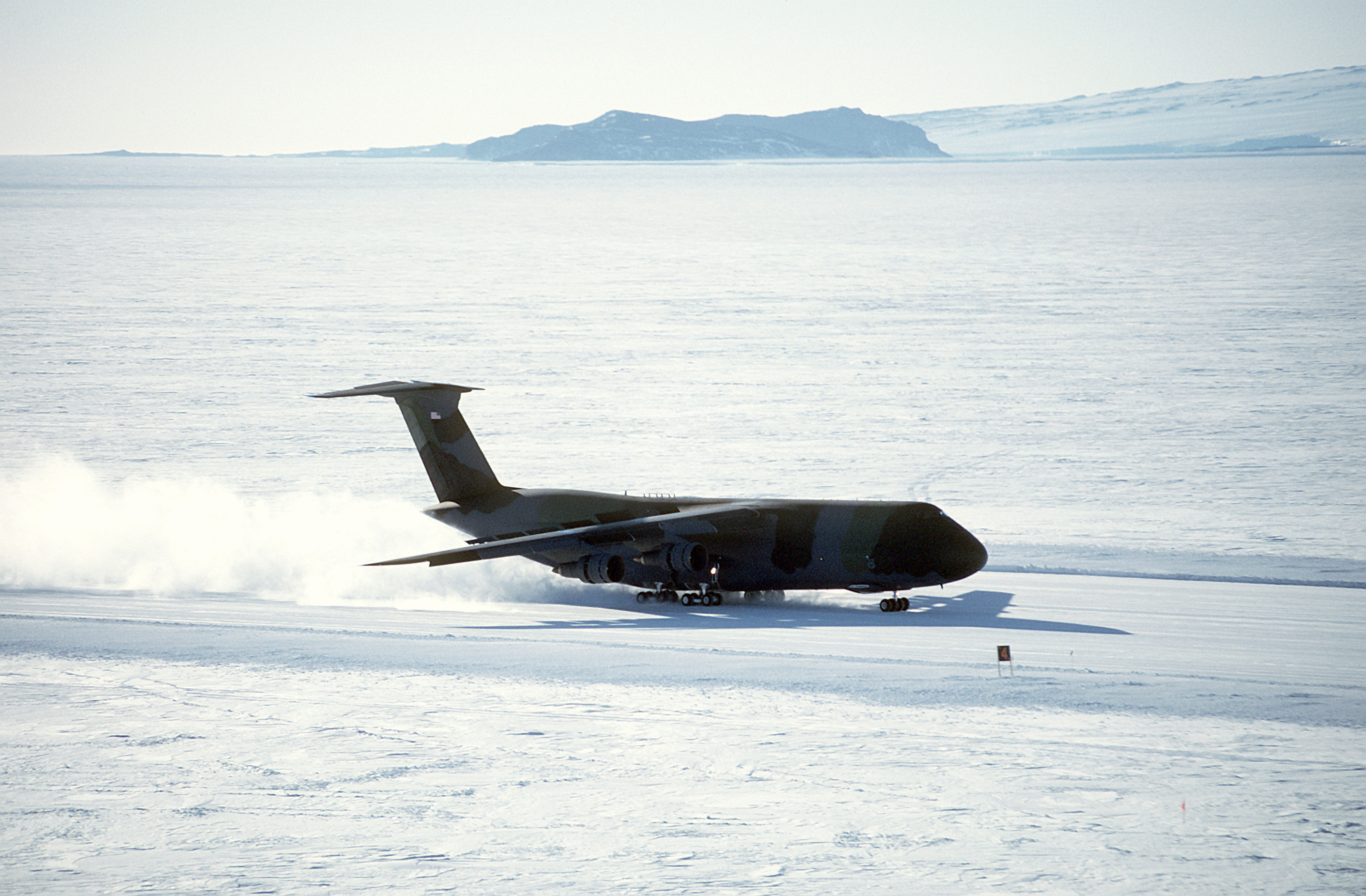
C-5B landing on the McMurdo Sound Ice Runway during Operation Deep Freeze '90

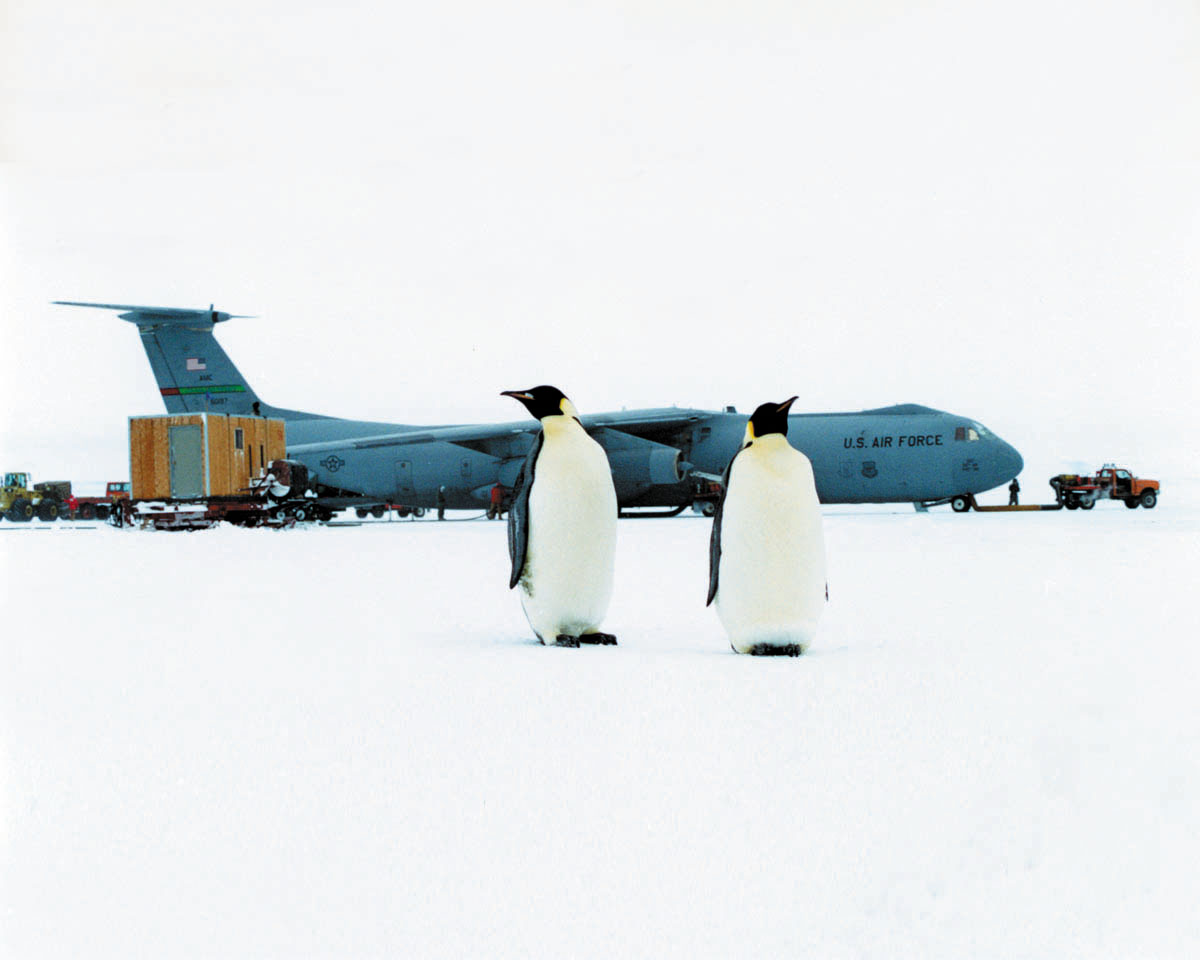
U.S. Air Force Lockheed C-141 Starlifter participating in Operation Deep Freeze with penguins

The U.S. Coast Guard occasionally participated in Operation Deep Freeze, with vessels such as the USCGC Westwind (WAGB-281), USCGC Northwind, USCGC Polar Sea, and USCGC Glacier providing support at various times. The U.S. Navy's Antarctic Development Squadron Six had been conducting scientific and military missions in both Antarctica and Greenland, operating from Williams Field since 1975. The 109th Airlift Wing of the Air National Guard, which operates ski-equipped LC-130 aircraft, has supported National Science Foundation missions in Antarctica since 1988. The official U.S. Navy command overseeing Antarctic operations was U.S. Naval Support Force Antarctica (NSFA), Terminal Operations.

In early 1996, the United States National Guard announced that the 109th Airlift Wing, based at Schenectady County Airport in Scotia, New York, would assume full responsibility for Antarctic airlift operations from the U.S. Navy by 1999. The mission would be entirely funded by the National Science Foundation, and the 109th Airlift Wing anticipated adding approximately 235 full-time personnel to support the operation. The transition from Navy leadership to the National Guard was primarily a cost-saving measure driven by post-Cold War budget reductions.

The possibility of the Air National Guard assuming operational control of Antarctic airlift operations first emerged in 1988. At the time, the 109th Airlift Wing had been notified that one of the Distant Early Warning Line (DEW) radar sites it supported in Greenland was being shut down, with others soon to follow. This development threatened to leave the unit without a primary mission. Meanwhile, the 109th had been monitoring U.S. Navy LC-130 operations supporting the National Science Foundation in Antarctica.

Due to an aging aircraft fleet and the extensive maintenance requirements of its LC-130s, the Navy asked the 109th if it could provide limited emergency search and rescue (SAR) support for Operation Deep Freeze for two years. The Air Guard agreed, initially without any intention of taking over the mission. However, the 109th saw little benefit in deploying its aircraft to Antarctica solely to wait for SAR missions. It proposed assisting in cargo transport to the South Pole, a request the Navy initially resisted due to differences in procedures and cargo configurations. Eventually, the Navy agreed, and the 109th began supplementing airlift operations.

The primary mission of both the U.S. Navy and the Air National Guard LC-130s was to transport fuel and supplies to the NSF's South Pole Station, ensuring that personnel could endure the isolation of the Antarctic winter, which lasted from February to October.

In 1990, the Air National Guard formed a working group to evaluate the feasibility of assuming operational control of Antarctic airlift missions. The following year, discussions began between the Air National Guard, the Air Staff, and the U.S. Navy. One of the key challenges was persuading the Air Staff to commit long-term resources to an area that, due to international treaties, had not been designated as a warfighting region.

Since the mid-1970s, the Air Guard had supported military operations in Greenland and the Arctic, including classified U.S. Navy missions, using the ski-equipped LC-130s of the 109th Airlift Wing. Drawing on this experience, the Air Guard successfully argued that maintaining the capability for rapid and reliable air access to both polar regions was in the nation's best interest.

In March 1993, the U.S. Navy hosted a two-day workshop with representatives from the National Science Foundation, the Air National Guard, and other stakeholders to evaluate logistics support options for Operation Deep Freeze. That same year, the Air Directorate of the National Guard Bureau drafted a preliminary concept of operations for the mission.

In February 1996, a formal decision was made to transfer responsibility for Operation Deep Freeze, along with all LC-130H aircraft operating under the U.S. Department of Defense, to the Air National Guard. By September 1996, senior officers from the 109th Airlift Wing briefed the National Guard Bureau on their operational plans and the progress of their preparations to assume full control of the mission.

Under the transition plan developed by the Air National Guard, the organization would gradually assume responsibility for the United States Antarctic Program's airlift operations. During the October 1996 to March 1997 operating season, the ANG would continue to augment the U.S. Navy. By the end of the October 1997 to March 1998 season, the ANG would take command of the program. In the third year of the transition (October 1998 – March 1999), the U.S. Navy would provide limited support before the ANG assumed full control the following year.

Throughout the transition, seven LC-130 aircraft would operate in Antarctica, staging from Christchurch International Airport in Christchurch, New Zealand, to McMurdo Station. Personnel involved in the mission included traditional Guardsmen, technicians, and a cadre of Active Guard Reservists brought on specifically to support Operation Deep Freeze. Upon full transition, the 109th Airlift Wing would maintain a fleet of ten LC-130s, consisting of four upgraded aircraft already in service, three newly acquired aircraft, and three transferred from the U.S. Navy.

The Air National Guard estimated that consolidating the operation under the 109th Airlift Wing would result in annual cost savings ranging from US$5 million to US$15 million. The transition process officially began in March 1996.

By 1999, the United States Navy had transferred military support operations for Antarctica to the United States Air Force and its contractor, the Raytheon Polar Services Company. Operation Deep Freeze was subsequently managed by the U.S. Air Force and Air National Guard personnel assigned to Air National Guard Detachment 13. This detachment was a subordinate unit that reported administratively to the Air National Guard Readiness Center (ANGRC) at Andrews Air Force Base, Maryland, and operationally to United States Pacific Command (USPACOM) in Honolulu, Hawaii.

Until its deactivation in 2005, Detachment 13 consisted of a full-time officer and four full-time non-commissioned officers responsible for logistics, communications, security forces, and information management. These personnel remained in New Zealand year-round to support Antarctic operations.

Following the detachment's deactivation, operational command was transferred to the Commander, Thirteenth Air Force, under USPACOM. In 2005, through the Office of the Secretary of Defense, the Commander of USPACOM was designated to oversee Joint Task Force Support Forces Antarctica (JTF SFA), which manages Operation Deep Freeze. This responsibility was delegated to the Commander of Pacific Air Forces, who then assigned primary execution of the mission to the Commander of Thirteenth Air Force.

===== 21st century =====
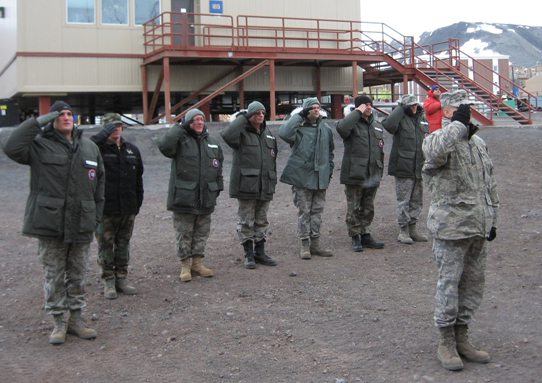
Airmen salute the last LC-130 to depart from Antarctica in 2010

United States civilian and scientific operations in Antarctica are overseen by the United States Antarctic Program (USAP) and the National Science Foundation (NSF). Military support missions, primarily flown from Christchurch International Airport, take place during the Antarctic summer season, from late September to early March. These missions are conducted by the 109th Airlift Wing, based in Scotia, New York.

The ski-equipped LC-130 Hercules aircraft serve as the backbone of Operation Deep Freeze, providing essential logistical support by transporting cargo and personnel to remote research stations across the continent. These air operations are supplemented by the United States Coast Guard icebreaker USCGC Polar Star, which assists with icebreaking and maritime logistics. Additional support is provided by the Air Force Materiel Command and the Military Sealift Command.

During the operational season, the United States Air Force's 13th Air Expeditionary Group deploys to Christchurch, New Zealand, to coordinate and execute aerial logistics for Operation Deep Freeze.

A documentary on the early missions was featured in Ice Eagles: An Account of American Aviation in Antarctica, a film that explores the history of U.S. aviation in the region. The documentary was released on DVD in 2018.

Lockheed Martin is the current prime contractor for the National Science Foundation's United States Antarctic Program. The contract was awarded following a competitive bid solicitation process that lasted nearly four years, with the award announced in a press release by the NSF on 28 December 2011. Support operations officially began on 1 April 2012. The contract, which was initially contemplated for a period of 11 1/2 years, supports various logistical and operational needs for the program.

In the 2021 to 2022 season, Operation Deep Freeze transported 100 personnel and nearly 50,000 pounds of food by air to McMurdo Station.

== Attempts to claim Antarctic land ==
In 1939, U.S. President Franklin D. Roosevelt instructed members of the United States Antarctic Service Expedition to initiate efforts toward claiming portions of Antarctica as U.S. territory. While such claims were seemingly made by members of this and subsequent expeditions, they were never formalized before the establishment of the Antarctic Treaty System in 1959. Some U.S. publications depicted Antarctica as a U.S. territory during this period, and the U.S. Department of Defense has stated that the United States has a strong basis for an Antarctic claim due to its activities prior to 1959.

Under the Antarctic Treaty, territorial claims cannot be expanded or newly asserted, making it difficult for the U.S. to establish an official claim. If the U.S. were to claim a portion of Antarctica, it would likely face international challenges and be rejected by countries that are signatories to the treaty, which prohibits new claims and reinforces Antarctica's status as a region dedicated to peaceful scientific research.

== Bibliography ==
- Byrd, Richard (1938). Alone. New York: G. P. Putnam's Sons.
- Stanton, W. R. (1975). The Great United States Exploring Expedition of 1838–1842. Berkeley: University of California Press. ISBN 9780520025578.
