= Davis Islands (Antarctica) =

Island group

The Davis Islands (66°40′S 108°25′E) are a small group of rocky islands lying in the west part of the entrance to Vincennes Bay. First mapped (1955) by Gardner Dean Blodgett from aerial photographs taken by U.S. Navy Operation Highjump (1947). Named by Advisory Committee on Antarctic Names (US-ACAN) for Malcolm Davis, bird curator of the zoo, Washington, DC, who served as biologist aboard the ship as ornithologist during U.S. Navy Operation Windmill (1947–48).

== See also ==
- List of antarctic and sub-antarctic islands
