= Cape Bienvenue =

Headland of Antarctica

Coordinates: 66°43′S 140°31′E

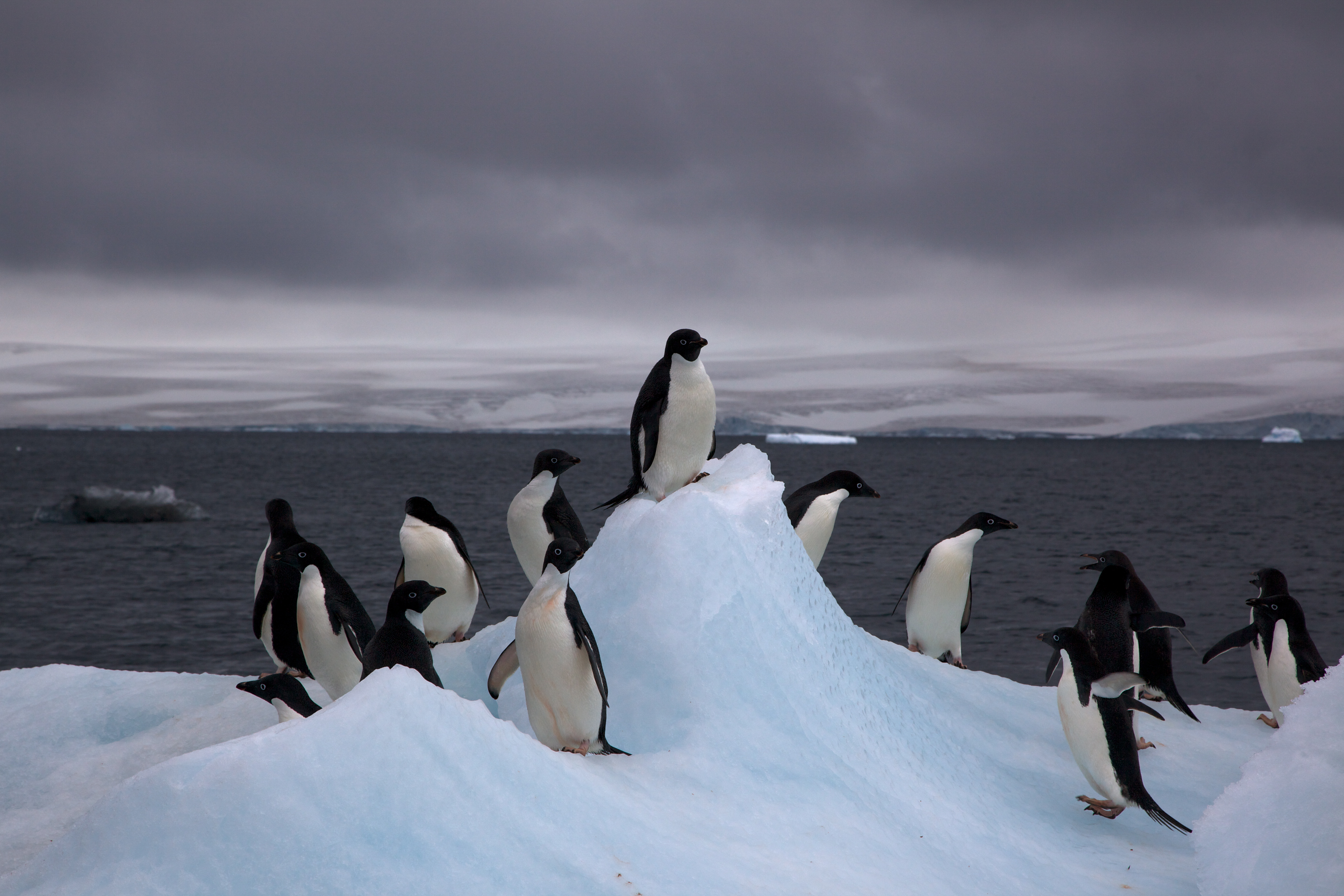
Adélie penguins breed in the IBA

Cape Bienvenue is a small rocky cape which is partially ice-covered, 44 m, forming the east side of the entrance to Piner Bay. Photographed from the air by U.S. Navy Operation Highjump, 1946–47. Charted and named by the French Antarctic Expedition under Barre, 1951–52, who established an astronomical control station on the cape. Bienvenue is a French word meaning welcome, and describes the pleasure of the French party at finding a cape not shown on previous charts where a landing could be made.

== Important Bird Area ==
A 15 ha site comprising all the ice-free area at the cape has been identified as an Important Bird Area (IBA) by BirdLife International because it supports some 35,000 breeding pairs of Adélie penguins (as estimated from 2011 satellite imagery).
