= USCGC Burton Island =

United States Coast Guard icebreaker

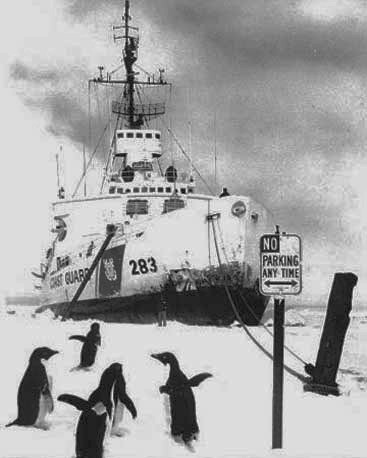
- USCGC Burton Island (WAGB-283)

History

United States
- Name: USS Burton Island (AG-88)
- Namesake: An island off the coast of Delaware
- Builder: Western Pipe and Steel Company (WPS), San Pedro, California
- Cost: US$9.880,037.00
- Laid down: 15 March 1946
- Launched: 30 April 1946
- Christened: 1946
- Completed: 1946
- Commissioned: 28 December 1946
- Decommissioned: 15 December 1966
- Maiden voyage: 17 January 1947
- In service: 8 December 1946
- Out of service: 15 December 1966
- Stricken: 1966
- Identification: AG-88 (1946); AGB-1 (1949); Call sign: NRFC
- Nickname(s): B.I.
- Fate: Transferred to U.S. Coast Guard

United States
- Name: USCGC Burton Island (WAGB-283)
- Recommissioned: 15 December 1966
- Decommissioned: 9 May 1978
- Home port: Long Beach, California (1966); Government Island, Alameda, California (1977)
- Identification: Call sign: NEVK
- Nickname(s): Hurtin' Burton; B.I.; White Antarctic Garbage Barge
- Fate: Sold for scrap, 17 August 1980

General characteristics
- Class & type: Wind-class icebreaker
- Displacement: 6,515 tons (1945)
- Length: 269 ft (82 m)
- Beam: 63 ft 6 in (19.35 m)
- Draft: 25 ft 9 in (7.85 m)
- Installed power: 6 × Fairbanks-Morse 8-1/8OP 10-cylinder opposed-piston engines (6 × 2,000 hp)
- Propulsion: Diesel-electric; 2 × Westinghouse Electric DC electric motors driving aft propellers; 1 × 3,000 shp (2,200 kW) Westinghouse DC electric motor driving the detachable and seldom-used bow propeller
- Speed: 13.4 knots (24.8 km/h; 15.4 mph)
- Range: 32,485 mi (52,280 km)
- Endurance: 13.4 knots (24.8 km/h; 15.4 mph) (maximum); 11.6 knots (21.5 km/h; 13.3 mph) (economic)
- Boats & landing craft carried: 4 lifeboats. 1 LCVP. 1 Greenland Cruiser, later Arctic Survey Boat (ASB)
- Complement: 219 officers and men
- Sensors & processing systems: Electronics: Radar SPS-10B; SPS-53A; SPS-6C (1967)<; Sonar
- Armament: 1 twin mount Mk 12 5"/38 caliber gun, forward main deck. 1 twin mount 40mm/60, forward O-2 deck. M2 Browning machine guns and small arms. (1946); M2 Browning machine guns, M60 machine guns, and small arms (1966)
- Aircraft carried: 2 single rotor helicopters and air detachment personnel
- Aviation facilities: Flight deck and retractable hangar with aircraft service capabilities

USS Burton Island (AG-88) was a United States Navy Wind-class icebreaker that was later recommissioned in the United States Coast Guard as the USCGC Burton Island (WAGB-283). She was named after an island near the coast of Delaware.

== Construction ==
Burton Island was one of the icebreakers designed by Lt Cdr Edward Thiele and Gibbs & Cox of New York, who modeled them after plans for European icebreakers he obtained before the start of World War II. She was the sixth of seven completed ships of the Wind-class of icebreakers operated by the United States Coast Guard. Her keel was laid on 15 March 1946 at Western Pipe and Steel Company shipyards in San Pedro, California, she was launched on 30 April 1946, and commissioned on 28 December 1946 with Commander Gerald L. Ketchum in command.

Wind-class icebreakers had hulls of unprecedented strength and structural integrity, with a relatively short length in proportion to the great power developed, a cut away forefoot, rounded bottom, and fore, aft and side heeling tanks. Diesel electric machinery was chosen for its controllability and resistance to damage. Burton Island was built during peacetime, so she had a much lighter armament than her war-built sisters, one 5 in (130 mm) 38 cal. deck gun and three quad-mounted Bofors 40 mm anti-aircraft autocannons when in Navy service, and unarmed for the Coast Guard.

== Ship's history ==
=== U.S. Navy, 1947–1966 ===
On 17 January 1947, Burton Island, loaded with supplies, steamed from San Diego to the Ross Sea, Antarctica where she met with units of TF 68 on the first Antarctica Development project, Operation Highjump. After returning from Antarctica, Burton Island departed 25 July 1947 for the Point Barrow expedition to Alaska.

From April 1948 to December 1956, Burton Island participated in 19 Arctic and Alaskan cruises, including Operation Windmill. During Operation Windmill in the Antarctic, Burton Island was the flagship of Gerald L. Ketchum, commander of Task Force 39. Duties on the cruises varied including, supply activities, helicopter reconnaissance of ice flows, scientific surveys, underwater demolition surveys, and convoy exercises.

In March 1949, Burton Island was redesignated AGB-1.

In February 1958, Burton Island assisted Sōya, which had become iced in near Antarctica carrying a replacement crew of Japanese geophysical researchers. A helicopter carried out the original crew, stranded at the Japanese base at Showa Station, but was forced to leave 15 dogs behind, including Taro and Jiro, who survived an Antarctic winter without human accompaniment.

One prominent excursion was with the submarines USS Seadragon (SSN-584) and USS Skate (SSN-578) in 1962, in which torpedoes were tested underneath the polar ice pack after the two submarines had rendezvoused at the North Pole.

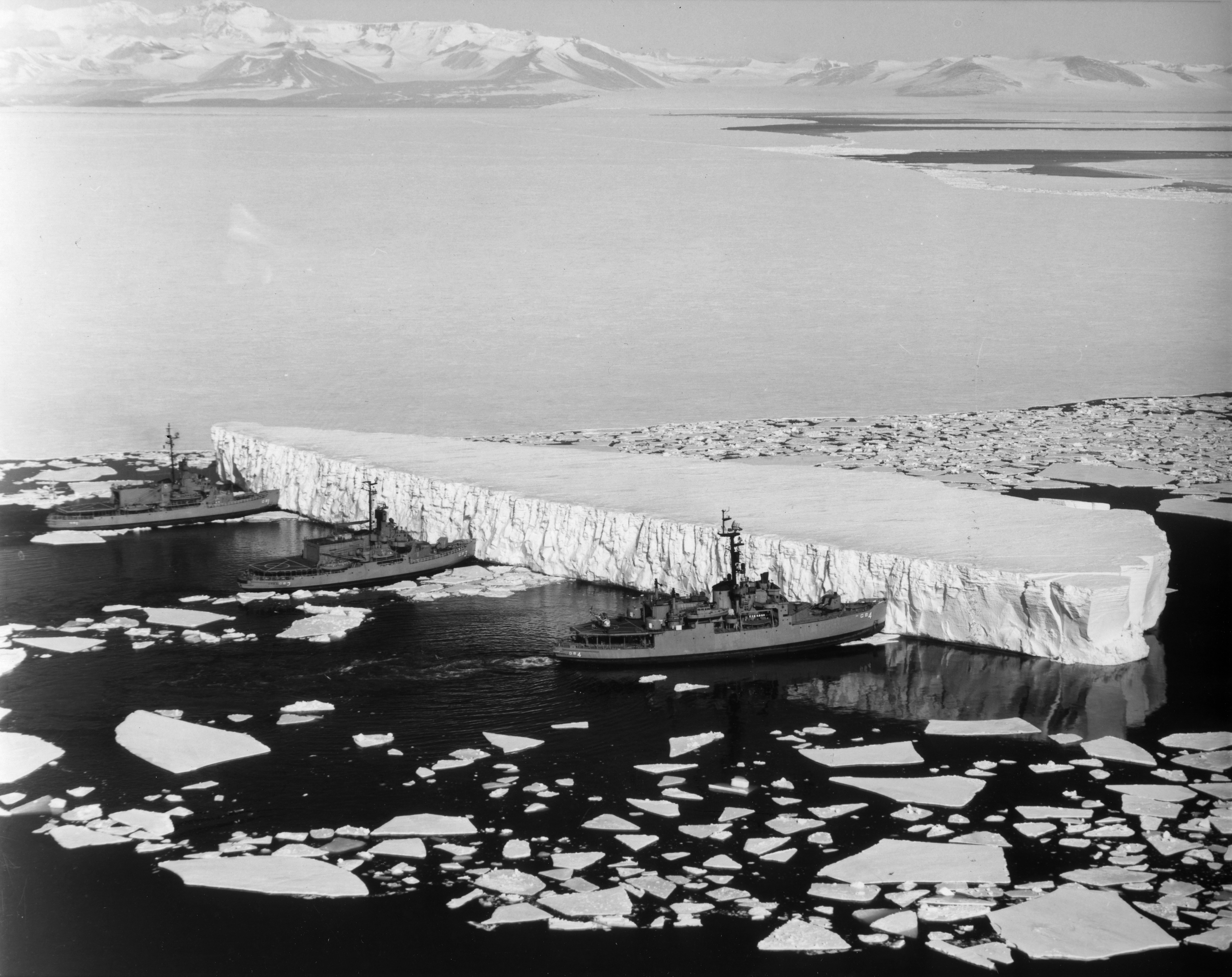
Burton Island, Atka (AGB-3), and Glacier (AGB-4) pushing an iceberg out of the channel in the "Silent Land" near McMurdo Station, Antarctica, 29 December 1965.

=== US Coast Guard, 1966–1978 ===
On 15 December 1966, the U.S. Navy transferred the vessel, along with all of its icebreakers, to the United States Coast Guard and it was renumbered WAGB-283. After its transfer, Burton Island was stationed at Long Beach, California and used for icebreaking operations. Starting in 1967 through 1978, Burton Island went on eight different Deep Freeze operations to the Antarctic. In the operations, Burton Island was responsible for creating and maintaining aids to navigation, clearing channels through the ice for supply vessels, laying cables, delivering and dispatching the U.S. Mail at remote stations and vessels, search and rescue, fisheries patrol, law enforcement, and giving dental and medical treatment at remote Native Alaskan communities. In addition to Deep Freeze operations, Burton Island served as a floating platform for scientific surveys and research around Alaska and other isolated polar areas. Burton Island also conducted numerous search and rescue missions.

From October 1967 to April 1968 she participated in Operation Deep Freeze 1968. From October 1968 to April 1969 she participated in Operation Deep Freeze 1969. From November 1969 to April 1970 she participated in Operation Deep Freeze 1970 and her accompanying icebreaker USCGC Edisto (WAGB-284) was disabled. From November 1970 to April 1971 she participated in Operation Deep Freeze 1971 and again her accompanying icebreaker USCGC Staten Island (WAGB-278) was disabled. From August to September 1971 she conducted an oceanographic survey along the Alaska North Slope. From February to March 1972 she conducted a scientific survey in Cook Inlet, Alaska. From November 1972 to April 1973 she participated in Operation Deep Freeze 1973. From June to July 1973 she conducted oceanographic research in Alaskan waters. From November 1974 to April 1975 she participated in Operation Deep Freeze 1975. From 13 November 1975 to 26 February 1976 she participated in Operation Deep Freeze 1976. From July to September 1976 she deployed to the Arctic. From 9 November 1976 to 7 April 1977 she participated in Operation Deep Freeze 1977. During that deployment in December 1976, she carried out numerous search-and-rescue missions at Wellington, New Zealand, following a torrential downpour. From 9 July 1977 to 8 September 1977 she undertook a cruise to the Arctic Ocean, during which time her crew constructed several radar navigation towers along the north coast of Alaska and conducted gravity surveys of the Arctic Ocean. From 20 November 1977 to 1 April 1978 she participated in Operation Deep Freeze 1978. From mid-1977 to 9 May 1978 she was stationed at Naval Supply Center Oakland in Oakland, California and used for icebreaking.

=== Decommissioning and sale ===
She was decommissioned on 9 May 1978. An excerpt from a Maritime Administration letter dated 21 November 1995 indicates her ultimate fate:

The Maritime Administration sold the vessel by auction under PD-X-1033 dtd. 17 August 1980. The vessel was awarded to Levin Metals Corporation, San Jose, California on 7 October 1980, under contract No. MA-9868 for $261,000.00 The "Burton Island" was scrapped as of 28 April 1982.
