= Piner Bay =

Coordinates: 66°43′S 140°17′E

Piner Bay is an open bay 15 kilometres (8 nmi) long and 3.7 kilometres (2 nmi) wide between Cape Bienvenue and the east side of Astrolabe Glacier Tongue.

Discovered on January 30, 1840, by the United States Exploring Expedition under Wilkes, who named it for Thomas Piner, signal quartermaster on the USEE flagship Vincennes. This feature correlates closely with portions of the sketch of "Piners Bay" as shown on Wilkes' chart of 1840.
