= Malcolm Davis =

American ornithologist

Malcolm Davis (1899 – October 4, 1977) was an American ornithologist and bird keeper.

== Early life ==
Davis was born at Washington, D.C. in 1899. He studied at the University of Maryland, and later graduated from George Washington University with a degree in zoology. During World War I, he served in the Army Signal Corps.

== Career ==
Davis joined the National Zoological Park in 1927 and eventually became the head keeper of the bird division. Throughout his career, Davis undertook expeditions to every continent, including Antarctica on three occasions. He successfully procured diverse specimens, including notable megafauna like the Sumatran tiger and Indian rhinoceros. Davis accompanied Richard E. Byrd to conduct surveys of the Davis Islands, which were subsequently named in his honor. Notably, he also transported live emperor penguins to the National Zoological Park on March 5, 1940. He kept some alive for six years, a record at the time.

Davis took part in Operation Windmill to collect animals such as penguins and leopard seals. He traveled on board the USCGC Edisto.

Davis retired from the zoo in 1960, but remained as a consultant to the National Wildlife Federation. He also took care of a monkey colony at the Woodard Research Corporation in Herndon, Virginia.

He died at his home in Herndon, on October 4, 1970, of a heart attack.
