= Gerald Ketchum =

American naval officer (1908–1992)

Gerald L. Ketchum
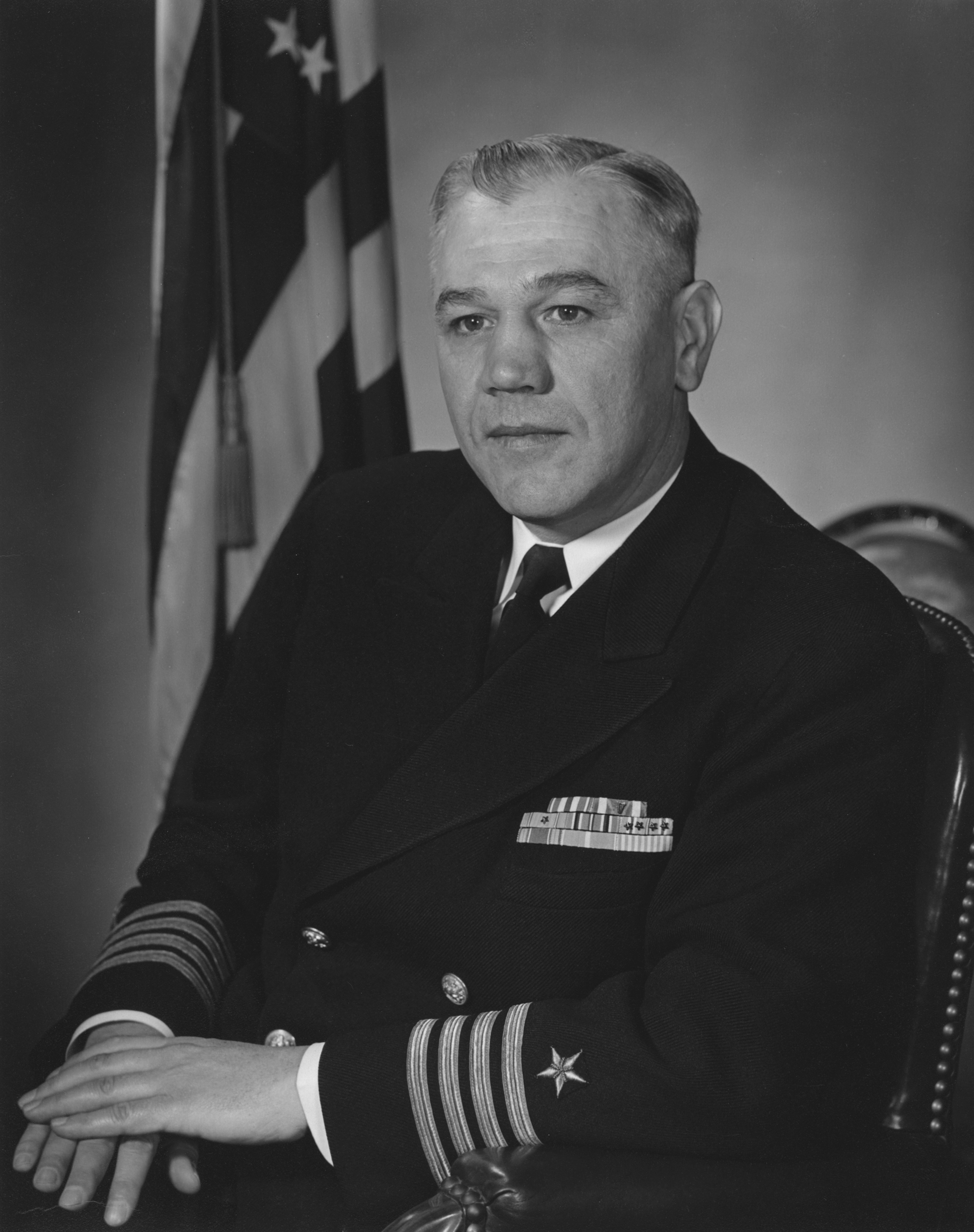
- Born: 5 December 1908; Bellingham, Washington
- Died: 22 August 1992 (aged 83) Plano, Texas
- Allegiance: United States of America
- Branch: United States Navy
- Rank: Rear Admiral
- Conflicts: World War II; Korean War
- Awards: Silver Star; Legion of Merit; Navy Commendation Medal

Rear Admiral Gerald L. Ketchum (5 December 1908 – 22 August 1992) was a career officer in the United States Navy. He served during World War II and the Korean War. He was a recipient of the Silver Star and also participated in four expeditions to Antarctica.

== Navy career ==
Gerald Lyle Ketchum was born in Bellingham, Washington on 5 December 1908 and graduated from the United States Naval Academy in 1931.

=== World War II ===
During World War II Ketchum was a lieutenant commander and was placed in command of the destroyer USS Perkins (DD-377) on 1 March 1943. The Perkins was employed in operations in the waters off New Guinea.

On 22 September 1943, during an operation in which his ship was assigned to screen a convoy of landing craft, Ketchum and the Perkins engaged ten attacking Japanese torpedo planes. Ketchum positioned the Perkins between the planes and the convoy, and despite being heavily strafed, simultaneously avoided two torpedoes by skillful maneuvering, shot down one torpedo plane, and assisted in the destruction of another. For this action he was later awarded the Silver Star – the Navy's third highest award for heroism.

In the early morning hours of 29 November 1943, the Perkins was rammed by an Australian troopship and sank with the loss of nine American lives. Ketchum was held accountable for the incident by a board of inquiry and, unlike most naval officers whose ships have a collision under their command, he was allowed to command ships later in his career.

=== Antarctic expeditions ===
On 28 December 1946, Ketchum became the commanding officer of newly commissioned icebreaker USS Burton Island (AG-88). The Burton Island served in Task Group 68.2 during Operation Highjump, the United States Navy Antarctic Developments Program 1946–1947; also known as the Fourth Byrd Antarctic Expedition. This was the Navy's first Antarctic expedition involving a large number of ships of various kinds and helped established the feasibility of sustained operations in the Antarctic.

He was also Commander of "Task Force 39" consisting of two ships, the Burton Island and the USS Edisto (AG-89), and 500 men for Operation Windmill, an Antarctic expedition in 1947–1948. Ketchum relinquished command of the Burton Island on 22 September 1947.

Ketchum returned to the Antarctic again when he served as Deputy Commander, United States Naval Support Force, Antarctica, during Operations Deep Freeze I and II from 1 February 1955 to 22 March 1957. He was responsible for and directly supervised the preparation and implementation of plans for the two Antarctic expeditions. This involved the design, establishment, and operation of seven widely dispersed bases constructed to support the Antarctic program of the United States National Committee for the International Geophysical Year.

He assumed command of Task Force units from 10 December 1955 to 3 February 1956 during Operation Deep Freeze I, when he skillfully directed aircraft and ship units in hazardous and difficult operations. During Operation Deep Freeze II, he assumed command of the Task Force from 14 September to 20 December 1956, during which period he conducted through the dangerous Antarctic ice pack without damage the largest convoy of ships ever deployed to the Antarctic. From 14 January to 27 February 1957, he assumed command of a task group of three ships and established a base on the Knox Coast under extremely adverse ice conditions. For his service in these operations, Ketchum received the Legion of Merit.

== Retirement and death ==
Upon his retirement from the Navy he was promoted to the rank of rear admiral in recognition of his wartime service. He died in Plano, Texas on 22 August 1992.

== Legacy ==
Ketchum Ridge in Antarctica is named after him.

== Awards ==
- Silver Star
- Legion of Merit
- Navy Commendation Medal with "V" device
- American Defense Service Medal
- American Campaign Medal with "FLEET" clasp
- Asiatic-Pacific Campaign Medal with four battle stars
- World War II Victory Medal
- National Defense Service Medal
- Korea Service Medal
- Antarctic Service Medal with three service stars
- United Nations Korea Medal
