= USS Glacier (AGB-4) =

United States Navy/Coast Guard Glacier-class icebreaker

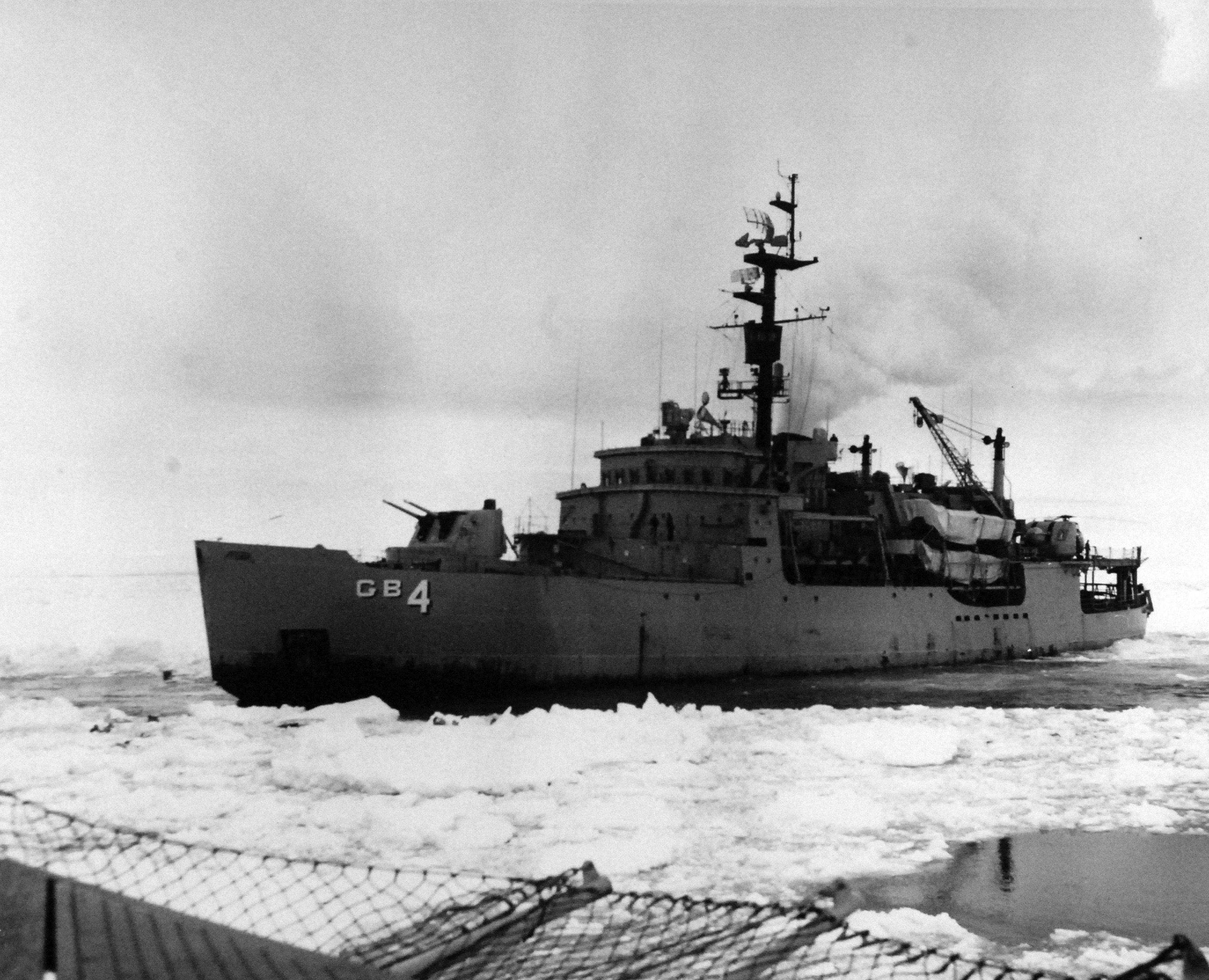
- USS Glacier (AGB-4) on August 9, 1960

History

United States
- Name: USS Glacier
- Namesake: Glacier Bay, Alaska
- Builder: Ingalls Shipbuilding, Pascagoula, Mississippi
- Yard number: 580
- Laid down: 3 August 1953
- Launched: 27 August 1954
- Sponsored by: Mrs. Roscoe F. Good
- Christened: 27 August 1954
- Commissioned: 27 May 1955
- Decommissioned: 1966
- Stricken: 30 June 1966
- Home port: Boston, Massachusetts, U.S.
- Identification: IMO number: 6123672; Hull number AGB-4
- Motto: Follow Me!
- Nickname(s): Mighty G (USN)
- Honors and awards: Navy Unit Commendation
- Fate: Transferred to the United States Coast Guard, 30 June 1966

United States
- Name: USCGC Glacier
- Acquired: 30 June 1966
- Decommissioned: 7 July 1987
- Identification: Hull number= WAGB-4
- Nickname(s): Wandering Arctic Garbage Barge; Big Red (1973)
- Fate: Broken up in 2012

General characteristics
- Type: Icebreaker
- Displacement: 8,449 long tons (8,585 t) full load
- Length: 309 ft 6 in (94.34 m)
- Beam: 74 ft (23 m)
- Draft: 29 ft (8.8 m)
- Propulsion: Diesel-electric; 10 × Fairbanks-Morse diesels; 2 × Westinghouse electric motors; 21,000 shp (16,000 kW); 2 shafts
- Speed: 17.6 knots (32.6 km/h; 20.3 mph)
- Range: 29,200 nautical miles (54,100 km; 33,600 mi) at 12 knots (22 km/h; 14 mph)
- Boats & landing craft carried: 4 lifeboats, 1 LCVP, and 1 Greenland Cruiser, later 1 Arctic Survey Boat
- Complement: 14 officers, 2 warrant officers, 225 enlisted
- Armament: 1 × twin 5 in (130 mm) guns; 3 × twin 3 in (76 mm) guns; 4 × 20 mm guns
- Aircraft carried: 2 helicopters. Air detachment: 4 officers/pilots and 10 enlisted maintenance technicians/aircrew personnel
- Aviation facilities: Flight deck with retractable hangar, and overhead crane for aircraft engine service

USS Glacier (AGB-4) (later USCGC Glacier; WAG/WAGB-4) was a U.S. Navy, then U.S. Coast Guard icebreaker which served in the first through fifteenth Operation Deep Freeze expeditions. Glacier was the first icebreaker to make her way through the frozen Bellingshausen Sea, and most of the topography in the area is named for her crew members. When built, Glacier had the largest capacity single armature DC motors ever installed on a ship. Glacier was capable of breaking ice up to 20 feet (6.1 m) thick, and of continuous breaking of 4-foot (1.2 m) thick ice at 3 knots (5.6 km/h; 3.5 mph).

Named for Glacier Bay, Alaska, USS Glacier was launched on 27 August 1954 at Ingalls Shipbuilding Corp., Pascagoula, Mississippi, sponsored by Mrs. Roscoe F. Good; and commissioned on 27 May 1955, CDR. E.H. Mayer USN, Commanding. Glacier is the only icebreaker built in the Glacier class, and was in U.S. Navy service for 11 years, and U.S. Coast Guard service for 21 years.

== Construction ==
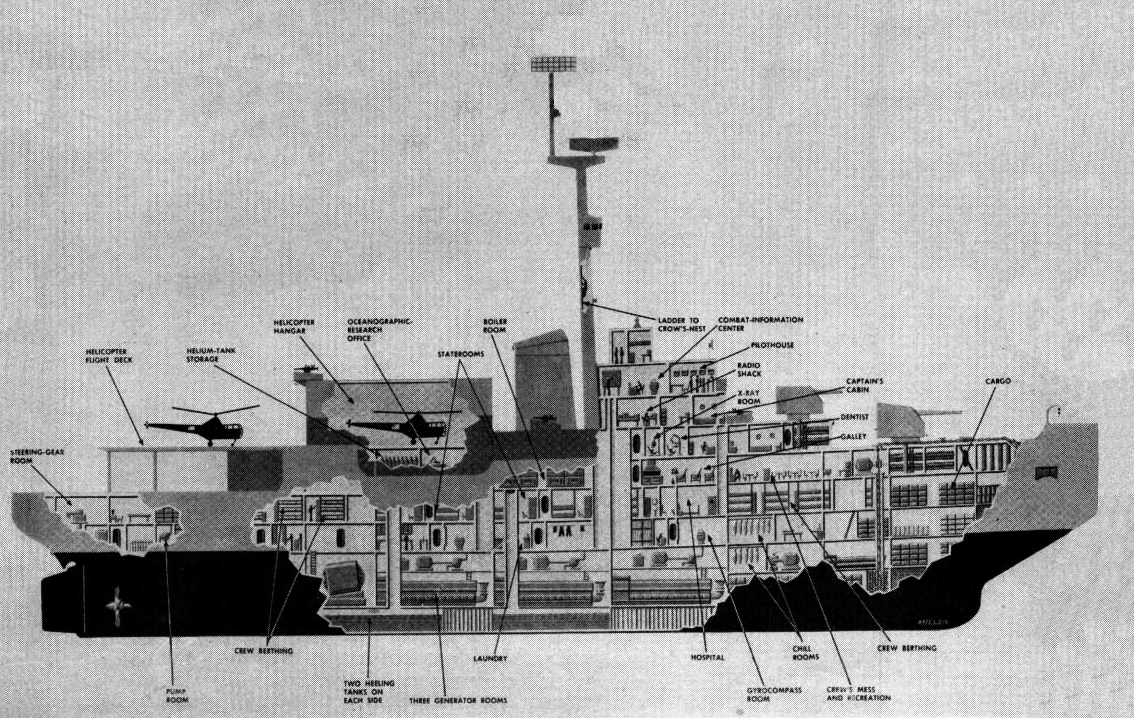
Glacier in 1956.

Glacier was essentially an improved Wind-class icebreaker, larger and more powerful. Like them, her entire hull was designed for great strength. With a relatively short length in proportion to the great power developed, her bow had the characteristic sloping forefoot that enabled her to ride up on heavy ice and break it with the weight of the vessel. The stern was similarly shaped to facilitate breaking ice while backing down. The sides of the icebreaker were rounded, with marked tumblehome, and she had fore, aft and side heeling tanks that enabled the ship to break free from ice by heeling from side to side and changing trim fore to aft. Diesel electric machinery was chosen for its controllability and resistance to damage.

== Ship's history ==
=== Antarctic operations, 1955–1960 ===
Glacier's shakedown cruise and maiden voyage were combined in "Operation Deep Freeze I", as flagship for Rear Admiral Richard E. Byrd. Her first encounter with the ice was in December 1955, breaking through the Ross Ice Pack, she carved out an ice harbor in Kainan Bay to allow the discharge of cargo from vessels at the site for Little America V. Glacier continued 400 nautical miles (740 km; 460 mi) west to break ice into an off-loading site to establish the U.S. Naval Air Facility at McMurdo Sound. In March 1956, Glacier explored the Weddell Sea. Glacier then surveyed Vincennes Bay in Wilkes Land and made the first landing in history on the Princess Martha and Princess Astrid coasts. Glacier returned to Boston, her home port, on 6 May 1956 after these accomplishments.

The ship returned to McMurdo Sound on 28 October 1956 for "Deep Freeze II", having made the earliest seasonal penetration in history. Glacier then delivered stores and supplies at McMurdo and then Little America, she led seven other ships of the Royal New Zealand Navy (RNZN) through the ice pack to the two Antarctic bases. In January 1957 she led two cargo ships into Vincennes Bay where the last of the seven American bases for the International Geophysical Year was to be constructed. Glacier departed Wilkes Station on 17 February 1957 for the United States via Melbourne, Australia when the operation was completed.

During "Deep Freeze III" and the IGY of 1957–1958, Glacier participated as a launching platform for "rockoon" tests during which balloon-lifted rockets gathered information of interest to the "Explorer" space satellite program. Additionally, Glacier continued her usual icebreaking and escort duties, and conducted oceanographic surveys in the Ross Sea.

In the summer of 1958, Glacier provided ice-escort for "Operation Sunec" for the resupply of North Polar radar and weather stations. By November 1958, however, she was again near the South Pole at McMurdo Sound, and after resupplying the base, steamed to Little America V to begin the station deactivation. Subsequently, while operating in the Terra Nova Bay on the coast of Victoria Land, she discovered two unknown islands and what was likely the largest emperor penguin rookery in the Antarctic, home of over 50,000 of the large birds. Glacier then sped to the assistance of the Belgian expedition ship RV Polarhav near Breid Bay, halfway around the Antarctic continent from the Ross Sea.

For "Operation Deep Freeze 5" in 1959–1960, Glacier sailed to McMurdo and then on an exploration of the Bellingshausen Sea. In late February 1960 Glacier raced to assist Argentine Navy icebreaker ARA General San Martín and Danish cargo ship MV Kista Dan. When this rescue mission was accomplished, Glacier sailed to Rio de Janeiro, Brazil on 2 April 1960 and provided emergency assistance to flooded areas there for twelve days. Glacier also did relief operations; providing helicopter and boat transportation, and emergency supplies to residents of Paramaribo, Suriname after the floods. Glacier then got underway for Boston, Massachusetts on 17 April 1960.

=== Antarctic operations, 1960–1966 ===
The icebreaker departed Boston on 13 October 1960 on her sixth Antarctic voyage and reached Lyttelton, New Zealand on 21 November 1960 to unload cargo. Most of December 1960 was spent in breaking a 21-nautical-mile (39 km; 24 mi) channel through McMurdo Sound to open the way for supply ships. Glacier returned to Wellington, New Zealand for repairs, and to receive the U.S. Navy Unit Commendation for her Bellingshausen Sea expedition success. She then returned to the Amundsen and Bellingshausen Seas on another expedition. Oceanographic work continued until March 1961 when she sailed for Boston, arriving on 27 April 1961.

Underway again on 8 October 1961 for "Deep Freeze 62", she loaded cargo at Lyttelton, New Zealand, in early November 1961 and entered the Ross Sea ice pack on 13 November 1961, reaching McMurdo Sound by the end of the month. After repairs at Wellington, Glacier returned to McMurdo Station and to the site of Little America V for cartographic studies. She returned to New Zealand on 6 March 1962 and then put in at Boston on 5 May 1962 after steaming 36,000 nautical miles (67,000 km; 41,000 mi).

Glacier stood out of Boston on 17 September 1962 for "Deep Freeze 63", entering the pack ice on 6 November 1962 and reaching the edge of the bay ice of McMurdo Sound a week later. Glacier sustained minor damage in the thick ice and proceeded to Wellington for repairs. On 31 December 1962, Glacier cut through McMurdo Sound en route to McMurdo Station. She continued operations off McMurdo Station through 1965. Her diverse duties included keeping the channel open for supply ships. On 29 December 1965, US ships Atka and Burton Island assisted her in pushing an iceberg out of the shipping lane. After further participation in her 11th "Operation Deep Freeze", Glacier returned to Boston in the late spring of 1966. On 1 July 1966, Glacier was struck from the Navy List, the day after her transfer to the United States Coast Guard.

=== Coast Guard operations, 1966–1987 ===
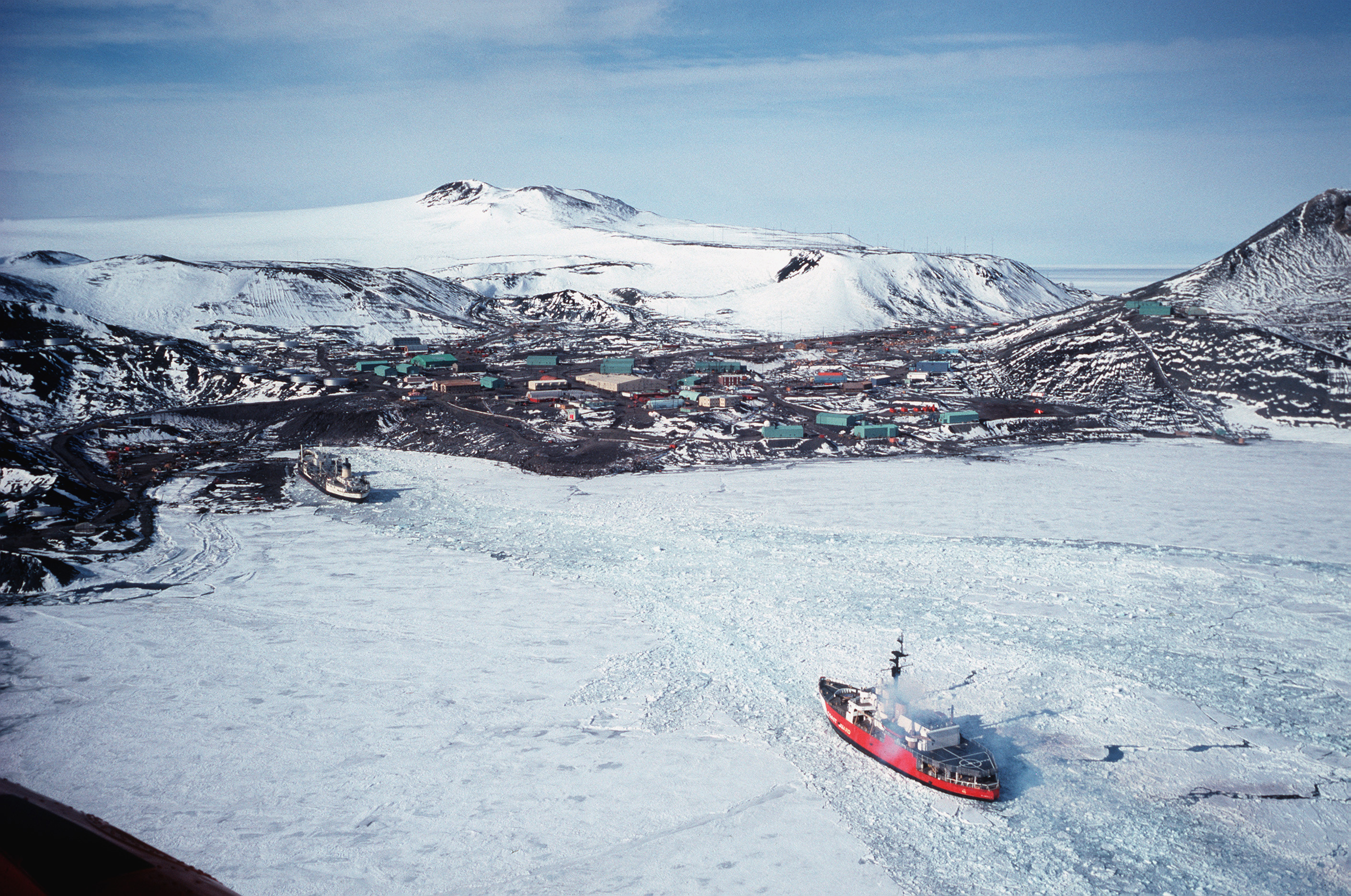
USCGC Glacier clearing a channel into McMurdo Sound in the early '80s

Prior to her transfer to the U.S. Coast Guard, Glacier had her smaller armament removed. In September 1967, Glacier departed her new homeport of Long Beach, California en route to the Chukchi Sea north of Cape Lisbourne, Alaska, to aid in the rescue of USCGC Northwind, beset in Arctic ice. The Canadian icebreaker CCGS John A. MacDonald had freed Northwind by the time of Glacier's arrival. Glacier departed Arctic waters to sail to Port Lyttelton, to start Operation Deep Freeze 1967–68. Due to the Northwind rescue trip, Glacier had crossed the Arctic Circle, International Dateline, Equator, and Antarctic Circle lines all within six weeks, attaining "Square Knot Sailor" status in that short time frame. Glacier and other USCG icebreakers opened up the McMurdo shipping lanes, then returned to Port Lyttelton. At that time an experimental navigational satellite (NavSat) system was installed in Glacier by the Applied Physics Lab of Johns Hopkins University, to allow precise positioning in the upcoming exploration in the Weddell Sea. Glacier transited the South Pacific Ocean to Punta Arenas, Chile and the Magellan Straits, then entered the Weddell Sea as lead vessel for the 1968 International Weddell Sea Oceanographic Expedition. Glacier occupied most of the scheduled oceanographic sampling stations in the Weddell Sea. Current meter arrays were set with the precise positioning of the NavSat system. These stations were to be revisited in three years, and the current meters sonic-released for data collection. The heavy fast ice in the Weddell Sea thwarted the scheduled retrieval of this array, until 1975.

Glacier visited the new Palmer Station on Anvers Island, after USCGC Iwsoe, to retrieve USN Seabees and transport them to Punta Arenas for eventual transit back to Davisville, Rhode Island. While departing Arthur Harbor at Palmer Station, Glacier was one-half mile (0.80 km) astern of USCGC Southwind. Southwind ran aground on an uncharted pinnacle (now called Southwind Rock), tearing out an 80-by-20-foot (24.4 by 6.1 m) section of hull. Glacier escorted the damaged Southwind across the Drake Passage to Puntas Arena, then up the West coast of South America to the Panama Canal. Glacier then departed Panama Canal for Long Beach.

In 1968, the 5-inch guns were also removed. Only the M2 Browning machine guns, M60 machine guns and small arms were retained for law enforcement purposes. During 1973, she and her helicopters were painted red for improved Arctic visibility.

In 1975, Glacier was trapped in ice in Antarctica for six days, finally breaking free and escaping into the waters of Antarctic Sound on 10 March 1975. "She backed and rammed her way to the open sea with the use of only one of her two propellers," said the Coast Guard. Two of the three blades on her other screw were sheared off by "steel hard ice" on Wednesday 5 March, while en route to assist an Argentine icebreaker, ARA General San Martín, which had engine trouble while on a supply mission to a south polar scientific base. The Argentine ship made its way to freedom on its own.

=== Decommissioning ===
Following 29 Antarctic and 10 Arctic deployments, Glacier was decommissioned in 1987. She went under the control of the U.S. Maritime Administration, located in the National Defense Reserve Fleet, Suisun Bay, on the Sacramento River, California. The Glacier Society saved Glacier from the scrapyard in 2000, and planned to convert the ship into a hospital or research vessel. However, on 16 February 2012 Glacier was sold for $146,726 to be broken up by ESCO Marine in Brownsville, Texas. Efforts to save the vessel from the breakers continued as the ship was taken to the former naval base at Mare Island, Vallejo, on 17 April 2012 for cleaning. Nevertheless, she was towed away to Brownsville, arriving on 19 June. A last-minute stay of execution was rejected, and MARAD ordered her scrapping to begin on 2 July 2012.

== Awards ==
- Navy Unit Commendation
- National Defense Service Medal
- Antarctic Service Medal

== See also ==
- USS Glacier's 39-foot ASB, an Arctic survey boat
