= Operation Windmill =

US Navy Antarctica expedition (1946–47)

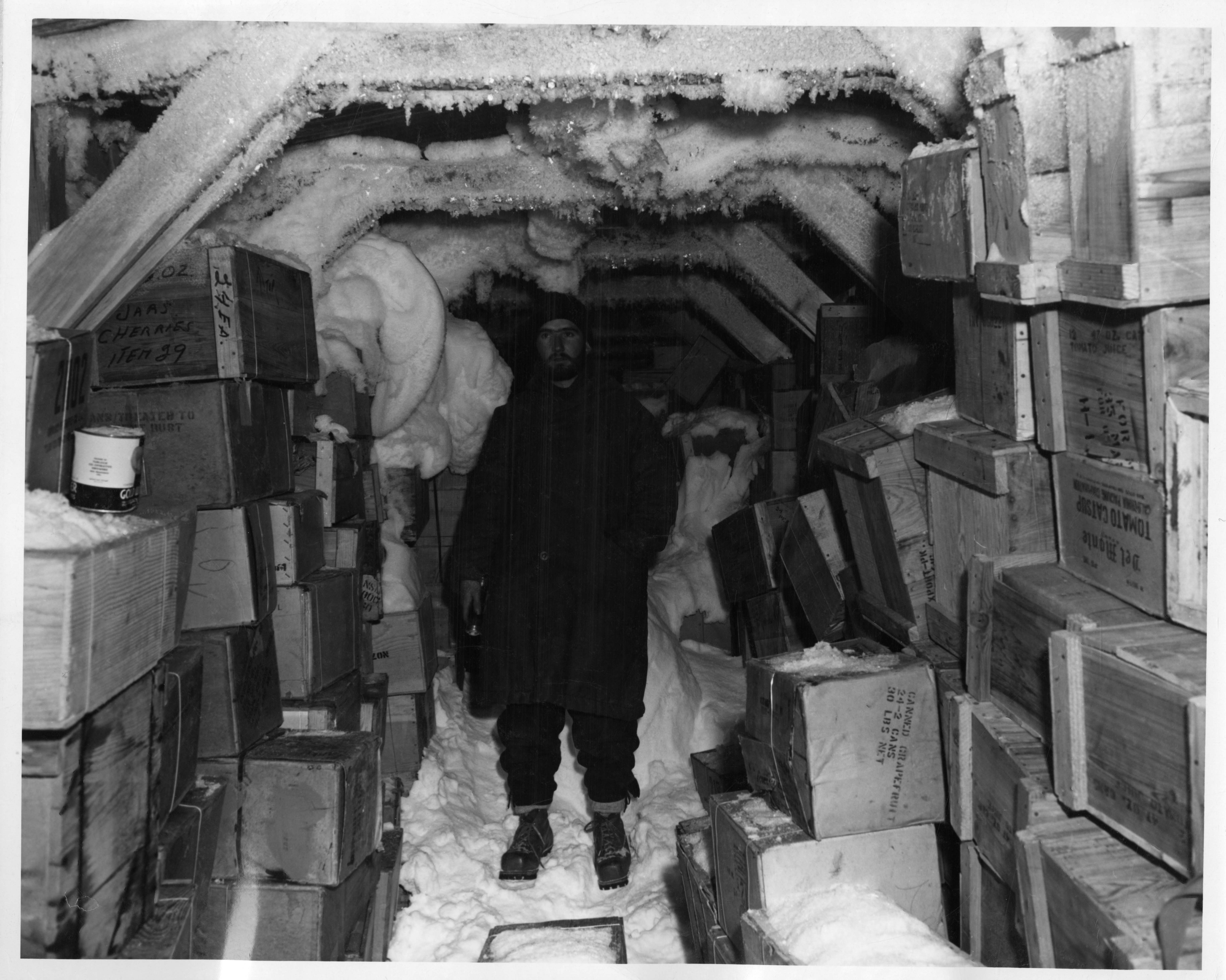
Supplies for the Windmill Expedition, 1947

Operation Windmill (OpWml) was the United States Navy's Second Antarctica Developments Project, an exploration and training mission to Antarctica in 1947–1948. This operation was a follow-up to the First Antarctica Development Project known as Operation Highjump (1946–1947). The expedition was commanded by Commander Gerald L. Ketchum, USN, and the flagship of Task Force 39 was the icebreaker USS Burton Island.

Missions during Operation Windmill varied including supply activities, helicopter reconnaissance of ice floes, scientific surveys, underwater demolition surveys, and convoy exercises. Malcolm Davis collected live animals, such as penguins and leopard seals, for zoological studies.

The icebreaker USS Edisto (AG-89) sailed on 1 November 1947 for the Panama Canal to rendezvous with the Burton Island for the expedition.

== See also ==
- List of Antarctic expeditions
- Military activity in the Antarctic
