= Mount Elkins =

Mountain in Enderby Land, Antarctica

- Map of Antarctica indicating the location of Mount Elkins

Highest point
- Elevation: 2,300 m (7,500 ft)
- Coordinates: 66°39′S 54°08′E

Geography
- Location: Enderby Land, East Antarctica
- Parent range: Napier Mountains

Geology
- Rock age: 2837 million years (Archean eon)
- Mountain type: Metamorphic

Climbing
- First ascent: 1960, by a survey party from Mawson Station which included Terence James Elkins, Sydney L. Kirkby, and Neville Joseph Collins
- Easiest route: basic snow/ice climb

Mount Elkins, also known as Jökelen (which means "The Glacier") is a dark, steep-sided mountain with three major peaks, the highest 2,300 meters (7,500 ft) above sea level, in the Napier Mountains of Enderby Land. Enderby Land is part of East Antarctica and is claimed by Australia as part of the Australian Antarctic Territory. The mountain was named after Terence James Elkins, an ionospheric physicist with the Australian National Antarctic Research Expeditions at Mawson Station in 1960.

== Location ==
Some notable geographic features in the general vicinity of Mount Elkins include Cape Batterbee (92 km to the north), the Young Nunataks (7.4 km to the south), Sørtoppen Nunatak (30 km to the east), the Newman Nunataks (26 km to the west), Mount McMaster (97 km to the west), and Mount Kjerringa (57 km to the northeast). The nearest permanently inhabited place is Mawson Station, an Australian research station to the southeast. Molodyozhnaya Station, a former Soviet research station that was mothballed in 1989, is located to the southwest of Mount Elkins.

Mount Elkins is the highest peak in the Napier Mountains, and also the highest peak in Enderby Land.

== Geology & orogeny ==
Much of the East Antarctic Shield was formed in the Precambrian period by a series of tectonothermal orogenic events. Napier orogeny formed the cratonic nucleus approximately 4 billion years ago. Mount Elkins is a classic example of Napier orogeny. Napier orogeny is characterized by high-grade metamorphism and plate tectonics. The orogenic events that resulted in the formation of the Napier Complex (including Mount Elkins) have been dated to the Archean Eon. Radiometrically dated to as old as 3.8 billion years, some of the zircons collected from the orthogneisses of the Napier Complex are among the oldest rock specimens found on Earth. Billions of years of erosion and tectonic deformation have exposed the metamorphic rock core of these ancient mountains.

The oldest crustal components found to date in the Napier Complex appear to be of igneous derivation. This rock appears to have been overprinted by an ultra-high temperature metamorphic event (UHT) that occurred near the Archean-Proterozoic boundary. Using a lutetium-hafnium (Lu-Hf) method to examine garnet, orthopyroxene, sapphirine, osumilite and rutile from this UHT granulite belt, Choi et al determined an isochron age of 2.4 billion years for this metamorphic event. Using SHRIMPU–Pb zircon dating methodology, Belyatsky et al determined the oldest tectonothermal event in the formation of the Napier Complex to have occurred approximately 2.8 billion years ago.

Preservation of the UHT mineral assemblage in the analyzed rock suggests rapid cooling, with closure likely to have occurred for the Lu-Hf system at post-peak UHT conditions near a closure temperature of 800 °C. UHT granulites appear to have evolved in a low Lu-Hf environment, probably formed when the rocks were first extracted from a mantle profoundly depleted in lithophile elements. The source materials for the magmas that formed the Napier Complex were extremely depleted relative to the chondritic uniform reservoir (CHUR). These results also suggest significant depletion of the early Archean mantle, in agreement with the early igneous differentiation of the Earth that the latest core formation models require.

== Ecology ==
Flora

To date, no flora has been observed at Mount Elkins.

Fauna

The following species have been sighted within 1.0 degrees of Mount Elkins:

Scientific name	Authority	Common name	Observations
Balaenoptera bonaerensis	Burmeister, 1867	Antarctic minke whale (also known as the dark-shoulder minke whale)	
Fulmarus glacialoides	Smith,1840	Southern fulmar	
Halecium banzare	Watson, 2008	Banzare hydroid	
Halecium brevithecum	Watson, 2008	Brevithecate hydroid	
Pagodroma nivea	Forster,1777	Snow petrel	
Pygoscelis adeliae	Hombron and Jacquinot,1841	Adélie penguin	
Thalassoica antarctica	Gmelin,1789	Antarctic petrel	

== Weather conditions ==
The Napier Mountains run northwest from Mount Elkins. To the east is a large valley formed by the Robert and Wilma Glaciers. To the northeast are the Seaton and Rippon Glaciers. All of these glaciers run into the King Edward Ice Shelf. Other notable terrain features in this area include the Beaver Glacier, located to the west of Mount King. Collectively, these terrain features significantly modify weather produced by synoptic scale systems. Dramatic changes can occur over short distances and in short time intervals.

== Nearby terrain features ==
Place names within 1.0 degrees of Mount Elkins (Latitude 66°40.0'S Longitude 54°09.0'E)

Name	Feature	Latitude	Longitude	Distance	Bearing
Aagaard Islands	Island	65°51.0'S	53°40.0'E	93.4 km	346°
Armstrong Peak	Peak	66°24.0'S	53°23.0'E	45.1 km	311°
Bandy Nunataks	Nunatak	66°55.0'S	53°36.0'E	36.8 km	221°
Bird Ridge	Ridge	66°47.0'S	55°04.0'E	42.3 km	108°
Bratthø	Peak	66°39.0'S	54°40.0'E	22.8 km	086°
Cape Batterbee	Cape	65°51.0'S	53°48.0'E	92.2 km	350°
Conradi Peak	Peak	66°08.0'S	54°35.0'E	62.4 km	018°
Doyle Point	Point	65°53.0'S	54°52.0'E	92.8 km	021°
Grimsley Peaks	Peak	66°34.0'S	53°40.0'E	24.1 km	297°
Knausen	Peak	66°22.0'S	53°13.0'E	53.1 km	308°
Mjåkollen	Peak	66°33.0'S	53°28.0'E	32.8 km	293°
Mount Bennett	Mountain	66°32.0'S	53°38.0'E	27.2 km	303°
Mount Breckinridge	Mountain	66°37.0'S	53°41.0'E	21.3 km	285°
Mount Bride	Mountain	66°26.0'S	53°57.0'E	27.4 km	341°
Mount Gate	Mountain	66°51.0'S	53°18.0'E	42.5 km	241°
Mount Griffiths	Mountain	66°28.0'S	54°01.0'E	23.0 km	345°
Mount Maines	Mountain	66°38.0'S	53°54.0'E	11.6 km	288°
Mount Pasco	Mountain	66°59.0'S	54°44.0'E	43.5 km	144°
Mount Stadler	Mountain	66°54.0'S	53°14.0'E	47.8 km	237°
Napier Mountains	Mountain	66°30.0'S	53°40.0'E	28.3 km	311°
Newman Nunataks	Nunatak	66°40.0'S	54°45.0'E	26.4 km	090°
Proclamation Island	Island	65°51.0'S	53°41.0'E	93.2 km	347°
Rabben	Peak	66°27.0'S	54°07.0'E	24.1 km	356°
Skarvet Nunatak	Nunatak	66°26.0'S	53°45.0'E	31.4 km	326°
Sørtoppen Nunatak	Nunatak	66°40.0'S	53°28.0'E	30.1 km	270°
Tippet Nunataks	Nunatak	66°44.0'S	53°15.0'E	40.3 km	259°
Vicars Island	Island	65°50.0'S	54°29.0'E	93.9 km	009°
Wheeler Rocks	Rock	66°17.0'S	55°08.0'E	61.0 km	046°
Wilkinson Peaks	Peak	66°37.0'S	54°15.0'E	7.1 km	038°
Young Nunataks	Nunatak	66°44.0'S	54°08.0'E	7.4 km	186°

== History ==
Mount Elkins was first mapped by Norwegian cartographers from aerial photographs taken by the Lars Christensen Expedition, 1936–37, and named at that time Jökelen (The Glacier). It was remapped by ANARE from aerial photographs taken from an ANARE aircraft in 1956. The Napier Mountains were first visited by an ANARE survey party from Mawson Station in 1960. The survey party was led by Syd Kirkby and included Terence James Elkins.

== Significance to mountaineers ==
The summit of Mount Elkins is higher than that of any mountain in Australia—including even Mount Kosciuszko (2,228 metres), which is one of the Seven Summits. Because of its remoteness it has not become a popular target for peak bagging.

== See also ==
- History of Antarctica
- List of Antarctic expeditions
- Research stations in Antarctica
