= Rippon Glacier =

Glacier in East Antarctica

- Location within Antarctica
- Type: mountain glacier
- Location: Kemp Land
- Coordinates: 66°44′S 56°29′E
- Thickness: unknown
- Terminus: Edward VIII Ice Shelf
- Status: unknown

Rippon Glacier is a small glacier located in Kemp Land, East Antarctica. It is close east of Seaton Glacier, flowing southward into Edward VIII Ice Shelf.

== Discovery and naming ==
Rippon Glacier was mapped from aerial photos taken by ANARE (Australian National Antarctic Research Expeditions) in 1956, and named for Sgt. Ralph Tudor Rippon, RAAF, airframe fitter at Mawson Station in 1959.

== Weather conditions ==
Just to the south of Rippon Glacier is a large valley formed by the Robert and Wilma Glaciers. These two glaciers, along with the Seaton and Rippon Glaciers, all flow into the King Edward Ice Shelf. To the west are the Napier Mountains, running northwest from Mount Elkins. Still further west are the Tula Mountains, beyond which the Beaver Glacier flows into Amundsen Bay. Collectively, these terrain features significantly modify weather produced by synoptic scale systems. Dramatic changes can occur over short distances and in short time intervals. One problem with some moist southeasterly airstreams is cloud formation northwest of Seaton and Rippon Glaciers that produces whiteout conditions looking inland of Rippon Depot.

== Flora ==
The following species have been sighted within 1.0 degrees of Rippon Glacier:

Scientific name	Authority	Common name	Observations
Bryum cf. caespiticium		Tufted thread-moss	
Bryum pseudotriquetrum		Marsh bryum	
Bryum urbanskyi			

== Fungi ==
- Buellia frigida
- Caloplaca athallina
- Caloplaca citrina
- Candelariella flava
- Japewia tornoensis
- Lecanora expectans
- Physcia caesia
- Physcia dubia
- Pseudephebe minuscula
- Rinodina olivaceobrunnea
- Xanthoria mawsonii

== Fauna ==
The following species have been sighted within 1.0 degrees of Rippon Glacier:

Scientific name	Authority	Common name	Observations
Aptenodytes forsteri	Gray, 1844	Emperor penguin	
Balaenoptera acutorostrata	Lacépède,1804	Minke whale	
Balaenoptera bonaerensis	Burmeister, 1867	Antarctic minke whale (also known as the 'dark-shoulder minke whale")	
Balaenoptera musculus	Linnaeus, 1758	Blue whale	
Daption capense	Linnaeus, 1758	Cape petrel	
Euphausia superba	Dana, 1852	Antarctic krill	
Fulmarus glacialoides	Smith,1840	Southern fulmar	
Lobodon carcinophaga	Hombron and Jacquinot,1842	Crabeater seal	
Oceanites oceanicus	Kuhl, 1820	Wilson's storm petrel	
Orcinus orca	Linnaeus, 1758	Killer whale	
Pagodroma nivea	Forster,1777	Snow petrel	
Puffinus spp.	Linnaeus, 1758	Shearwater	
Pygoscelis adeliae	Hombron and Jacquinot,1841	Adélie penguin	
Thalassoica antarctica	Gmelin,1789	Antarctic petrel	

== See also ==
- Enderby Land
- List of glaciers in the Antarctic
- Glaciology
