= Mount McMaster =

Outcrop in East Antarctica

- Map of Antarctica indicating location of Mount McMaster

Highest point
- Elevation: 861.5 metres (2,800 ft)
- Coordinates: 66°37′S 51°12′E

Geography
- Location: Enderby Land, East Antarctica

Geology
- Mountain type: Metamorphic

Climbing
- Easiest route: basic snow/ice climb

Mount McMaster is an outcrop 861.5 metres (2,800 ft) above sea level, located about 74 km (40 nmi) northeast of Mount Pardoe and 97 km (52 nmi) west of Mount Elkins in Enderby Land, East Antarctica. The outcrop was named after A. McMaster, a surveyor with the Australian National Antarctic Research Expeditions Enderby Land Survey Party in 1976 who established a survey station on the summit.

== See also ==
- List of mountains of Enderby Land
