= List of mountains of Enderby Land =

The mountains of Enderby Land are located in the region Enderby Land, East Antarctica, between 45° E and 55° E. Australia claims this region to be part of the Australian Antarctic Territory. The area are highly glaciated. The availability of reliable data for this region is limited, making the list incomplete and inaccurate. The highest peaks, including nunataks and ice domes, are listed below:

Name	Elevation (meters)	Location	Coordinates	GNIS ID	SCAR ID
Mount Elkins	2300	Napier Mountains	66°40′S 54°09′E	4431	4180
Sandercock Nunataks	2230		68°34′S 52°06′E	13242	12700
Mount Maines	2190	Napier Mountains	66°38′S 53°54′E	9300	8873
Knuckey Peaks	2125		67°54′S 53°32′E	8090	7676
Mount Breckinridge	2050	Napier Mountains	66°37′S 53°41′E	1884	1808

== See also ==
- Geology of Enderby Land
- Mount Boda
