= Mount Kjerringa =

Mountain in Enderby Land, Antarctica

- Map of Antarctica indicating location of Mount Kjerringa

Highest point
- Elevation: 1,220 metres (4,000 ft)
- Coordinates: 66°29′S 55°11′E

Geography
- Location: Enderby Land, East Antarctica

Geology
- Rock age: 2837 million years (Archaean eon)
- Mountain type: Metamorphic

Climbing
- Easiest route: basic snow/ice climb

Mount Kjerringa is an isolated peak, 1,220 metres (4,000 ft) above sea level, situated roughly 8 nmi (15 km) north of the Aker Peaks, 26 nmi (48 km) west of Magnet Bay, and 57 km (31 nmi) northeast of Mount Elkins in Enderby Land, East Antarctica.

== Discovery and naming ==
Mount Kjerringa was mapped by Norwegian cartographers from aerial photographs taken by the Lars Christensen Expedition, 1936–37, and called Kjerringa (The Old Woman).

== See also ==
- List of mountains of Enderby Land
