= Watson Ridge =

Watson Ridge (67°0′S 55°46′E) is a partially snow-covered rock ridge standing 9 nautical miles (17 km) southeast of Mount Storegutt, Enderby Land. Mapped from ANARE (Australian National Antarctic Research Expeditions) surveys and air photos, 1954–66. Named by Antarctic Names Committee of Australia (ANCA) for R.A. Watson, weather observer at Mawson Station, 1963.
