= Knuckey Peaks =

Mountains in Antarctica

The Knuckey Peaks (67°54′S 53°32′E) are a group of isolated peaks 30 nautical miles (60 km) southeast of the McLeod Nunataks and 15 nautical miles (30 km) west of the Doggers Nunataks in Enderby Land, Antarctica. The peaks were discovered and positioned in December 1958 by an Australian National Antarctic Research Expeditions dog-sledge party, and were named by the Antarctic Names Committee of Australia for Graham A. Knuckey, a surveyor at Mawson Station in 1958 and a member of the dog-sledge party.
