= Mount Maines =

Mountain in Enderby Land, Antarctica

- Map of Antarctica indicating location of Mount Maines

Highest point
- Elevation: 2,190 m (7,190 ft)
- Coordinates: 66°39′S 53°54′E

Geography
- Location: Enderby Land, East Antarctica
- Parent range: Napier Mountains

Geology
- Rock age: 2837 million years (Archaean eon)
- Mountain type: Metamorphic

Climbing
- Easiest route: basic snow/ice climb

Mount Maines, also known as Stornuten, is a mountain, 2,190 metres (7,190 ft), standing roughly 13 kilometres (8.1 mi) SE of Stor Hånakken Mountain and 10 kilometres (6.2 mi) W of Mount Elkins in the Napier Mountains, Enderby Land.

== Discovery and naming ==
Mount Maines was mapped by Norwegian cartographers from air photos taken by the Lars Christensen Expedition, 1936–37, and named Stornuten (the big peak). Rephotographed by ANARE in 1956 and renamed by ANCA for R.L. Maines, cook at Wilkes Station in 1961.

== See also ==
- List of mountains of Enderby Land
