= Napier Mountains =

Mountain range in East Antarctica

Highest point
- Peak: Mount Elkins
- Elevation: 2,300 m (7,500 ft)
- Coordinates: 66°40′S 54°09′E

Geography
- Region(s): Enderby Land, East Antarctica
- Range coordinates: 66°30′S 53°40′E

The Napier Mountains are a group of close set peaks, the highest being Mount Elkins, at about 2,300 meters above sea level. This mountain range is located in Enderby Land, in the claimed Australian Antarctic Territory, East Antarctica.

== Location ==
The Napier Mountains are roughly four degrees west of Cape Boothby, Edward VIII Bay and Edward VIII Ice Shelf, and 3.5 degrees east of Amundsen Bay. The Napier Mountains are centered about 64 km south of Cape Batterbee in Enderby Land, East Antarctica. It extends about 64 km in a northwest–southeast direction from Mount Codrington and includes Mount Kjerringa and the Young Nunataks.

== Discovery ==
The Napier Mountains were discovered in January 1930 by the British Australian New Zealand Antarctic Research Expedition under explorer Douglas Mawson. They were named by Mawson after John Mellis Napier, a judge of the Supreme Court of South Australia. The mountain range was first visited by an Australian National Antarctic Research Expeditions party in 1960. Members of this party included Syd Kirkby and Terence James Elkins.

== Features ==
Geographic features of the Napier Mountains include:

- Fitzgerald Nunataks
- Grimsley Peaks
- Mount Breckinridge
- Mount Codrington
- Mount Elkins
- Mount Griffiths
- Mount Maines
- Mount Rabben
- Skorefjell
- Stor Hånakken Mountain
- Wilkinson Peaks
- Young Nunataks

== Geology and orogeny ==
The Napier complex is among the most ancient terrestrial terranes on Earth. Its evolution is characterized by high-grade metamorphism and several strong deformations. At least four distinct tectonothermal events occurred in the Archaean eon:

1. 3.8 billion years ago (Ga): occurrence of initial felsic igneous activity over a long period of time
2. 3.0 Ga: emplacement of charnockite at Proclamation Island
3. 2.8 Ga: occurrence of a very-high grade discrete tectonothermal event (an ultra-high temperature metamorphic event)
4. 2.5 Ga: occurrence of a subsequent, protracted high-grade tectonothermal event

Much of the East Antarctic craton was formed in the Precambrian by a series of tectonothermal orogenic events. Napier orogeny formed the cratonic nucleus approximately 4 Ga. Mount Elkins is a classic example of Napier orogeny. Napier orogeny is characterized by high-grade metamorphism and plate tectonics. The orogenic events which resulted in the formation of the Napier complex (including Mount Elkins) have been dated to the Archean. Radiometrically dated to as old as 3.8 billion years, some of the zircons collected from the orthogneisses of Mount Sones are among the oldest rock specimens found on Earth. Billions of years of erosion and tectonic deformation have exposed the metamorphic rock core of these ancient mountains.

The oldest crustal components found to date in the Napier complex appear to be of igneous derivation. This rock appears to have been overprinted by an ultra-high temperature metamorphic event (UHT) that occurred near the Archean-Proterozoic boundary. Using a lutetium-hafnium (Lu-Hf) method to examine garnet, orthopyroxene, sapphirine, osumilite and rutile from this UHT granulite belt, Choi et al determined an isochron age of 2.4 billion years for this metamorphic event. Using SHRIMPU–Pb zircon dating methodology, Belyatsky et al determined the oldest tectonothermal event in the formation of the Napier Complex to have occurred approximately 2.8 Ga.

Preservation of the UHT mineral assemblage in the analyzed rock suggests rapid cooling, with closure likely to have occurred for the Lu-Hf system at post-peak UHT conditions near a closure temperature of 800 °C. UHT granulites appear to have evolved in a low Lu-Hf environment, probably formed when the rocks were first extracted from a mantle profoundly depleted in lithophile elements. The source materials for the magmas that formed the Napier Complex were extremely depleted relative to the chondritic uniform reservoir. These results also suggest significant depletion of the early Archean mantle, in agreement with the early igneous differentiation of the Earth that the latest core formation models require.
