= Turbulence Bluffs =

Turbulence Bluffs (67°9′S 56°29′E) is an area located along the east side of Robert Glacier, 18.5 miles (29.8 km) northeast of Rayner Peak in Enderby Land, Antarctica. It consists of three high bluffs with vertical faces on the northwest, that merge with an ice sheet on the southeast. The area was mapped through Australian National Antarctic Research Expeditions (ANARE) surveys and air photos between 1954 and 1966. It received its name due to severe turbulence encountered while attempting a helicopter landing in 1965.
