= Wheeler Bay =

Body of water in Enderby Land, Antarctica

Wheeler Bay (66°18′S 56°6′E) is a bay at the northwest side of Edward VIII Plateau in Antarctica. It is 5.6 kilometres (3 nmi) wide, indenting the coast 3.7 kilometres (2 nmi) northwest of Magnet Bay

The Bay was originally mapped by Norwegian cartographers from aerial photos taken by the Lars Christensen Expedition (1936–37). They named it Brorvika ("brother bay") and the rocks at its entrance Brodrene ("the brothers"). The area was remapped in 1956–57 by ANARE (Australian National Antarctic Research Expeditions) which renamed the bay and the rocks for G.T. Wheeler, weather observer at Mawson Station in 1957. The name Brodrene Rocks has been approved for the associated rocks.
