= Terence James Elkins =

American physicist (1936–2023)

- Elkins in 1976
- Born: 8 March 1936; Melbourne, Australia
- Died: 27 November 2023 (aged 87); Williamsburg, Virginia, US
- Citizenship: United States
- Education: University of Melbourne; Boston University
- Known for: First ascent of Mount Elkins
- Awards: Harold Brown Award, 1979
- Scientific career
- Fields: Physics; Astronomy
- Workplaces: Air Force Cambridge Research Laboratory; Rome Air Development Center; Mitre Corporation

Terence James Elkins (8 March 1936 – 23 November 2023) was an Australian-born American physicist. In 1960, he participated in an expedition from Mawson Station which conducted the first geological surveys of the Napier Mountains in Enderby Land, East Antarctica. The highest of this group of mountains, Mount Elkins, was subsequently named after him. In 1979, he received the Harold Brown Award, the United States Air Force's highest honour for research and development, for research he conducted that contributed to the development of the AN/FPS-115, AN/FPS-117 and AN/FPS-118 over-the-horizon backscatter (OTH-B) air defence radar system. Designed to replace the ageing Ballistic Missile Early Warning System, these systems are among the most powerful early-warning radar systems ever developed.

== Education ==
Elkins earned his Bachelor of Electrical Engineering degree from the University of Melbourne in 1957. He earned his master's degree in Physics and Astronomy from Boston University in 1967. He earned his Ph.D. from the same institution in 1970, publishing a thesis entitled Studies of Ionospheric Irregularity Using Radio Astronomical Techniques.

== Mawson Station (1960–1961) ==
After completion of his bachelor's degree, Elkins joined the ANARE team that wintered over at Mawson Station in Australian Antarctic Territory in 1960. The wintering party comprised 33 expeditioners including 12 members of the Antarctic Flight RAAF; the Officer-in-Charge was Hendrick Geysen. That year, Elkins was part of a 400 km sledging field party that travelled from Mawson Station to the Napier Mountains in Enderby Land. The men of this expedition, led by fellow Antarctic explorer Syd Kirkby, conducted the first geological surveys of that area of the continent. The highest of this small group of mountains, Mount Elkins, was subsequently named after Dr. Elkins. Other survey teams that year visited the Framnes Mountains, conducted geological and survey work in the Prince Charles Mountains, and visited the Emperor penguin colonies at Taylor Glacier and Fold Island.

ANARE has since been renamed the Australian Antarctic Program, managed by the Australian Antarctic Division, itself a division of the Department of the Environment, Water, Heritage and the Arts.

== Emigration to the United States and early career ==
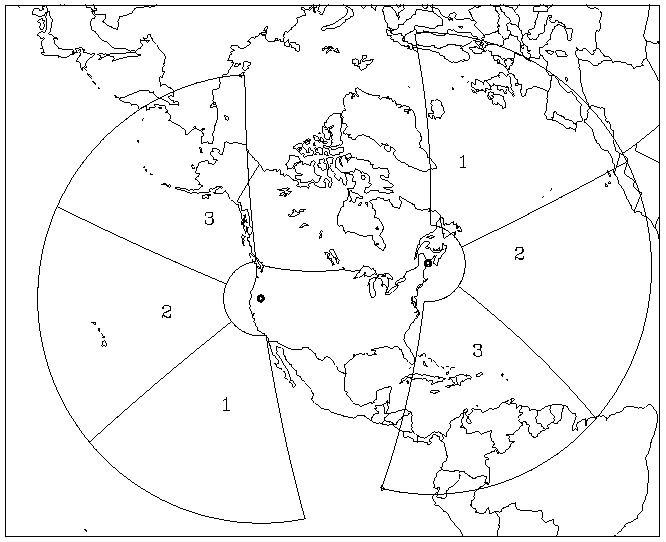
coverage of ECRS and WCRS AN/FPS-118 over-the-horizon backscatter (OTH-B) radar systems

Elkins emigrated from his native Australia to the United States in 1963, at the height of the Space Race, after being recruited by the scientific research program of the United States Air Force. Beginning in the early 1960s, he conducted research focused mainly on the upper atmosphere and ionosphere, and improvements to ground, airborne, and space-based ISTAR systems, including over-the-horizon radar systems.

In addition to his work at Hanscom Air Force Base, much of his early research was also conducted at Sagamore Hill Radio Observatory, a ground-based solar observatory located in Hamilton, Massachusetts. Sagamore Hill Solar Radio Observatory is a functional component of the Radio Solar Telescope Network (RSTN).

In 1980, he developed and published an auroral echo-scattering model to predict the obscuration of targets when the radar transmission path is through the polar regions of Earth.

== Development of the AN/FPS-118 air defence radar system ==
Under the universal classification system for electronic radar and tracking systems, the letters “AN” (for Army-Navy) are placed ahead of a three-letter code. The first letter of the three-letter code denotes the type of platform hosting the electronic device, where A=Aircraft; F=Fixed (land-based); S=Ship-mounted; T=Ground transportable. The second letter indicates the type of device, where P=Radar (pulsed); Q=Sonar; R=Radio. The third letter indicates the function of the radar system device, where G=Fire control; R=Receiving; S=Search; T=Transmitting. Thus, the AN/FPS-115 represents the 115th design of an Army-Navy “Fixed, Radar, Search” electronic device.

Elkins was part of a team of Rome Air Development Center (RADC) engineers that developed and constructed components for frequency modulation/continuous wave (FM/CW) radars capable of detecting and tracking objects at over-the-horizon ranges. A prototype radar was installed and evaluated on 15 September 1970. The system incorporated a Beverage array receiving antenna located at Columbia Falls Air Force Station, a high-power transmitter array located at Moscow Air Force Station, and an operations center located at Bangor International Airport. This prototype became operational on 30 October of that year. Experimental transmissions from the Maine site covered a 60° sector from 16.5° to 76.5° azimuth and from 900 to 3,300 km in range from the radar.

Based on the success of these early experiments, the United States Department of Defense proposed to deploy a fully operational radar system. This radar system, covering 180° in azimuth, was built at the same locations in Maine. Initial testing was conducted from June 1980 to June 1981. GE Aerospace (now Lockheed Martin Ocean, Radar and Sensor Systems) received a contract in mid-1982 for full-scale development of the AN/FPS-118 program.

The operational system consisted of multiple OTH-B radars functioning as an early warning system to detect incoming enemy bombers, ICBMs, and cruise missiles. The system, as initially envisioned, was to consist of four sectors:

- East Coast Sector (ECRS): facing east, including a group of three transmitters at Moscow Air Force Station, a group of three receivers at Columbia Falls Air Force Station, also in Maine, and an operations center located at Bangor International Airport.
- West Coast Sector (WCRS): facing west, including a group of three transmitters at Christmas Valley, Oregon, a group of three receivers at Tule Lake, near Alturas, California, and an operations center at Mountain Home Air Force Base in Idaho.
- North Sector (in Alaska): facing north, cancelled prior to completion
- Central Sector (in Texas): facing south

Only months after the system became fully operational, the Cold War came to an end. The military requirement for the OTH-B radar network was therefore greatly diminished. The mission of the ECRS radar system was redirected to counter-narcotics surveillance and drug interdiction, and the ECRS operated in this capacity for several years. The three OTH radars of the WCRS were mothballed, and the incomplete North Sector in Alaska was cancelled.

The Air Force currently maintains the six East Coast and West Coast OTH-B radars in a state called warm storage, which preserves the physical and electrical integrity of the system and permits recall, should a need arise. It would require at least 24 months to bring these first-generation OTH-B radars into operational status.

== Later career ==
Dr. Elkins spent much of his career at Hanscom Air Force Base in Bedford, Massachusetts, where he conducted research at several of the tenant commands, including the Air Force Cambridge Research Laboratories (AFCRL) and the Air Force Geophysics Laboratory. He also conducted research at the Rome Air Development Center, located at Griffiss Air Force Base in Rome, New York. The Geophysics Laboratory is now known as the Phillips Laboratory, while the Rome Air Development Center is now known as the Rome Laboratory. Both research laboratories operate under the Air Force Materiel Command (AFMC).

Throughout a career that spanned nearly five decades, Dr. Elkins' research focused on development and deployment of electronic systems for the gathering and dissemination of military intelligence, including Command, Control, Communications, and Intelligence (C3I), satellite imagery, electronic warfare, and systems for remote sensing of the environment from surface, airborne, space and undersea based platforms.

After more than 20 years in research and development for the United States Air Force, he joined the Mitre Corporation in McLean, Virginia, where he continued his research for another 25 years. The majority of his work at MITRE was for the C3I Federally Funded Research and Development Center (FFRDC) supporting the United States Department of Defense.

== Awards and recognition ==
Elkins was the recipient of the 1979 Harold Brown Award. The Harold Brown Award is the Air Force's highest honour for research and development.

== Publications ==
Elkins has published many scientific journal articles, including:

- Elkins, Terence J.; Egeland, Alv (1 March 1963). "Ionospheric effects associated with nuclear weapon tests, July–December 1962: a scientific report". Kiruna Geophysical Observatory. 63: 2.
- Elkins, Terence J. (October 1966). "Influence of solar protons on high-latitude ionospheric disturbance". Radio Science. 1 (10): 1195–1200. Bibcode:1966RaSc....1.1195E. doi:10.1002/rds19661101195.
- Aarons, Jules; Allen, Richard S.; Elkins, Terence J. (1 June 1967). "Frequency dependence of radio star scintillations". Journal of Geophysical Research. 72 (11): 2891–2902. Bibcode:1967JGR....72.2891A. doi:10.1029/JZ072i011p02891.
- Aarons, Jules; Elkins, Terence J.; Papagiannis, Michael D. (1968). Studies of irregular atmospheric refraction using stationary satellites. Space Research VIII. Amsterdam: North Holland Publishing Company. pp. 405–412.
- Horizon studies of ATS-1 beacon signals (Technical report). ATS Monthly Technical Data Report. 1 March 1968.
- Elkins, Terence J.; Papagiannis, Michael D. (1 August 1969). "Measurement and interpretation of power spectrums of ionospheric scintillation at a sub-auroral location". Journal of Geophysical Research. 74 (16): 4105–4115. Bibcode:1969JGR....74.4105E. doi:10.1029/JA074i016p04105.
- Elkins, Terence J.; Slack, F.F. (1 March 1969). "Observations of travelling ionospheric disturbances using stationary satellites". Journal of Atmospheric and Terrestrial Physics. 31 (3): 421–439. Bibcode:1969JATP...31..421E. doi:10.1016/0021-9169(69)90067-1.
- Papagiannis, Michael D.; Elkins, Terence J. (1 March 1970). "Dispersive motions of ionospheric irregularities". Journal of Atmospheric and Terrestrial Physics. 32 (3): 383–395. Bibcode:1970JATP...32..383P. doi:10.1016/0021-9169(70)90010-3.
- D.L. Evans; P.M. Kalaghan; J. Short; W. Swider; W. Pfister; J. Buchau; G.J. Gassmann; T.J. Elkins; R.A. Wagner; C.P. Pike (5 February 1971). Ionospheric and tropospheric limitations to radar accuracy (Technical report). Air Force Surveys in Geophysics. L.G. Hanscom Field, Bedford, Massachusetts: Air Force Cambridge Research Laboratories, Air Force Systems Command, United States Air Force. pp. 1–102. 231.
- Elkins, Terence J. (18 July 1972). A model of auroral substorm absorption (AFCRL-TR-72-0413) (PDF) (Technical report). Environmental Research Papers. L.G. Hanscom Field, Bedford, Massachusetts: Air Force Cambridge Research Laboratories, Air Force Systems Command, United States Air Force. pp. 1–23. 404.
- Elkins, Terence J.; Rush, Charles M. (23 May 1973). "A statistical predictive model of the polar ionosphere". In Elkins, Terence J. (ed.). An empirical model of the polar ionosphere (AFCRL-TR-73-0331) (PDF) (Technical report). Air Force Surveys in Geophysics. L.G. Hanscom Field, Bedford, Massachusetts: Air Force Cambridge Research Laboratories, Air Force Systems Command, United States Air Force. pp. 1–153. 267.
- Elkins, Terence J. (16 September 1974). An analysis of polar cap backscatter radar data (AFCRL-TR-74-0457) (PDF) (Technical report). Air Force Surveys in Geophysics. Vol. 74. L.G. Hanscom Field, Bedford, Massachusetts: Air Force Cambridge Research Laboratories, Air Force Systems Command, United States Air Force. pp. 1–21. 457.
- Rush, Charles M.; Elkins, Terence J. (August 1975). "An assessment of the magnitude of the F-region absorption on HF radio waves using realistic electron density and collision frequency models". ITU Telecommunication Journal. 42: 476–488. Bibcode:1975ITUTJ..42..476R.
- Elkins, Terence J.; Gibbs, Joseph (1 May 1977). Coordinate conversion technique for OTH backscatter radar (RADC-TR-77-183) (PDF) (Technical report). Griffiss Air Force Base, Rome, New York: Rome Air Development Center, Air Force Systems Command, United States Air Force. pp. 1–111.
- Elkins, Terence J. (1979). "Recent advances in HF propagation simulation". In Coyne, Vincent J. (ed.). Special topics in HF propagation (PDF). Neuilly-sur-Seine, France: Advisory Group for Aerospace Research and Development. pp. 21.1 – 21.5. ISBN 92-835-0253-1.
- Elkins, Terence J. (1 March 1980). A model for high-frequency radar auroral clutter (RADC-TR-80-122) (PDF) (Technical report). Griffiss Air Force Base, Rome, New York: Rome Air Development Center, Air Force Systems Command, United States Air Force. pp. 1–112.
- Elkins, Terence J.; Toman, Kurt; Sales, Gary S. (1 December 1980). Theoretical and experimental studies of HF ducted propagation (RADC-TR-80-360) (Technical report). Griffiss Air Force Base, Rome, New York: Rome Air Development Center, Air Force Systems Command, United States Air Force. pp. 1–64. 81.
- Providakes, Jason; Elkins, Terence J.; Godwin, R.B.; Kelley, M.C. (1 December 1991). An OTH radar clutter simulation (PDF) (Technical report). ESD/RADC OTH Radar Symposium. Bedford, Massachusetts: The MITRE Corporation.
- Elkins, Terence J.; Providakes, Jason (1 December 1991). HFRAD Hindcast: An OTH-B Radar and Model Comparison Study (PDF) (Technical report). NASA STI/Recon Technical Report N. Bedford, Massachusetts: The MITRE Corporation. 92.
- Earp, Samuel L.; Elkins, Terence J.; Conrath, Bartley C. (20 June 1995). "Detection of random minefields in clutter". In Dubey, Abinash C.; Cindrich, Ivan; Ralston, James M.; Rigano, Kelly A. (eds.). Detection Technologies for Mines and Minelike Targets. Proceedings of the SPIE. Vol. 2496. pp. 543–555. doi:10.1117/12.211350. S2CID 61021811.
