= Cape Boothby =

Headland in East Antarctica

Coordinates: 66°34′S 57°16′E

Cape Boothby is a rounded cape in East Antarctica along the east side of the coastal projection of Edward VIII Plateau. It is four miles (6.4 km) north of Kloa Point, just north of Edward VIII Bay. It was discovered on 28 February 1936 by Discovery Investigations personnel on the RRS William Scoresby, and named for the captain of the vessel, Lieutenant Commander C.R.U. Boothby, Royal Naval Reserve.
