= Austnes Peninsula =

Peninsula in Antarctica

Austnes Peninsula (66°42′S 57°17′E) is a short, broad, ice-covered peninsula forming the southeast end of Edward VIII Plateau and the north side of the entrance to Edward VIII Bay; Cape Gotley marks the extremity of this peninsula. It was mapped by Norwegian cartographers from aerial photographs taken by the Lars Christensen Expedition in January–February 1937, and named "Austnes" ("east promontory") by them because of its eastward projection.
