= Grimsley =

Grimsley may refer to:

- Grimsley (surname)
- Grimsley, Tennessee, unincorporated community
- Grimsley Peaks, mountains of Antarctica
- Mount Grimsley, mountain of Antarctica
- Grimsley (Pokémon), character in the Pokémon media franchise
- Grimsley High School, high school in Greensboro, North Carolina
