= Hump Island =

Island in Antarctica

- Location within Antarctica

Geography
- Location: Antarctica
- Coordinates: 67°36′S 62°53′E

Administration
- Administered under the Antarctic Treaty System

Demographics
- Population: Uninhabited

Hump Island is an island just east of the East Arm of Horseshoe Harbour in Holme Bay, Mac. Robertson Land, Antarctica. It was mapped by Norwegian cartographers from air photos taken by the Lars Christensen Expedition, 1936–37, rephotographed by U.S. Navy Operation Highjump, 1946–47, and so named by the Australian National Antarctic Research Expeditions because of its humped appearance from ground level.

== See also ==
- List of Antarctic and sub-Antarctic islands
