= Stack Bay =

Bay in Antarctica

Stack Bay (67°3′S 58°4′E) is a small bay between West Stack and the mouth of Hoseason Glacier in Enderby Land. Mapped by Norwegian cartographers from air photos taken by the Lars Christensen Expedition (1936–37) and called "Skotvika" because of the proximity to West Stack, named by personnel of RRS William Scoresby in 1936. The name for the bay has been approved in a translated form to agree with West Stack.
