= Martin Island =

Martin Island or similar may refer to:

- Martin Island (Antarctica)
- Martin Islet, New South Wales
- Martin Islands, part of the Canadian Arctic Archipelago
- Martin Islands (Antarctica)

== See also ==
- Byam Martin Island
- Saint Martin Island (disambiguation)
