= Skorefjell =

Mountain in Antarctica

Skorefjell (66°27′S 53°57′E) is a mountain, 1,520 m, standing 17 kilometres (9 nmi) northeast of Stor Hanakken Mountain in the Napier Mountains in Enderby Land. It was mapped by Norwegian cartographers from air photos taken by the Lars Christensen Expedition of 1936–37 and was named Skorefjell.
