= Fitzgerald Nunataks =

Nunataks in Enderby Land, Antarctica

The Fitzgerald Nunataks (66°15′S 52°49′E) are three isolated nunataks 2 nautical miles (4 km) north of Mount Codrington, at the northwest end of the Napier Mountains in Enderby Land, Antarctica. They were mapped by Norwegian cartographers from air photos taken by the Lars Christensen Expedition, 1936–37, and named "Veslenutane" (the little peaks). They were photographed from Australian National Antarctic Research Expeditions aircraft in 1956 and renamed by the Antarctic Names Committee of Australia for Brigadier L. Fitzgerald, Director of Survey in the Australian Army, 1942–60.
