= Doggers Nunataks =

Group of peaks in Antarctica

The Doggers Nunataks (67°46′S 54°51′E) are a group of peaks 30 nautical miles (60 km) southwest of Rayner Peak, to the southwest of Edward VIII Bay. They were photographed in October 1956 by Australian National Antarctic Research Expeditions (ANARE) aircraft and surveyed in December 1958 by G.A. Knuckey during a dog-sledge journey from Amundsen Bay to Mawson Station. The group was named by the Antarctic Names Committee of Australia for the members of the 1958 ANARE dog sledging party who were always referred to as the "Doggers."
