= Mount Rabben =

Mountain in Enderby Land, Antarctica

Mount Rabben (66°27′S 54°7′E) is a mountain, 1,540 m, standing 2 nautical miles (3.7 km) northeast of Mount Griffiths in the Napier Mountains, Enderby Land. It was mapped by Norwegian cartographers from air photos taken by the Lars Christensen Expedition of 1936–37 and was named Rabben (the small elongated elevation).
