= Sørtoppen Nunatak =

Nunatak in Enderby Land, Antarctica

Coordinates: 66°40′S 53°28′E

Sørtoppen Nunatak is a nunatak about 1900 m above sea level, about 11.1 km south-west of Mount Breckinridge in Enderby Land. Mapped from air photographs taken by the Lars Christensen Expedition (1936–37) and called Sørtoppen (The South Peak) by Norwegian cartographers.

Some notable geographic features in the general vicinity of Sørtoppen Nunatak include Mount Elkins, 30 km to the west.
