= Wilkinson Peaks =

Mountains in Antarctica

Coordinates: 66°37′S 54°15′E

- Map of Antarctica indicating Australian claim

Naming
- Native name: Langnabbane (Bokmål)

Geography
- Continent: Antarctica
- Region(s): Enderby Land, East Antarctica
- Parent range: Napier Mountains

The Wilkinson Peaks, also known as Langnabbane, is a group of peaks in the Napier Mountains standing 8 kilometres (5.0 mi) southeast of Mount Griffiths and 8 kilometres (5.0 mi) northeast of Mount Elkins in Enderby Land.

== Discovery and naming ==
The Wilkinson Peaks were mapped by Norwegian cartographers from aerial photos taken by the Lars Christensen Expedition of 1936–37 and were called Langnabbane (the long peaks). They were visited in 1961 by an ANARE (Australian National Antarctic Research Expeditions) sledge party and renamed by the Antarctic Names Committee of Australia (ANCA) for Brian Geoffrey Wilkinson, the assistant diesel mechanic at Mawson Station in 1961.
