= Jennings Bluff =

Antarctic bluff

Jennings Bluff (66°42′S 55°29′E) is a dark, flat-topped outcrop in the Nicholas Range of Antarctica, 10 nautical miles (19 km) north of Mount Storegutt. It rises about 100 metres (330 ft) above the general ice level and has a steep eastern side, backing to an ice scarp in the west. The bluff was discovered by the British Australian New Zealand Antarctic Research Expedition, 1929–31, under Mawson. It was mapped by Norwegian cartographers from aerial photos taken by the Lars Christensen Expedition, 1936–37, and called Brattstabben (the Steep Stump). It was photographed from Australian National Antarctic Research Expeditions aircraft in 1956 and remapped, and was renamed by the Antarctic Names Committee of Australia in 1961 for Noel Durrent Jennings, an assistant diesel mechanic at Mawson Station in 1960.
