= Doyle Point =

Headland in Enderby Land, Antarctica

Doyle Point (65°53′S 54°52′E) is a point between Cape Batterbee and Cape Borley on the coast of Enderby Land. It was discovered on 12 January 1930 by the British Australian New Zealand Antarctic Research Expedition under Mawson, who named it for Stuart Doyle, who assisted the expedition photographer with the film record.
