= Newman Nunataks =

Nunataks in Enderby Land, Antarctica

Coordinates: 66°40′S 54°45′E

Newman Nunataks are a group of nunataks about 19 kilometres (10 nmi) west of Aker Peaks, and 26 km west of Mount Elkins, in Enderby Land, Antarctica. Their position was plotted from air photographs taken by ANARE in 1956 and 1960. They were named after A.J. Newman, senior diesel mechanic at Mawson Station in 1961.

== See also ==
- History of Antarctica
- List of Antarctic expeditions
- Research stations in Antarctica
