= Armstrong Peak =

Mountain in Antarctica

- Map of Antarctica indicating location of Armstrong Peak

Highest point
- Elevation: 1,470 m (4,820 ft)
- Coordinates: 66°24′S 53°23′E

Geography
- Location: Enderby Land, East Antarctica

Armstrong Peak is a peak, 1,470 metres (4,820 ft) high, standing 15 nautical miles (28 km) southeast of Mount Codrington in Enderby Land of East Antarctica.

== Discovery and naming ==
Armstrong Peak was mapped by Norwegian cartographers from aerial photographs taken by the Lars Christensen Expedition, 1936–37, and named "Austnuten" (the east peak). The peak was re-photographed by Australian National Antarctic Research Expeditions (ANARE) in 1956. An astrofix was obtained nearby in December 1959 by J.C. Armstrong, ANARE surveyor at Mawson Station, for whom the feature was renamed by the Antarctic Names Committee of Australia in 1960.
