= Kloa Point =

Headland of Antarctica

Coordinates: 66°38′S 57°19′E

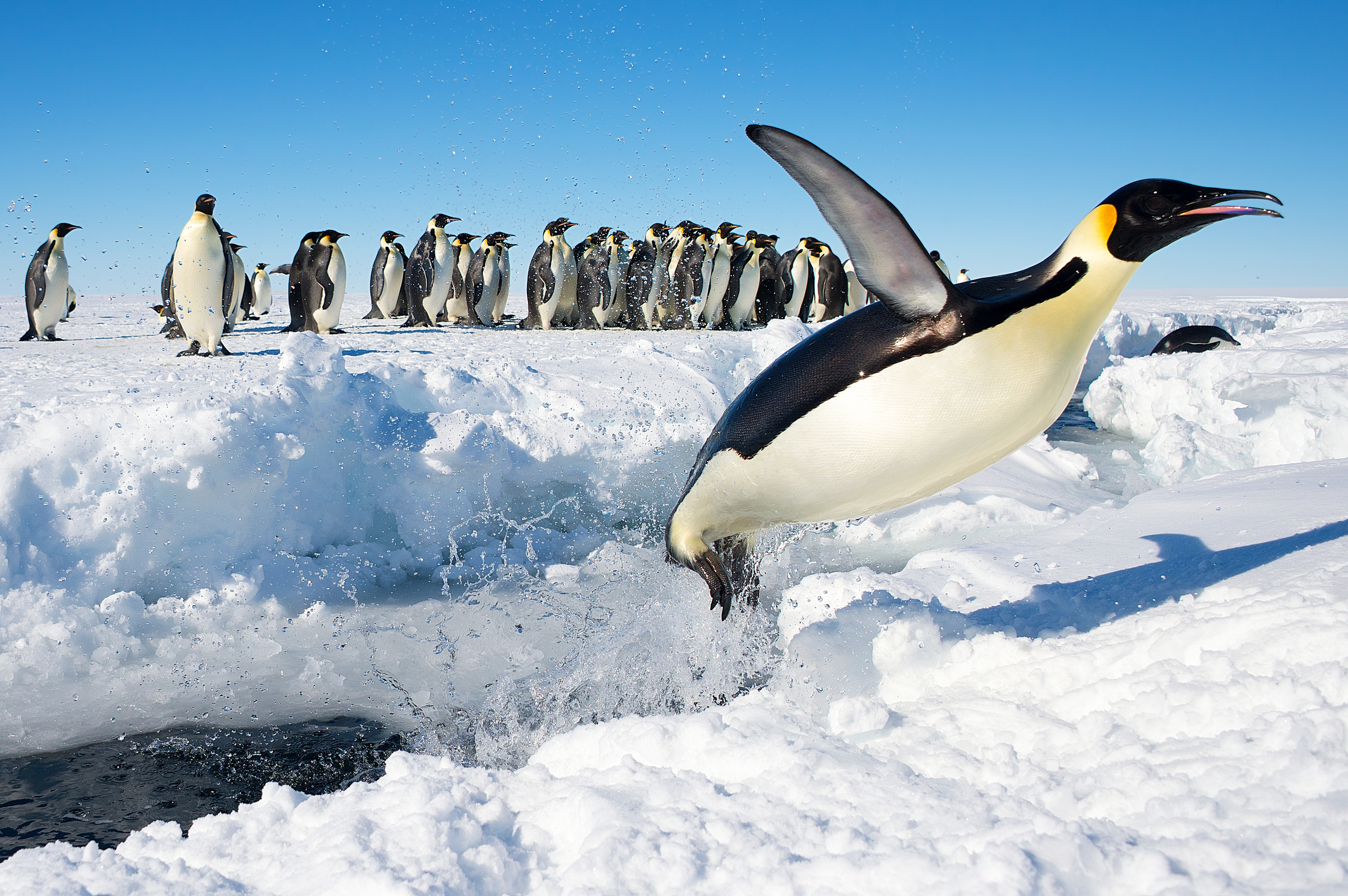
Emperor penguins breed in the IBA

Kloa Point is a prominent coastal point projecting from the east side of Edward VIII Plateau, 5.6 kilometres (3 nmi) north of Cape Gotley, Antarctica. It was mapped by Norwegian cartographers from aerial photographs taken by the Lars Christensen Expedition, 1936–37, and called by them Kloa ('claw').

== Important Bird Area ==
A 289 ha site on fast ice off the southern shore of the point has been designated an Important Bird Area (IBA) by BirdLife International because it supports about 3,300 breeding pairs of emperor penguins (Aptenodytes forsteri), based on 2009 satellite imagery.

Other birds observed in the vicinity of Kloa Point include the Adélie penguin (Pygoscelis adeliae), Antarctic tern (Sterna vittata), South polar skua (Stercorarius maccormicki), Southern fulmar (Fulmarus glacialoides), Snow petrel (Pagodroma nivea), Weddell seal (Leptonychotes weddellii), and Wilson's storm petrel (Oceanites oceanicus).
