= Kvarsnes =

Kvarsnes can refer to:

- Kvarsnes Foreland, a prominent foreland projecting into Edward VIII Bay, Antarctica
- Kvarsnes Bay, a small bay at the southwest side of Kvarsnes Foreland
- Kvarsnes, Norway, a village in Gildeskål Municipality in Nordland county, Norway
