= Conradi Peak =

Mountain in Antarctica

Conradi Peak (66°8′S 54°34′E) is an isolated peak, 1,040 metres (3,410 ft) high, rising northward of the Napier Mountains and inland from the coast, some 19 nautical miles (35 km) southwest of Cape Borley. It was discovered in January 1930 by the British Australian New Zealand Antarctic Research Expedition (BANZARE) under Mawson, who named it after a prominent member of the South African government who, in 1929, rendered much help to BANZARE during the stay of the Discovery at Cape Town.
