= Simmers Peaks =

Mountain in Antarctica

Simmers Peaks (66°6′S 52°48′E) is a group of three peaks, the highest 840 m, rising above the icecap 13 miles (21 km) southeast of Cape Close and 11 miles (18 km) north of Mount Codrington. They were discovered by the British Australian New Zealand Antarctic Research Expedition (BANZARE) under Mawson in 1930 and were named for R.G. Simmers, the meteorologist of the expedition.
