= Mount Pasco =

Mountain in Enderby Land, Antarctica

Mount Pasco (66°59′S 54°44′E) is a mountain standing westward of Edward VIII Bay, 18 nautical miles (33 km) west-southwest of Mount Storegutt. It was plotted from aerial photos taken by ANARE (Australian National Antarctic Research Expeditions) in 1956 and was named by the Antarctic Names Committee of Australia (ANCA) for Commander C. Pasco, Royal Navy, a member of the Australian Antarctic Exploration Committee of 1886.
