= Galten =

Galten may refer to:

- Galten (basin), a basin in Lake Mälaren in Sweden
- Galten, Denmark, a former railway town in eastern Jutland
- Galten Municipality, a former municipality in Denmark
- Galten Islands, a small group of islands in Antarctica
- RG-32M Galten, a mine-resistant armoured vehicle
