= East Stack =

Rock formation in Antarctica

East Stack (67°5′S 58°12′E) is a coastal rock outcrop which rises to 60 metres (200 ft) on the east side of Hoseason Glacier, 16 nautical miles (30 km) southeast of Edward VIII Bay in Antarctica. It was discovered in February 1936 by Discovery Investigations personnel on the William Scoresby, and probably so named by them for its distinctive appearance and association with nearby West Stack.
