= Bird Ridge =

Bird Ridge (66°47′S 55°4′E) is a partially ice-covered ridge 7 nautical miles (13 km) long, located 6 nautical miles (11 km) northwest of Mount Storegutt, westward of Edward VIII Bay in Alaska. It was mapped from aerial photos taken by the Australian National Antarctic Research Expeditions in 1956, and named for Ian Georg Bird, a senior electronics technician at Mawson Station in 1961.
