= Sandercock =

Sandercock may refer to:

== People ==
- Craig Sandercock, Australian rugby league coach
- Elmer Sandercock (1894–1971), Canadian politician
- Frank Sandercock (1887–1942), Canadian ice hockey administrator
- Kathryn Sandercock (born 2000), American softball player
- Leonie Sandercock (born 1949), Australian academic and urban planner
- Phil Sandercock (born 1953), English professional footballer

== Other ==
- Sandercock Nunataks, an isolated group of nunataks about 45 miles east-southeast of the Nye Mountains in Enderby Land, Antarctica
