= Mount Breckinridge =

Mountain in Antarctica

- Map of Antarctica indicating location of Mount Breckinridge

Highest point
- Elevation: 2,050 m (6,730 ft)
- Coordinates: 66°37′S 53°41′E

Geography
- Location: Enderby Land, East Antarctica
- Parent range: Napier Mountains

Geology
- Rock age: 2837 million years (Archaean eon)
- Mountain type: Metamorphic

Climbing
- Easiest route: basic snow/ice climb

Mount Breckinridge is a mountain, 2,050 metres (6,730 ft) high, standing 4 nautical miles (7 km) south of Stor Hånakken Mountain in the Napier Mountains of Enderby Land, Antarctica. It was mapped by Norwegian cartographers from aerial photos taken by the Lars Christensen Expedition of 1936–37, and was named "Langnuten" (the long peak). It was rephotographed by the Australian National Antarctic Research Expeditions in 1956 and renamed by the Antarctic Names Committee of Australia for J.E. Breckinridge a meteorologist at Wilkes Station in 1961.

== See also ==
- List of mountains of Enderby Land
