= Galten Islands =

Small group of islands in Antarctica

- Location within Antarctica

Geography
- Location: Antarctica
- Coordinates: 66°23′S 56°25′E

Administration
- Administered under the Antarctic Treaty System

Demographics
- Population: Uninhabited

The Galten Islands are a small group of islands in the eastern part of Magnet Bay, Antarctica, 19 kilometres (10 nmi) west of Cape Davis. They were mapped by Norwegian cartographers from aerial photographs taken by the Lars Christensen Expedition, 1936–37, and called Galten (the boar). They were first visited in 1957 by an Australian National Antarctic Research Expeditions party led by B.H. Stinear.

== See also ==
- List of antarctic and sub-antarctic islands
