= Nicholas Range =

Nicholas Range may refer to:

- Nicholas Range (Antarctic), a mountain range in Antarctic
- Nicholas Range (Pamir Mountains), a mountain range on the border of Afghanistan and Tajikistan
