= McLeod Nunataks =

Nunataks in Enderby Land, Antarctica

The McLeod Nunataks (67°29′S 52°42′E) are an isolated group of nunataks 35 nautical miles (65 km) southeast of the Tula Mountains in Enderby Land, Antarctica. They were photographed in 1956 by Australian National Antarctic Research Expeditions (ANARE) aircraft, and were first visited in December 1958 by an ANARE dog-sledge party, with the position fixed by G.A. Knuckey. The group was named by the Antarctic Names Committee of Australia for I.R. McLeod, a geologist at Mawson Station in 1958, and a member of the ANARE dog-sledge party.
