= Geology of Enderby Land =

Enderby Land
- Stratigraphic range: Archean to Paleozoic
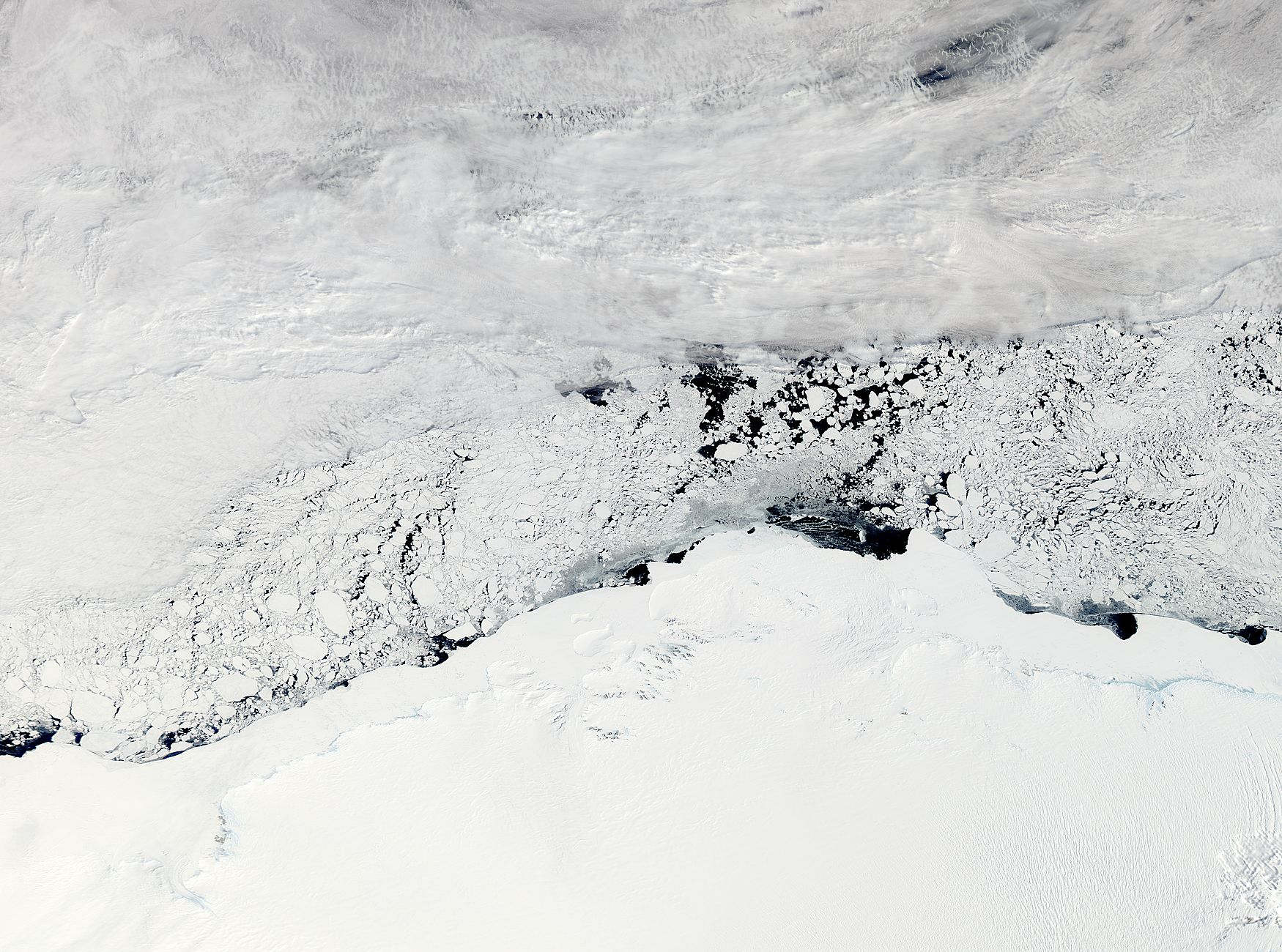
- Enderby Land, Antarctica. NASA MODIS image, 2011.
- Type: Geological formation
- Unit of: Napier Complex, Rayner Complex, Lützow-Holm Complex, Yamato–Belgica Complex

Location
- Coordinates: 68.27°S 31.57°E
- Region: Northeastern Antarctica

Type section
- Named for: Samuel Enderby & Sons
- Named by: John Briscoe and Whaling brig Tula
- Year defined: 1831
- Region: East Antarctica
- Country: Antarctica

The four distinct metamorphic complexes

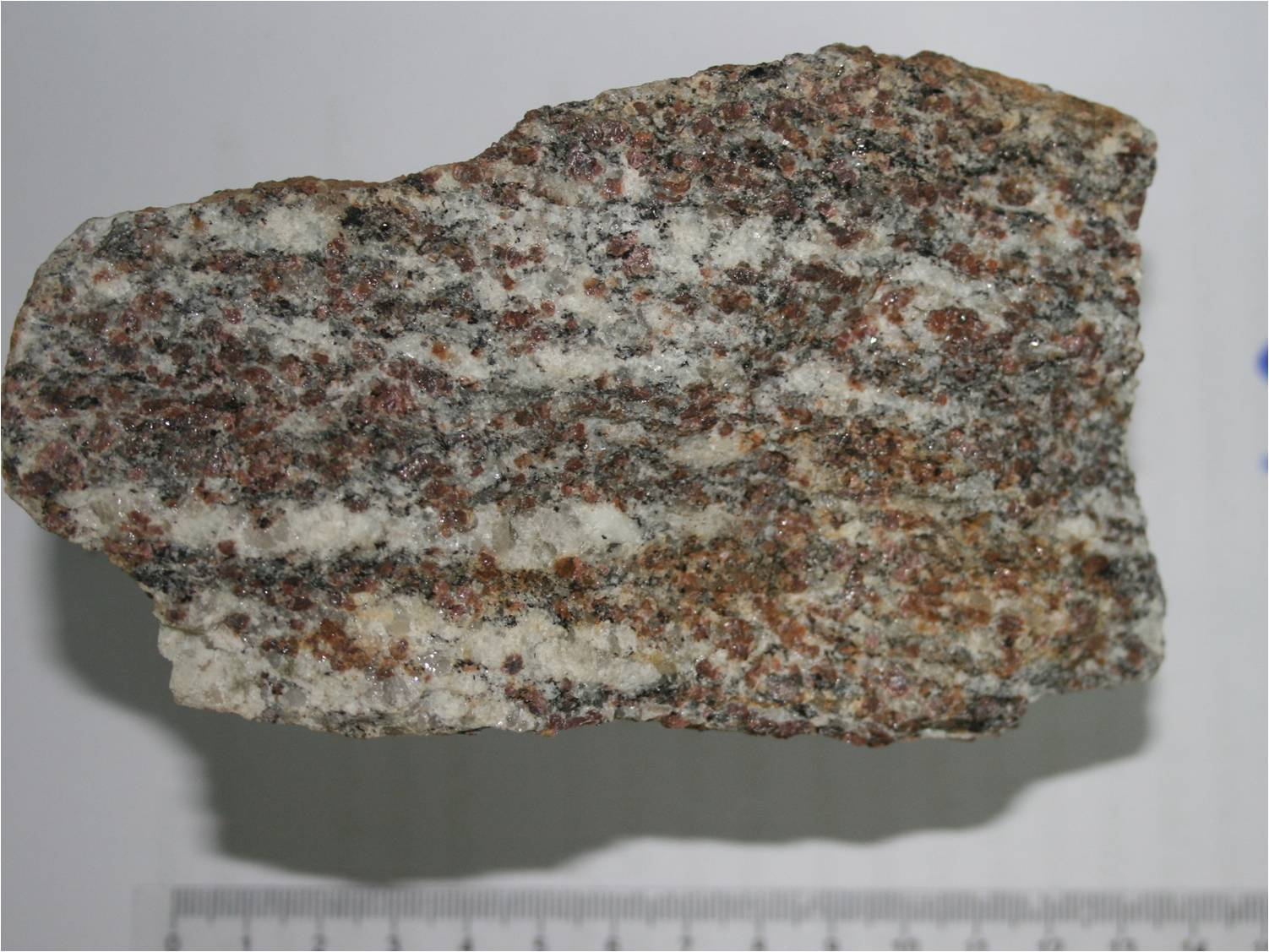
Garnet gneiss

Enderby Land is a region of Northeastern Antarctica which extends into the Southern Indian Ocean. The area is claimed by Australia as part of the Australian Antarctic Territory. The unique and diverse geological features of this region have been associated with the evolution and development of the supercontinent Gondwana. Multiple distinct geological formations are located in this region. The most prominent and important are the

1. Napier Complex (Archaean)
2. Rayner Complex (late-Proterozoic)
3. Lützow-Holm Complex (LHC) (early-Paleozoic)
4. Yamato–Belgica Complex (early-Paleozoic)

Both the Proterozoic and Paleozoic structures present in this region have become visible due to the initial uplift and exposure of the Archaean Napier Complex, where the oldest metamorphic rocks (4000 Ma) were found in the expanding Archaean blocks.

== Metamorphism ==
The high‐grade metamorphic rocks of Enderby Land, which form part of the East Antarctic Shield, have been subdivided into three major metamorphic core complexes. These are the

- Archaean Napier Complex
- Proterozoic Rayner Complex
- Paleozoic Lützow-Holm Complex (LHC)

The Napier Complex contains primarily pyroxene‐quartz‐feldspar gneiss and garnet‐quartz‐feldspar gneiss, with minor amounts of both pyroxene and mafic granulite. There are also a variety of siliceous and aluminous metasediments present. Multiple mafic dykes are also present in the area which intrude into the gneisses. The ultra-high-temperature (UHT) Napier metamorphic complex is noteworthy and distinctive due to the presence of the highest grades of metamorphism seen in rocks of any continental crust. The early predecessors of tonalitic and granitic gneisses range in age locally up to 3800 Ma, and therefore are the oldest rocks documented from Antarctica. It is generally agreed upon that all the high-grade and ultra-high-temperature metamorphism in the area was finished by the end of the Archean. Effects of the metamorphism are mostly restricted to regions of retrogression and localized shear zones in the area.

The Rayner Complex consists predominately of re‐metamorphosed Napier Complex rocks, and mafic dykes that occur only as metamorphosed remnants. The rocks of the Rayner Complex are generally of a lower metamorphic grade (upper amphibolite to granulite facies) than those found in the Napier Complex. There are however, high-pressure granulites that can be found locally. Higher water pressures were inferred from observation of relatively abundant migmatitic gneisses and hydrous minerals such as biotite and hornblende, as well as the lack of mesoperthite.

The Lützow-Holm Complex experienced regional metamorphism in the early Paleozoic. This metamorphic complex contains metamorphic ages associated with the Pan-African orogeny (520 and 560 Ma). The main regional metamorphism in the LHC is related to continent-continent collision between portions of the Gondwana supercontinent. This area may include remains of a potential suture between East and West Gondwana. The metamorphic grade increases gradually from the Prince Olav Coast (amphibolite facies; eastern part of the LHC) to the Soya Coast (granulite facies; western part of the LHC).

== Tectonic evolution ==
Two major tectonic processes could have influenced the formation of the present structures seen in Enderby Land.

- Grenville and Pan-African orogenic events
- Breakup of Gondwana

As evidenced by the figure visible below, there are multiple viable examples of occurrences and structures which could relate to the hypothesis described.

The Pan-African orogenic event is linked with NE-SW compression in Western and Eastern Gondwana. This compression could have possibly produced the strong seismic reflections which were detected in the Lützow-Holm Complex (LHC), as well as the neighboring Princess Elizabeth Land (PEL). After Gondwana broke up there seemed to be NW-SE extension which affected the graben structure found in the Prince Charles Mountains (PCM) and the diversity found around the Moho.

There is a general consensus that the Napier Complex could be a nucleus during the amalgamation of East-West Gondwanaland. The Rayner Complex is thought to be a rim of the Napier nucleus, and the western part of this complex seems to have been reworked at the Pan-African age. Surface structures in this area contain near right angles in a generally N-S trending East African/Antarctic Orogen as verified by the presence of discovered magnetic anomalies.

== Recent scientific studies ==
Multiple countries including Australia, Russia, and Japan have conducted recent marine surveys over the past several decades which have collected integrated data sets from seismic, gravitational, and magnetic studies in the southern Indian Ocean surrounding Enderby Land. This data was combined and compiled in order to create an improved definition of crustal magnetic anomaly patterns and to help further understand the igneous activity and breakup processes associated with the creation of the East Antarctic passive margin.

Two recent deep seismic surveys were carried out on the continental ice-sheet of the Lützow-Holm Complex in 2000 and 2002. The two surveys were carried out as a program of the “Structure and Evolution of the East Antarctic Lithosphere” (SEAL) by the Japanese Antarctic expeditions. Crustal velocity models and simple reflection sections were taken and data was compiled.

1. SEAL-2000

- Average velocity of the uppermost crust equaled 6.2 km/s
- Average velocities of the lower crust and uppermost mantle equaled 6.7-6.9 km/s
- Average Moho depth equaled 40 km

2. SEAL-2002

- Average velocities of the uppermost crust equaled 5.9-6.2 km/s
- Seismic velocity discontinuity lying around 20 km depth (between upper and middle crust)
- Average velocities of the lower crust and uppermost mantle equaled 6.7-6.9 km/s
- Average Moho depth equaled 40 km

Enderby Land is known to have higher seismic velocities than other neighboring regions, with its center around the Napier Complex, as determined by surface wave tomographic studies. Additionally, the depth of the lithospheric rock body beneath the Napier complex acquired from the seismic body wave tomography is found to be about 250 km.

== See also ==
- Enderby Land
- Australian Antarctic Territory
- Napier Mountains
