= Mount Pardoe =

Mountain in Antarctica

Mount Pardoe (67°8′S 50°11′E) is a mountain, 790 m, between Wyers Ice Shelf and Priestley Peak on the shore of Amundsen Bay in Enderby Land. It was plotted from air photos taken from ANARE (Australian National Antarctic Research Expeditions) aircraft in 1956 and was named by the Antarctic Names Committee of Australia (ANCA) for Dr. R. Pardoe, a medical officer at Mawson Station in 1961.
