= Batterbee =

Batterbee may refer to:

- Harry Batterbee (1880–1976), British civil servant and diplomat
- Cape Batterbee, Enderby Land, Antarctica
