= Edward Ridge =

Edward Ridge (67°15′S 55°34′E) is a gently rising, snow-covered ridge standing 13 nautical miles (24 km) northwest of Rayner Peak in Enderby Land, Antarctica. It was plotted from air photos taken from Australian National Antarctic Research Expeditions (ANARE) aircraft in 1959, and was named by the Antarctic Names Committee of Australia for Edward Nash, an aircraft mechanic with ANARE (Nella Dan), under Phillip Law in 1965.
