= Brødrene Rocks =

- Location within Antarctica

Geography
- Location: Antarctica
- Coordinates: 66°17′S 56°6′E

Administration
- Administered under the Antarctic Treaty System

Demographics
- Population: Uninhabited

The Brødrene Rocks are a group of rocks lying in the entrance to Wheeler Bay, just northwest of Magnet Bay. They were mapped by Norwegian cartographers from aerial photos taken by the Lars Christensen Expedition, 1936–37, and named Brødrene ('the brothers').
