= Aker Peaks =

Mountain range in Antarctica

Highest point
- Elevation: 1,800 m (5,900 ft)
- Coordinates: 66°37′S 55°13′E

Geography
- Location: Enderby Land, Antarctica

Aker Peaks, also known as Akar Peaks or Aker Range, are a series of mainly snow-covered peaks, the highest at 1,800 metres (5,900 ft), extending 9 miles (14 km) in a northwest–southeast direction. They rise 4 miles (6 km) west of Nicholas Range and 30 miles (50 km) west-northwest of Edward VIII Bay. They were discovered on January 14, 1931, by a Norwegian whaling expedition under O. Borchgrevink, who named them after the farm of Director Svend Foyn Bruun, Sr. of the Antarctic Whaling Company at Tønsberg.
