= Priestley Peak =

Mountain in Antarctica

- Location within Antarctica

Highest point
- Coordinates: 67°12′S 50°23′E

Geography
- Location: Antarctica

Priestley Peak is a peak between Mount Pardoe and Mount Tod on the south side of Amundsen Bay in Enderby Land. It was sighted on 14 January 1930 by the British Australian New Zealand Antarctic Research Expedition (BANZARE) under Mawson, who named it for Sir Raymond Priestley, a member of the British Antarctic Expedition of 1910–13.
