= West Stack =

Rock formation in Antarctica

West Stack (67°3′S 58°3′E) is a coastal rock outcrop which rises to 120 m on the west side of Hoseason Glacier, 14 nautical miles (26 km) southeast of Edward VIII Bay. Discovered in February 1936 by DI personnel on the William Scoresby, and probably so named by them because of its distinctive appearance and association with nearby East Stack.

== See also ==
- Stack Bay
