= Saint Martin Island =

Saint Martin Island may refer to:

- Saint Martin (island), an island in the northeast Caribbean
  - Collectivity of Saint Martin, the French part of the island
  - Sint Maarten, the Dutch part of the island
- St. Martin Island, an island in Michigan
- St. Martin's Island, an island of Bangladesh in the Bay of Bengal
- St Martin's, Isles of Scilly

== See also ==
- Saint Martin (disambiguation)
- Martin Island (disambiguation)
