= Cape Gotley =

Headland in Antarctica

Cape Gotley (66°42′S 57°19′E) is a cape forming the eastern extremity of Austnes Peninsula at the north side of the entrance to Edward VIII Bay, Antarctica. It was mapped by Norwegian cartographers from aerial photos taken by the Lars Christensen Expedition, 1936–37, and called "Austnestangen" (the east cape tongue), a name derived from that of the peninsula. The area was remapped by Australian National Antarctic Research Expeditions (ANARE) and in 1958 the cape renamed by the Antarctic Names Committee of Australia for A.V. Gotley, officer in charge of the ANARE party on Heard Island in 1948.

== See also ==
- Styles Bluff
