= Cape Davis =

Cape Davis (66°24′S 56°50′E) is a rounded, ice-covered cape along the north coast of Edward VIII Plateau, 17 kilometres (9 nmi) east of Magnet Bay. It was discovered on 12 January 1930 by the British Australian and New Zealand Antarctic Research Expedition (BANZARE) under Mawson, who named it for Captain John King Davis, Director of Navigation under the Commonwealth Government and ship's captain and second in command of BANZARE.
