= Harold Brown Award =

Award given by the United States Air Force

The Harold Brown Award is the highest award given by the United States Air Force to a scientist or engineer who applies scientific research to solve a problem critical to the needs of the Air Force.

== History and purpose ==
The Harold Brown Award is intended to recognize significant achievements in research and development. It is named for Harold Brown, a physicist who served as United States Secretary of the Air Force from 1965-1969, and later as United States Secretary of Defense (1977-1981).

The Harold Brown award is presented annually to a person whose achievements in research and development have led to, or demonstrated promise of, a substantial improvement in the operational effectiveness of the Air Force. It is awarded through the United States Air Force chief scientist's office.

The winner of the award receives a brass medallion set in a block of Lucite and a certificate signed by the Secretary of the Air Force and the Chief of Staff of the Air Force. The name of the winner is also engraved on a plaque near the office of the Secretary of the Air Force and he or she may also wear the Air Force Recognition Ribbon (military) or Air Force Recognition Lapel Pin (civilian) as appropriate.

== List of recipients ==
Recipients of the Harold Brown Award include:

| Year | Name | Notes |
|---|---|---|
| 1969 | Ronald W. Terry | |
| 1975 | John R. Boyd | United States Air Force fighter pilot and Pentagon consultant |
| 1976 | Herbert J. Hickey, Jr | For engineering F-15 handling qualities. |
| 1977 | Joseph C. Foster, Jr. | University of Illinois/Urbana-Champaign Awarded for research in advanced conventional warheads while at the Air Force Armament Laboratory, Eglin AFB FL |
| 1978 | Henry Berry Garrett | Project scientist for the SCATHA (Spacecraft Charging at High Altitude) program For developing a mathematical model of the earth's space environment at high altitudes |
| 1979 | Terence James Elkins | |
| 1982 | Raymond P. Urtz | |
| 1985 | George A. Vanasse | Physicist at the US Air Force Geophysics Laboratory at Hanscom Air Force Base in Bedford, Massachusetts |
| 1986 | John F. Paulson | Air Force Research Laboratory, Hanscom Field, Lexington, Massachusetts Awarded for major advances in ion-molecule chemical kinetics |
| 1987 | Davy Belk | Member of the Senior Executive Service and Director, Information Directorate, Air Force Research Laboratory, Rome, New York; For developing computational fluid dynamics methods. |
| 1990 | Carl E. Baum | Senior Scientist at the Air Force Research Laboratory |
| 1991 | Northrup Fowler III | |
| 1994 | William F. Storm | |
| 1995 | John M. Reising | Air Force Research Laboratory; For the successful transition of cockpit technology including pictorial displays, voice control and display symbology |
| 1997 | Jeffrey L. Craig | for Panoramic Night Vision Goggle Development |
| 1998 | Chi Tsieh (Jimmy) Liu | |
| 1999 | Robert Q. Fugate | |
| 2000 | Frank Marcos | |
| 2001 | Dean F. Kocian | |
| 2002 | Nelson Forster | Air Force Research Laboratory at Wright-Patterson Air Force Base, Ohio; For his work developing corrosion-resistant materials for engine mechanical systems |
| 2003 | Dr Peter M. Wegner | For his work in developing spacecraft technologies |
| 2004 | H. John Mucks | Electronics engineer for the Air Force Research Laboratory, Rome, New York; For the web-based Time Line Analysis System. |
| 2005 | John A. Caldwell | Air Force Research Laboratory at Brooks City-Base, Texas; For his research on the effects of fatigue. |
| 2007 | Jim F. Riker | Air Force Research Laboratory |
| 2008 | Mark Haney | |
| 2009 | Derek Kingston | Air Vehicles Directorate; For improvements to the technology for cooperative unmanned air vehicle (UAV) route surveillance |
| 2010 | Dr. Candace Lynch | Senior scientist at Hanscom Air Force Base, Mass. For pioneering new infrared technology. |
| 2011 | Dr. Michael Hooser | A chief scientist from Holloman Air Force Base, New Mexico; For his role in significant advances in hypersonic missile research. |
| 2012 | Dr. Mark H. Draper | A senior engineering research psychologist, Air Force Research Laboratory's 711th Human Performance; For human factors research. |
| 2013 | Dr. Peter J. Collins | Associate Professor of Electrical Engineering, Graduate School of Engineering and Management, Air Force Institute of Technology |
| 2014 | Dr. Donald R. Erbschloe | Senior Level Executive (SL) and Chief Scientist of the Air Mobility Command, Scott Air Force Base, Illinois |
| 2015 | Dr Lisa Tripp | Airman Systems Directorate's Continuous Learning Branch; For innovative and cost-saving training methods and platforms for the Air Force intelligence community |
| 2016 | Lt Col (sel) Joseph C. Pomager | Program Manager, Command & Control Systems, Integrated Combat Systems Division, Air Force Rapid Capabilities Office Led Chief of Staff-directed effort to increase situational awareness, streamline command and control, and shorten the kill-chain, while reducing stove-piping. |
| 2018 | Dr. Robert Johnson | Principal investigator at Air Force Research Laboratory Starfire Optical Range (SOR). For outstanding contributions including identifying a breakthrough in physics that enables high-resolution ground to space imaging |
| 2019 | Dr. Odell Reynolds | Senior engineer at Air Force Research Laboratory Starfire Optical Range (SOR). For leading a $15 million project with 30 team members that increased Low-Earth Orbit (LEO) imaging visibility during the dark hours by three times. |
| 2021 | Maj. Ronald Kemker | In recognition of Dr. Kemker's significant achievements in aviation electronics development for dozens of Automatic Target Recognition models, a novel data fusion scheme and five processing algorithms. |
| 2023 | Dr. Scott Nykl | In recognition of Dr. Nykl's research related to airborne visual relative navigation using computer vision. |

== See also ==
- List of general science and technology awards
- List of engineering awards
- List of physics awards
- List of space technology awards
