= Cape Monakov =

Cape in Enderby Land, Antarctica

Cape Monakov (67°9′S 48°41′E) is a cape on the west coast of Sakellari Peninsula, Enderby Land, Antarctica. The region was photographed by the Australian National Antarctic Research Expeditions in 1956 and by the Soviet Antarctic Expedition in 1957. The cape was named by the Soviet expedition after S. Ye. Monakov, a Soviet polar aviator who perished in the Arctic.
