= Young Nunataks =

Nunataks in Enderby Land, Antarctica

Young Nunataks (66°44′S 54°8′E) is a group of nunataks in the Napier Mountains standing 2 nautical miles (3.7 km) south of Mount Elkins, Antarctica. Mapped by Norwegian cartographers from aerial photos taken by the Lars Christensen Expedition, 1936–37. Remapped from aerial photos taken by ANARE (Australian National Antarctic Research Expeditions) in 1956 and named for W.F. Young, electrical fitter at Mawson Station in 1961.
