= List of glaciers of Kemp Land =

Location of Kemp Land (red), Australian Antarctic Territory in Antarctica

Following is a list of glaciers of Kemp Land in Antarctica. This list may not reflect recently named glaciers in Kemp Land.

== Cosgrove Glacier ==
67°29′S 59°10′E. Small glacier entering the south part of Stefansson Bay just west of Mulebreen. Seen from an Australian National Antarctic Research Expeditions (ANARE) aircraft in 1956 and later mapped. Named by Antarctic Names Committee of Australia (ANCA) for M. Cosgrove, radio supervisor at Mawson Station, 1959.

== Hoseason Glacier ==
67°06′S 58°07′E. Glacier 12 nautical miles (22 km; 14 mi) long, flowing north into the sea between West Stack and East Stack, 15 nautical miles (28 km; 17 mi) east of Edward VIII Bay. Roughly mapped by Norwegian cartographers from aerial photos taken by the Lars Christensen Expedition, 1936–37. Visited in 1954 by an ANARE sledging party and named by ANCA for Richard Hoseason of ANARE, who perished on a field trip at Heard Island in 1952.

== Mulebreen ==
67°28′S 59°21′E. Glacier 6 nautical miles (11 km; 6.9 mi) wide, flowing west-north-west into the southeast side of Stefansson Bay. First mapped by Norwegian cartographers from air photos taken by the Lars Christensen Expedition 1936–37, and named Mulebreen (the snout glacier). Between 1980 and 2023 the glacier advanced by 13.5 km.

Not: Dovers Glacier. (Note: Some sources name the glacier "Mulebreen glacier". This is incorrect, since "Mulebreen" alone means "Snout glacier". It is not the "Snout glacier glacier".)

== Rippon Glacier ==
66°40′S 56°29′E. Small glacier, close east of Seaton Glacier, flowing southward into Edward VIII Ice Shelf. Mapped from aerial photos taken by ANARE in 1956, and named for Sgt. R. Rippon, RAAF, airframe fitter at Mawson in 1959.

== Wilma Glacier ==
67°12′S 56°00′E. The western of two glaciers entering the southern part of Edward VIII Bay. Seen by an ANARE party led by Robert Dovers in November 1954. Named by ANCA for the wife of Robert Dovers, officer in charge and surveyor at Mawson Station in 1954.

== Wilson Glacier ==
66°46′S 56°25′E. Glacier 9 nautical miles (17 km; 10 mi) long, flowing northeast into Edward VIII Ice Shelf just south of Seaton Glacier. Photographed from ANARE aircraft in 1956. Named by ANCA for Flight Lt. H.O. Wilson, RAAF pilot at Mawson Station, 1959, who was killed in an aircraft accident shortly after his return to Australia.

== Sources ==
- Alberts, Fred G., ed. (1995). Geographic names of the Antarctic. National Science Foundation. hdl:2027/uc1.31210012997928. OCLC 681290709.
- Dømgaard, Mads; Schomacker, Anders; Isaksson, Elisabeth; Millan, Romain; Huiban, Flora; Dehecq, Amaury; Fleischer, Amanda; Moholdt, Geir; Andersen, Jonas K.; Bjørk, Anders A. (25 May 2024). "Early aerial expedition photos reveal 85 years of glacier growth and stability in East Antarctica". Nature Communications. 15 (1): 4466. Bibcode:2024NatCo..15.4466D. doi:10.1038/s41467-024-48886-x. PMC 11127979. PMID 38796492.
