= Marble Rock (Antarctica) =

Geographical feature in Antarctica

Coordinates: 67°36′S 62°50′E

Marble Rock is a rock outcrop at the edge of the ice cliff about 0.8 nautical miles (1.5 km) west-southwest of West Arm and Mawson Station, on the coast of Mac. Robertson Land, Antarctica. It was first plotted from air photos taken by the Lars Christensen Expedition, 1936–37, and was so named by the Antarctic Names Committee of Australia because of marble beds described there by D.S. Trail, a geologist at Mawson Station in 1961.
