= Martin Island (Antarctica) =

Island in Antarctica

- Location within Antarctica

Geography
- Location: Antarctica
- Coordinates: 66°44′S 57°0′E

Administration
- Administered under the Antarctic Treaty System

Demographics
- Population: Uninhabited

Martin Island is a small island in the northern part of Edward VIII Bay, Antarctica, just off the south shore of Edward VIII Plateau. It was mapped by Norwegian cartographers from aerial photos taken by the Lars Christensen Expedition, 1936–37, and called "Utvikgalten" (the outer bay boar). The island was remapped by the Australian National Antarctic Research Expeditions (ANARE), and was renamed by the Antarctic Names Committee of Australia in 1958 for A.R. Martin, officer in charge of the ANARE party at Macquarie Island in 1948.

== See also ==
- List of Antarctic and sub-Antarctic islands
