= Rayner Peak =

Mountain in Antarctica

Rayner Peak (67°24′S 55°56′E) is a prominent peak, 1,270 m, standing 35 nautical miles (60 km) southwest of the head of Edward VIII Bay and 2 nautical miles (3.7 km) west of Robert Glacier. It was discovered in February 1936 by DI personnel on the William Scoresby and was named for George W. Rayner, a zoologist on the DI staff and leader of the expedition.

== See also ==
- Edward Ridge
