= Vicars Island =

Island in Enderby Land, Antarctica

- Location within Antarctica

Geography
- Location: Antarctica
- Coordinates: 65°51′S 54°24′E

Administration
- Administered under the Antarctic Treaty System

Demographics
- Population: Uninhabited

Vicars Island is a small ice-covered island about 3.7 kilometres (2 nmi) off the coast of Enderby Land. It was discovered on 12 January 1930 by the British Australian New Zealand Antarctic Research Expedition (BANZARE) under Mawson. He named it after an Australian textile company which presented the expedition with cloth for uniforms.

== See also ==
- List of antarctic and sub-antarctic islands
