= Robert Glacier =

Glacier in Kemp Land, Antarctica

- Location within Antarctica
- Location: Enderby Land
- Coordinates: 67°11′S 55°40′E
- Thickness: unknown
- Terminus: Edward VIII Bay
- Status: unknown

Robert Glacier is the eastern of two glaciers in Kemp Land entering the southern part of Edward VIII Bay . It was seen by Robert Dovers and G. Schwartz in 1954 while carrying out a sledge journey and survey of Edward VIII Bay . The other (western) glacier is Wilma Glacier.

It was named by ANCA for Dovers, who was surveyor and officer in charge at Mawson Station in 1954. It is part of the Australian Antarctic Gazetteer and the SCAR Composite Gazetteer of Antarctica.

== See also ==
- List of glaciers in the Antarctic
- Wilma Glacier
- Kemp Land
- Glaciology
