= Sandercock Nunataks =

Nunataks in Enderby Land, Antarctica

Sandercock Nunataks (68°32′S 52°4′E) is an isolated group of nunataks about 45 miles east-southeast of the Nye Mountains in Enderby Land. They were discovered and visited in Dec. 1959 by an ANARE (Australian National Antarctic Research Expeditions) airborne survey party, and named by ANCA for Squadron Leader J.C. Sandercock, RAAF, officer commanding the RAAF Antarctic Flight at Mawson Station, 1959.
