= Seaton Glacier =

Glacier in Antarctica

- Location within Antarctica
- Location: Enderby Land
- Coordinates: 66°43′S 56°26′E
- Length: 17 nmi (31 km; 20 mi)
- Thickness: unknown
- Terminus: Edward VIII Bay
- Status: unknown

Seaton Glacier (66°43′S 56°26′E) is a glacier 17 miles (27 km) long, flowing southeast into Edward VIII Ice Shelf at the northwest part of Edward VIII Bay. It was mapped by Norwegian cartographers from aerial photos taken by the Lars Christensen Expedition, 1936–37, remapped, 1954–58, by ANARE (Australian National Antarctic Research Expeditions) and named by ANCA in 1958 for Flight Lt. John Seaton, RAAF, pilot with ANARE at Mawson in 1956.

== See also ==
- List of glaciers in the Antarctic
- Glaciology
