= Mawson Corridor =

Sea passage near Mawson Station, Antarctica

Mawson Corridor (67°0′S 63°0′E) is a sea passage between grounded icebergs on the approach to Mawson Station at Holme Bay, Antarctica. It is about 22 nautical miles (41 km; 25 mi) long and 4 to 5 nautical miles (7 to 9 km; 5 to 6 mi) wide, opening out at the southern end to give the feature a funnel shape. The northern end at 66°45′S 63°20′E is sharply defined and coincides with the edge of the continental shelf; from there it bears 202°. The passage was discovered by the Australian National Antarctic Research Expeditions (ANARE) in 1954, and was used regularly by ANARE relief ships in their approach to Mawson Station.
