= Grimsley Peaks =

Mountains of Antarctica

The Grimsley Peaks (66°34′S 53°40′E) are five linear peaks just south of Stor Hanakken Mountain in the Napier Mountains of Enderby Land, Antarctica. They were mapped by Norwegian cartographers from air photos taken by the Lars Christensen Expedition of 1936–37. They were remapped from air photos taken by Australian National Antarctic Research Expeditions in 1956 and were named by the Antarctic Names Committee of Australia for S.W. Grimsley, a technical officer (ionosphere) at Wilkes Station in 1961.
