= Cape Close =

Headland in Enderby Land, Antarctica

Cape Close (65°55′S 52°29′E) is a cape on the coast of Enderby Land, 30 nautical miles (60 km) west of Cape Batterbee. It was discovered by the British Australian New Zealand Antarctic Research Expedition, 1929–31, under Mawson, who named it for Sir Charles Close, President of the Royal Geographical Society, 1927–30.
