= Grimsley (surname) =

Grimsley is a surname. Notable people with the surname include:

- Chet Grimsley (born 1956), American football player
- Crawford Grimsley (born 1967), American boxer and kickboxer
- Denise Grimsley (born 1959), American politician
- Greer Grimsley, American opera singer
- Jack Grimsley, Australian musician
- James Grimsley, Jr. (1921–2013), United States Army general
- Jason Grimsley (born 1967), American baseball player
- Jim Grimsley (born 1955), American writer
- John Grimsley (1962–2008), American football player
- Ross Grimsley (born 1950), American baseball player
- Ross Grimsley (1950s pitcher) (1922–1994), American baseball player
