= Entrance Shoal =

Shoal off Entrance Island, Antarctica

Entrance Shoal (67°36′S 62°52′E) is a small shoal, with a least depth of 7.9 metres (26 ft), just west of Entrance Island at the northwest entrance to Horseshoe Harbour in Holme Bay, Mac. Robertson Land. It was charted in February 1961 by d'A.T. Gale, hydrographic surveyor with the Australian National Antarctic Research Expeditions (Thala Dan), and so named because of its location.
