= Mount Griffiths =

Mountain in Enderby Land, Antarctica

Mount Griffiths (66°29′S 54°3′E) is an elongated mountain with two prominent peaks of 1,650 and 1,680 metres (5,400 and 5,500 ft), standing 5 miles (8 km) northwest of the Wilkinson Peaks and 23 kilometres (14 mi) northwest of Mount Elkins in the Napier Mountains of Enderby Land, Antarctica.

== Discovery and naming ==
The mountain was plotted by Norwegian cartographers from aerial photos taken by the Lars Christensen Expedition of 1936–37, and was called "Mefjell" (middle mountain), a name used elsewhere in Antarctica. It was visited in 1961 by an Australian National Antarctic Research Expeditions sledge party and was named by the Antarctic Names Committee of Australia for G.S. Griffiths, a member of the Australian Antarctic Exploration Committee of 1886.
