= East Arm, Antarctica =

Rock mass in Mac. Robertson Land, Antarctica

East Arm (67°36′S 62°53′E) is a rock mass forming the eastern limit of Horseshoe Harbour in Holme Bay, Mac. Robertson Land, Antarctica. It was roughly mapped by Norwegian cartographers from air photos taken by the Lars Christensen Expedition, 1936–37, and was rephotographed by U.S. Navy Operation Highjump, 1946–47. It was first visited by an Australian National Antarctic Research Expeditions (ANARE) party on February 5, 1954, and was named by ANARE.
