= Cape Borley =

Headland in Enderby Land, Antarctica

Cape Borley (65°56′S 55°10′E) is an ice-covered cape protruding slightly from the coast midway between Cape Batterbee and Magnet Bay. It was discovered in January 1930 by the British Australian New Zealand Antarctic Research Expedition (BANZARE) under Mawson, who named it for John Oliver Borley, a member of the Discovery Committee, who assisted BANZARE with arrangements to take over the Discovery.
