= Horseshoe Harbour =

Harbour in Antarctica

Horseshoe Harbour (67°36′S 62°52′E) is a harbour in Holme Bay, Mac. Robertson Land, Antarctica, formed by the horseshoe-shaped rock projections of West Arm and East Arm. Mawson Station is at the head of this harbour. It was roughly mapped by Norwegian cartographers from air photos taken by the Lars Christensen Expedition, 1936–37, and rephotographed by U.S. Navy Operation Highjump, 1946–47. The harbour was first visited by an Australian National Antarctic Research Expeditions party under Phillip Law, who selected this site for Mawson Station (named after Australian geologist and explorer Douglas Mawson), established on 13 February 1954.

== See also ==
- Entrance Shoal
