= Martin Islands (Antarctica) =

Island in Antarctica

Coordinates: 65°37′S 65°22′W

The Martin Islands are a group of islands and rocks 5 nautical miles (9 km) in extent lying 5 nautical miles east of the northern part of Renaud Island, and 1 nautical mile (2 km) west of Vieugue Island in Grandidier Channel, Antarctica. A group of islands to the north of "Pitt Island" was roughly charted and named "Martin Islands" for Captain Martin of the Argentine Navy, by the French Antarctic Expedition, 1903–05, under Jean-Baptiste Charcot. Aerial surveys have shown that what appeared to be one large island, Pitt, is actually a group of small islands. As they lie in one group with no logical division between them, the earlier name of Pitt was amended to Pitt Islands and extended to cover all the islands north of Renaud Island. The name Martin Islands was transferred to the group now described in order to preserve Charcot's name in the area.

== See also ==
- List of Antarctic and sub-Antarctic islands
