= Aagaard Islands =

Islands near Antarctica

- Location within Antarctica

Geography
- Location: Antarctica
- Coordinates: 65°51′S 53°40′E

Administration
- Administered under the Antarctic Treaty System

Demographics
- Population: Uninhabited

Aagaard Islands also known as Bjarne Aagaard Islands or Ostrova B'yarne-Ogor, are a group of small islands lying to the west of Proclamation Island and Cape Batterbee, near the coast of Antarctica in the Southern Ocean. They were discovered in January 1930 by the British Australian and New Zealand Antarctic Research Expedition (BANZARE) under Sir Douglas Mawson, and were named after Bjarne Aagaard.

== See also ==
- List of Antarctic and sub-Antarctic islands
