= Mount Codrington =

Mountain in Enderby Land, Antarctica

Mount Codrington (66°18′S 52°52′E) is a prominent mountain, 1,520 metres (5,000 ft) high, standing 24 miles (39 km) south-southeast of Cape Close, 17 miles (27 km) east of Johnston Peak, and 11 miles (18 km) south of Simmers Peaks. Mount Codrington forms the northeastern end of the Napier Mountains.

It was charted in 1930 by the British Australian New Zealand Antarctic Research Expedition under Mawson as being the prominent peak sighted and so named by John Biscoe in March 1831.

== See also ==
- History of Antarctica
- List of Antarctic expeditions
