= Stor Hånakken Mountain =

Mountain in Enderby Land, Antarctica

Stor Hånakken Mountain (also Mount Bennett) (66°32′S 53°38′E) is a prominent mountain, 1,970 m, standing in the central part of the Napier Mountains in Enderby Land. The mountain was mapped by Norwegian cartographers from aerial photographs taken in January–February 1937 by the Lars Christensen expedition and named by them Store Hånakken (the great shark's neck, or nape). It was visited in 1960 by an ANARE (Australian National Antarctic Research Expeditions) party led by Sydney L. Kirkby.
