= Proclamation Island =

Island in Antarctica

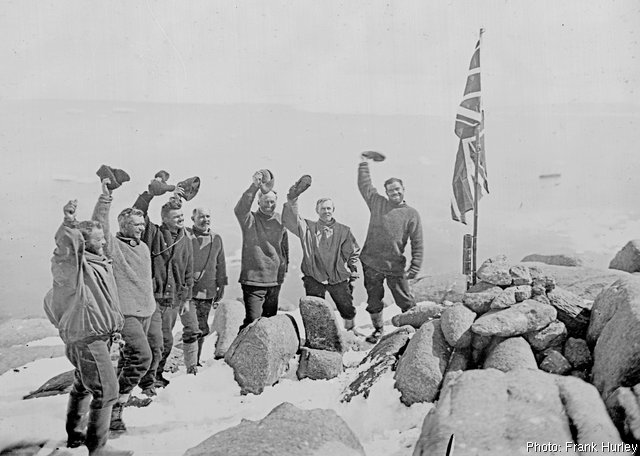
- Douglas Mawson's team claim Proclamation Island for the Crown, 13 January 1930

- Location within Antarctica

Geography
- Location: Southern Ocean
- Coordinates: 65°51′S 53°41′E
- Highest elevation: 244 m (801 ft)

Administration
- Administered under the Antarctic Treaty System

Demographics
- Population: Uninhabited

Proclamation Island is a small rocky island 2.5 nautical miles (5 km; 3 mi) west of Cape Batterbee and close east of the Aagaard Islands of Antarctica.

== Historic site ==
The island was discovered by the British Australian New Zealand Antarctic Research Expedition (BANZARE), led by Douglas Mawson, 1929–1931, and so named, following the reading of a proclamation on its summit on 13 January 1930 claiming the area for the British Crown. A cairn and plaque erected by Mawson at the time to commemorate the event has been designated a Historic Site or Monument (HSM 3) following a proposal by Australia to the Antarctic Treaty Consultative Meeting.

== See also ==
- List of Antarctic and subantarctic islands
