= Isochron =

In the mathematical theory of dynamical systems, an isochron is a set of initial conditions for the system that all lead to the same long-term behaviour.

== Mathematical isochron ==
=== An introductory example ===
Consider the ordinary differential equation for a solution $y(t)$ evolving in time:

$$\frac{d^2y}{dt^2} + \frac{dy}{dt} = 1$$

This ordinary differential equation (ODE) needs two initial conditions at, say, time $t=0$. Denote the initial conditions by $y(0)=y_0$ and $dy/dt(0)=y'_0$ where $y_0$ and $y'_0$ are some parameters. The following argument shows that the isochrons for this system are here the straight lines $y_0+y'_0=\mbox{constant}$.

The general solution of the above ODE is

$$y=t+A+B\exp(-t)$$

Now, as time increases, $t\to\infty$, the exponential terms decays very quickly to zero (exponential decay). Thus all solutions of the ODE quickly approach $y\to t+A$. That is, all solutions with the same $A$ have the same long term evolution. The exponential decay of the $B\exp(-t)$ term brings together a host of solutions to share the same long term evolution. Find the isochrons by answering which initial conditions have the same $A$.

At the initial time $t=0$ we have $y_0=A+B$ and $y'_0=1-B$. Algebraically eliminate the immaterial constant $B$ from these two equations to deduce that all initial conditions $y_0+y'_0=1+A$ have the same $A$, hence the same long term evolution, and hence form an isochron.

=== Accurate forecasting requires isochrons ===
Let's turn to a more interesting application of the notion of isochrons. Isochrons arise when trying to forecast predictions from models of dynamical systems. Consider the toy system of two coupled ordinary differential equations

$$\frac{dx}{dt} = -xy \text{ and } \frac{dy}{dt} = -y+x^2 - 2y^2$$

A marvellous mathematical trick is the normal form (dynamical systems) transformation. Here the coordinate transformation near the origin

$$x=X+XY+\cdots \text{ and } y=Y+2Y^2+X^2+\cdots$$

to new variables $(X,Y)$ transforms the dynamics to the separated form

$$\frac{dX}{dt} = -X^3+ \cdots \text{ and } \frac{dY}{dt} = (-1-2X^2+\cdots)Y$$

Hence, near the origin, $Y$ decays to zero exponentially quickly as its equation is $dY/dt= (\text{negative})Y$. So the long term evolution is determined solely by $X$: the $X$ equation is the model.

Let us use the $X$ equation to predict the future. Given some initial values $(x_0,y_0)$ of the original variables: what initial value should we use for $X(0)$? Answer: the $X_0$ that has the same long term evolution. In the normal form above, $X$ evolves independently of $Y$. So all initial conditions with the same $X$, but different $Y$, have the same long term evolution. Fix $X$ and vary $Y$ gives the curving isochrons in the $(x,y)$ plane. For example, very near the origin the isochrons of the above system are approximately the lines $x-Xy=X-X^3$. Find which isochron the initial values $(x_0,y_0)$ lie on: that isochron is characterised by some $X_0$; the initial condition that gives the correct forecast from the model for all time is then $X(0)=X_0$.

You may find such normal form transformations for relatively simple systems of ordinary differential equations, both deterministic and stochastic, via an interactive web site.
