= Nicholas Range (Antarctic) =

Mountain range in Antarctica

Highest point
- Coordinates: 66°40′S 55°37′E

Geography
- Continent: Antarctica
- Region: East Antarctica

Nicholas Range is a range of mountains in the Antarctic. The range is situated 46 km southwest of Magnet Bay in Kemp Land. They were discovered on 12 January 1930 as part of the British Australian and New Zealand Antarctic Research Expedition under Douglas Mawson and were named after G.R. Nicholas of Melbourne, a patron of the expedition.
