= Sydney Kirkby (explorer) =

Australian surveyor and explorer (1933–2024)

- Born: 13 June 1933; Perth, Western Australia, Australia
- Died: 7 July 2024 (aged 91); Nambour, Queensland, Australia
- Occupations: Surveyor; explorer
- Known for: Exploration of Australian Antarctic Territory. Mapping surveys and senior management in Australia.

Sydney Lorrimar Kirkby (13 June 1933 – 7 July 2024) was an Australian surveyor and Antarctic explorer.

== Life and career ==
Syd Kirkby was first appointed Surveyor at Mawson Station for 1956, the third year of ANARE operations in Antarctica.

Syd Kirkby was Surveyor and/or Station Leader of the ANARE 16-month wintering party at Mawson Station for three years: 1956–57, 1960–61, 1980-81. Additionally, he was a member of the summer operations team for four years: 1961–62, 1962–63, 1964–65 and 1979-80.

Kirkby's many accomplishments in Antarctica include establishment of the easternmost, westernmost, and southernmost astrofixes in Australian Antarctic Territory. During his first expedition (1956–57), he was the first man to venture into the Prince Charles Mountains with sled dogs. In the autumn of 1960, he and his team journeyed 400 kilometres through Enderby Land from the Napier Mountains to Mawson station. Between 1961 and 1965, he surveyed more Antarctic territory than any other explorer. His contributions have made a significant impact on the fields of regional geochronology, petrology, tectonics geology, orogeny, glaciology, geomagnetism, and paleomagnetism.

In 1959, Kirkby joined the Commonwealth Government Division of National Mapping based in Melbourne. From 1961 he undertook extensive mapping control surveys in remote areas of Australia. In 1966 Kirby became Senior Surveyor in charge of National Mapping's airborne distance measuring (Aerodist) program. Later he became a Supervising Surveyor. Between 1976 and 1984 Kirkby was the Assistant Director in charge of National Mapping's Melbourne office.

Kirkby died in Nambour, Queensland on 7 July 2024, at the age of 91.

== Awards and recognition ==
Many geographical features in and around Australian Antarctic Territory have been named for Syd Kirkby. Some of these are:

- Mount Kirkby in the Porthos Range of the Prince Charles Mountains
- Kirkby Head on Tange Promontory in Enderby Land, near the Russian Molodezhnaya Station
- Kirkby Shoal in Newcomb Bay, near Casey Station, Shirley Island, Windmill Islands
- Kirkby Glacier on the eastern boundary of Australian Antarctic Territory in the Trans Antarctic Mountains, Oates Land

Other awards and recognition include:

- the Polar Medal (1958)
- Member of the Order of the British Empire (1966)
- the Gold Medal of the Australian Geographic Society as Adventurer of the Year (1997)
- nominated by the newspaper The Australian as one of the ten greatest Australian adventurers of the 20th century (1999)
- John Park Thomson (Founder’s) Medal, the Royal Geographical Society of Australasia, Queensland Branch (2002)
- Officer of the Order of Australia (2018)
- Phillip Law Medal (ANARE Club) (2020)
