= Mount Storegutt =

Mountain in Enderby Land, Antarctica

Mount Storegutt (66°53′S 55°27′E) is a mountain, 1,465 m, standing 28 nautical miles (50 km) west of Edward VIII Bay and 10 nautical miles (18 km) south of Jennings Bluff It was mapped by Norwegian cartographers from aerial photos taken by the Lars Christensen Expedition of 1936–37 and was named Storegutt (big boy).
