= Mawson Station =

- Antarctic station
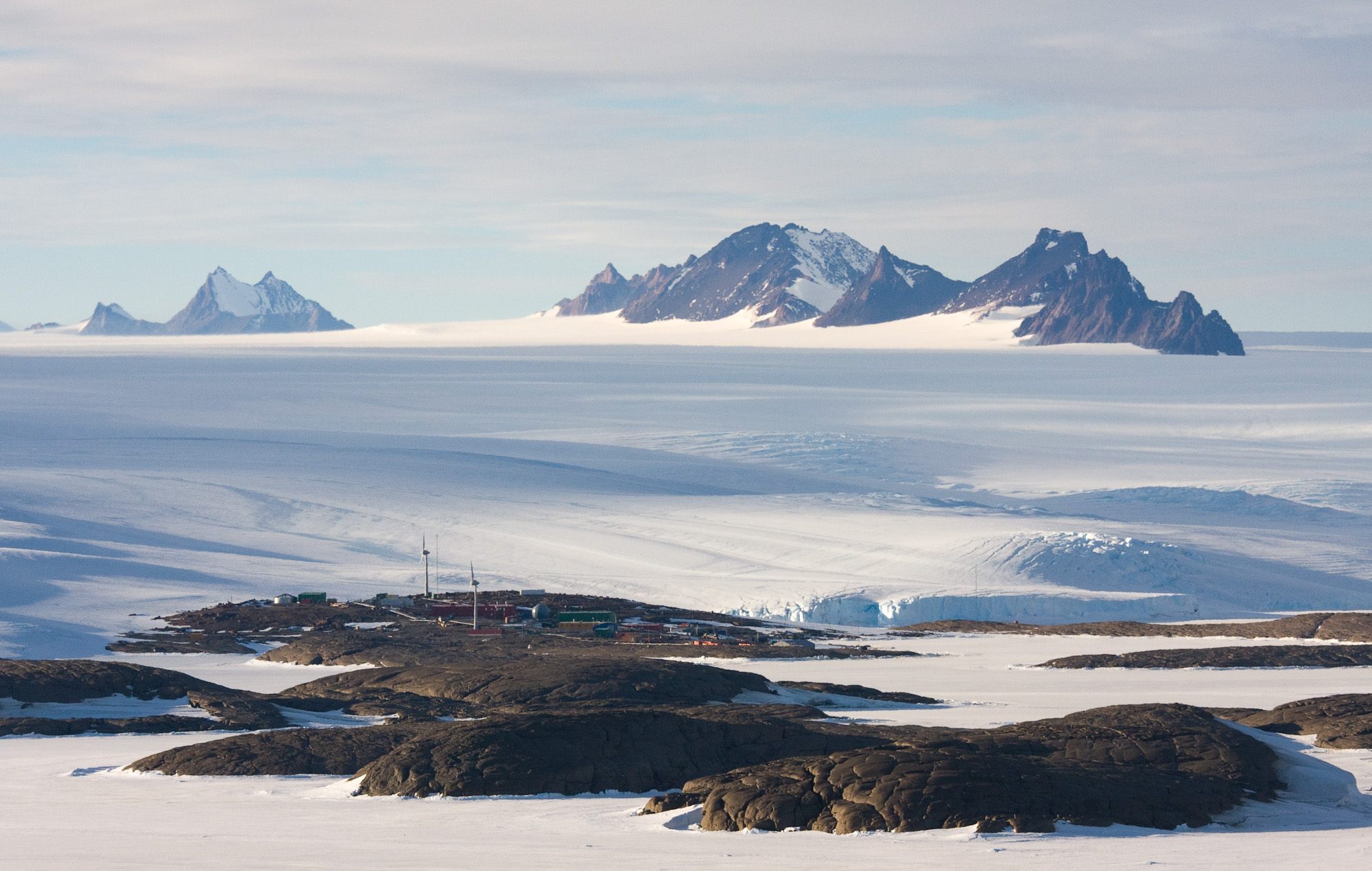
- Mawson Station looking toward the David Range

- Location of Mawson Station in Antarctica
- Coordinates: 67°36′10″S 62°52′25″E
- Country: Australia
- Location in Antarctica: Australian Antarctic Territory
- Subdivision: Holme Bay; Mac Robertson Land; East Antarctica
- Administered by: Australian Antarctic Division
- Established: 13 February 1954
- Named after: Sir Douglas Mawson
- Elevation: 15 m (49 ft)

Population (2017)
  - Summer: 53
  - Winter: 15
- Time zone: UTC+5 (MAWT)
- UN/LOCODE: AQ MAW
- Type: All-year round
- Period: Annual
- Status: Operational
- Activities: List: Cosmic ray detection; Geomagnetism; Biology
- Facilities: List: Accommodation with private bedrooms and shared bathrooms; Large dining room (or mess); Several communal sitting areas; A range of amenities including medical and laundry facilities; A theatrette; Library; Small spa and sauna; Climbing wall; Green Store
- Website: aad.gov.au

Mawson Station, commonly called Mawson, is one of three permanent bases and research outposts in Antarctica maintained by the Australian Antarctic Division (AAD). Mawson Station lies in Holme Bay in Mac. Robertson Land, East Antarctica in the Australian Antarctic Territory, a sector of Antarctica claimed by Australia as an external territory. Established in 1954, Mawson is Australia's oldest Antarctic station and the oldest continuously inhabited Antarctic station south of the Antarctic Circle. It houses approximately 20 personnel over the winter season and up to 53 in summer.

Mawson was named in honour of the Australian Antarctic explorer Sir Douglas Mawson.

Mawson was listed on the Register of the National Estate in 2001 and listed on the Commonwealth Heritage List on 22 June 2004, reflecting the post-World War Two revival of Australia's scientific research and territorial interests in Antarctica.

== Purpose ==
Mawson Station is an active base for scientific research programs including an underground cosmic ray detector, various long-term meteorological aeronomy and geomagnetic studies, as well as ongoing conservation biology studies, in particular of nearby Auster rookery, a breeding ground for emperor penguins and Adélie penguins.

== History ==
In 1946, the Minister for External Affairs, H.V. Evatt indicated his support for a proposal by Douglas Mawson for the establishment of a permanent Australian base in Antarctica. It was another seven years before a suitable ship, the Kista Dan could be chartered to set up facilities on the southern continent.

The station site was chosen in 1953 by Phillip Law, the first director of the AAD, who drew aerial photographs taken during the U.S. Operation Highjump (OpHjp) of 1946-1947 to select the site for its large natural harbour (Horseshoe Harbour) and permanently exposed rock for building. The station was built during 1954. Some of the small pre-fabricated huts used in the first years remain on the station, but these are overshadowed by large steel-framed modular buildings dating from a major rebuilding program that started in the late 1970s.

By 1959, the facilities at Mawson Station had expanded significantly. Personnel at that time included 6 scientists, 4 technicians, 2 pilots, 2 weather observers, and 10 others. Scientific disciplines represented included cartography, geology and geomagnetism, glaciology, seismology, ionospheric and auroral physics, meteorology, and physiology. Vehicles included 2 de Havilland Canada DHC-2 Beaver aircraft, 3 Caterpillar D4 tractors, 1 TEA-20 Ferguson, and 1 Sno-Cat.

== Geography ==
Mawson Station is located at Holme Bay in Mac Robertson Land, East Antarctica, named in January 1930 by Sir Douglas Mawson during the first British Australian and New Zealand Antarctic Research Expedition (BANZARE) voyage, aboard Discovery. It is in a region which Mawson proclaimed as British territory on several occasions in 1930 and 1931 (including at Proclamation Island, Scullin Monolith and Cape Bruce), and later became Australian Antarctic Territory.

Some notable geographic features in the region include the Framnes Mountains, which form the dramatic backdrop to Mawson Station. The Framnes Mountains were named in the 1930s by Norwegian explorers financed by the shipowner and whaling magnate Lars Christensen.

== Climate ==
Mawson Station experiences a Polar climate:

Climate data for Mawson Station
Month	Jan	Feb	Mar	Apr	May	Jun	Jul	Aug	Sep	Oct	Nov	Dec	Year
Record high °C (°F)	10.6 (51.1)	8.0 (46.4)	4.0 (39.2)	0.0 (32.0)	0.4 (32.7)	0.7 (33.3)	5.0 (41.0)	6.7 (44.1)	0.7 (33.3)	1.5 (34.7)	8.2 (46.8)	9.3 (48.7)	10.6 (51.1)
Mean daily maximum °C (°F)	2.5 (36.5)	−1.4 (29.5)	−7.2 (19.0)	−11.8 (10.8)	−13.5 (7.7)	−13.5 (7.7)	−15.0 (5.0)	−15.5 (4.1)	−14.2 (6.4)	−9.9 (14.2)	−2.6 (27.3)	2.0 (35.6)	−8.3 (17.1)
Mean daily minimum °C (°F)	−2.7 (27.1)	−7.3 (18.9)	−13.3 (8.1)	−17.4 (0.7)	−19.3 (−2.7)	−19.6 (−3.3)	−21.0 (−5.8)	−21.7 (−7.1)	−20.5 (−4.9)	−16.4 (2.5)	−8.8 (16.2)	−3.3 (26.1)	−14.3 (6.3)
Record low °C (°F)	−10.0 (14.0)	−17.3 (0.9)	−26.3 (−15.3)	−33.3 (−27.9)	−34.5 (−30.1)	−34.0 (−29.2)	−36.0 (−32.8)	−35.9 (−32.6)	−35.8 (−32.4)	−29.0 (−20.2)	−20.0 (−4.0)	−11.7 (10.9)	−36.0 (−32.8)
Mean monthly sunshine hours	257.3	220.4	167.4	114.0	49.6	0.0	18.6	93.0	150.0	235.6	258.0	272.8	1,836.7
Source: Bureau of Meteorology

== Research ==
During March and April 1960, an ANARE survey party from Mawson Station carried out a barometric mapping control traverse along the route of a 242 kilometres (150 mi) dog sledge journey from Cape Batterbee through the Napier Mountains to Martin Island in Edward VIII Bay. The members of this survey party — led by Syd Kirkby — were the first people to set foot in the Napier Mountains. The highest peak of this small range — Mount Elkins — was identified and named at this time for Terence James Elkins. Many other terrain features were mapped, visited or named as a result of this expedition, including Armstrong Peak, Bird Ridge, Mount Griffiths, Newman Nunataks, Wilkinson Peaks, and the Young Nunataks.

In 2018, astronaut and academic Jay C. Buckey conducted research using virtual reality, at the Australian Antarctic Division’s Mawson Station, wherein the expeditioners used VR headsets to view Australian beach scenes, European nature scenes, and North American nature scenes of forests and urban environments, which were different from the isolation of the whiteness and silence of Antarctica. The research will inform psychological techniques to support long-duration spaceflight such as for astronauts going to Mars.

== Logistics ==
Mawson is 5,475 km (3,402 mi) from Hobart, the AAD's main supply hub for Antarctic operations, and 5,201 km (3,232 mi) from Fremantle.

=== Communications ===
Mawson's infrastructure includes an ANARESAT satellite antenna Earth station for communication.

=== Air transport ===
In early summer when sea ice conditions are most favourable, a ski landing area (SLA) is constructed adjacent to Mawson. As sea ice conditions progressively worsen over summer, operations are moved to Rumdoodle SLA, a field camp on the inland ice plateau 10 km from Mawson.

Rumdoodle SLA has been in use since the 1950s, and the glacier surface requires annual inspection and preparation prior to use. It is accessible from Mawson by Hägglunds ground vehicles.

=== Sea transport ===
Mawson Station is accessible by sea for only a short period each austral summer, between February and March. It has a deep, sheltered natural harbour and is ice-free in February. A direct voyage from Hobart to Mawson takes about 10–12 days, due to variable weather and sea-ice conditions. The approach to Horseshoe Harbour is through the Mawson Corridor and the Entrance Shoal.

Between 1953 and 1987, Mawson was supplied by the ice-strengthened polar research vessels, including Kista Dan, Magga Dan, Thala Dan, and Nella Dan. This period came to an end when Nella Dan ran aground and sank at Macquarie Island on 3 December 1987.

=== Wind power ===
Mawson is the only Antarctic station to use wind generators designed to take advantage of the fierce katabatic winds. Two 300 kW wind turbines were installed in 2003, but one failed in 2017.

== See also ==
- List of Antarctic research stations
- List of Antarctic field camps
- Marble Rock (Antarctica)
- Mawson Corridor
