= Edward VIII Plateau =

Peninsula in Antarctica

The Edward VIII Plateau is a dome-shaped, ice-covered peninsula between Magnet Bay and Edward VIII Bay in Antarctica. It was probably seen by personnel on the RRS William Scoresby in 1936, and mapped from aerial photos taken by the Lars Christensen Expedition, 1936–1937, and named Gulfplataet (the gulf plateau). It was renamed "King Edward Plateau" by ANCA, but the form Edward VIII Plateau has been approved by the Advisory Committee on Antarctic Names (US-ACAN) to be consistent with the names of nearby Edward VIII Bay and Ice Shelf.

== Styles bluff ==
Styles bluff (66°41′S 57°18′E) is a light-colored rock bluff at the southeast side of Edward VIII Plateau, rising out of the sea 1 nautical mile (1.9 km) north of Cape Gotley. Mapped by Norwegian cartographers from aerial photos taken by the Lars Christensen Expedition, 1936–1937. First visited in February 1960 by an Australian National Antarctic Research Expeditions (ANARE) party led by D. F. Styles, Asst. Director, Antarctic Division, Melbourne, for whom this feature was named.
