= Edward VIII Ice Shelf =

Ice shelf in Antarctica

Coordinates: 66°50′S 56°33′E

Location in Antarctica

Edward VIII Ice Shelf is an ice shelf occupying the head of Edward VIII Bay in Antarctica. The northern part of this feature was called Innviksletta (the inner bay plain) by Norwegian cartographers, who mapped it from aerial photos taken by the Lars Christensen Expedition in 1936–37. The area was first visited in 1954 by an ANARE (Australian National Antarctic Research Expeditions) sledge party. The entire ice shelf was then mapped and named in association with Edward VIII Bay.

== See also ==
- List of glaciers and ice shelves in Antarctica
