= Magnet Bay =

Bay in Antarctica

Coordinates: 66°22′S 56°20′E

Magnet Bay is a shallow coastal indentation, 13 kilometres (7 nmi) wide and receding only 3.7 kilometres (2 nmi), located 17 kilometres (9 nmi) west of Cape Davis at the northwest side of Edward VIII Plateau in Antarctica.

The British Australian New Zealand Antarctic Research Expedition, 1929–31, under Mawson, originally charted Magnet Bay as a larger bay extending from Cape Davis to Cape Borley, naming it after the vessel Magnet, in which Peter Kemp first sighted land in this vicinity in 1833. Later exploration, particularly that of the Lars Christensen Expedition, 1936–37, has shown the bay to be less extensive.
