= Cape Batterbee =

Headland in Enderby Land, Antarctica

Coordinates: 65°51′S 53°48′E

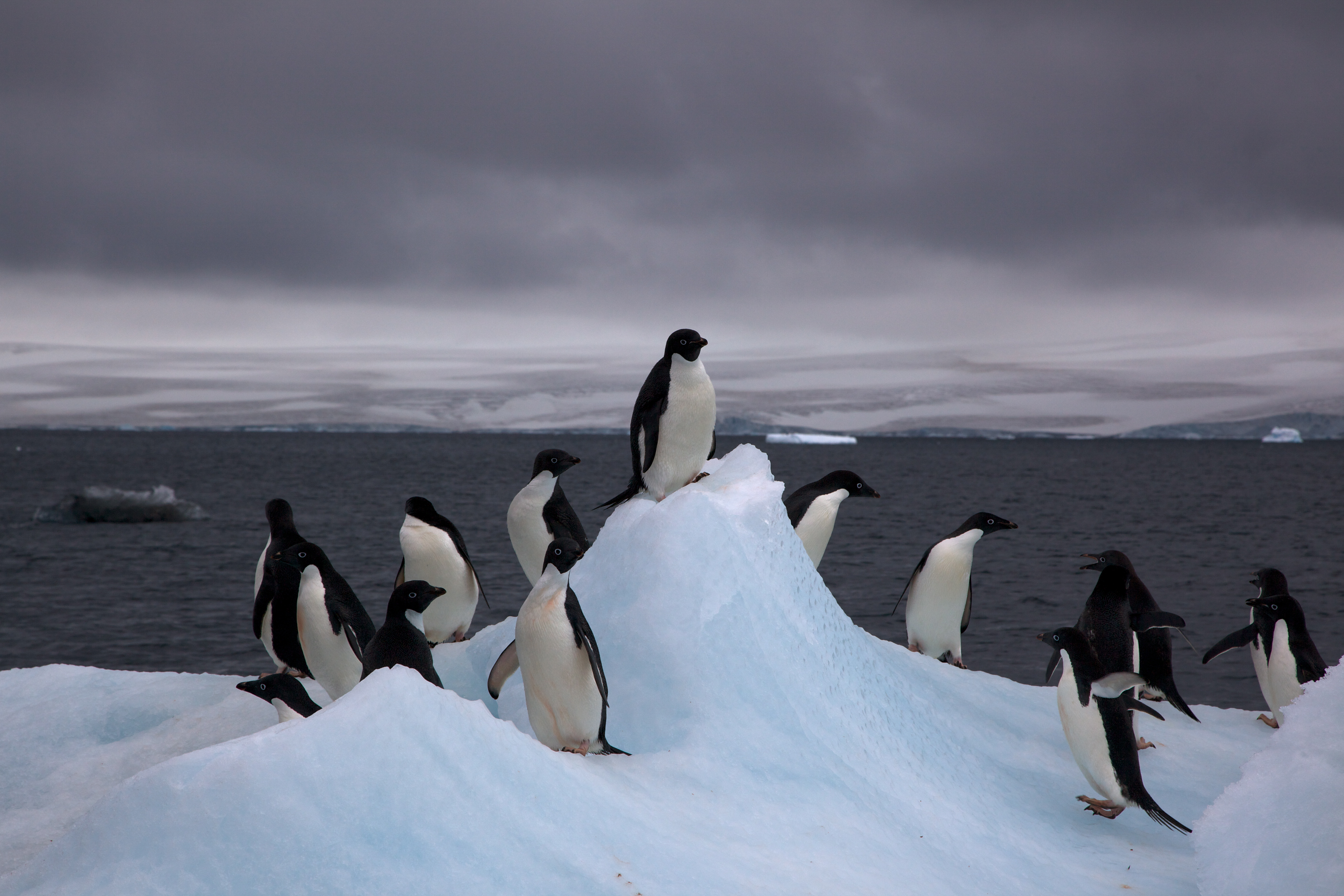
Adélie penguins breed in the IBA

Cape Batterbee is a small, rocky point on the coast, the most northerly cape of Enderby Land. It is located 92 km north of Mount Elkins.

== Discovery and naming ==
Cape Batterbee was discovered by BANZARE (1929–31) on 13 January 1930. Named by Sir Douglas Mawson after Sir Henry Fagg Batterbee, Assistant Secretary of the Dominions Office, London, at the time of the expedition.

== Important Bird Area ==
A 151 ha site comprising the cape, a nearby offshore island and the intervening sea ice has been identified as an Important Bird Area (IBA) by BirdLife International because it supports some 31,000 breeding pairs of Adélie penguins (as estimated from 2011 satellite imagery).

== See also ==
- Aagaard Islands, group of small islands to the west of Cape Batterbee
- History of Antarctica
- List of Antarctic expeditions
