= East Antarctica =

Part of Antarctica that lies within the Eastern Hemisphere

Coordinates: 80°S 80°E

Map of Antarctica with Eastern Antarctica seen to the right.

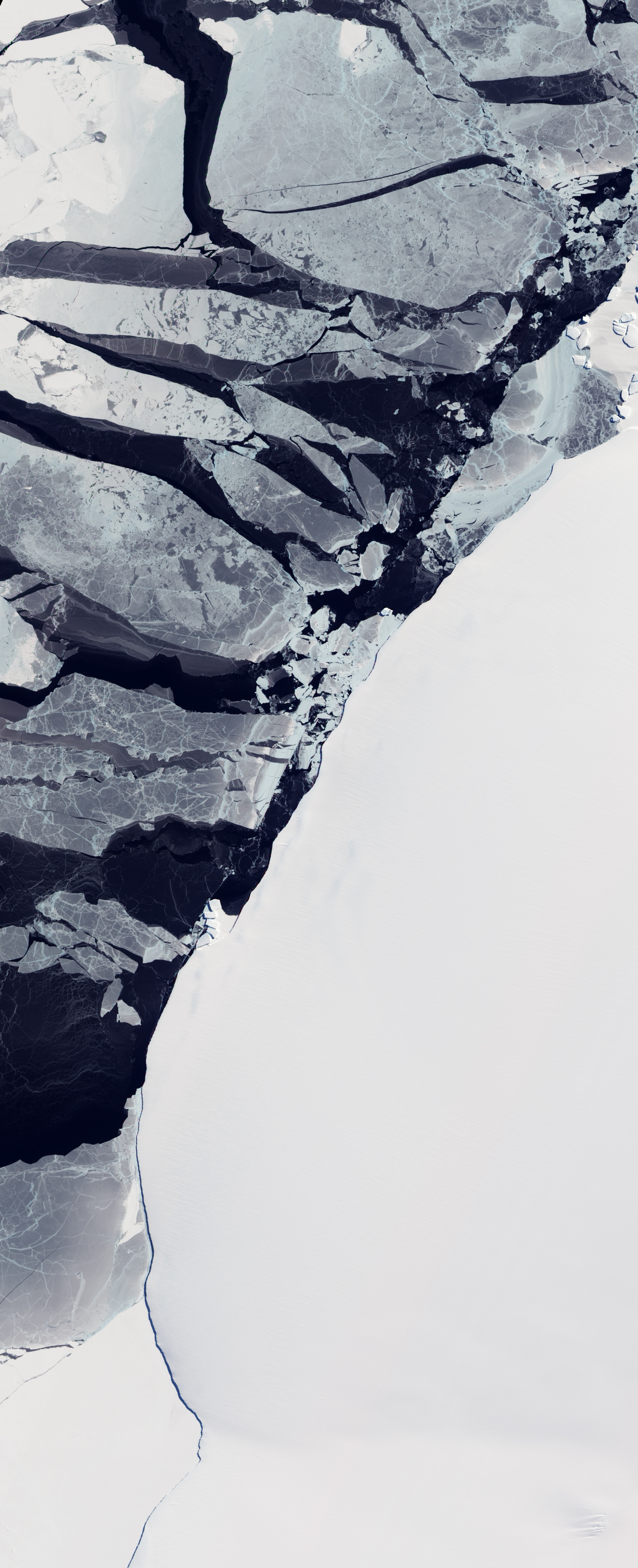
Image of a variety of ice types off the coast of East Antarctica.

East Antarctica, also called Greater Antarctica, constitutes the majority (two-thirds) of the Antarctic continent, lying primarily in the Eastern Hemisphere south of the Indian Ocean, and separated from West Antarctica by the Transantarctic Mountains. It is generally greater in elevation than West Antarctica, and includes the Gamburtsev Mountain Range in the center. The geographic South Pole is located within East Antarctica.

Apart from small areas of the coast, East Antarctica is permanently covered by ice and it has relatively low biodiversity, with only a small number of species of terrestrial plants, animals, algae, and lichens. The coasts are the breeding ground for various seabirds and penguins, and the leopard seal, Weddell seal, elephant seal, crabeater seal and Ross seal breed on the surrounding pack ice in summer.

== Location and description ==
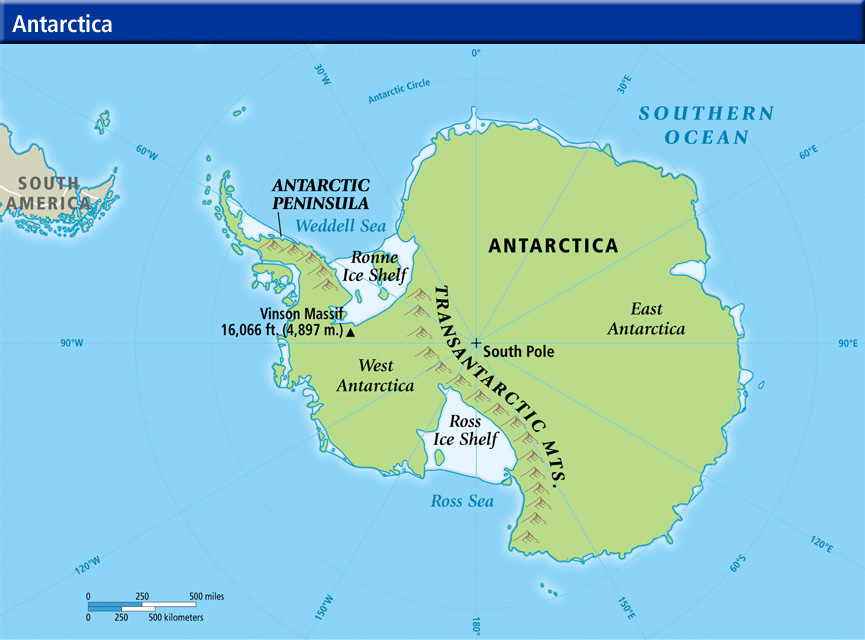
Geographical map of Antarctica.

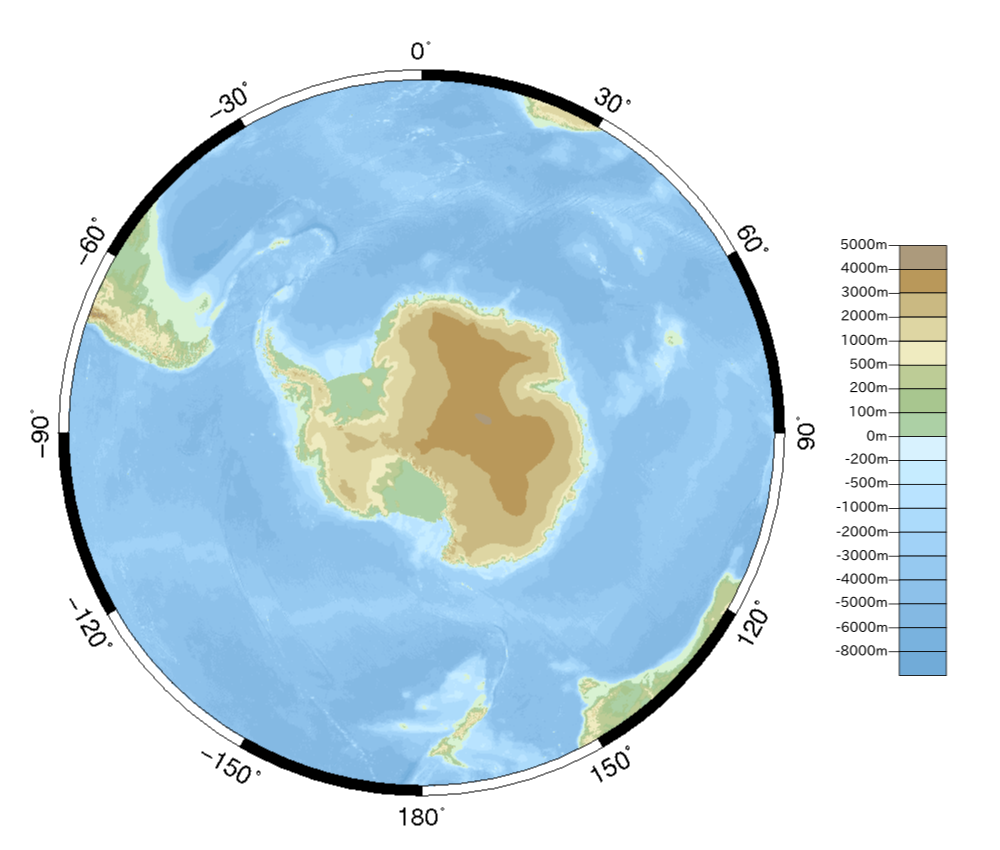
Map of Antarctica with surrounding continents and islands.

Almost completely covered in thick, permanent ice, East Antarctica comprises Coats Land, Queen Maud Land, Enderby Land, Kemp Land, Mac. Robertson Land, Princess Elizabeth Land, Wilhelm II Land, Queen Mary Land, Wilkes Land, Adélie Land, George V Land, Oates Land and Victoria Land. All but a small portion of this region lies within the Eastern Hemisphere, a fact that has suggested the name. The name has been in existence for more than 110 years (Balch, 1902; Nordenskjöld, 1904), but its greatest use followed the International Geophysical Year (1957–58) and explorations disclosing that the Transantarctic Mountains provide a useful regional separation of East Antarctica and West Antarctica. The name was approved in the United States by the Advisory Committee on Antarctic Names (US-ACAN) in 1962. East Antarctica is generally higher than West Antarctica, and is considered the coldest place on Earth.

The subglacial Gamburtsev Mountain Range, about the size of the European Alps, in the center of East Antarctica, are believed to have been the nucleation site for the East Antarctic Ice Sheet, just underneath Dome A.

== Flora and fauna ==
Apart from a few small areas, East Antarctica is entirely covered with ice. The areas that remain free of ice (Antarctic oases)—including the McMurdo Dry Valleys—constitute a tundra-type biodiversity region known as Maudlandia Antarctic Desert, after Queen Maud Land. The only flora consists of lichens, moss, and algae that cling to rocks.

The coasts are home to seabirds, penguins, and seals, which feed in the surrounding ocean.

Seabirds of the coast include southern fulmar (Fulmarus glacialoides), the scavenging southern giant petrel (Macronectes giganteus), Cape petrel (Daption capense), snow petrel (Pagodroma nivea), the small Wilson's storm-petrel (Oceanites oceanicus), the large south polar skua (Catharacta maccormicki), and Antarctic petrel (Thalassoica antarctica).

The seals of the Antarctic Ocean include leopard seal (Hydrurga leptonyx), Weddell seal (Leptonychotes weddellii), the huge southern elephant seal (Mirounga leonina), crabeater seal (Lobodon carcinophagus) and Ross seal (Ommatophoca rossii).

There are no large land animals but bacteria, nematodes, springtails, mites, and midges live on the mosses and lichens.

=== Gallery ===
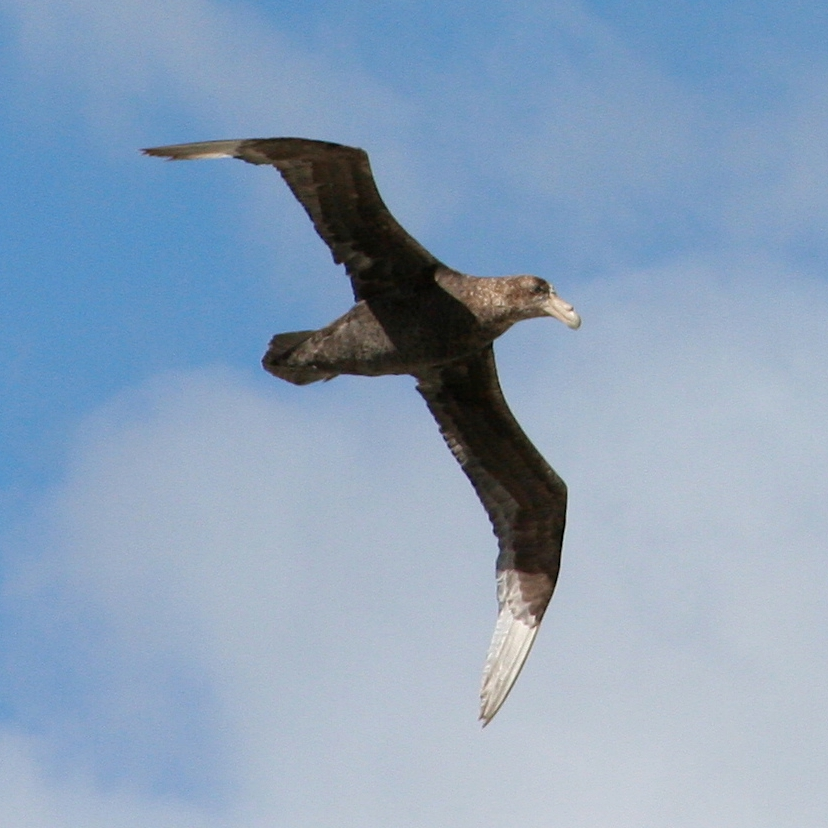
Macronectes giganteus

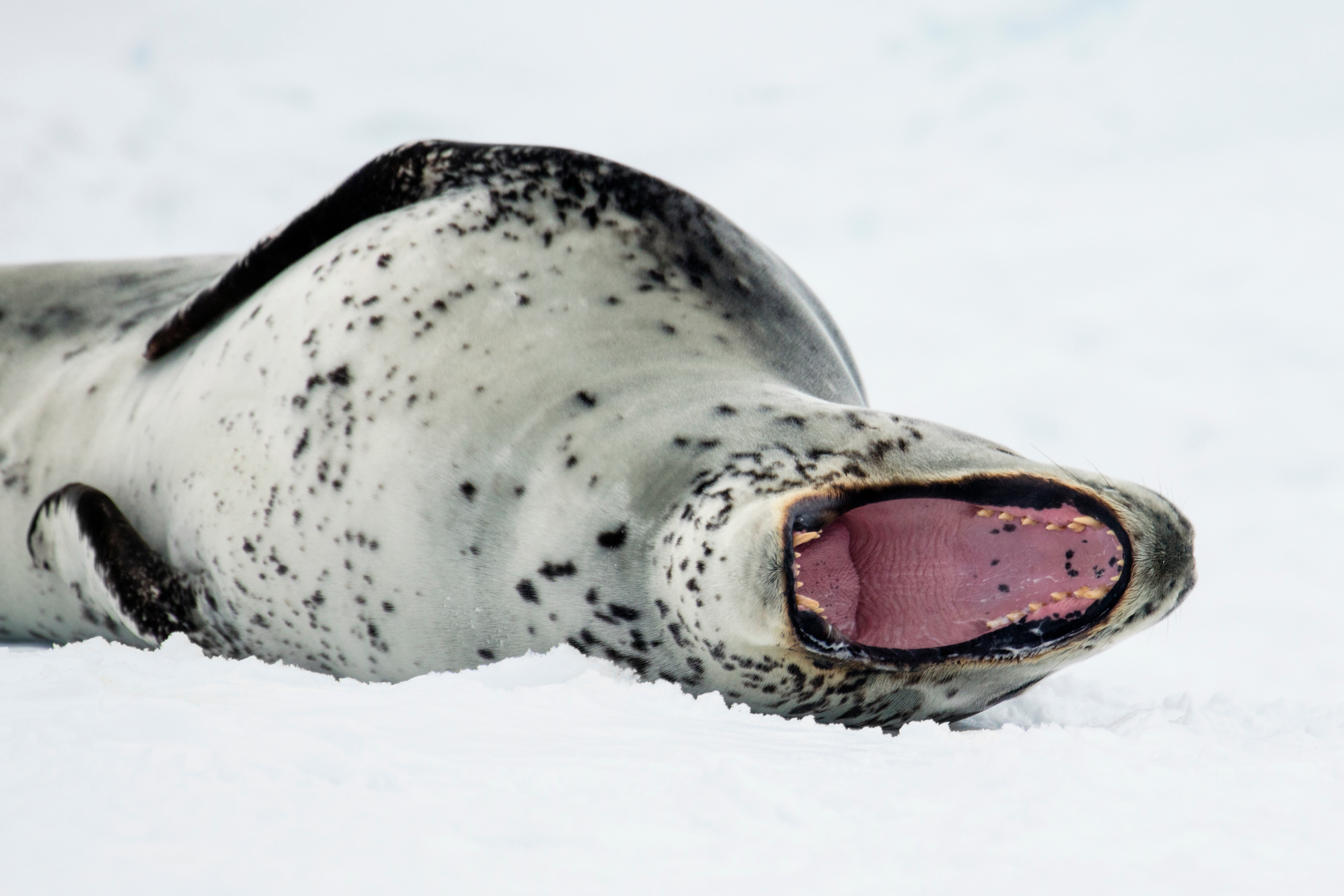
Hydrurga leptonyx

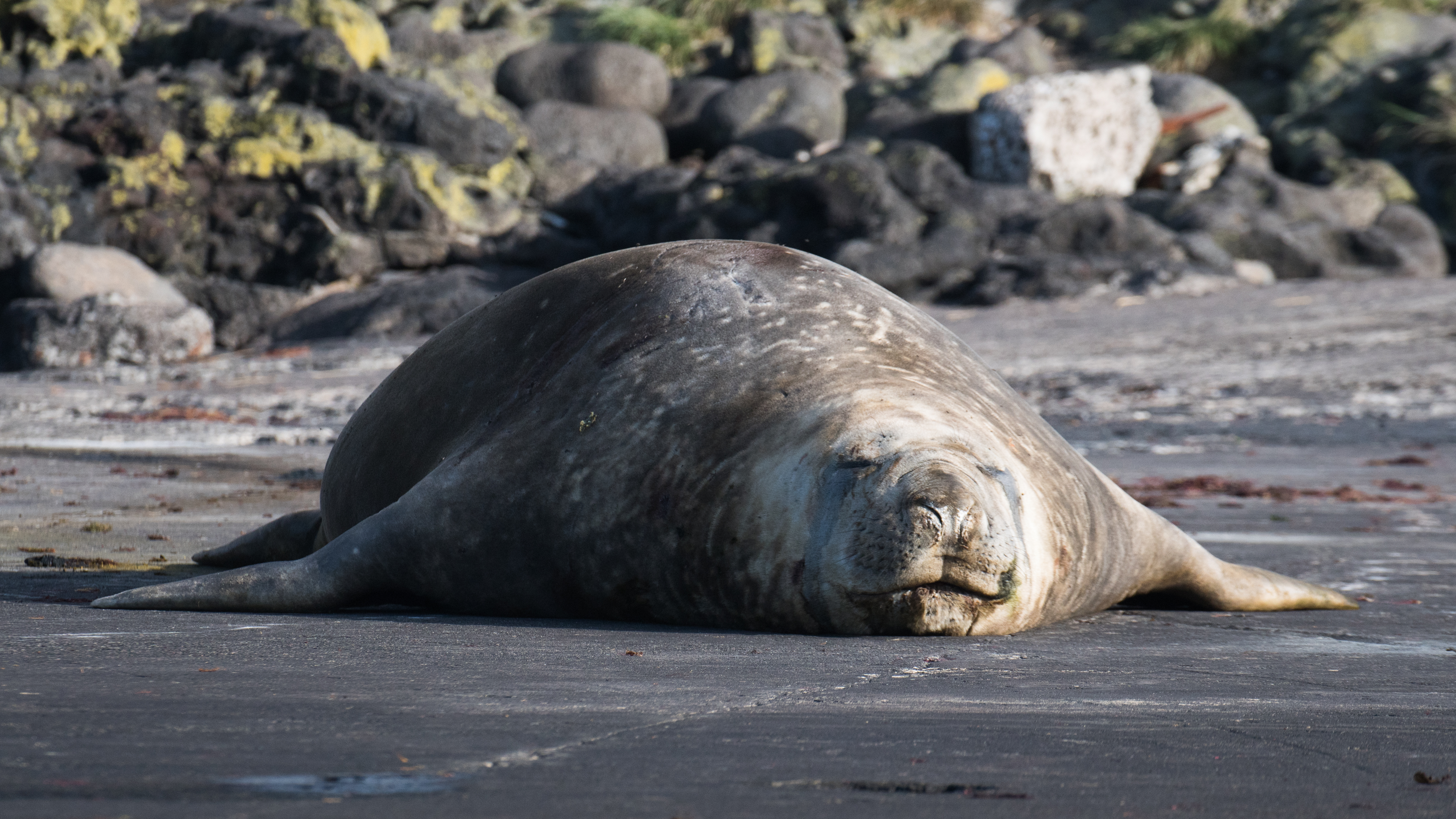
Mirounga leonina

== Threats and preservation ==
The remote and extremely cold bulk of Antarctica remains almost entirely untouched by human intervention. The area is protected by the Antarctic Treaty System which bans industrial development, waste disposal and nuclear testing, while the Barwick Valley, one of the Dry Valleys, Mount Rittmann, and Cryptogam Ridge on Mount Melbourne are specially protected areas for their undisturbed plant life.

== See also ==
- East Antarctic craton
- Polar plateau
