= Edward VIII Bay =

Bay in Antarctica

Coordinates: 66°50′S 57°0′E

Edward VIII Bay is a bay about 32 kilometres (20 mi) in extent, located between Edward VIII Plateau (a dome-shaped, ice-covered peninsula near Magnet Bay) and the Øygarden Group of islands in Antarctica. The head of the bay is occupied by the Edward VIII Ice Shelf. The bay was discovered in 1936 by Discovery Investigations personnel on the RRS William Scoresby, and named for Edward VIII, then King of the United Kingdom.

Kvarsnes Foreland is a prominent, rocky foreland projecting into the south side of Edward VIII Bay close west of the Øygarden Group. Kvarsnes Bay is a small bay at the southwest side of Kvarsnes Foreland, and is named in association with it. Rund Bay ("Round Bay") is a small bay indenting the south shore of Edward VIII Bay immediately east of Kvarsnes Foreland. These features were mapped and named by Norwegian cartographers from aerial photographs taken by the Lars Christensen Expedition, 1936–37.
