= Enderby Land =

Projecting landmass of Antarctica

Location of Enderby Land (red), Australian Antarctic Territory in Antarctica

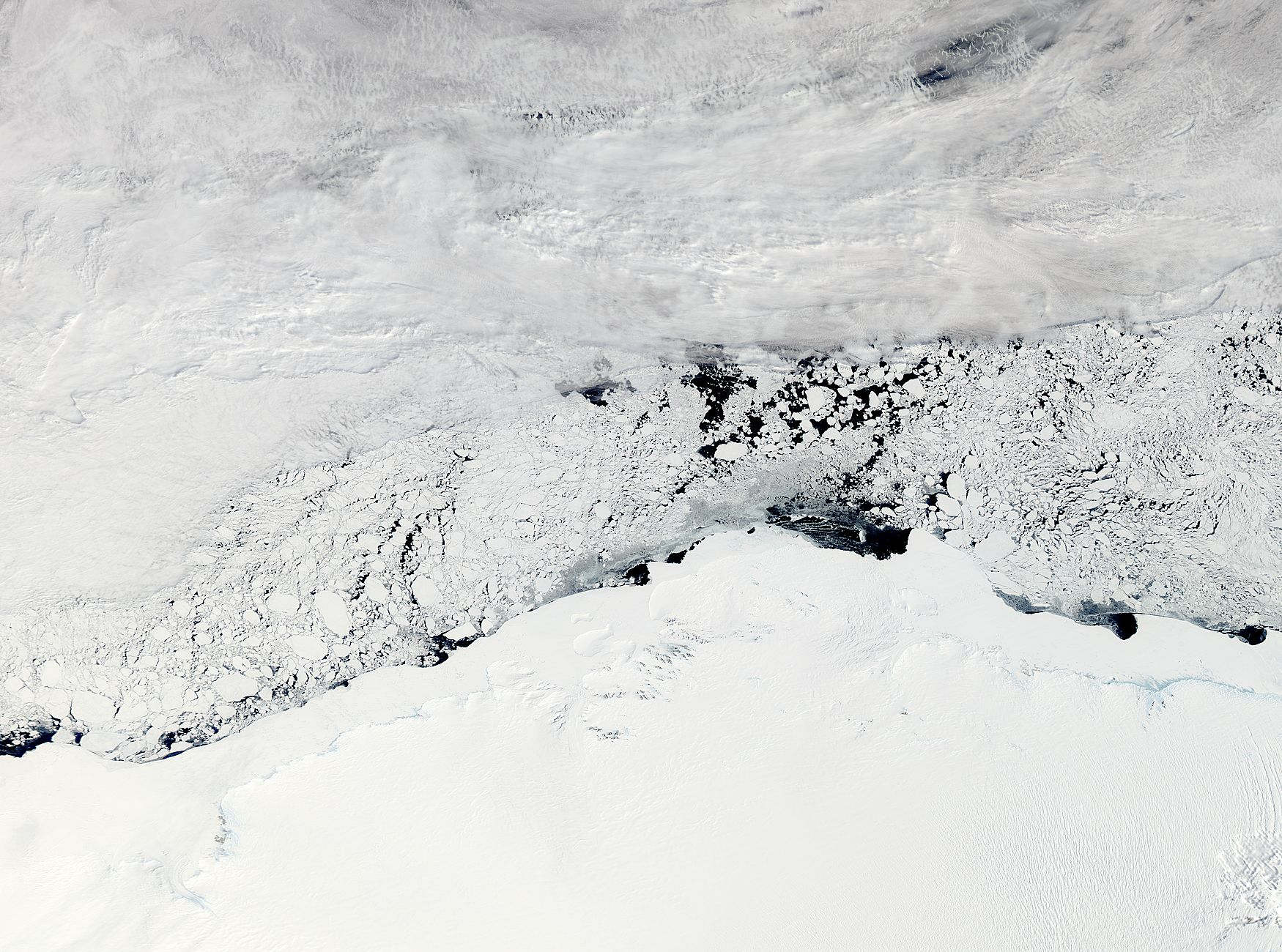
Enderby Land, Antarctica. NASA MODIS image, 2011

Enderby Land is a projecting landmass of Antarctica. Its shore extends from Shinnan Glacier at about 67°55′S 44°38′E to William Scoresby Bay at 67°24′S 59°34′E, approximately 1/24 of the earth's longitude. It was first documented in western and eastern literature in February 1831 by John Biscoe aboard the whaling brig Tula, and named after the Enderby Brothers of London, the ship's owners who encouraged their captains to combine exploration with sealing.

== Nation state claims ==
The area of Enderby Land is part of the Australian Antarctic Territory.

== Features ==
Coastal features include Amundsen Bay, Casey Bay and Cape Monakov. Mountain ranges or sub-ranges being crests above pack ice (escarpments), are the Scott Mountains, the Tula Mountains, and the Napier Mountains. The highest peak is Mount Elkins at 2,300 metres (7,500 ft) Above Ordnance Datum (conventional sea level).

== See also ==
- Geology of Enderby Land
- Mawson Station
- History of Antarctica
- List of Antarctic expeditions
