= Edwards Island =

Edwards Island or Edwards Islands may refer to:

- Edwards Island (Western Australia), an island in Australia
- Edwards Island (Wisconsin), a river island in the United States
- Edwards Island (New Zealand), one of the Titi/Muttonbird Islands
- Edwards Islands (Canisteo Peninsula), an island group in Antarctica
- Edwards Islands (Enderby Land), an island group in Antarctica

== See also ==
- Edwards Islet (disambiguation)
