= Shirshov =

Shirshov may refer to:

People:

- Aleksandr Shirshov (born 1972), Russian Olympic fencer and coach
- Anatoly Illarionovich Shirshov (1921–1981), Soviet mathematician
- Nikolay Shirshov (born 1974), Uzbekistani football midfielder
- Pyotr Shirshov (1905–1953), Russian Soviet oceanographer, hydrobiologist, polar explorer, statesman, academician, hero of the Soviet Union (1938)

Geography:

- Shirshov Ridge, on the eastern border of the Commander Basin below the Kamchatka Peninsula
- Mount Shirshov, a small mountain 3 miles northeast of Mount Selwood in the Tula Mountains, Enderby Land
- Shirshov Institute of Oceanology in Moscow, the largest institute for ocean and earth science research in Russia

== See also ==
- Lyndon-Shirshov basis or Free Lie algebra, a Lie algebra without any imposed relations
