= Mount Morrison =

Mount Morrison may refer to one of five possible peaks in the United States:

Name	USGS link	State	County	USGS map	Coordinates	Elevation	
Mount Morrison		California	Mono	Convict Lake	37°33′41″N 118°51′27″W	12,241 ft	3,731 m
Mount Morrison		Colorado	Jefferson	Morrison	39°40′09″N 105°13′10″W	7,877 ft	2,401 m
Mount Morrison	n/a	Idaho	Custer	Elkhorn Creek	44°06′04″N 113°48′03″W	11,367 ft	3,465 m
Morrison Peak		Montana	Missoula	Potomac	46°55′30″N 113°32′55″W	5,627 ft	1,715 m
Morrison Mountain		Oklahoma	Cherokee	Thompson Corner	35°52′58″N 95°01′46″W	1,043 ft	318 m

It can also refer to:

- Mount Morrison (Yushan, 3952 m), the highest mountain in Taiwan.
- Mount Morrison (2765 m) in Banff National Park, Alberta, Canada.
- One of two mountains in Antarctica, in Enderby Land and Victoria Land.
