= Mount Lunde =

Mountain ridge in Enderby Land, Antarctica

Mount Lunde (66°58′S 50°28′E) is a mountain ridge close south of Mount Gleadell, in the western part of the Tula Mountains in Enderby Land, Antarctica. It was sighted by the Australian National Antarctic Research Expeditions Amundsen Bay party, under Ali Zaheer in October 1956, and was named by the Antarctic Names Committee of Australia for J. Lunde, a senior diesel mechanic at Wilkes Station in 1960.
