= Zdeněk Souček =

Czech-Australian doctor and arctic explorer

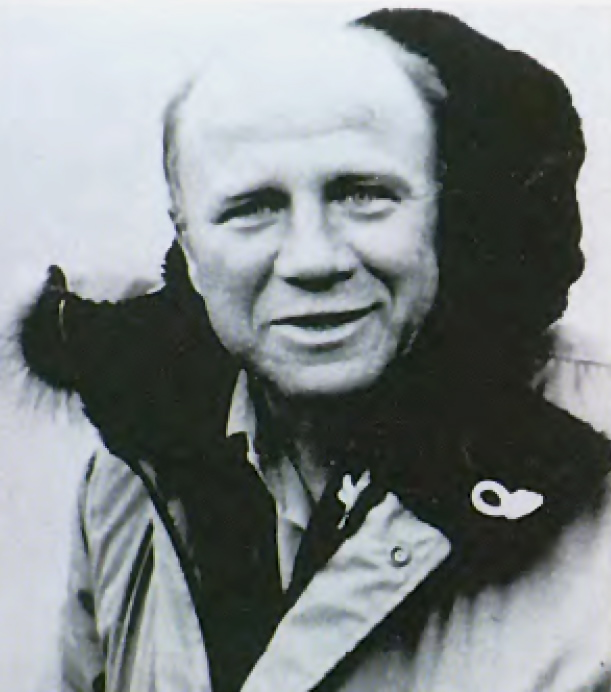
Souček in 1965

Zdeněk "Frank" Souček (9 September 1917 – 24 December 1967) was a Czech-Australian medical doctor, polar and tropics explorer and traveler.

== Life ==
Souček was born in Brno on 9 September 1917. He began studying medicine in Brno before the war interrupted his studies. He gained his doctorate in 1947 at Charles University in Prague. He started to work in Prachatice where he got to know his future wife. He emigrated to the West Germany in 1949 and one year later to Australia where he joined Australian National Antarctic Research Expeditions. He joined the 1952 Macquarie Island party as a medical officer. He worked on New Ireland during 1953–1959 providing tropical medicine and doing anthropology research. After his return to ANARE, he participated in 12 Antarctic expeditions serving mostly as a medical doctor. He studied the influence of extreme conditions on humans, and the gastrointestinal bacteria of polar birds and mammals. He worked mainly on Macquarie Island and at Wilkes Station.

He died of a heart attack on Macquarie Island on 24 December 1967. A cremation urn with his ashes is placed in Vodňany, Czech Republic.

== Places named after Souček ==
Several places are named after Zdeněk Souček:

- Soucek Bay on Macquarie Island
- Mount Soucek in Tula Mountains, Antarctica
- Soucek Ravine on Ardery Island
