= Mount Trail =

Mountain in Enderby Land, Antarctica

Mount Trail (67°12′S 50°51′E) is a mountain on the northeast side of Auster Glacier, at the head of Amundsen Bay in Enderby Land. It was plotted from air photos taken from ANARE (Australian National Antarctic Research Expeditions) aircraft in 1956 and was named by the Antarctic Names Committee of Australia (ANCA) for D.S. Trail, a geologist at Mawson Station in 1961.
