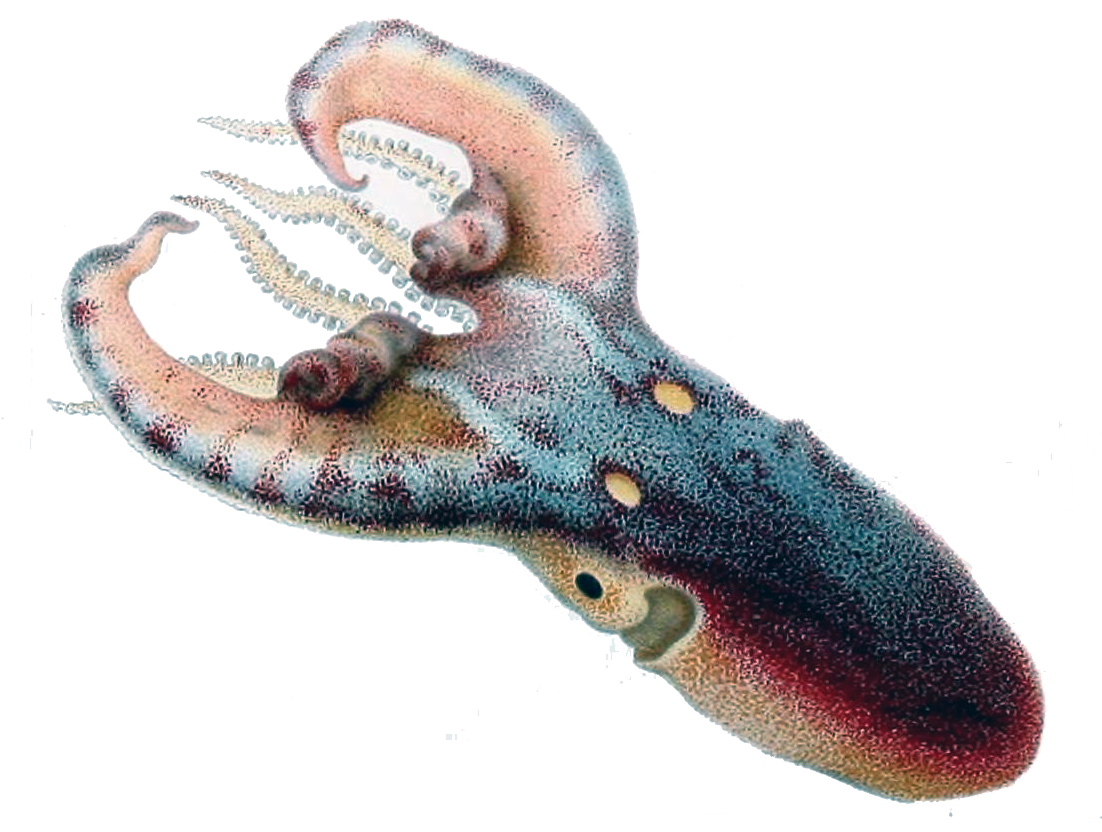

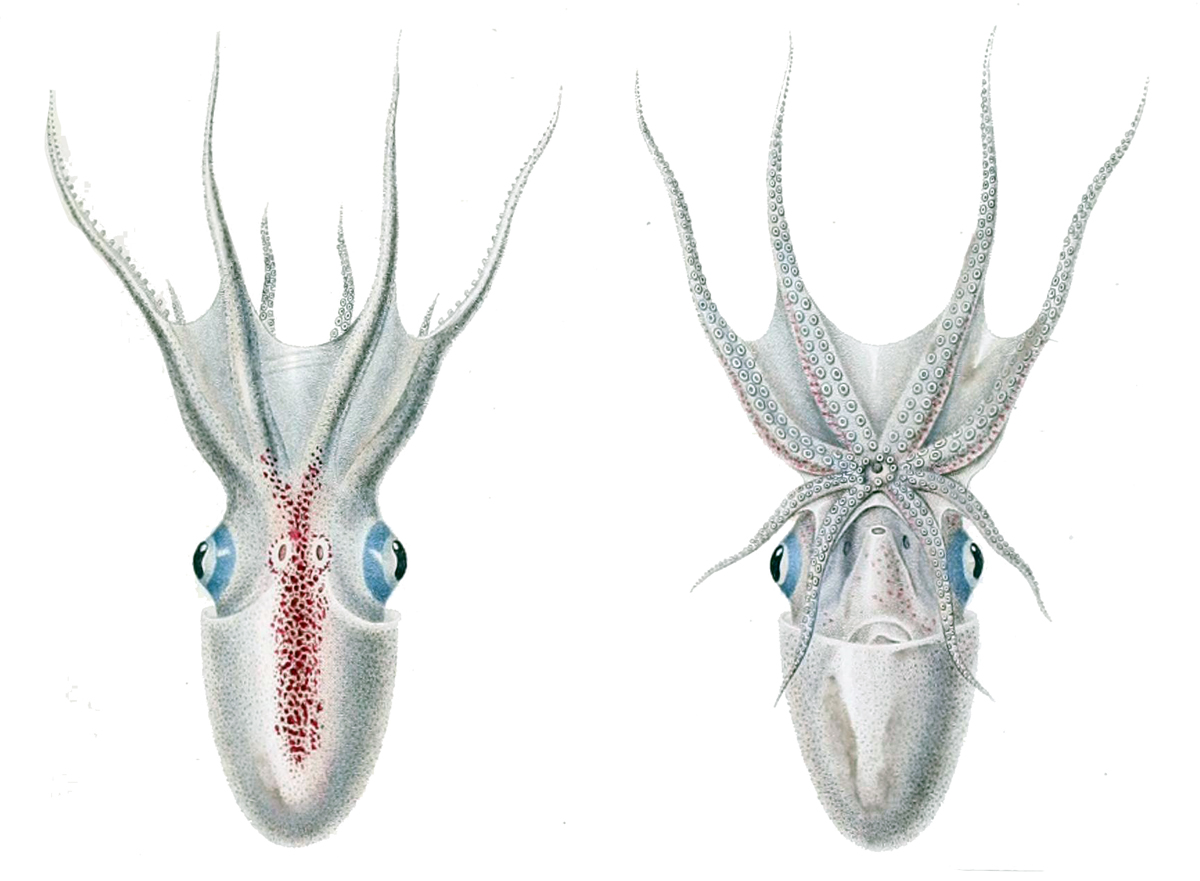

Conservation status
- Least Concern (IUCN 3.1)

Scientific classification
- Kingdom: Animalia
- Phylum: Mollusca
- Class: Cephalopoda
- Order: Octopoda
- Family: Tremoctopodidae
- Genus: Tremoctopus
- Species: T. violaceus

Binomial name
- Tremoctopus violaceus Delle Chiaje, 1830
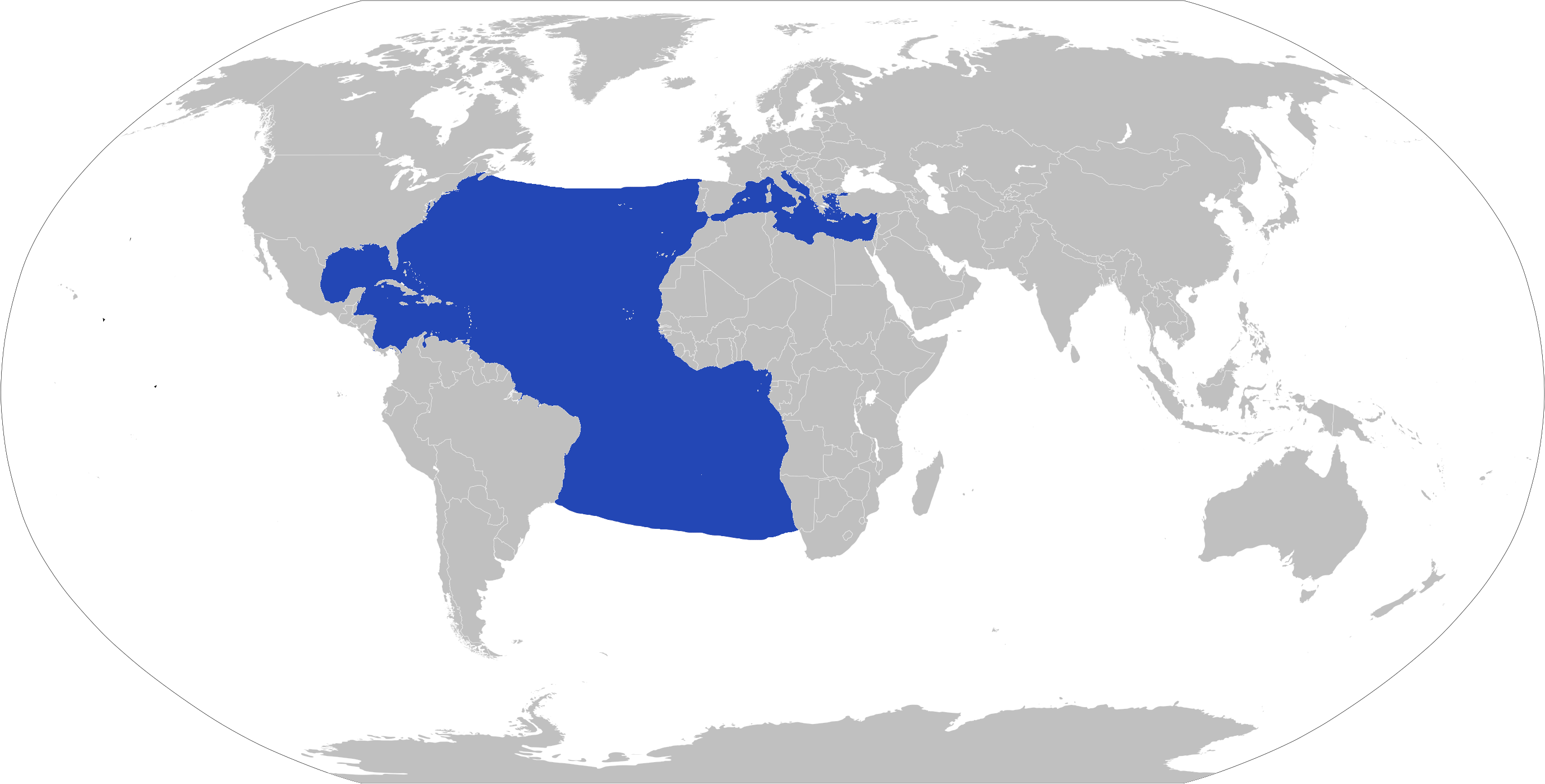
- Distribution of Tremoctopus violaceus
- Range of Tremoctopus violaceus

Synonyms
- Octopus atlanticus D'Orbigny, 1834 in 1834–1847; Octopus gracilis Souleyet, 1852; Octopus koellikerii Verany, 1847; Octopus mycrostoma Reynaud, 1831; Octopus quoyanus D'Orbigny, 1834 in 1834–1847; Ocythoe velata Risso, 1854; Octopus velifer Ferussac, 1835 in 1834–1848; Tremoctopus joubini Hoyle, 1909; Tremoctopus lucifer Akimushkin, 1963; Tremoctopus microstomus (Reynaud, 1831)

= Common blanket octopus =

Species of cephalopod

The common blanket octopus or violet blanket octopus (Tremoctopus violaceus) is a large octopus of the family Tremoctopodidae found worldwide in the epipelagic zone of warm seas. The degree of sexual dimorphism in this species is very high, with females growing up to two meters in length, whereas males grow to about 2.4 cm. The first live specimen of a male was not seen until 2002 off the Great Barrier Reef. Individual weights of males and females differ by a factor of about 10,000 and potentially more.

Recent studies on the mitochondrial genome of Tremoctopus violaceus have provided insights into the species' phylogenetic relationships within the octopus family. The analysis suggests that Tremoctopus violaceus is closely related to other members of the Tremoctopodidae family (Dae-Ju et al., 2022).Males and small females of less than 7 cm have been reported to carry with them the tentacles of the Portuguese man o' war. It is speculated that these tentacles serve both as a defensive mechanism and possibly as a method of capturing prey. This mechanism is no longer useful at larger sizes, which may be why males of this species are so small. The web between the arms of the mature female octopus serves as a defensive measure as well, making the animal appear larger, and being easily detached if bitten into by a predator. The complete mitogenome of T. violaceus is a circular double-stranded DNA sequence that is 16,015 base-pairs long.

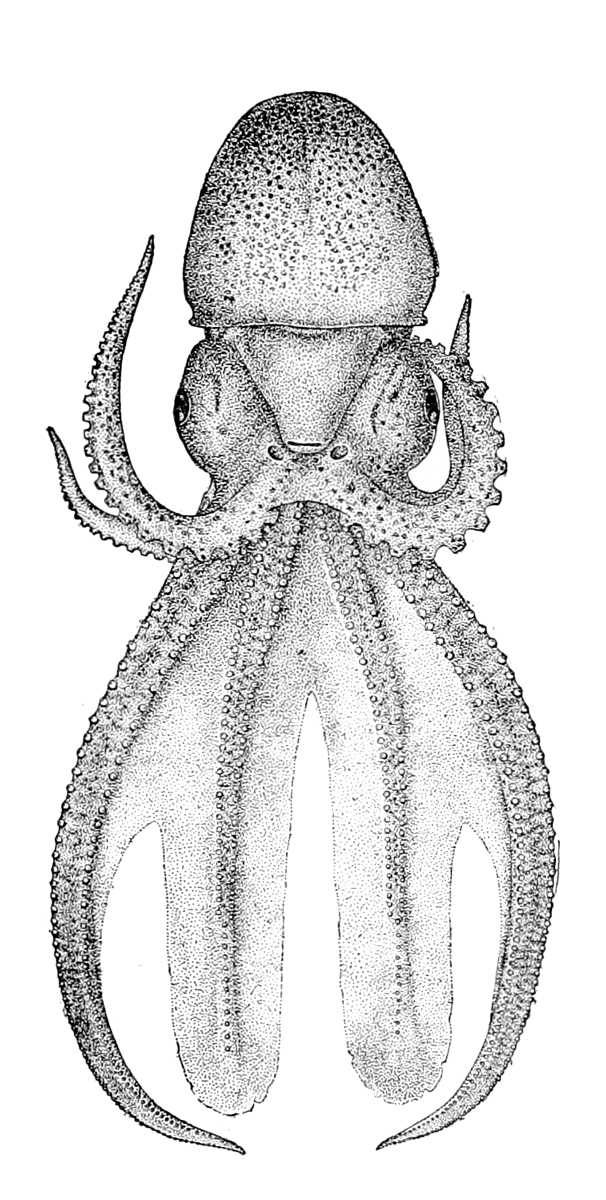
Ventral view of large female

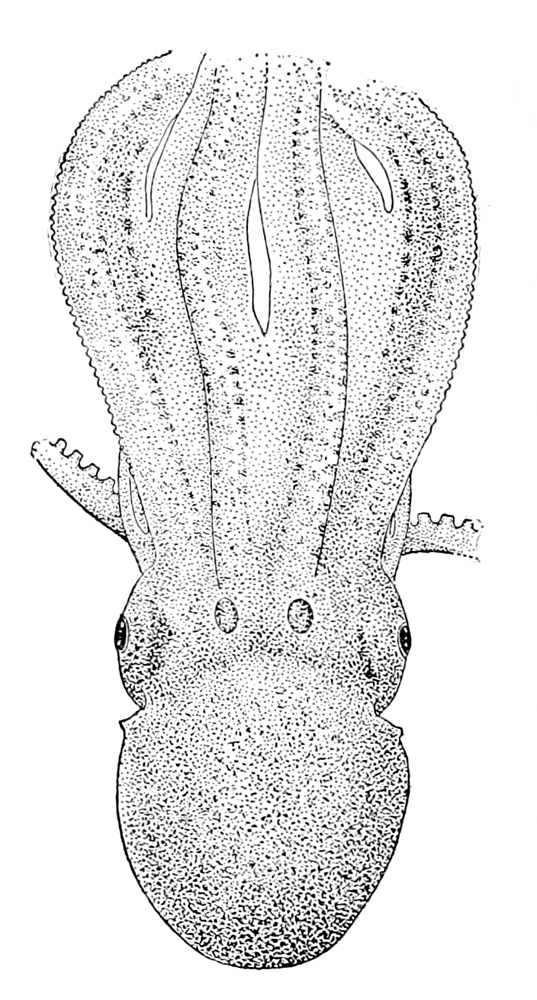
Dorsal view of large female

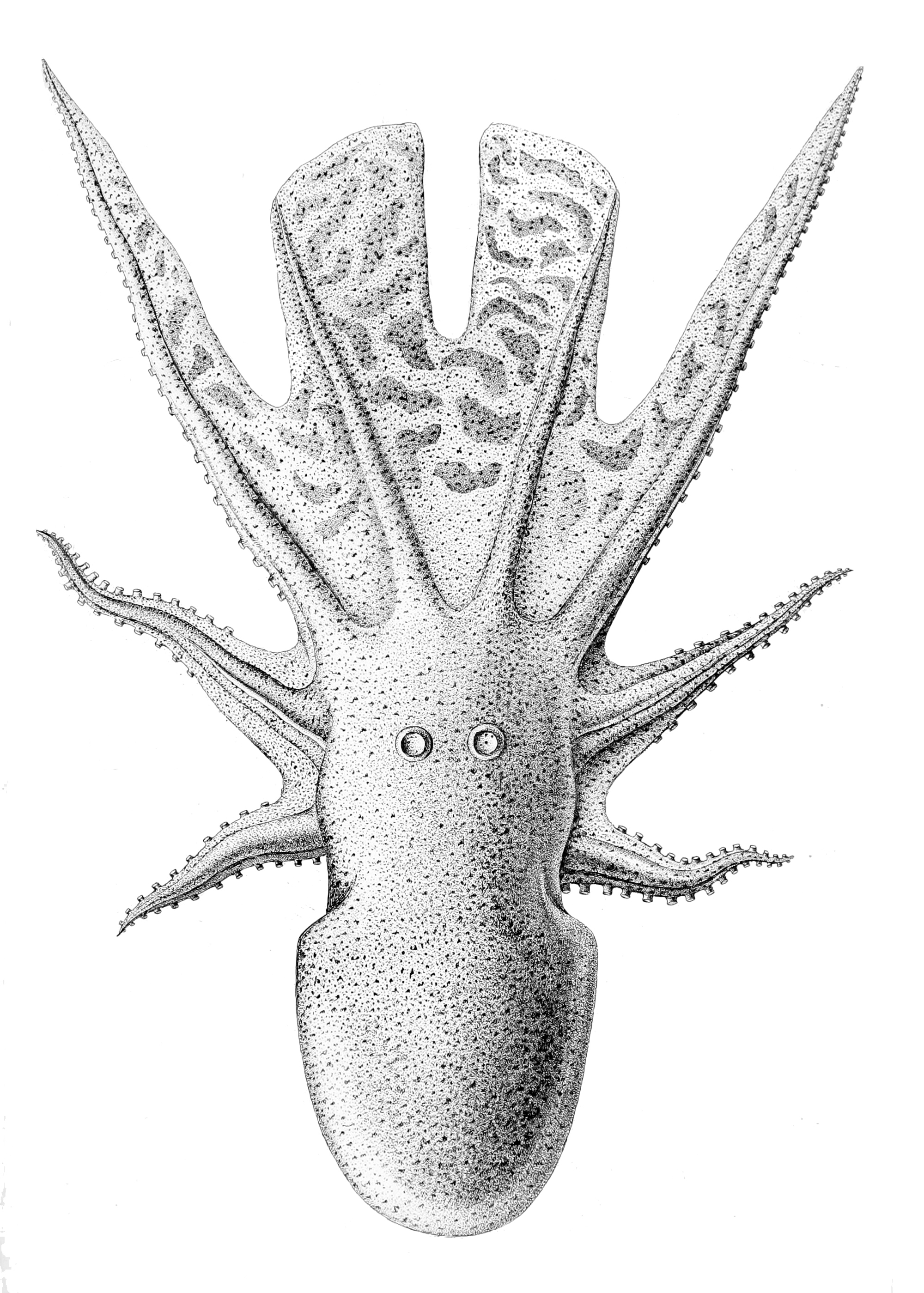
Dorsal view of female

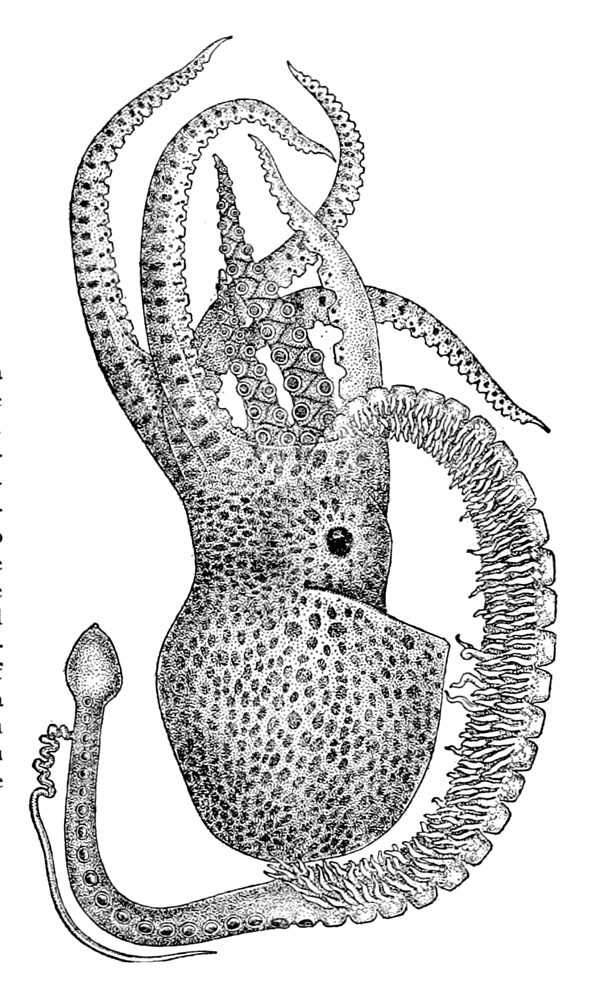
Lateral view of adult male with hectocotylus

== Mating behaviour ==
The third right arm in male blanket octopus is called the hectocotylus, which has a sperm-filled pouch between the arms. When the male is ready to mate, the pouch ruptures, and sperm is released into the arm. He then cuts this arm off and gives it to a female. It is likely that the male dies after mating. The female stores the arm in her mantle to be used when she is ready to fertilize her eggs. She may store several hectocotyli from different males at once.

=== Sexual dimorphism ===
The common blanket octopus exhibits one of the highest degrees of sexual size-dimorphism found in large animals. The blanket octopus exhibits remarkable sexual dimorphism, with females reaching up to 2 meters in length, while males typically remain about 2.4 cm. This size disparity is one of the most striking features of the species (Petrić et al., 2023).There are several theories as to why this developed. It is advantageous for females to be big; their large eggs take a lot of energy to maintain. The bigger a female is, the more eggs she can carry, and she can birth more offspring that could potentially survive to adulthood. Sperm does not require much energy or space to maintain, so males do not face the same pressure to be big. The use of the Portuguese man o' war tentacles is effective only in smaller animals. So selection may have favoured males to remain small in order to continue to utilize this defence mechanism.

== Defense mechanisms ==
Predators of the common blanket octopus include the blue shark, tuna, and the billfish.

When attacked, female blanket octopuses can roll up and unfurl their webbed blanket. This makes them look bigger and may scare off predators. They can also sever the blanket to distract predators.

Additionally, female blanket octopuses have been observed with parts of Portuguese man o' war tentacles attached to their dorsal arms. It was suggested that these tentacles could serve both as defensive and offensive weapons. It is unknown how the blanket octopus obtains the tentacles or whether they are immune to the toxins in the stingers.
