= Mount Soucek =

Mountain in Enderby Land, Antarctica

Mount Soucek (66°49′S 50°58′E) is a mountain standing between Mount Hardy and Peacock Ridge in the northwest part of the Tula Mountains, in Enderby Land. It was plotted from air photos taken from ANARE (Australian National Antarctic Research Expeditions) aircraft in 1956 and was named by the Antarctic Names Committee of Australia (ANCA) for Dr. Zdeněk Souček, a medical officer at Wilkes Station in 1960.
