= Soucek Ravine =

Ravine in Antarctica

Soucek Ravine (66°23′S 110°27′E) is a small ravine to the west of Penney Ravine, Ardery Island, in the Windmill Islands. Discovered in 1960 by a biological field party from Wilkes Station. Named by Antarctic Names Committee of Australia (ANCA) after Zdeněk Souček, medical officer at Wilkes in 1960 and 1962.
