= Mount Miller (disambiguation) =

Mount Miller is a peak of the Saint Elias Mountains in Alaska.

Mount Miller may also refer to:

- Mount Miller (Enderby Land), Antarctica
- Mount Miller (Ross Dependency), Antarctica
