= Mount Tod (Antarctica) =

Mountain in Enderby Land, Antarctica

- Location within Antarctica

Highest point
- Coordinates: 67°13′S 50°39′E

Geography
- Location: Enderby Land, Antarctica

Mount Tod (67°13′S 50°39′E) is a mountain on the southwest side of Auster Glacier, at the head of Amundsen Bay in Enderby Land. Plotted from air photos taken from ANARE (Australian National Antarctic Research Expeditions) aircraft in 1956. Named by Antarctic Names Committee of Australia (ANCA) for Ian Maxwell Tod, weather observer at Mawson Station in 1961.
