= Seavers Ridge =

Seavers Ridge (67°3′S 52°51′E) is a rock ridge 14 nautical miles (26 km) east-southeast of Mount Renouard in Enderby Land. Plotted from air photos taken from ANARE (Australian National Antarctic Research Expeditions) aircraft in 1957. Named by Antarctic Names Committee of Australia (ANCA) for J.A. Seavers, assistant cook at Mawson Station in 1961.
