= Dungey =

Dungey is an English-language surname of Cornish origin. Notable people with the surname include:

- Azie Dungey, American actress
- Channing Dungey (born 1969), American television executive
- Doris Dungey (1961–2008), American blogger
- Eric Dungey (born 1996), American football quarterback
- James Dungey (1923–2015), British space scientist
- Mardi Dungey (1966–2019), Australian macroeconomist
- Merrin Dungey (born 1971), American film and television actress
- Ryan Dungey (born 1989), American motocross racer

== See also ==
- Mount Dungey
