= Mount Oldfield =

Mountain in Antarctica

Mount Oldfield (66°50′S 50°38′E) is a coastal mountain at the east side of Amundsen Bay, standing close west of Mount Hardy in the Tula Mountains. It was photographed and mapped by ANARE (Australian National Antarctic Research Expeditions) in 1956 and was visited and positioned by G.A. Knuckey of ANARE in November 1958. It was named by the Antarctic Names Committee of Australia (ANCA) for R.E.T. Oldfield, a radio officer at Mawson Station in 1958.

Site of camp occupied by G. Knuckey, I. McLeod and R. E. Oldfield November 1958.
