= Mount Best =

Mountain in Enderby Land, Antarctica

Mount Best (66°49′S 51°23′E) is a mountain 1.5 nautical miles (2.8 km) southwest of Mount Morrison, in the Tula Mountains in Enderby Land. It was plotted from air photos taken from ANARE (Australian National Antarctic Research Expeditions) aircraft in 1956. It was named by the Antarctic Names Committee of Australia (ANCA) for F. Best, a member of the crew of the Discovery during the British Australian New Zealand Antarctic Research Expedition (BANZARE) of 1929–31.
