= Mount Henksen =

Mountain in Enderby Land, Antarctica

Mount Henksen (66°46′S 51°4′E) is an elongated mountain with several peaks, standing between Peacock Ridge and Mount Parviainen in the northern part of the Tula Mountains in Enderby Land, Antarctica. It was plotted from air photos taken from Australian National Antarctic Research Expeditions aircraft in 1956 and 1957, and was named by the Antarctic Names Committee of Australia for H. Henksen, a member of the crew of the RRS Discovery during the British Australian New Zealand Antarctic Research Expedition of 1929–31.
