= Mount Sones =

Mountain in Enderby Land, Antarctica

Mount Sones (67°2′S 51°30′E) is a mountain standing on the north side of Beaver Glacier, two nautical miles (3.7 km) west of Mount Reed in the Tula Mountains in Enderby Land, Antarctica.

The mountain was plotted from air photos taken by ANARE (Australian National Antarctic Research Expeditions) in 1956 and was named by the Antarctic Names Committee of Australia (ANCA) in 1962 for F. Sones, a member of the crew of the Discovery during the British Australian New Zealand Antarctic Research Expedition (BANZARE) of 1929–1931.
