= Harvey Nunataks =

Nunataks in Enderby Land, Antarctica

The Harvey Nunataks (66°58′S 52°0′E) are four nunataks standing 4 nautical miles (7 km) west of Mount Ryder, in the eastern part of the Tula Mountains in Enderby Land, Antarctica. They were plotted from air photos taken from Australian National Antarctic Research Expeditions aircraft in 1956 and 1957, and were named by the Antarctic Names Committee of Australia after D.J. Harvey, an electronics engineer at Mawson Station in 1961.
