= Graham Peak (Antarctica) =

Mountain in Antarctica

Graham Peak (66°46′S 50°58′E) is a peak about 7 nautical miles (13 km) east of Mount Riiser-Larsen in the northwestern part of the Tula Mountains in Enderby Land, Antarctica. It was plotted from air photos taken from Australian National Antarctic Research Expeditions aircraft in 1956, and was named by the Antarctic Names Committee of Australia for N. Graham, a cook at Wilkes Station in 1960.
