= Adams Fjord =

Fjord and bay in Antarctica

Coordinates: 66°50′S 50°30′E

Adams Fjord, also variously known as Bukhta Semerka, Bukhta Semyorka or Seven Bay, is a fjord about 13 miles (21 km) long in the northeast part of Amundsen Bay, just south of Mount Riiser-Larsen. Photographed and mapped from ANARE (Australian National Antarctic Research Expeditions) aircraft during 1956. An ANARE party led by Phillip Law entered the fjord by motor launch from the Thala Dan on 14 February 1958 and made a landing at the foot of Mount Riiser-Larsen. Named by ANCA for Ian L. Adams, Officer-in-Charge at Mawson Station in 1958.
