= Mount Reed =

Mountain in Antarctica

Mount Reed (67°2′S 51°38′E) is a mountain standing on the north side of Beaver Glacier, 2 nautical miles (3.7 km) east of Mount Sones in the Tula Mountains, Antarctica. It was plotted from air photos taken by ANARE (Australian National Antarctic Research Expeditions) in 1956 and was named by the Antarctic Names Committee of Australia (ANCA) in 1962 for J.E. Reed, a member of the crew of the Discovery during the British Australian New Zealand Antarctic Research Expedition (BANZARE) of 1929–31.
