= Edwards Islands (Enderby Land) =

Island group in Antarctica

- Location within Antarctica

Geography
- Location: Antarctica
- Coordinates: 66°51′S 50°29′E

Administration
- Administered under the Antarctic Treaty System

Demographics
- Population: Uninhabited

The Edwards Islands are a group of islands in the east side of Amundsen Bay, about 5 kilometres (2.5 nmi) southwest of Mount Oldfield in Enderby Land. They were plotted from air photos taken from Australian National Antarctic Research Expeditions aircraft in 1956, and were named by the Antarctic Names Committee of Australia for T. Edwards, an assistant diesel mechanic at Wilkes Station in 1960.

== See also ==
- List of Antarctic and sub-Antarctic islands
