= Mount Miller (Enderby Land) =

Mountain in Enderby Land, Antarctica

Mount Miller (66°57′S 51°16′E) is a mountain 1 nautical mile (2 km) northwest of Pythagoras Peak, in the Tula Mountains of Enderby Land, Antarctica. It was plotted from air photos taken from Australian National Antarctic Research Expeditions aircraft in 1956, and was named by the Antarctic Names Committee of Australia for J.J. Miller, a member of the crew of the RRS Discovery during the British Australian New Zealand Antarctic Research Expedition of 1929–31.
