= Mount Denham =

Mountain in Enderby Land, Antarctica

Mount Denham (66°55′S 52°19′E) is a mountain 1 nautical mile (2 km) northwest of Mount Keyser, in the eastern part of the Tula Mountains in Enderby Land. It was plotted from air photos taken from Australian National Antarctic Research Expeditions aircraft in 1957, and was named by the Antarctic Names Committee of Australia for W.M. Denham, a weather observer at Mawson Station in 1961.
