= Mount Letten =

Mountain in Enderby Land, Antarctica

Mount Letten (66°55′S 51°3′E) is a mountain 1 nautical mile (2 km) south of Mount Storer, in the Tula Mountains of Enderby Land, Antarctica. It was plotted from air photos taken from Australian National Antarctic Research Expeditions aircraft in 1956 and 1957 and was named by the Antarctic Names Committee of Australia for W.H. Letten, a member of the crew of the RSS Discovery during the British Australian New Zealand Antarctic Research Expedition of 1929–31.
