= Mount Harvey =

Mount Harvey is the name of five mountains:

== North America ==
- Mount Harvey (Alberta), 56 km SE of Grande Cache, Alberta, Canada
- Mount Harvey (Babine Mountains), in the Bulkley Country region of British Columbia, Canada
- Mount Harvey (British Columbia), in the Atlin District of British Columbia, Canada, located 41 km N of Skagway, Alaska
- Mount Harvey (Britannia Range), located northeast of the Village of Lions Bay, British Columbia, Canada

== Antarctica ==
- Mount Harvey (Antarctica)
