= Graham Peak =

Graham Peak may refer to:

- Graham Peak (Antarctica)
- Graham Peak (Colorado)
- Graham Peak (Idaho)
- Graham Peak (Utah)

== See also ==
- Mount Graham, Arizona
