= Mount Degerfeldt =

Mountain in Enderby Land, Antarctica

Mount Degerfeldt (66°58′S 51°1′E) is a mountain 3.5 nautical miles (6 km) south of Mount Storer, in the Tula Mountains in Enderby Land. It was plotted from air photos taken from Australian National Antarctic Research Expeditions aircraft in 1956 and 1957, and was named by the Antarctic Names Committee of Australia for Carl Larsson Degerfeldt, a member of the crew of the Discovery during the British Australian New Zealand Antarctic Research Expedition of 1929–31.
