= Gage Ridge =

Gage Ridge (66°54′S 51°16′E) is a partially snow-covered ridge, 7 nautical miles (13 km) long, standing 2.5 nautical miles (5 km) west of Mount Selwood in the Tula Mountains in Enderby Land, Antarctica. It was plotted from air photos taken from Australian National Antarctic Research Expeditions aircraft in 1956, and was named by the Antarctic Names Committee of Australia for H.V. Gage, a member of the crew of the Discovery during the British Australian New Zealand Antarctic Research Expedition, 1929–31.
