= Tremoctopus gelatus =

Conservation status
- Least Concern (IUCN 3.1)

Scientific classification
- Kingdom: Animalia
- Phylum: Mollusca
- Class: Cephalopoda
- Order: Octopoda
- Family: Tremoctopodidae
- Genus: Tremoctopus
- Species: T. gelatus

Binomial name
- Tremoctopus gelatus R. F. Thomas, 1977

Species of octopus

Tremoctopus gelatus, the gelatinous blanket octopus, is a species of octopod formally described by Thomas in 1977. The length of T. gelatus is unknown. The gelatinous blanket octopus lives in pelagic subtropical waters of the Atlantic Ocean.
