= Mount Ryder =

Mountain in Enderby Land, Antarctica

Mount Ryder (66°57′S 52°15′E) is a mountain between Harvey Nunataks and Mount Keyser, in the east part of the Tula Mountains in Enderby Land. It was plotted from air photos taken from ANARE (Australian National Antarctic Research Expeditions) aircraft in 1956 and 1957 and was named by the Antarctic Names Committee of Australia (ANCA) for Brian Paul "Red" Ryder, a radio officer at Mawson Station in 1961.
