= Olga Zolina =

Russian meteorologist

- Born: 6 February 1975 (age 51); Moscow, Soviet Union
- Scientific career
- Fields: Meteorologist; Atmospheric Scientist

Olga Zolina (born 6 February 1975) is a climate scientist. She is a member of the European Geosciences Union, German Meteorological Society and the American Geophysical Union. As of 2020, she works at the Shirshov Institute of Oceanology in Moscow and at CNRS Institut des Géosciences de l'Environnement, Grenoble.

== Publications ==
- "Changes in Intense Precipitation in Europe" in Changes in Flood Risk in Europe (2012), ed. Zbigniew W. Kundzewicz
