= Robertson Landing =

Robertson Landing (66°23′S 110°26′E) is a boat landing on the north side of Ardery Island, near the west end of the island, in the Windmill Islands. A landing was first made here by Phillip Law and an ANARE (Australian National Antarctic Research Expeditions) party from the launch Robertson of Melbourne, donor of the launch.
