= Pythagoras Peak =

Peak in Antarctica

Coordinates: 66°59′S 51°20′E

Pythagoras Peak is the highest peak, 1,275 m, in the central Tula Mountains, standing along the north side of Beaver Glacier, 8 nautical miles (15 km) southeast of Mount Storer. The peak has a prominent notch, the eastern aspect being a right-angled triangle with a perpendicular northern face. It was photographed from Mount Riiser-Larsen in February 1958 by ANARE (Australian National Antarctic Research Expeditions) led by Phillip Law, but was first visited and surveyed in December 1958 by G.A. Knuckey, ANARE surveyor. It was named by the Antarctic Names Committee of Australia (ANCA) after Pythagoras, Greek philosopher, whose theorem concerning a right-angled triangle is well known.
