= Mount Shirshov =

Mountain in Enderby Land, Antarctica

Mount Shirshov (66°51′S 51°37′E) is a small mountain lying 3 miles (4.8 km) northeast of Mount Selwood in the Tula Mountains, Enderby Land. The mountain was visited by geologists of the Soviet Antarctic Expedition of 1961-62 who named it for P.P. Shirshov, a Soviet polar explorer.
