= Mount King (Antarctica) =

Mountain in Antarctica

- Location within Antarctica

Highest point
- Elevation: 1,425 m (4,675 ft)
- Coordinates: 67°01′S 52°49′E

Geography
- Location: Enderby Land, East Antarctica
- Parent range: Tula Mountains

Geology
- Mountain type: Metamorphic

Climbing
- Easiest route: basic snow/ice climb

Mount King is a large, smooth-crested mountain in the eastern extremity of the Tula Mountains. Part of the Australian Antarctic Gazetteer (Australian Antarctic Gazetteer Id 1581) and the SCAR Composite Gazetteer of Antarctica, it is located in Enderby Land, East Antarctica, which is claimed by Australia as part of the Australian Antarctic Territory. The head of Beaver Glacier is located very close to the base of Mount King.

Mount King was discovered and mapped in December, 1958, by an ANARE (Australian National Antarctic Research Expeditions) dog-sledge party led by G.A. Knuckey. Named after Peter W. King, radio officer at Mawson in 1957 and 1958, a member of the dog-sledge party.

== Flora and fauna ==
To date, no flora or fauna have been observed within 1.0 degrees of Mount King:
