= Penney Ravine =

Ravine in Antarctica

Penney Ravine (66°22′S 110°27′E) is a small ravine on Ardery Island in the Windmill Islands. It is on the northern side of the island just west of center. Discovered in February 1960 by a biological field party from Wilkes Station. Named by Antarctic Names Committee of Australia (ANCA) for Richard L. Penney, biologist at Wilkes Station in 1959 and 1960.
