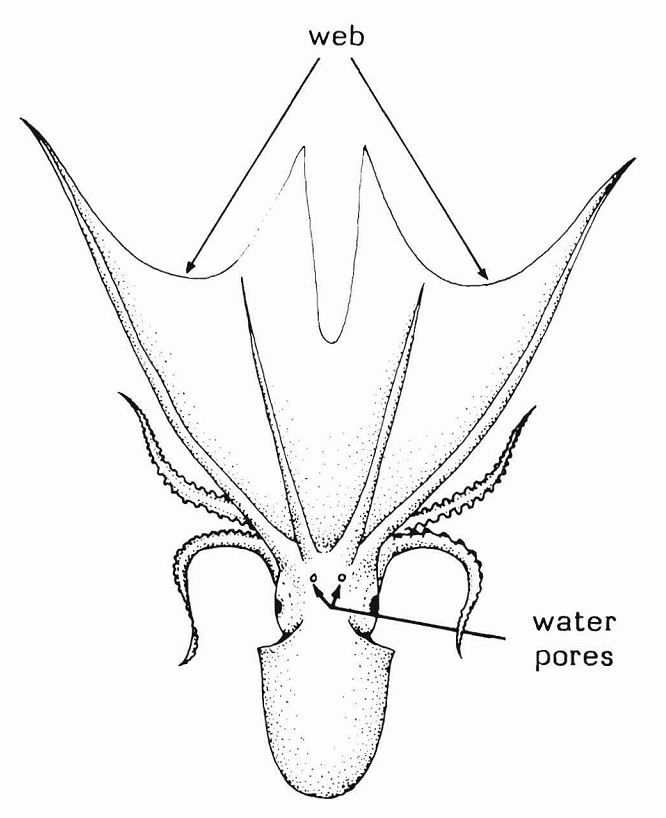
- Adult female Tremoctopus

Scientific classification
- Kingdom: Animalia
- Phylum: Mollusca
- Class: Cephalopoda
- Order: Octopoda
- Suborder: Incirrata
- Superfamily: Argonautoidea
- Family: Tremoctopodidae; Tryon, 1879
- Genus: Tremoctopus; Chiaje, 1830

Type species
- Tremoctopus violaceus delle Chiaje, 1830

Species
- See text

Synonyms
- Philonexis d'Orbigny, 1835

= Blanket octopus =

Genus of cephalopods

Tremoctopus is a genus of pelagic cephalopods, containing four species that occupy surface to mid-waters in subtropical and tropical oceans. They are commonly known as blanket octopuses, in reference to the long, transparent webs that connect the dorsal and dorsolateral arms of the adult females. The other arms are much shorter and lack webbing.

== Description ==
The common blanket octopus (Tremoctopus violaceus) exhibits one of the most extreme sexual size-dimorphism known in any animal near its size or larger. Females may reach 2 m (6.6 ft) in length, whereas the males are 2.4 cm (1 inch). The weight ratio is at least 10,000:1, and can probably reach as much as 40,000:1. Adult Females carry a webbing between their arms, known as a "blanket". This webbing can be unfolded to make the female appear larger when threatened, deterring potential predators.

== Reproduction ==
Male blanket octopuses have a large arm in a spherical pouch modified for mating, known as a hectocotylus. During mating, this arm is detached, and kept by the female in her mantle cavity until used for fertilisation. The male almost certainly dies shortly after mating. There is competition between the males; multiple male arms have been found in the mantle cavity of females. The females carry an estimated 100,000 to 300,000 eggs attached to a sausage-shaped calcareous secretion held at the base of the dorsal arms and carried by the female until hatching.

== Habitat and behavior ==
Blanket octopuses are immune to the venomous Portuguese man o' war, whose tentacles the male and immature females rip off and use for offensive and defensive purposes. Like many other octopuses, the blanket octopus uses ink to intimidate potential predators. Also, when threatened, the female unfurls her large net-like membranes that spread out and billow in the water, greatly increasing her apparent size.

Blanket octopuses usually live in coral reefs, where they hunt for food, with the females hunting smaller fish and crustaceans as they are mainly carnivorous. They also hide from their predators there, including larger fish and even whales. The risks these reefs face include coral bleaching and ocean acidification. Although this can be dangerous to the blanket octopus because it is their habitat, these creatures are nomadic meaning they can move around and find shelter elsewhere, and they also have the capability to adjust to varying temperatures within the ocean.

== Species ==
- Tremoctopus gelatus, gelatinous blanket octopus
- Tremoctopus robsonianus
- Tremoctopus gracilis, palmate octopus
- Tremoctopus violaceus, common blanket octopus or violet blanket octopus (Note: Examination of mitochondrial DNA in specimens captured in the Mediterranean Sea found that they belonged to T. violaceus together with specimens from the Gulf of Mexico.)
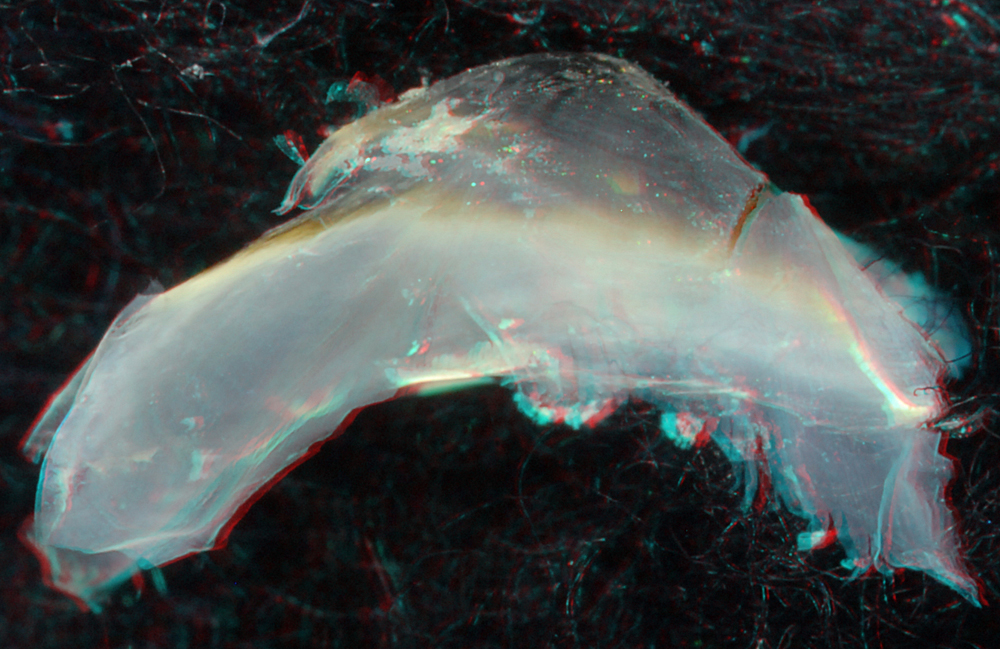
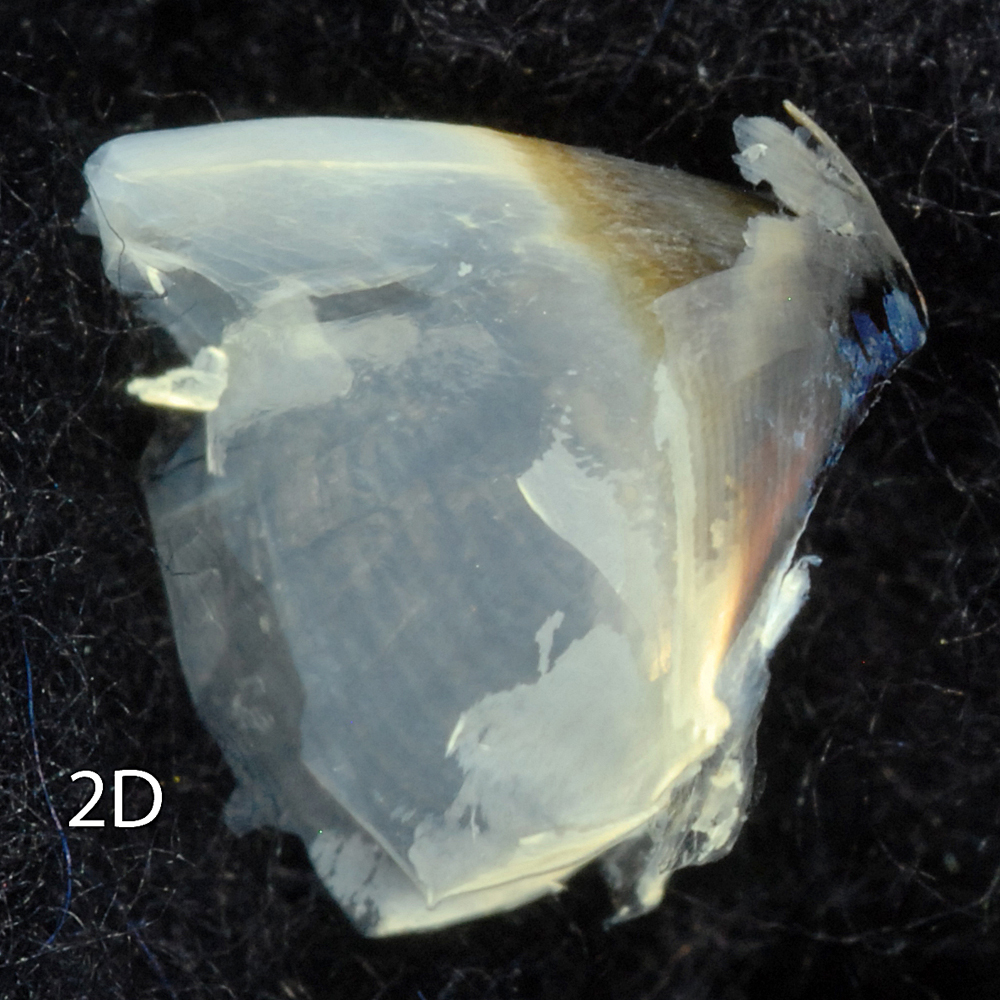
Lower (left) and upper beaks of female Tremoctopus gracilis (54 mm ML) in lateral view
3D red cyan glasses are recommended to view this image correctly.
