= Mount Selwood =

Mountain in Enderby Land, Antarctica

Mount Selwood (66°54′S 51°30′E) is a mountain 5 nautical miles (9 km) northeast of Pythagoras Peak, in the Tula Mountains in Enderby Land. It was plotted from air photos taken from ANARE (Australian National Antarctic Research Expeditions) aircraft in 1956 and was named by the Antarctic Names Committee of Australia (ANCA) for C.H.V. Selwood, a member of the crew of the Discovery during the British Australian New Zealand Antarctic Research Expedition (BANZARE) of 1929–31.

== See also ==
- Gage Ridge
