= Mount Dungey =

Mountain in Enderby Land, Antarctica

Mount Dungey (67°0′S 51°15′E) is a mountain 1 nautical mile (2 km) west of Pythagoras Peak in the Tula Mountains, Enderby Land, Antarctica. It was plotted from air photos taken from Australian National Antarctic Research Expeditions aircraft in 1956, and was named by the Antarctic Names Committee of Australia for F.G. Dungey, a member of the crew of the Discovery during the British Australian New Zealand Antarctic Research Expedition of 1929–31.
