= Pyotr Shirshov =

Soviet scientist and explorer (1905–1953)

- Пётр Ширшов
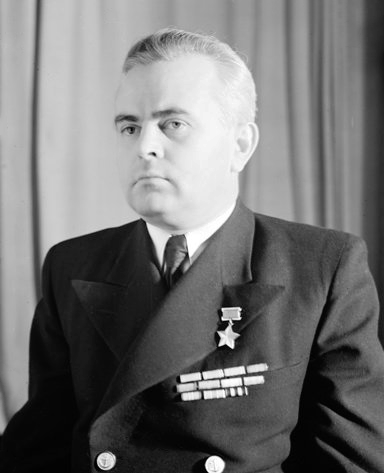
- Shirshov in 1946
- Born: 25 December [O.S. 12 December] 1905; Yekaterinoslav, Yekaterinoslav Governorate, Russian Empire
- Died: 17 February 1953 (aged 47); Moscow, Russian SFSR, Soviet Union
- Awards: Hero of the Soviet Union

Pyotr Petrovich Shirshov (Russian: Пётр Петро́вич Ширшо́в; 25 December [O.S. 12 December] 1905 – 17 February 1953) was a Soviet oceanographer, hydrobiologist, polar explorer, statesman, academician (1939), the first minister of Ministry of Maritime Fleet of the USSR and Hero of the Soviet Union (1938).

Pyotr Shirshov graduated from the Odessa Public Education Institute in 1929. In 1929–1932, he was a researcher at the Botanical Garden of the Soviet Academy of Sciences. In 1932–1936, Pyotr Shirshov was employed as a researcher at the All-Union Arctic Institute. He participated in numerous Arctic expeditions, including the ones on icebreakers Sibiryakov (1932) and Chelyuskin and a drifting ice station North Pole-1 (1937–1938). In 1942–1948, Pyotr Shirshov was People's Commissar of the Maritime Fleet, later minister of Ministry of Maritime Fleet of the USSR. In 1946–1953, he headed the Institute of Oceanology of the Soviet Academy of Sciences, which he had established himself. In 1946–1950, Pyotr Shirshov chaired the Pacific Ocean Science Committee.

Pyotr Shirshov authored numerous works dealing with his research on plankton in polar regions. He is known to have proven the fallacy of the hypothesis that there is no life in high latitudes of the Arctic Ocean. Pyotr Shirshov was awarded three Orders of Lenin, four other orders, and several medals.

== Memoria ==
A bay in the Franz Josef Land, an underwater range in the Bering Sea, and Shirshov Institute of Oceanology bear Pyotr Shirshov's name.

Mount Shirshov, in the Tula Mountains, Enderby Land, is also named after Shirshov.
