= Ragged Peaks =

Mountains in Antarctica

Ragged Peaks (66°59′S 51°0′E) is a prominent group of peaks on the eastern side of Amundsen Bay in Antarctica, in a line running almost north–south. The peaks, extending 8 nautical miles (15 km), contain several spires and the ridge connecting the peaks is much serrated. There are five peaks over 915 metres (3,002 ft). They were sighted in October 1956 by the ANARE (Australian National Antarctic Research Expeditions) Amundsen Bay party led by P. W. Crohn. The descriptive name was given by the Antarctic Names Committee of Australia (ANCA).
