= Mount Harvey (Antarctica) =

Mountain in Enderby Land, Antarctica

Mount Harvey (66°55′S 50°48′E) is a snow-free peak east of Amundsen Bay, standing in the Tula Mountains of Antarctica, about 6 nautical miles (11 km) east-northeast of Mount Gleadell. It was sighted in 1955 by an Australian National Antarctic Research Expeditions party led by P.W. Crohn, and was named by the Antarctic Names Committee of Australia for William Harvey, a carpenter at Mawson Station in 1954.
