= Mount Renouard =

Mountain in Enderby Land, Antarctica

Mount Renouard (67°0′S 52°26′E) is a mountain 3 nautical miles (6 km) south of Mount Keyser, in the east part of the Tula Mountains in Enderby Land. It was plotted from air photos taken from ANARE (Australian National Antarctic Research Expeditions) aircraft in 1957 and was named by Antarctic Names Committee of Australia (ANCA) for H.E. von Renouard, a weather observer at Mawson Station in 1961.
