= Odbert Island =

Island in Antarctica

- Location within Antarctica

Geography
- Location: Antarctica
- Coordinates: 66°22′S 110°33′E
- Archipelago: Windmill Islands
- Length: 2.5 km (1.55 mi)
- Width: 0.5 km (0.31 mi)
- Highest elevation: 100 m (300 ft)

Administration
- Administered under the Antarctic Treaty System

Demographics
- Population: Uninhabited

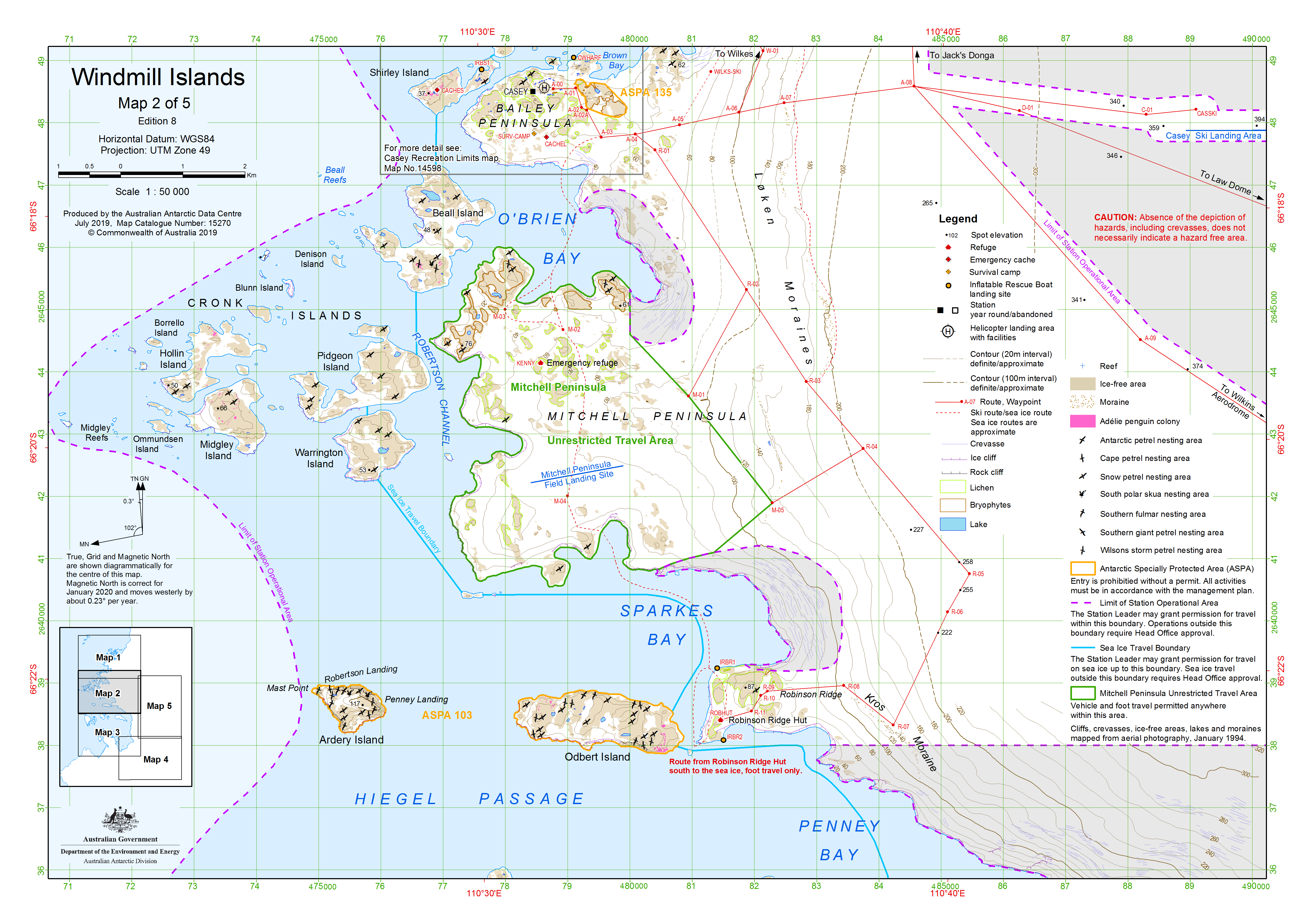
A map featuring Odbert island

Odbert Island is a rocky island, 2.4 km (1.5 mi) long, between Ardery Island and Robinson Ridge in the Windmill Islands of Antarctica.

== History ==
The island was first mapped from air photos taken in the course of the US Navy's Operations Highjump and Windmill in 1947 and 1948. It was named by the United States Advisory Committee on Antarctic Names (US-ACAN) for Lieutenant Jack A. Odbert, assistant aerological officer with Operation Windmill which established astronomical control stations in the area in January 1948.

Haunn Bluff is a steep rock bluff which surmounts the eastern part of the south shore of the island. It was named by the US-ACAN for Marvin G. Haunn, meteorologist and member of the Wilkes Station party of 1962.

Swan Point is the westernmost point of the island. It was named by the US-ACAN for Aerographer's Mate John R. Swan, a member of the Wilkes Station party of 1958.

== Antarctic Specially Protected Area ==
Odbert Island, along with nearby Ardery Island, is protected under the Antarctic Treaty System as Antarctic Specially Protected Area (ASPA) No.103 because they support several breeding species of petrel and provide examples of their habitat, notably that of Antarctic petrels and southern fulmars. Odbert also has breeding colonies of Adélie penguins. The site has also been identified as an Important Bird Area by BirdLife International on the basis of the numbers of seabirds present.

== See also ==
- List of Antarctic and subantarctic islands
