= Beaver Glacier (Enderby Land) =

Glacier in Enderby Land, Antarctica

- Location within Antarctica
- Location: Enderby Land
- Coordinates: 67°2′S 50°40′E
- Length: 15 nmi (28 km; 17 mi)
- Width: 4 nmi (7 km; 5 mi)
- Terminus: Amundsen Bay
- Status: unknown

Beaver Glacier is a glacier about 15 miles (24 km) long and 4 miles (6 km) wide, flowing west into Amundsen Bay between Auster Glacier and Mount Gleadell. The head of Beaver Glacier is located very close to the base of Mount King in Enderby Land. It was visited by an Australian National Antarctic Research Expeditions (ANARE) party on October 28, 1956, and named after the Beaver aircraft used by ANARE in coastal exploration.

== See also ==
- List of glaciers in the Antarctic
- Glaciology
