= Mount Bond (Antarctica) =

Mountain in Antarctica

Mount Bond (66°49′S 51°7′E) is a mountain just south of Mount Rhodes, in the Tula Mountains in Enderby Land. Plotted from air photos taken from ANARE (Australian National Antarctic Research Expeditions) aircraft in 1956. Named by Antarctic Names Committee of Australia (ANCA) for E. Bond, a member of the crew of the Discovery during the British Australian New Zealand Antarctic Research Expedition (BANZARE), 1929–31.
