= Vladimir Shtokman =

Vladimir Boresovich Shtokman
- Born: 10 March 1909; Moscow, Russia
- Died: 14 June 1968 (aged 59); Moscow
- Education: University of Moscow
- Scientific career
- Fields: Oceanography, Geophysics
- Workplaces: University of Moscow, Shirshov Institute of Oceanology, Russian Academy of Sciences, UNIRO, Institute of Theoretical Geophysics

Vladimir Borisovich Shtokman (Russian: Владимир Борисович Штокман; 10 March 1909 – 14 June 1968) was a Soviet oceanographer and geophysicist.

== Early life ==
Shtokman began his academic career in 1928, joining the faculty of physics and mathematics at the University of Moscow to study the emerging field of geophysics. He suspended his studies in 1932 to start work as a laboratory assistant in the Institute of Oceanography, whilst also working on the problem of undersea cables breaking unexpectedly. Shtokman was promoted for his work and led an expedition to the Barents Sea in 1933, where the Shtokman field, discovered in 1988, is located.

== Academic career ==
In 1934, Shtokman moved from Moscow to Baku, where he created the Laboratory of Physical Oceanography as part of the Soviet Union's All-Union Scientific Research Institute of Ocean Fisheries and Oceanography (UNIRO). Still a young scientist, this position proved to be very productive for him and allowed Sthokman to publish more than 20 articles devoted to the investigation of flow and mixture processes in the Caspian Sea. Shtokman finished his PhD in 1938.

During World War II, Shtokman was working at the Institute of Theoretical Geophysics in Krasnoyarsk, so was able to continue his work relatively unaffected by war.

== Death ==
Shtokman died of heart disease, in Moscow, on 14 June 1968.
