= Penney Landing =

Penney Landing (66°22′S 110°28′E) is the only practical landing place toward the eastern end of the northern side of Ardery Island, in the Windmill Islands. Discovered in 1959 by Richard L. Penney, biologist at Wilkes Station, for whom it was named by Antarctic Names Committee of Australia (ANCA).
