= Mount Parviainen =

Mountain in the Tula Mountains, Antarctica

Mount Parviainen (66°45′S 51°7′E) is a mountain close northeast of Mount Henksen, in the north part of the Tula Mountains in Enderby Land. It was plotted from air photos taken from ANARE (Australian National Antarctic Research Expeditions) aircraft in 1956 and was named by the Antarctic Names Committee of Australia (ANCA) for L. Parviainen, a member of the crew of the Discovery during the British Australian New Zealand Antarctic Research Expedition (BANZARE) of 1929–31.
