= Auguste Adolphe Marc Reynaud =

Auguste Adolphe Marc Reynaud (7 May 1804, in Toulon – 4 February 1887, in Toulon) was a French naval surgeon and naturalist.

As a naval surgeon, he obtained a "third-class" ranking in 1821. Beginning in 1846, he served as chief surgeon, and in 1858 was named inspector general of the Bureau of Medicine and Surgery. During the Franco-Prussian War he was tasked with the organization of naval ambulance services.

He took part in several sea voyages during his career, most notably in 1827–28 aboard the Chevrette, from which he collected zoological specimens during trips to India, Burma and the Dutch East Indies. In 1836 he became a correspondent member of the Académie Nationale de Médecine.

The echinoid species Temnopleurus reynaudi as well as the Red-fronted Coua (Coua reynaudii) are named in his honor.

== Published works ==
- Dissertation sur la température humaine, considérée sous le rapport des âges, des tempéramens, des races et des climats, 1829.
- Traité pratique des maladies vénériennes, 1845.
