= Mount Hardy =

Mountain in Enderby Land, Antarctica

Mount Hardy (66°49′S 50°43′E) is a mountain standing close east of Mount Oldfield in the northwest part of the Tula Mountains, in Enderby Land, Antarctica. It was plotted from air photos taken from Australian National Antarctic Research Expeditions aircraft in 1956 and was named by the Antarctic Names Committee of Australia for K. Hardy, a weather observer at Wilkes Station in 1959.
