= Auster Glacier =

Glacier in Antarctica

- Location within Antarctica
- Location: Enderby Land
- Coordinates: 67°12′S 50°45′E
- Width: 2 nmi (4 km; 2 mi)
- Thickness: unknown
- Terminus: Amundsen Bay
- Status: unknown

Auster Glacier (67°12′S 50°45′E) is a glacier about 2 miles (3 km) wide, flowing northwest into the southeast extremity of Amundsen Bay. It was sighted in October 1956 by an Australian National Antarctic Research Expeditions (ANARE) party led by P.W. Crohn, and named after the Auster aircraft used by ANARE in coastal exploration.

At its southwest side is Mount Tod.

== See also ==
- List of glaciers in the Antarctic
- Glaciology
