= Edwards Islands (Canisteo Peninsula) =

Islands of Antarctica

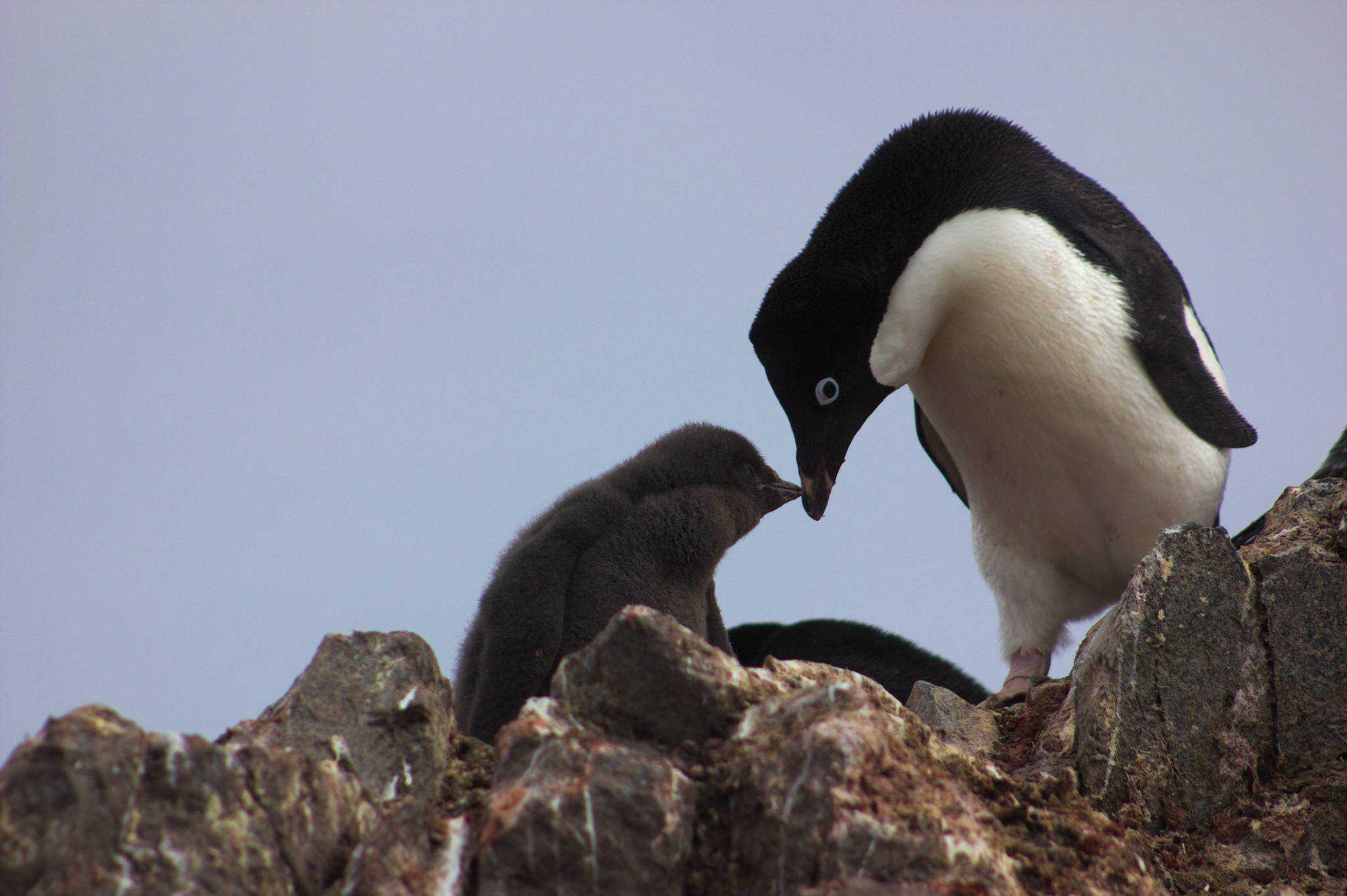
- Adélie penguins breed on the islands

- Location in Antarctica

- Location within Antarctica

Geography
- Location: Marie Byrd Land, Antarctica
- Coordinates: 73°53′00″S 103°08′00″W
- Total islands: 20

Administration
- Administered under the Antarctic Treaty System

Demographics
- Population: Uninhabited

The Edwards Islands are a group of about 20 small islands, mostly ice free in summer, lying off the south-western tip of the Canisteo Peninsula, which projects into the eastern Amundsen Sea between Cranton and Ferrero Bays, on the Walgreen Coast of Marie Byrd Land, Antarctica. They were plotted from air photos taken by U.S. Navy Squadron VX-6 in January 1960, and were named by the Advisory Committee on Antarctic Names for Z T Edwards, chief quartermaster on the USS Glacier during the U.S. Navy Bellingshausen Sea Expedition to this area in February 1960.

== Important Bird Area ==
A 178 ha site, comprising the larger ice-free islands of the Edwards group and the intervening marine area, has been designated an Important Bird Area (IBA) by BirdLife International because it supports a breeding colony of about 58,000 Adélie penguins, estimated from 2010 satellite imagery.

== See also ==
- List of Antarctic and Subantarctic islands
