= Mount Morrison (Idaho) =

Mountain in Idaho, United States

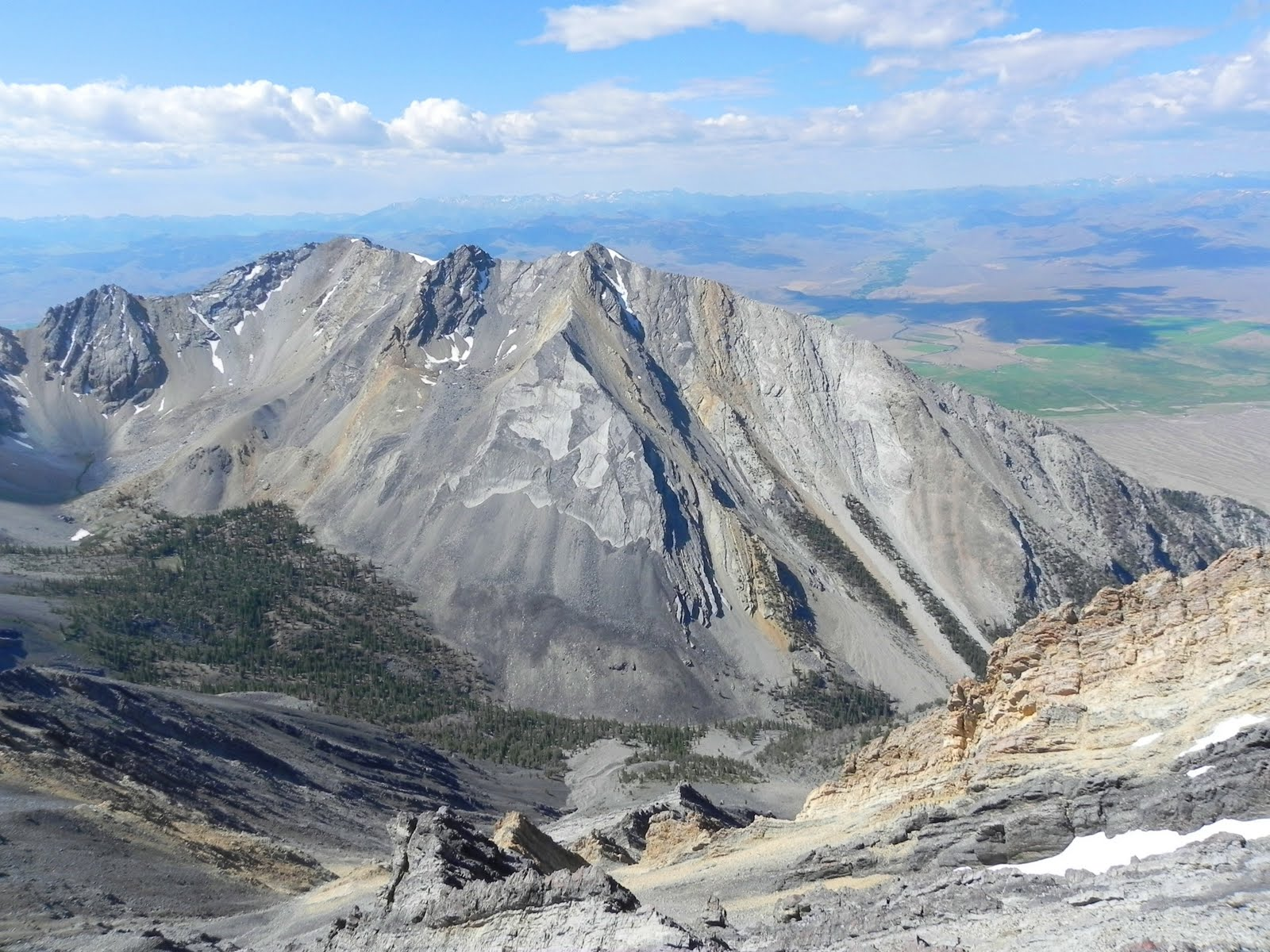
- Northeast aspect

Highest point
- Elevation: 11,367 ft (3,465 m)
- Prominence: 627 ft (191 m)
- Parent peak: Mount Idaho (12,065 ft)
- Isolation: 1.20 mi (1.93 km)
- Coordinates: 44°06′04″N 113°48′03″W

Naming
- Etymology: Lee Morrison

Geography
- Location within Idaho Location within the United States
- Location: Salmon–Challis National Forest
- Country: United States of America
- State: Idaho
- County: Custer
- Parent range: Lost River Range; Rocky Mountains
- Topo map: USGS Elkhorn Creek

Geology
- Rock age: Mississippian
- Mountain type: Fault block
- Rock type: Limestone

Climbing
- Easiest route: class 3 scrambling

Mount Morrison is an 11,367-foot elevation (3,465 m) mountain summit located in Custer County, Idaho, United States.

== Description ==
Mount Morrison ranks as the 56th-highest peak in Idaho and is part of the Lost River Range which is a subset of the Rocky Mountains. The mountain is set on land managed by Salmon–Challis National Forest. Neighbors include White Cap Peak 2.6 miles southeast, line parent Mount Idaho, 1.2 mile east-northeast, and Borah Peak, the highest peak in Idaho, is 2.7 miles to the north-northeast. Precipitation runoff from the mountain's slopes drains to Big Lost River. Topographic relief is significant as the summit rises 5,000 feet (1,500 meters) above Thousand Springs Valley in 2.5 miles. This landform's unofficial toponym honors Lee Morrison, USGS topographer who mapped much of Idaho from 1924 through 1935. His calculations in 1929 discovered that an unnamed peak (which would become Borah Peak) was the highest in the state.

== Climate ==
Based on the Köppen climate classification, Mount Morrison is located in an alpine subarctic climate zone with long, cold, snowy winters, and cool to warm summers. Winter temperatures can drop below −10 °F with wind chill factors below −30 °F.

== See also ==
- List of mountain peaks of Idaho

== Gallery ==
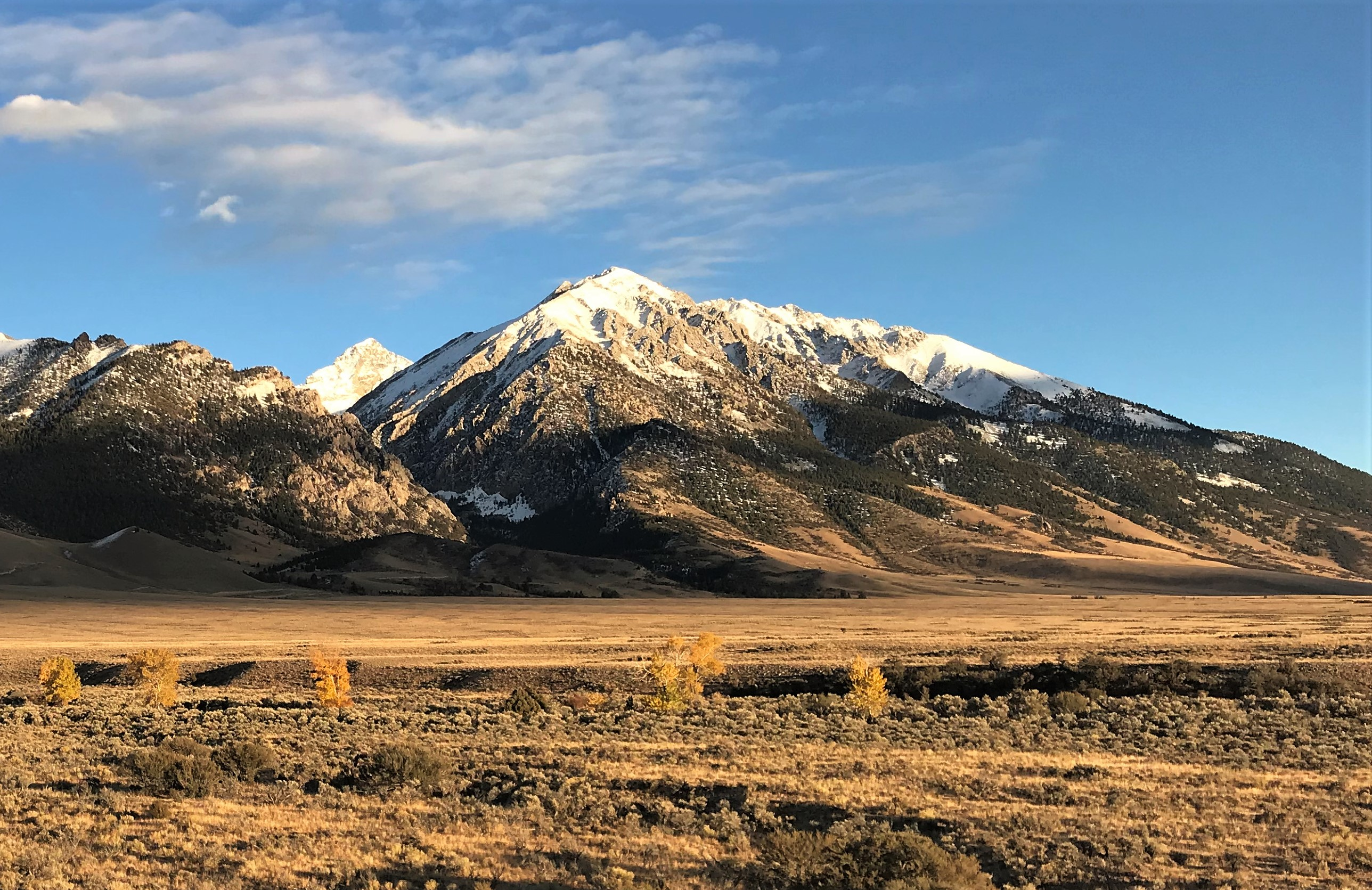
West aspect

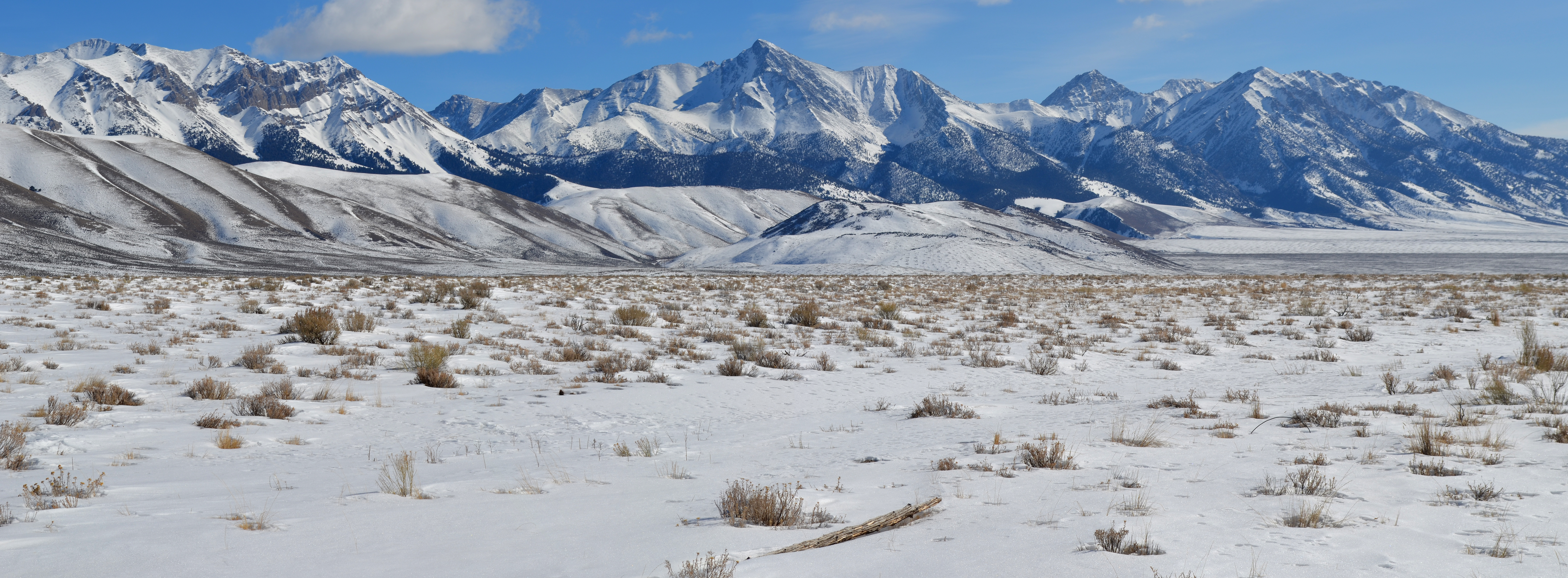
Lost River Range. Borah Peak centered, Mount Morrison furthest to right, with Mount Idaho between those two.

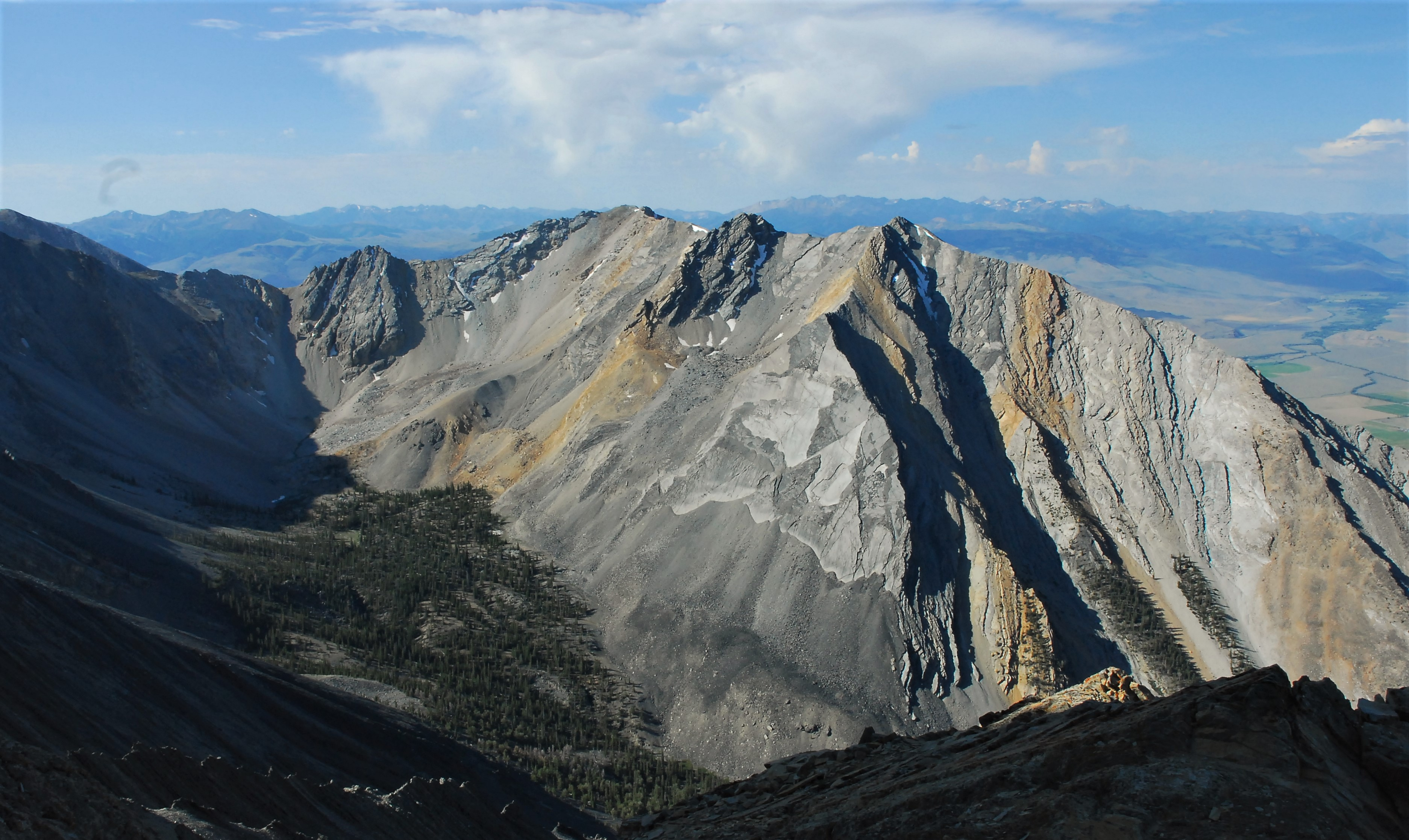
Northeast aspect from Borah Peak
