= Shirshov Institute of Oceanology =

Russian institute of Oceanology

Coordinates: 55°40′37″N 37°34′08″E

- Institute of Oceanology named after. P.P. Shirshov RAS
- Институт океанологии им. П.П. Ширшова РАН
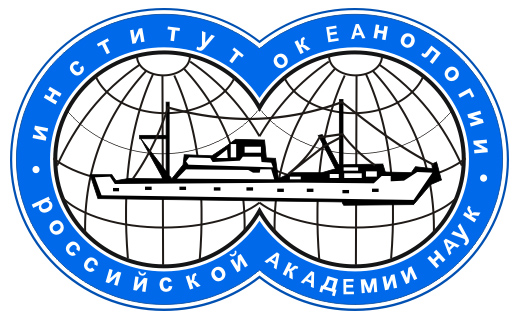

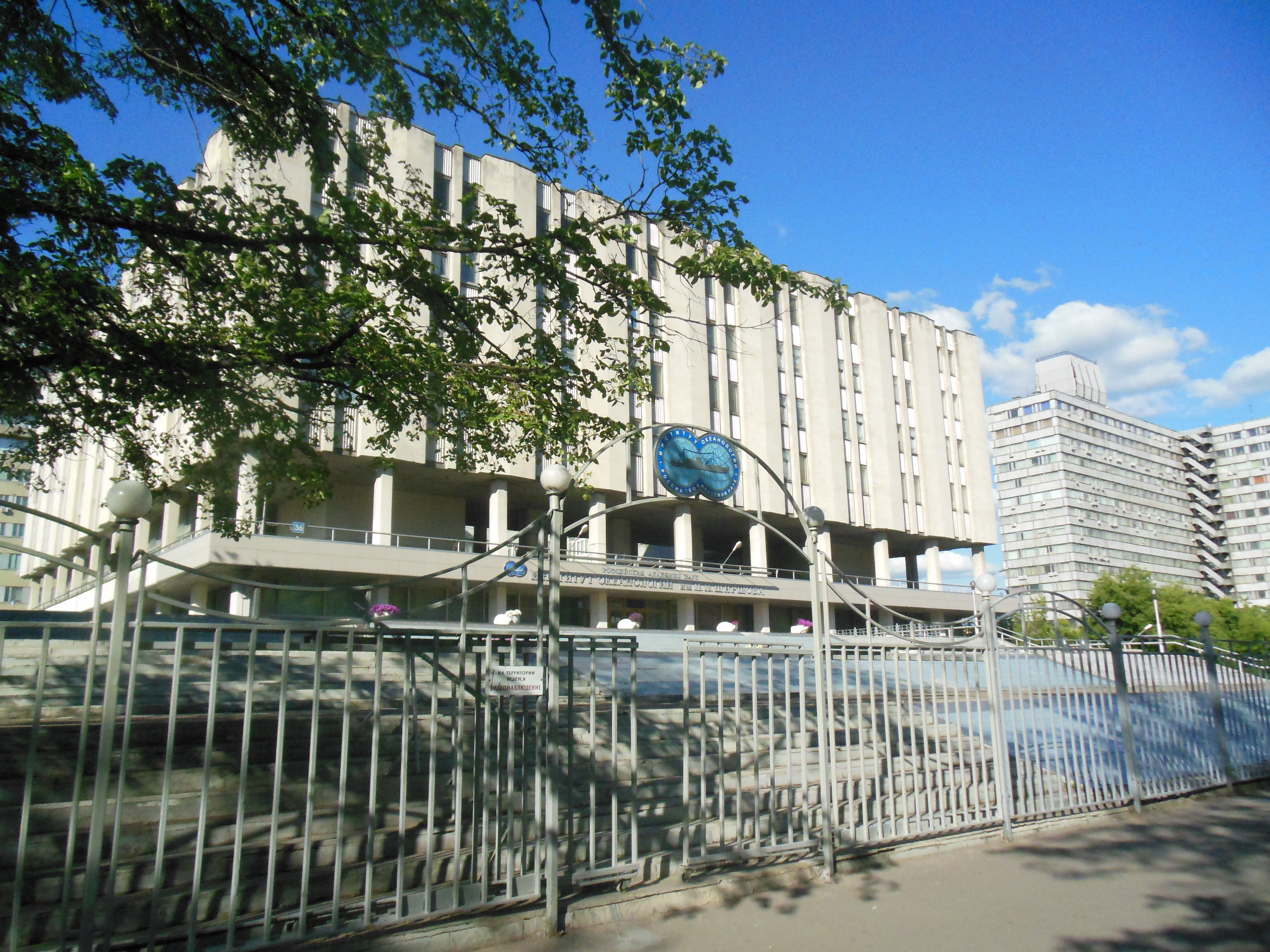
- Named after: Pyotr Petrovich Shirshov
- Formation: January 31, 1946; 80 years ago
- Purpose: Ocean Research and Technological Development
- Location: Moscow, Russia
- Parent organization: Russian Academy of Sciences
- Affiliations: Moscow Institute of Physics and Technology; Moscow State University; Immanuel Kant Baltic Federal University
- Website: ocean.ru

The Shirshov Institute of Oceanology (P.P. Shirshov Institute of Oceanology (IO) RAN, Russian: Федеральное государственное бюджетное учреждение науки Институт океанологии имени П. П. Ширшова Российской академии наук (ИО РАН) or Институт океанологии им. П. П. Ширшова РАН) is the premier research institution for ocean, climate, and earth science in Russia. It was established in 1946 and is part of the Russian Academy of Sciences. It is headquartered in Moscow. The institute is named after Pyotr Shirshov, who founded it in 1946.

== History ==
In January 1941, the Laboratory of Oceanology of the Academy of Sciences of the Soviet Union was founded by researcher Pyotr Shirshov. The organisation was the first institution in the country dedicated to the study of oceanology. These plans were however, disrupted by World War II, with Shirshov being appointed the People's Commissar of the Maritime Fleet.

On 31 January 1946, by decision of the Academy of Sciences, the laboratory was reorganised and formalised as the Institute of Oceanology, with Pyotr Shirshov appointed as the institutes first director. By decision of the presidium, the following areas of research were identified:

- Ocean floor and coastal morphodynamics
- Marine sedimentation
- Ocean currents
- Thermal processes and thermal balance
- General circulation of water and ocean water flows
- Circulation of substances and sea productivity
- Geographical distribution of flora and fauna
- Ecology of ocean organisms

=== Titanic, Bismarck and I-52 ===
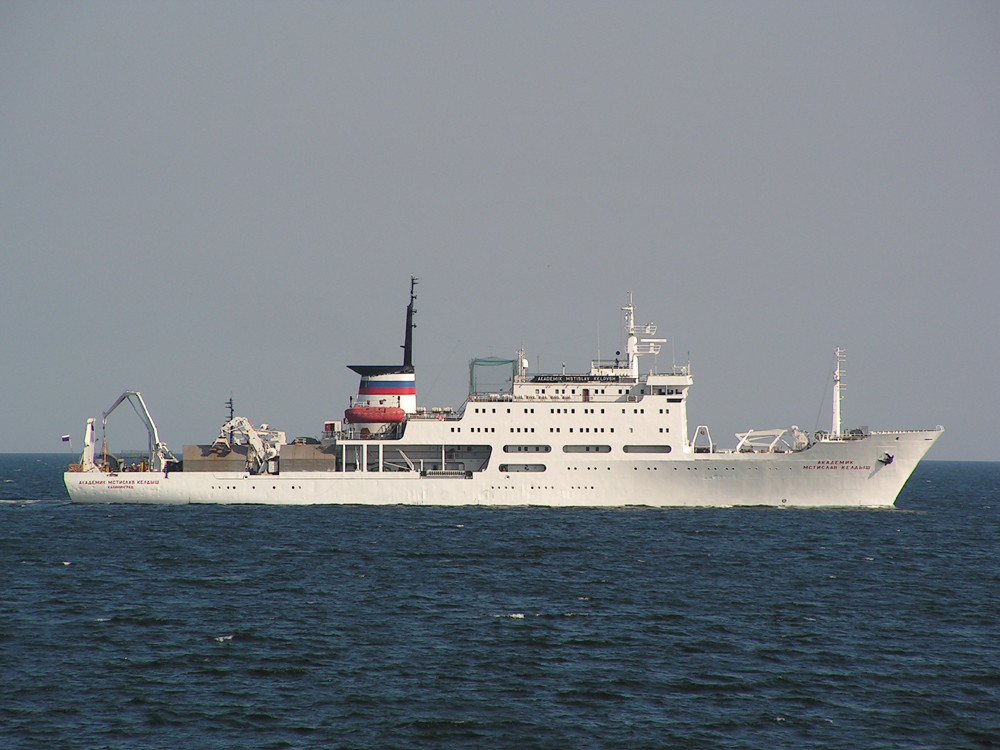
RV Akademik Mstislav Keldysh

Throughout the 1990s, the Institute closely cooperated with the Canadian filmmaker James Cameron on the production of Titanic (1997), providing essential technical assistance through dives to the wreck site, located at a depth of 3,821 metres. A number of dives were conducted from the research vessel Akademik Mstislav Keldysh, conducted by the deep-submergence vehicles Mir-1 and Mir-2, all of which appear in the film. The main pilot of the Mir submersibles was explorer and pilot Anatoly Sagalevich.

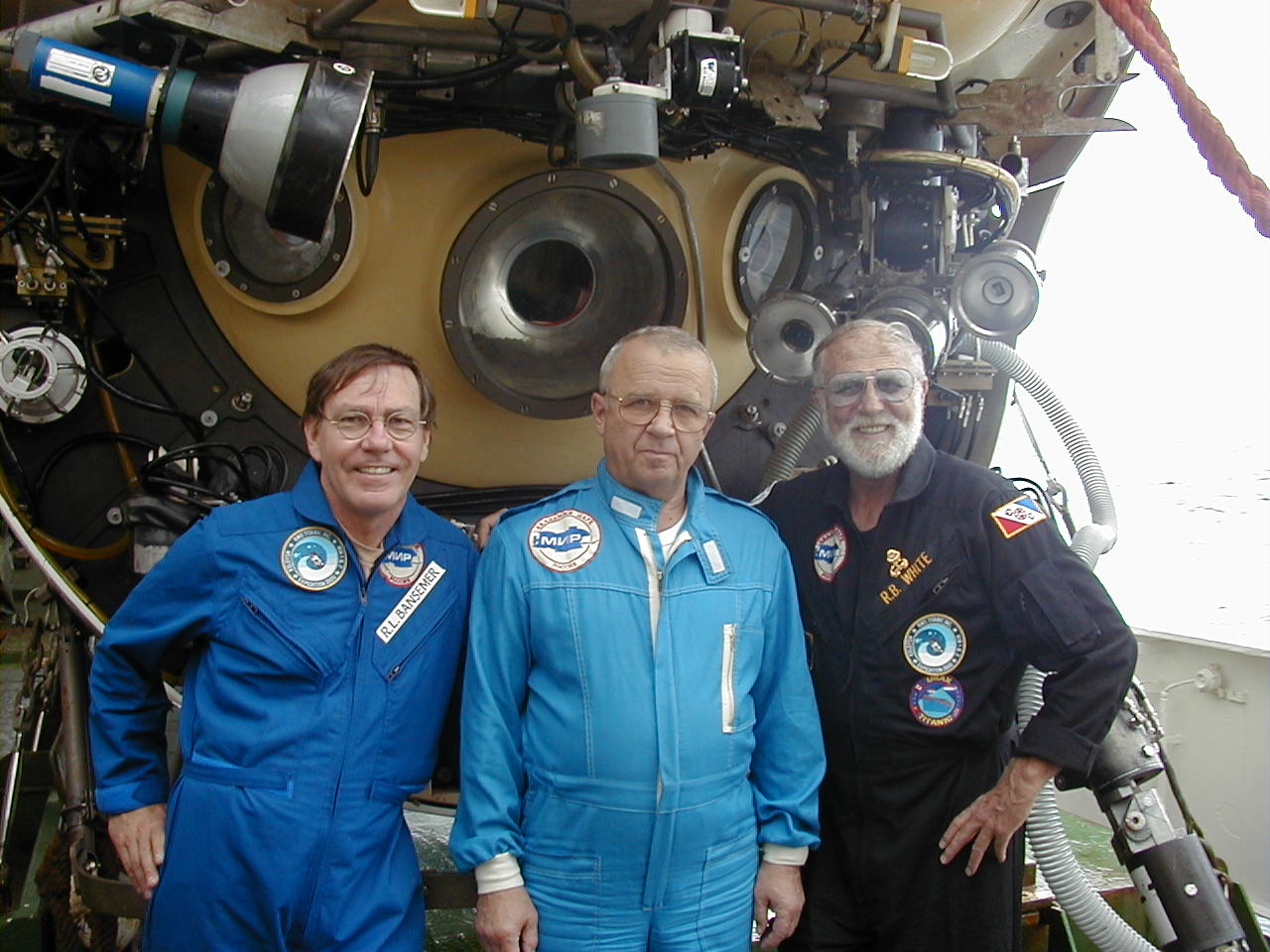
Roger Bansemer, Anatoly Sagalevich and Ralph White alongside Mir-1.

The institute would cooperate with James Cameron for several more expeditions. In 2001, another expedition to the wreck of the Titanic for the documentary Ghosts of the Abyss took place, as well as another in 2002 to the German battleship Bismarck for the Discovery Channel special Expedition: Bismarck. Cameron also led an expedition for his 2005 documentary Aliens of the Deep.

In 1995, Akademik Mstislav Keldysh, alongside the two Mir submersibles embarked on a salvage operation to locate the Japanese submarine I-52 and retrieve her supposed valuable cargo of gold. Despite a number of dives being conducted, no gold was discovered.

In addition, several more expeditions to the Titanic took place in 2000 and 2005 with RMS Titanic Inc.

== Organisational structure ==
=== Directors ===
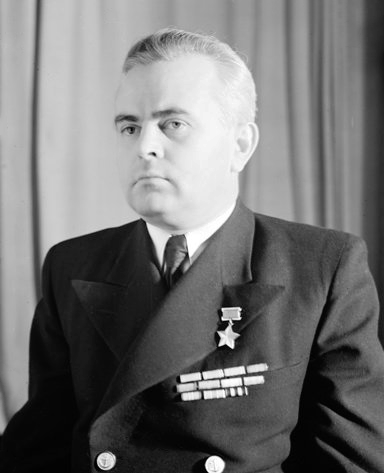
Pyotr Shirshov was the first director of the Institute of Oceanology. Following his passing, the institute was named in his honour.

- Pyotr Petrovich Shirshov, 1946-1953
- Vladimir Grigoryevich Kort, 1953-1965
- Andrei Sergeyevich Monin, 1965-1987
- Vyacheslav Semenovich Yastrebov, 1987-1992
- Leonid Alekseevich Savostin, 1992-1994
- Sergey Sergeevich Lappo, 1994-2006
- Robert Iskanderovich Nigmatulin, 2006-2017
- Alexey Valentinovich Sokov, 2017-2023
- Vladimir Petrovich Shevchenko, 2023-present

=== Founding members ===
- Pyotr Petrovich Shirshov
- Veniamin Grigorievich Bogorov
- Georgy Alekseevich Ushakov
- Ivan Dmitrievich Papanin
- Lev Alexandrovich Zenkevich
- Panteleimon Leonidovich Bezrukov
- Semyon Vladimirovich Bruevich
- Vladimir Borisovich Shtokman
- Nikolai Nikolaevich Sysoev
- Vasily Iosifovich Kalinenko
- Alexey Dmitrievich Dobrovolsky
- Vasily Nikitich Nikitin
- Sergey Vasilievich Suetov
- Pyotr Ivanovich Usachev

=== Branches ===
In addition to its headquarters in Moscow, the Shirshov Institute maintains branches in Kaliningrad, Gelendzhik, Saint Petersburg, Arkhangelsk, Astrakhan and Vladivostok.

=== Research areas ===
As stated, the institute carries out research in the following fields:

- Physics of the ocean
- Marine geology and geophysics
- Marine biology and ecology
- Interaction between the ocean and atmosphere
- Development and testing of technologies for studying and developing the ocean
- Complex research of the polar regions
- Extreme and dangerous phenomena, natural and man-made disasters

== Fleet ==
- RV Akademik Ioffe (ru:Академик Иоффе (судно))
- RV Akademik Sergey Vavilov
- RV Akademik Mstislav Keldysh
- RV Professor Shtokman (ru:Профессор Штокман (судно))
- RV Rift
- RV Akvanaft
- MIR (submersible)
- RV Vityaz - not active since 1979; now a museum in Kaliningrad.

== Notable researchers ==
=== Biologists ===
- Igor Akimushkin (d. 1993)
- Kir Nesis (1934–2003)

=== Climate scientists ===
- Olga Zolina

=== Mathematicians ===
- Grigory Barenblatt (d. 2018)
- Andrei Monin, Director of the Institute 1965-1987 (d. 2007)

=== Physical oceanographers ===
- Leonid Brekhovskikh (d. 2005)
- Vladimir Shtokman (d. 1968)

=== Others ===
- Anatoly Sagalevich, explorer and pilot of the MIR submersible to the seabed under the North Pole (the Arktika 2007 project)
- Alexander Gorodnitsky, poet and geologist

== See also ==
- Nikolai M. Knipovich Polar Research Institute of Marine Fisheries and Oceanography
- List of Russian oceanographers
