= Edwards Island (Wisconsin) =

River island in Wisconsin, USA

Coordinates: 44°22′19″N 89°50′56″W

Edwards Island is a river island in Wood County, Wisconsin. The island is on the Wisconsin River within Wisconsin Rapids city limits.

Edwards Island was named after John Edwards, a former owner of the site.
