= Igor Akimushkin =

Soviet zoologist and writer

Igor Ivanovich Akimushkin
- Born: May 2, 1929; Moscow
- Died: April 19, 1993 (aged 63); Moscow
- Education: Moscow State University
- Occupations: Biologist, writer
- Employer: Institute of Oceanology
- Known for: the author of popular scientific books about the life of animals (Six-volume series «The World of Animals»)

Igor Ivanovich Akimushkin (Russian: Игорь Иванович Акимушкин; May 1, 1929 – 1993) was a Soviet zoologist and writer.

Born in Moscow, he graduated the biological faculty of Moscow State University in 1952. His first books, Tracks of beast you never met and Following the Legends, were published in 1961.

Igor Akimushkin wrote a large number of popular science books and made a significant contribution to science and made some discoveries by exploring the marine life. Most of his works were translated to other languages. The squid Cycloteuthis akimushkini was named in honour of Igor Akimushkin in 1968 by fellow zoologist Filippova.

His most well known work is the six volume World of Animals.

He worked at the Shirshov Institute of Oceanology, Russian Academy of Sciences.
