= Mount Morrison (Enderby Land) =

Mountain in Antarctica

Coordinates: 66°48′S 51°27′E

Mount Morrison is a mountain 1.5 nautical miles (3 km) northeast of Mount Best, in the Tula Mountains of Enderby Land in Antarctica. It was plotted from air photos taken from Australian National Antarctic Research Expeditions aircraft in 1956 and was named by the Antarctic Names Committee of Australia for Murdo Campbell Morrison, from Lionel, Isle of Lewis, Outer Hebrides, a member of the crew of the Discovery during the British Australian New Zealand Antarctic Research Expedition of 1929–31.
