= Edwards Islet =

There are at least two islands called Edwards Islet:

- Edwards Islet (Tasmania), in Australia
- Edwards Islet (Ducie Islands), in the Pitcairn Islands
