= Mount Riiser-Larsen =

Mountain in Antarctica

Mount Riiser-Larsen (66°47′S 50°40′E) is a prominent mountain, 870 m, standing at the northwest end of the Tula Mountains on the east side of Amundsen Bay. It was named by the British Australian New Zealand Antarctic Research Expedition (BANZARE) under Mawson in January 1930 for Captain Hjalmar Riiser-Larsen, the leader of a Norwegian expedition in the Norvegia which also explored the area in that season.
