= Mount Storer =

Mountain in Antarctica

Mount Storer (66°53′S 51°0′E) is a jagged peak in the Tula Mountains, 4 nautical miles (7 km) east-northeast of Mount Harvey. It was sighted from Observation Island in October 1956 by an ANARE (Australian National Antarctic Research Expeditions) party led by P.W. Crohn. It was named by the Antarctic Names Committee of Australia (ANCA) for William Storer, a radio operator at Mawson Station in 1954.
