= Mount Keyser =

Mountain in Enderby Land, Antarctica

Mount Keyser (66°56′S 52°23′E) is a mountain 3 nautical miles (6 km) east of Mount Ryder, in the eastern part of the Tula Mountains in Enderby Land, Antarctica. It was plotted from air photos taken from Australian National Antarctic Research Expeditions aircraft in 1957, and was named by the Antarctic Names Committee of Australia for D.O. Keyser, a radio officer at Mawson Station in 1961.
