= Mount Gleadell =

Mountain in Enderby Land, Antarctica

Mount Gleadell (66°57′S 50°27′E) is a nearly conical ice-free peak, 560 metres (1,840 ft) high, the highest summit on the headland just north of Observation Island at the east side of Amundsen Bay, Antarctica. It was sighted in October 1956 by an Australian National Antarctic Research Expeditions party under P.W. Crohn, and was named for Geoffrey Gleadell, a cook at Mawson Station in 1954.
