= Ardery Island =

Island in Antarctica

- Location within Antarctica

Geography
- Location: Antarctica
- Coordinates: 66°22′S 110°27′E
- Archipelago: Windmill Islands
- Length: 1 km (0.6 mi)
- Width: 0.5 km (0.31 mi)
- Highest elevation: 113 m (371 ft)

Administration
- Administered under the Antarctic Treaty System

Demographics
- Population: Uninhabited

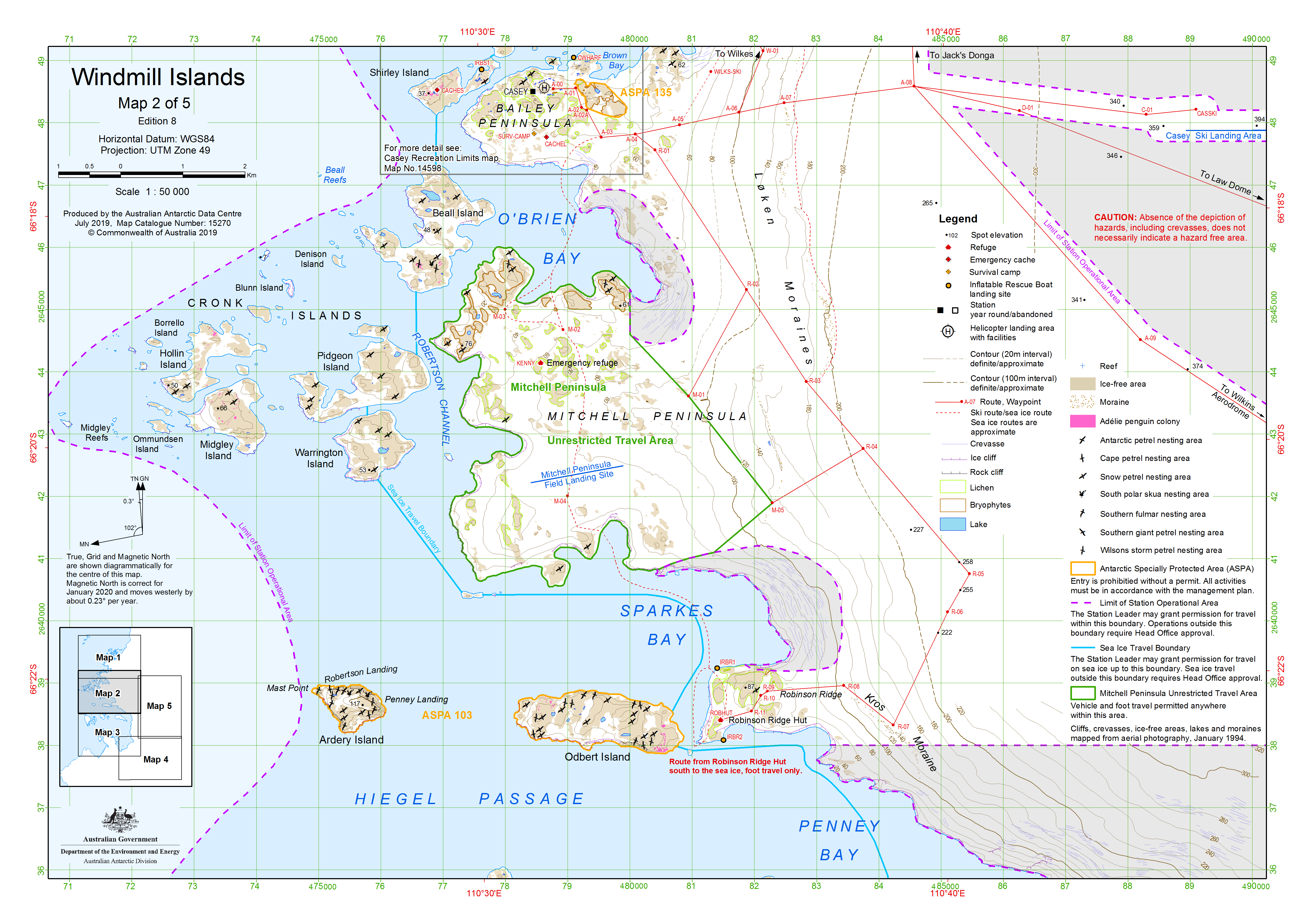

Ardery Island is a steep, rocky island, about 1 km (0.62 mi) long, lying 1.8 km (1.1 mi) west of Odbert Island in the Windmill Islands of Antarctica.

== History ==
The island was first mapped from air photos taken by the US Navy's Operation Highjump and Operation Windmill in 1947 and 1948. It was named by the US Advisory Committee on Antarctic Names (US-ACAN) for Major E. R. Ardery, an Army Corps of Engineers observer who assisted Windmill parties in establishing astronomical control stations between Wilhelm II Coast and Budd Coast during the 1947–48 season.

Cave Ravine is a ravine in the western part of the island. It was first mapped by Operation Highjump and later visited in 1961 by M. N. Orton, a medical officer at Wilkes Station. It was so named by the Antarctic Names Committee of Australia (ANCA) for a cave in the western wall of the ravine. Cave Landing is an ice foot near Cave Ravine which affords a boat landing in spring and summer. It was discovered by Orton during his visit to Cave Ravine, and named by ANCA. Orton Cave is a cave in the western wall of Cave Ravine, also discovered by Orton, for whom it was named by ANCA.

Mast Point is the westernmost point of the island. It was named by US-ACAN for Clarence W. Mast, a member of the Wilkes Station party of 1958.

Hiegel Passage is the sea passage between Ardery Island and Holl and Ford Islands to the south. It was named by the US-ACAN for Commander James A. Hiegel, leader of Mobile Construction Battalion Number One, who supervised the construction of Wilkes Station in February 1957.

== Antarctic Specially Protected Area ==
Ardery Island, along with nearby Odbert Island, is protected under the Antarctic Treaty System as Antarctic Specially Protected Area (ASPA) No.103 because they support several breeding species of petrel and provide examples of their habitat, notably that of Antarctic petrels and southern fulmars. The site has also been identified as an Important Bird Area by BirdLife International on the basis of the numbers of seabirds present.

== See also ==
- List of Antarctic and subantarctic islands
- Penney Landing - toward the eastern end of the northern side of Ardery Island
- Robertson Landing - landing on the north side of the island
