= Tula Mountains =

Mountain range in Enderby Land, Antarctica

Coordinates: 66°54′S 51°6′E

Tula Mountains in Enderby Land, Antarctica

The Tula Mountains are a group of extensive mountains lying immediately eastward of Amundsen Bay in Enderby Land, Antarctica. They were discovered on January 14, 1930, by the British Australian New Zealand Antarctic Research Expedition (BANZARE) under Mawson and named "Tula Range" by him after John Biscoe's brig, the Tula, from which Biscoe discovered Enderby Land in 1831. The term "mountains" was recommended for the group following an ANARE (Australian National Antarctic Research Expeditions) sledge survey in 1958 by G.A. Knuckey.

== Named Tula mountains ==
- Mount Bartlett
- Mount Bond
- Mount Degerfeldt
- Mount Denham
- Mount Dungey
- Mount Hampson
- Mount Hardy
- Mount Harvey
- Mount Henksen
- Mount Keyser
- Mount King
- Mount Letten
- Mount Lunde
- Mount Mateer
- Mount Morrison
- Mount Parviainen
- Mount Porteus
- Pythagoras Peak
- Mount Reed
- Mount Renouard
- Mount Rhodes
- Mount Riiser-Larsen
- Mount Ryder
- Mount Selwood
- Mount Shirshov
- Mount Sones
- Mount Storer

== See also ==
- Gage Ridge
