= Amundsen Bay =

Embayment in Enderby Land, Antarctica

Coordinates: 66°55′S 50°0′E

Amundsen Bay, also known as Ice Bay, is a long embayment 39 kilometres (24 mi) wide, close west of the Tula Mountains in Enderby Land, Antarctica. The bay was seen as a large pack-filled recession in the coastline by Sir Douglas Mawson on 14 January 1930. Seen by Captain Hjalmar Riiser-Larsen in charge of a Norwegian expedition during an airplane flight on 15 January and subsequently mapped nearer its true position by the Norwegians. The bay was mapped in detail by an Australian National Antarctic Research Expeditions party landed by aircraft in 1956 and another landed by launch from Thala Dan in February 1958. It was named by Mawson after Roald Amundsen, the Norwegian explorer who was first to reach the South Pole.

== See also ==
- Adams Fjord
- Ragged Peaks, group of peaks on the eastern side of Amundsen Bay
