= Tilley Nunatak =

Nunatuk in Antarctica

Tilley Nunatak (67°24′S 60°3′E) is a bold, rocky outcrop 5 nautical miles (9 km) south of Hobbs Islands, projecting from the coastal ice cliffs eastward of William Scoresby Bay. Discovered in February 1936 by DI personnel on the William Scoresby and named by them for Professor C.E. Tilley, who studied the rock specimens brought back by the expedition.

== See also ==
- Tilley Bay
- Uksen Island
