= Ives Tongue =

Tongue of land in Antarctica

Coordinates: 67°22′S 59°29′E

Ives Tongue is a narrow tongue of land projecting from an island between Fold Island and the coast of Kemp Land, Antarctica. It was discovered and named in February 1936 by a Discovery Investigations expedition on the RRS William Scoresby.

== See also ==
- Mount Whiteside
