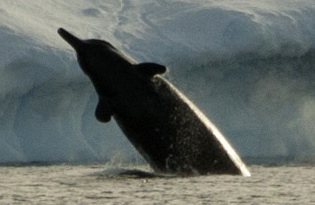
- Photo of Arnoux's beaked whale
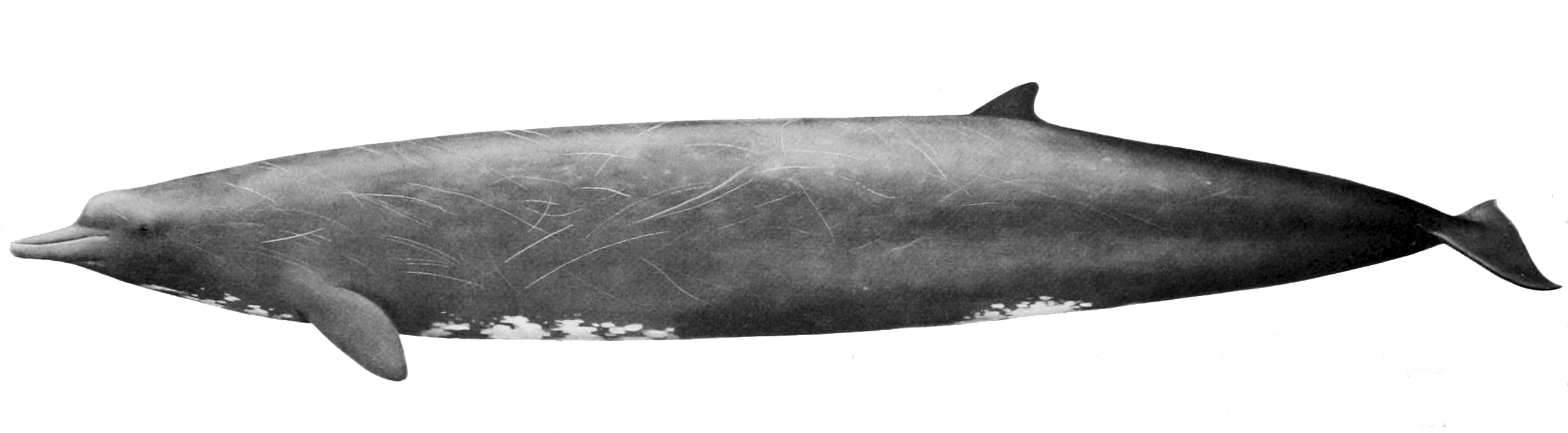
- Illustration of Baird's beaked whale

Scientific classification
- Kingdom: Animalia
- Phylum: Chordata
- Class: Mammalia
- Order: Artiodactyla
- Infraorder: Cetacea
- Family: Ziphiidae
- Subfamily: Berardiinae
- Genus: Berardius; Duvernoy, 1851

Type species
- Berardius arnuxii Duvernoy, 1851

Species
- Berardius arnuxii Duvernoy, 1851(type); Berardius bairdii Stejneger, 1883; Berardius minimus Yamada, 2019; †Berardius kobayashii Kawatani & Kohno, 2021
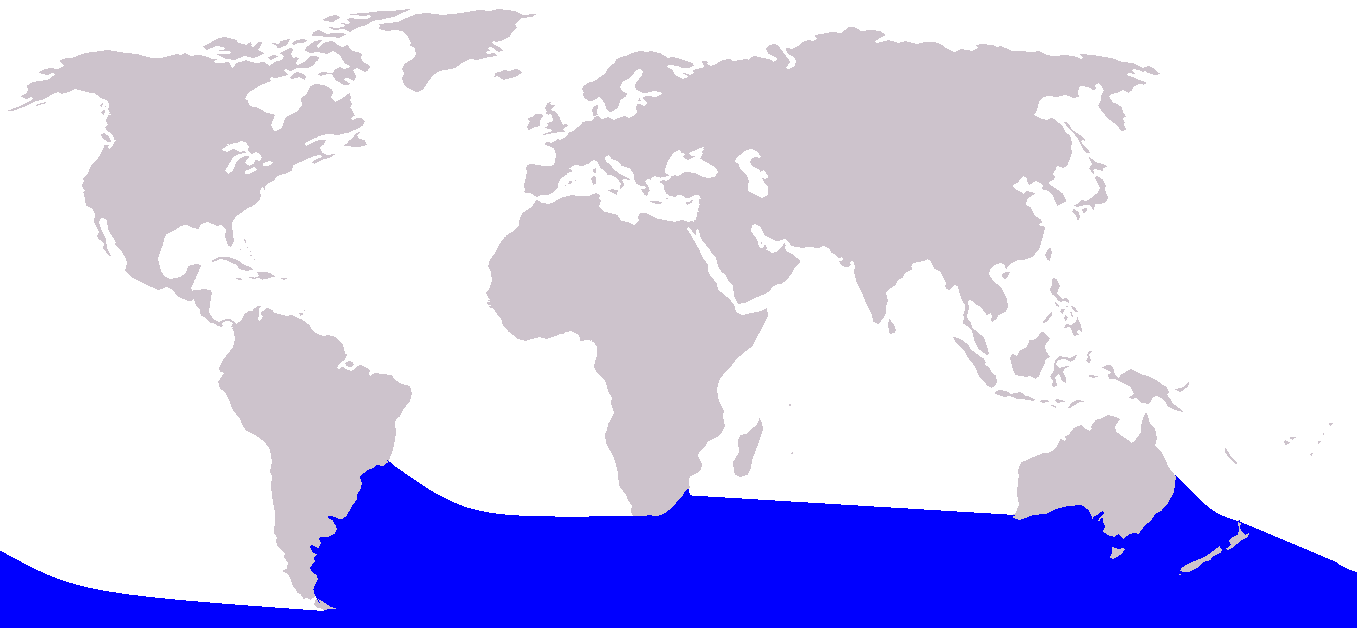
- Arnoux's beaked whale range
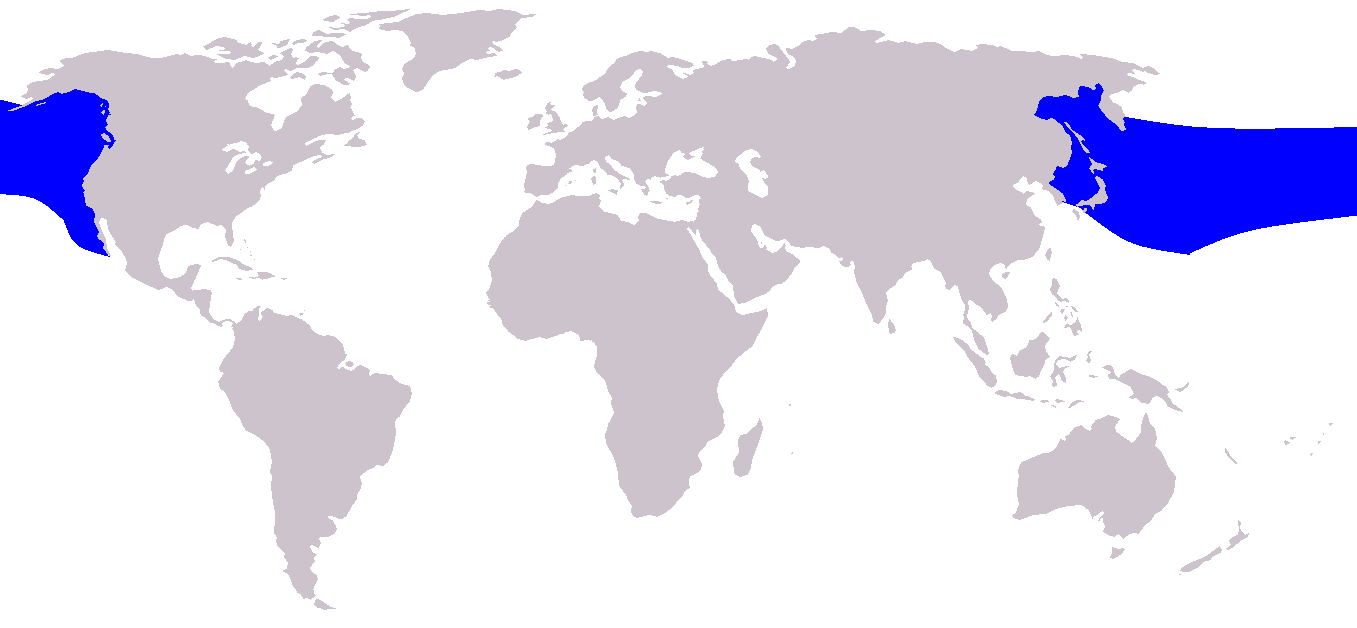
- Baird's beaked whale range

= Berardius =

Berardius Temporal range: Middle Miocene to present, 11.5–0 Ma

Genus of mammals

The four-toothed whales or giant beaked whales are beaked whales in the genus Berardius. They include Arnoux's beaked whale (Berardius arnuxii) in cold Southern Hemispheric waters, and Baird's beaked whale (Berardius bairdii) in the cold temperate waters of the North Pacific. A third species, Sato's beaked whale (Berardius minimus), was distinguished from B. bairdii in the 2010s.

Arnoux's and Baird's beaked whales are so similar that researchers have debated whether or not they are simply two populations of the same species. However, genetic evidence and their wide geographical separation has led them to be classified as separate. Lifespan estimates, based on earwax plug samples, indicate male whales can live up to 84 years, while females can have a lifespan of 54 years. It is estimated that the length at birth is ~4 metres (13 ft). Growing up to ~10 metres (33 ft), these are the largest whales belonging to the family Ziphiidae. Sato's beaked whale is much smaller, with adult males having a length of ~7 metres (23 ft).

While Berardius arnuxii and Berardius bairdii are considered least concern by the IUCN, Berardius minimus is labeled as near threatened as of 2023.

This article currently largely treats four-toothed whales as monospecific, due to a lack of species-specific information.

== Species overview ==
Berardius was once classified as containing only two species: Arnoux's beaked whale (Berardius arnuxii) in the Southern Hemisphere waters, and Baird's beaked whale (Berardius bairdii) in the North Pacific. Arnoux's beaked whale was described by Georges Louis Duvernoy in 1851. The genus name honors admiral Auguste Bérard (1796–1852), who was captain of the French corvette Le Rhin (1842–1846), which brought back the type specimen to France where Duvernoy analyzed it; the species name honors Maurice Arnoux, the ship's surgeon who found the skull of the type specimen on a beach near Akaroa, New Zealand. Baird's beaked whale was first described by Leonhard Hess Stejneger in 1883 from a four-toothed skull he had found on Bering Island the previous year. The species is named for Spencer Fullerton Baird, a past Secretary of the Smithsonian Institution.

Researchers have debated over whether the northern and southern populations represent distinct species or whether they are simply geographic variants. Several morphological characters have been suggested to distinguish them, but the validity of each has been disputed; currently, it seems that there are no significant skeletal or external differences between the two forms, except for the smaller size of the southern specimens known to date. The morphological similarity gave rise to the hypothesis that the populations were sympatric as recently as the last Pleistocene Ice Age, approximately 15,000 years ago, but subsequent genetic analyses suggest otherwise. Phylogenetic analyses of the mitochondrial DNA control region (D-loop) revealed that Baird's and Arnoux's beaked whales were reciprocally monophyletic — lineages from each of the species grouped together to the exclusion of lineages from the other species. Diagnostic DNA substitutions were also found. These results are consistent with the current classification of Baird's and Arnoux's beaked whales as distinct species. Further, the degree of differentiation between the northern and southern forms of Berardius suggest that the species may already have been separated for several million years.

It is speculated that the Baird's and Arnoux's whales separated from one another after their common ancestor separated from the kurotsuchi; however, this is not certain. The Berardius sp. are deep divers that can spend long periods of time submerged below the surface of the water and thus are difficult to study.

=== Possible species ===
Sightings during whale watching tours and studies of stranded individuals suggest the possibility of another form of Berardius in the Sea of Okhotsk inclusive of the coast of northern Hokkaido especially around Shiretoko Peninsula and off Abashiri, or to Sea of Japan off Korean Peninsula and north pacific and Bering Sea off Alaska. These whales are generally much smaller than known species (6–7 m or 20–23 ft), darker in color, and inhabit shallow waters closer to coastal areas, enough to be trapped within fixed nets for salmon. Local whalers had called them "kurotsuchi" (= black Berardius) or "karasu" (= ravens); it is not known whether these terms are synonyms or identify two separate species. Genetic studies indicate that kurotsuchi are Berardius minimus, recognized as a distinct species in 2019.

"Bottlenose whales in the Sea of Okhotsk" had been reported since the time of the Soviet Union's whaling, and an unknown type of beaked whale resembling Baird's beaked whales having four tusks on upper and lower jaws has also been recorded by traditional whalers in Japan. It is unknown whether these records correspond with this new form.

An unknown type of large beaked whale of similar size to fully grown Berardius bairdii have been reported to live in the Sea of Okhotsk, somewhat resembling Longman's beaked whale. The "Moore's Beach monster", an initially unidentified carcass found in 1925 on Moore's Beach on Monterey Bay, was identified by the California Academy of Sciences as a Baird's beaked whale. There have been claims that records of strandings of these whales exist along the areas within and adjacent to Tatar Strait in the 2010s.

== Physical description ==
Size of Baird's beaked whale compared to an average human

Size of Arnoux's beaked whale compared to an average human

Size of Sato's beaked whale compared to a human

The two established species, Baird's and Arnoux's beaked whales, have very similar features and would be indistinguishable at sea if they did not exist in disjoint locations. Both whales reach similar sizes, have bulbous melons, and long prominent beaks. Their lower jaw is longer than the upper, and once sexual maturity is reached the front teeth are visible even when the mouth is fully closed. The Baird's and Arnoux's beaked whales are the only whales in the Ziphiidae family where both sexes have erupted teeth. The teeth in the Ziphiidae are presumed to be used by the males for fighting and competition for females. Ziphiidae has the most prevalent and pronounced markings caused by teeth scaring among the cetaceans. Front-facing teeth may be covered in barnacles after many years.

Baird's and Arnoux's beaked whales have similarly shaped small flippers with rounded tips, and small dorsal fins that sit far back on their body. Adult males and females of both species pick up numerous white linear scars all over the body as they age, and these may be a rough indicator of age. These traits are similar in both sexes, as there is little sexual dimorphism in either species. Among the observed differences in the sexes is their size: female Baird's and Arnoux giant beaked whales are slightly larger than the males.

Although fairly similar, there exist some differences between the species. Baird's beaked whales are around 4.6 metres (15 ft) when born, and can reach lengths of 11.1 metres (36 ft) as adults, making them the largest members of the beaked whale family. Members of the Baird's species have fairly narrow body shapes despite their large size, and have dorsal fins that are rounded at the tips. Their coloration is fairly uniform and can range from brown to grey. Arnoux's beaked whales are around 4 metres (13 ft) long as calves and can reach lengths up to 9.75 metres (32 ft) as adults. Their bodies are not as narrow as the Baird's, and resemble a spindle. Unlike the Baird's beaked whale, Arnoux's have slightly hooked dorsal fins. Arnoux's beaked whales have a dark coloration that ranges from brown to orange due to a buildup of algae on its body.

A third species, B. minimus, (known by the Japanese common name "kurotsuchi", which means "black Berardius") was formally named in 2019, after being distinguished in 2016, based on differences in haplotypes from mtDNA. It generally has a short beak (~4% body length). While other four-toothed whales are generally grey with scars, kurotsuchis usually have few linear scars, so that the dark, smooth skin contrasts highly with round, white scars of about 5 cm diameter (from cookiecutter shark bites). The tip of the rostrum is also white. The kurotsuchi is shorter than other four-toothed whales, around 6–7 metres (20–23 ft) long at maturity, hence the species name, B. minimus (="smallest"). No females of this species have yet been described in the research literature.

== Population and distribution ==
The total population is not known for two of the three species. Estimates for Baird's are of the order of 30,000 individuals. Nothing is known at all about the population size of the third species of Berardius, first scientifically described in the 2010s. Baird's and Arnoux's beaked whales have an allopatric (non-overlapping) antitropical distribution; kurotsuchis are known to live in the North Pacific.

=== Arnoux's ===
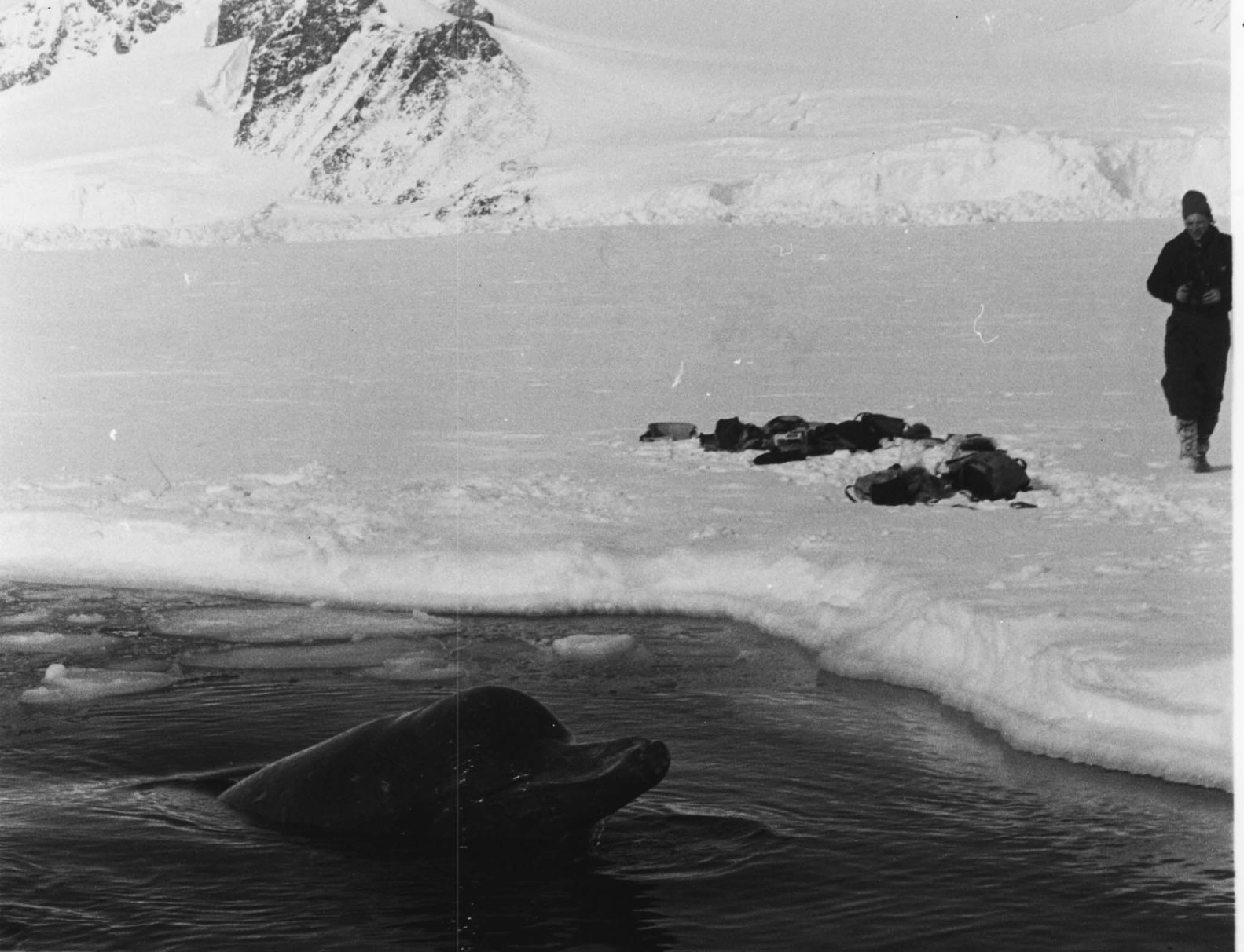
An Arnoux's beaked whale spyhopping to investigate a researcher in Antarctica.

Arnoux's beaked whales inhabit great tracts of the Southern Ocean. Large groups of animals, pods of up to 47 individuals, have been observed off Kemp Land, Antarctica. Beachings in New Zealand and Argentina indicate the whale may be relatively common in the Southern Ocean between those countries and Antarctica; sporadic sightings have been recorded in polar waters, such as in McMurdo Sound. It has also been spotted close to South Georgia and South Africa, indicating a likely circumpolar distribution. The northernmost stranding was at 34 degrees south, indicating the whales inhabit cool and temperate, as well as polar, waters. There is no stock report for the Arnoux's beaked whale to date by NOAA.

=== Baird's ===
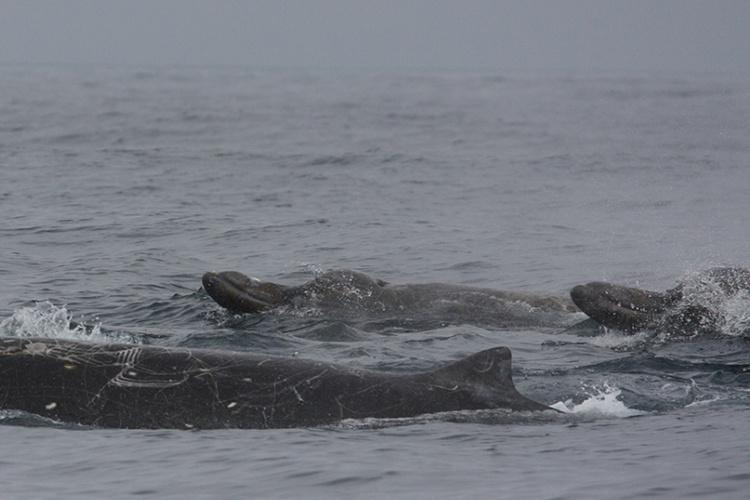

Baird's beaked whale is found in the North Pacific Ocean, the Sea of Japan and the southern part of the Sea of Okhotsk. They appear to prefer seas over steep cliffs at the edge of the continental shelf, but are known to migrate to oceanic islands and to near shore waters where deep cliffs locate next to landmasses such as at Rishiri Island and in Tsugaru Strait, Shiretoko Peninsula, Tokyo Bay, and Toyama Bay.

The continental shelf was reported in the Alaska stock report as the whales migrate to the shelf in the summer months when the water temperature are at the highest. According to the California/Oregon/Washington NOAA stock assessment report the Baird's beaked whales can be found in the deep waters along the continental slopes of the North Pacific Ocean. They are often seen along the slope between late spring to early fall.

Specimens have been recorded as far north as the Bering Sea and as far south as the Baja California Peninsula. They are also found on the east side and the southern islands (Izu and Bonin Islands) of Japan on the west although it is unclear whether records at these islands are of Berardius bairdii. Southern limits of historical occurrences in east Asian were unclear, while there had been either a stranding or a catch in East China Sea at Zhoushan Islands in the 1950s, and was a disentanglement at Kamae, Ōita. Whales off the east coast of North America seems to approach coasts less frequently than in the western North Pacific, but they may travel further south than in Japan. Historical distributions of southward migrations or vagrants in Asian waters are unknown as the whales wintering from Bōsō Peninsula and in Tokyo Bay to Sagami Bay and around Izu Ōshima have been severely depleted or nearly wiped out by modern whaling (recently whalers shifted their major hunting grounds from Bōsō Peninsula to further north due to the very small numbers of whales still migrating to the former habitats). Within the Sea of Japan, the first scientific approaches to the species were made in Peter the Great Gulf, and the whales can widely distribute more on Japanese archipelago from west of Rebun Island to west of Oki Islands on unknown regularities, and major whaling grounds were in Toyama Bay and Oshima Peninsula.

Baird's beaked whales are not found in southern Chinese waters because they prefer cooler waters, but may be seasonal in colder northern waters. Capture records by Japanese whalers suggest that there may have been historical migrant groups of Baird's beaked whales that once regularly reached the Yellow and Bohai Seas, especially around the island of Lingshan off Jiaozhou Bay and off Dalian, This may have included regions at least as far south as the Zhoushan archipelago. 12 individuals were caught as by-catch along the east coasts of the Korean Peninsula between 1996 and 2012. Canada; Japan; Korea, Democratic People's Republic of Korea; Mexico; Russian; United States, (Taylor et al. 2008). Endemic to the North Pacific Ocean and the adjacent seas. There are two different stocks of Baird beaked whales that the National Oceanic and Atmospheric Administration (NOAA) keeps track of for management of the species, the Alaska stock and the California-Oregon-Washington stock. (NOAA website). According to the Alaska 2017 stock report, the range of the Baird's beaked whale is north of the Cape Navarn (62^{o} N) and Central Sea of Okhotsk (57^{o} N) that spans to St. Matthew Island, the Pribilof Islands, and the northern Gulf of Alaska. (Alaska Stock assessment report and Balcomb 1989).

The seasonal distribution can be observed when the Baird's beaked whales spend the summer months in the Sea of Okhotsk and the Bering Sea between April–May to October. (Tomilin 1957, Kasuya 2002, Alaska Stock assessment report 2017). The wintering habitats is assumed to be located in the northern Gulf of Alaska which was determined by using acoustic detection, (Baumann-Pickering et al. 2012b. and Alaska Stock assessment report 2017.)

=== Sato's ===
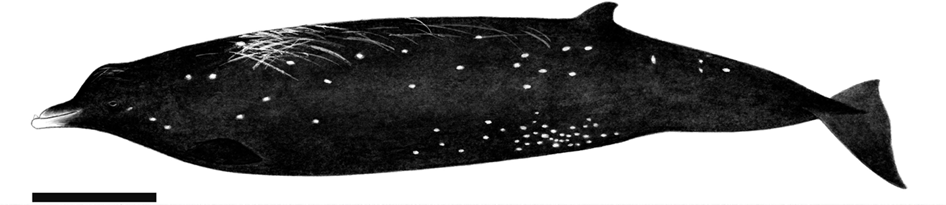

B. minimus is currently known to reside in only the central and western North Pacific Ocean. The species' range includes portions of Japan, Russia, and Alaska, between 40°N and 60°N and 140°E and 160°W. However, this distribution is based primarily on data collected from stranded specimens, and its range may extend further.

== Behavior ==
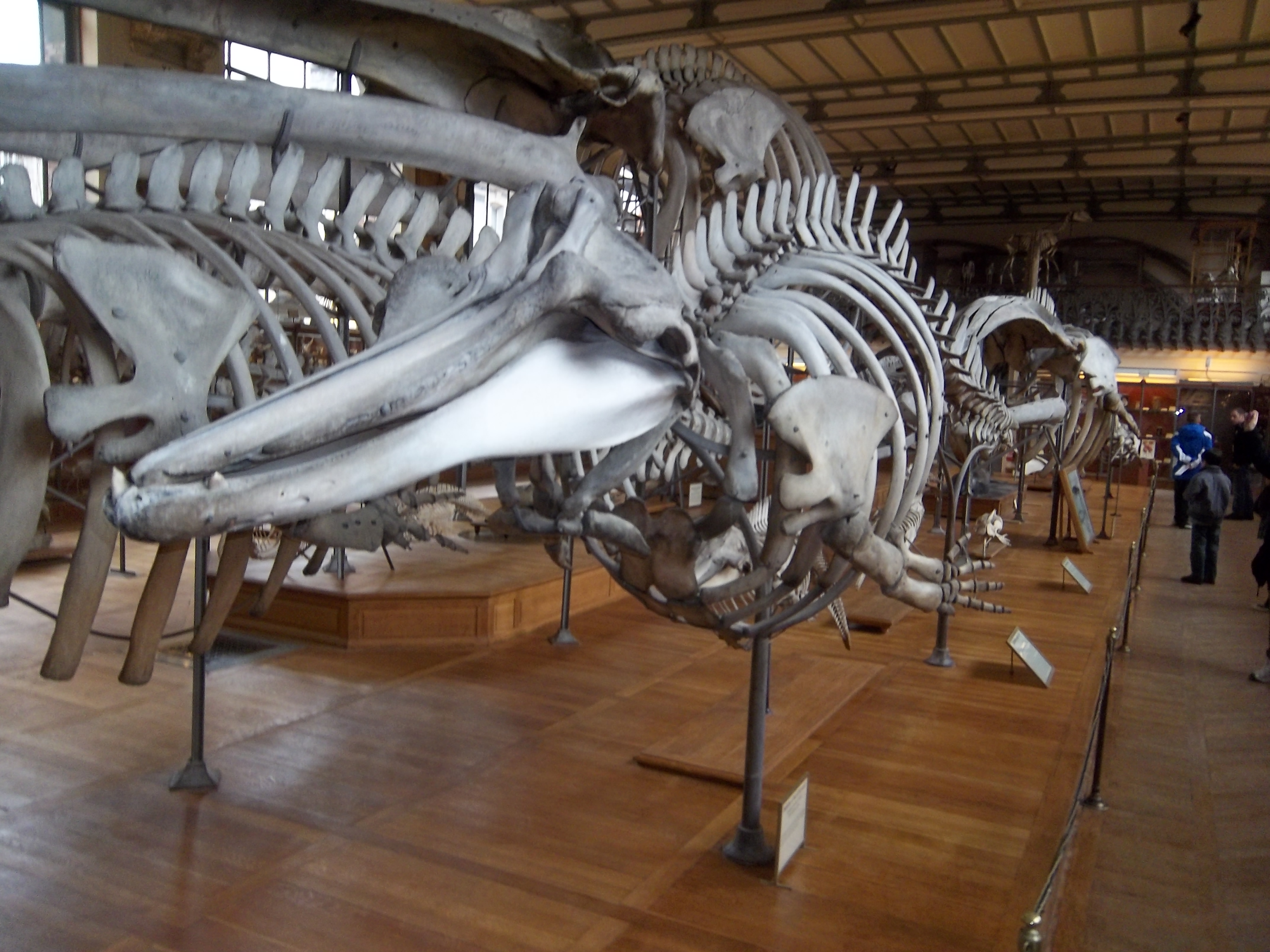
Skeleton of Berardius arnuxii, showing a skull adapted to vocalizations

Little is known about the behavior of Arnoux's beaked whale, but it is expected to be similar to that of Baird's. Distinctions between the two species are so slight that they are speculated to be the same, although genetic makeup and geographic distribution offer evidence otherwise. Baird's beaked whales generally move in pods of 5 to 20 individuals, with groups of 50 observed in rarer circumstances. Congregating groups of Baird's whales are led by a single large male. Scarring among males indicate competition for this leadership position that must entail more breeding opportunities and gives evidence that the species' behaviors portray sexual selection. Potentially one of the deepest diving cetaceans, they can dive for an hour at a time, predating on deep-water and bottom-dwelling fish, cephalopods, and crustaceans. When not diving, they drift along the surface. The deep diving whales can dive to depths of 800–1,200 metres (2,600–3,900 ft), and when feeding, they generally prefer deep waters near the continental shelf or around seamounts, where high biological activity is present in shallower waters. The deepest recorded dive is 1,777 metres (5,830 ft).

Diel variation in behavior suggests that beaked whales spend less time at the surface during the day than they do at night, so as to avoid surface predators like sharks and killer whales. Considering the extent of whaling on the Baird's species, the pod's uninfluenced structure is not well known. To date, two-thirds of the whales caught have been male, despite the fact that females are somewhat larger than males and would be thought to be the preferred targets for whalers. They are listed as least concern under the IUCN Red List and not listed as depleted under the MMPA. They are not being hunted for research due to Japan pulling out of the whaling commission in 2018/2019.

Observations of Arnoux's beaked whales in Doubtful Sound, New Zealand in the same seasons in 2009 and in 2010 indicate that this species may possess a form of bond to locations similar to those of other species such as right whales. Another 4 or 5 sightings have been recorded in the Doubtful Sound between 2007 and in 2011. Underwater recordings, made in the austral summer in the Antarctic of a large group of 47 Arnoux's beaked whales showed that they were highly vociferous animals at this time. The whales produced clicks, click trains, and frequency modulated pulses and whistles which gives their vocalizations a characteristic warbling aural impression. The group swam in coordinated positions along the ice edge, some of them splitting and reassembling.

== Reproduction ==
Mating in Baird's beaked whales happens in the months of October and November and calving occurs in March and April after a 17-month gestational period. Scarring among males indicate competition for leadership position that must entail more breeding opportunities and gives evidence that the species' behaviors portray sexual selection. The sex ratio seems to be skewed in favor of males from observational data; with some observations indicating as high is 3:1. Males are recorded to live longer. Males live 39 years longer than females with the adult sex ratio strongly biases toward males and the female's exhibit high annual ovulation. It is possible that these results are seasonal abundances of different sexes in the region studied. They exhibit a slight reverse sexual dimorphism with females tending to be larger than males in size. The females have no post-reproductive stage. Cetaceans in general have an interbirth interval which is the time between births of new calves. The mysticetes tend to have two or three years or relative to body size intervals whereas the odontocete interbirth intervals are more varied. Baird beaked whales have interbirth intervals which are more similar to mysticetes of their size than with other odontocetes. In July 2006, in the Sea of Cortez, Mexico, there was summer stranding event of 10 males of mixed age composition that was highly suggestive of male alloparental care. Females are slightly larger than the males and exhibit high annual ovulation and pregnancy rates. Males live about 30 years longer than the females with this sex ratio biased toward males it is speculated that the males provide alloparetnel care to offspring which in turn allows the females to have a shorten birth interval frequency.

== Feeding ==
Baird's beaked whale has a diet that consists primarily of deep sea fish and cephalopods found at its preferred dive depths (1000–1777m). On rare occasions, it has been known to eat octopus, lobster, crab, rockfish, herring, starfish, pyrosomes and sea cucumbers. Baird's beaked whales in the southern Sea of Okhotsk diet consists of deep-water gadiform fishes and cephalopods. The species has a mean dive time of about 1 hour, which suggests a long search and handling time. Its generalist feeding strategy may be reflective of limited prey availability at such depths or regions, as mammals become more general feeding strategists as prey diversity decreases. It may also explain the species' migrational patterns around the North Pacific. In summer months, Baird's beaked whale can be found off the Pacific coast of Japan where demersal fish are abundant. Stomach content analysis's found that Baird's beaked whale feeds in benthic zones both day and night. This behavior differs from its other Odontocete relatives (namely the common dolphin and Dall's porpoise) who feed in mesopelagic regions during the day when the light can penetrate the water column. This suggests that Baird's beaked whale does not rely as much on its sense of sight and has evolved to navigate and hunt competently with echolocation. There is little information on the foraging behavior of Baird's beaked whales and their ecological role in the marine ecosystem.

== Conservation ==
Arnoux's beaked whale has rarely been exploited, and although no abundance estimates are available, the population is not believed to be endangered. Arnoux's beaked whale is covered by the Memorandum of Understanding for the Conservation of Cetaceans and Their Habitats in the Pacific Islands Region (Pacific Cetaceans MOU).

Baird's beaked whale is listed by the Mammalogical Society of Japan as rare in Japanese coastal waters. The Baird's beaked whale is listed on Appendix II of the convention on the Conservation of Migratory Species of Wild Animals (CMS). It is listed on Appendix II as it has an unfavorable conservation status or would benefit significantly from international co-operation organised by tailored agreements. It is considered Least Concern by the IUCN. They are not listed as "threatened" or "endangered" under the endangered species act nor depleted under the MMPA. There is preliminary evidence of the Baird's beaked whale being sensitive to anthropogenic aquatic noise pollution, as other odontocete species are. Anthropogenic sound sources such as military sonar and seismic testing. The testing of military sonar has been recorded to effect the diving behavior of beaked whales. This implication on the whales effects their ability to decompress upon surfacing and results in the whales suffering the bends, increase nitrogen gas bubbles in the blood.

In the 20th century, Baird's beaked whales were hunted primarily by Japan and to a lesser extent by the USSR, Canada and the United States. The USSR reported killing 176 before hunting ended in 1974. Canadian and American whalers killed 60 before halting in 1966. Japan killed around 4000 individuals before the 1986 moratorium on whaling (about 300 were killed in the most prolific year, 1952). Baird's beaked whales are not protected under the International Whaling Commission's moratorium on commercial whaling, as Japan argues they are a 'small cetacean' species, despite being larger than minke whales, which are protected. Each year, 62 Baird's beaked whales are hunted commercially in Japan, with the meat sold for human consumption. A landing and processing of a Baird's beaked whale was filmed by the Environmental Investigation Agency on 7 August 2009. Meat and blubber food products of the whales have been found to contain high levels of mercury and other pollutants, such as polychlorinated biphenyls (PCBs).

=== Population status ===
Estimates of the abundance of populations are unavailable. They are not listed as "threatened" or "endangered" under the endangered species act nor depleted under the MMPA.

=== Threats ===
The Baird's beaked whale is hunted by Japan. As of 2019, Japan pulled out of the International Whaling Commission (IWC) to continue harvesting whales commercially. The California large mesh drift gillnet fishery has known to interact with the CA-OR-WA population. There are habitat concerns for the Alaska stock, in areas with oil and gas activities or shipping and military activities are high. For the Baird's beaked whale. Anthropogenic sound sources such as military sonar and seismic testing. The testing of military sonar has been recorded to effect the diving behavior of beaked whales. This implication on the whales effects their ability to decompress upon surfacing and results in the whales suffering the bends, increase nitrogen gas bubbles in the blood.

== Common names ==
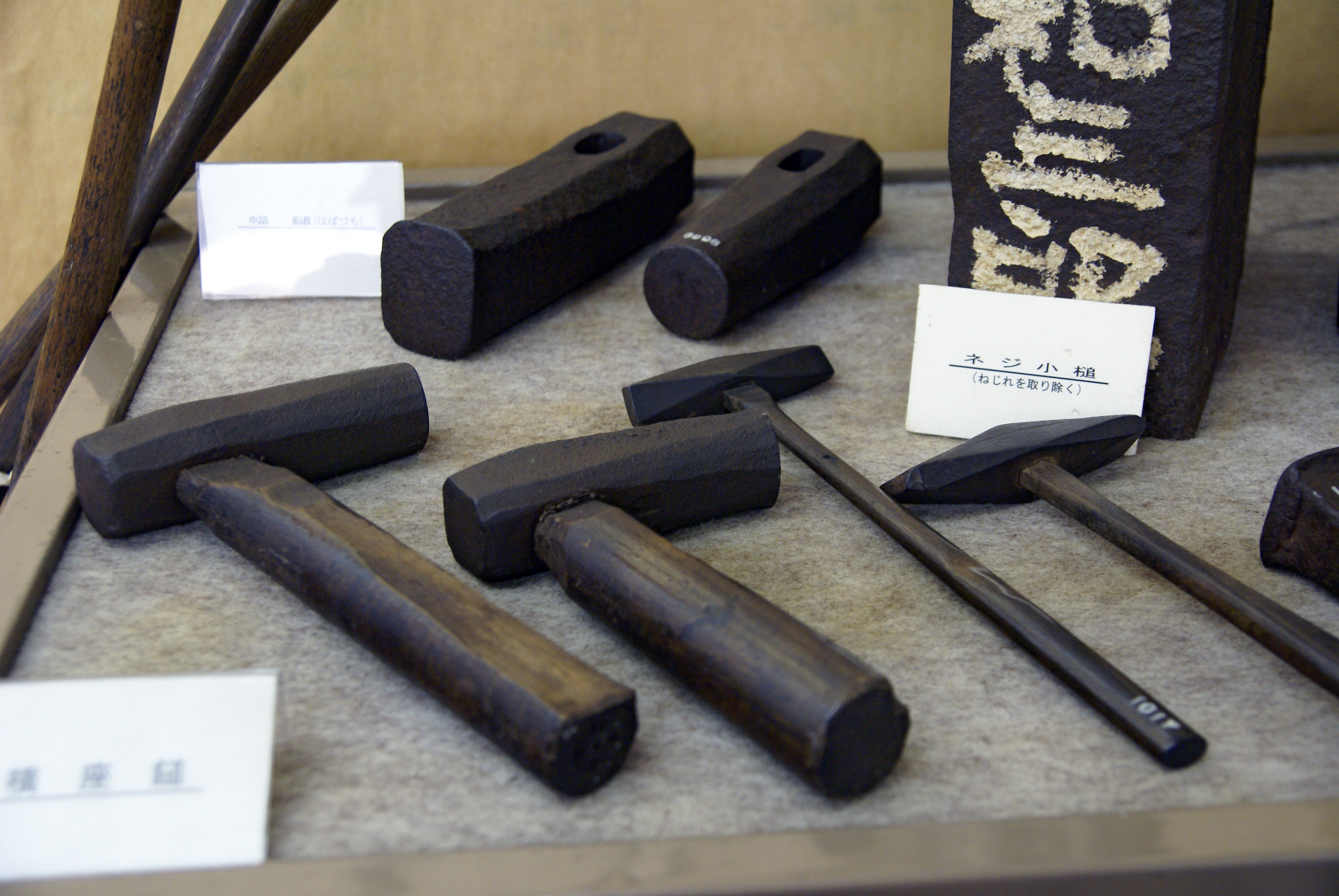
Some traditional Japanese hammers

- B. arnuxii is known as Arnoux's beaked whale, southern four-toothed whale, southern beaked whale, New Zealand beaked whale, southern giant bottlenose whale, and southern porpoise whale. In Japanese it is known as minami-tsuchi (ミナミツチ), literally "Southern hammer (i.e. Berardius)".
- B. bairdii is known as Baird's beaked whale, northern giant bottlenose whale, North Pacific bottlenose whale, giant four-toothed whale, northern four-toothed whale, and North Pacific four-toothed whale. In Japanese, it is called tsuchi-kujira (ツチクジラ), where tsuchi means "hammer", in reference to the way the head vaguely resembles a traditional Japanese hammer or mallet, and kujira means "whale".
- The newly described species, B. minimus, is traditionally known to Japanese whalers as kuro-tsuchi (黒ツチ), where kuro means "black" and tsuchi means "hammer". The Society for Marine Mammalogy lists Sato's beaked whale as an additional common name for B. minimus.

== See also ==
- List of cetaceans
