= Transverse Island =

Island in Antarctica

Transverse Island (67°20′S 59°19′E) is an island between Fold Island and Keel Island on the east side of Stefansson Bay, off the coast of Enderby Land. Mapped by Norwegian cartographers from air photos taken by the Lars Christensen Expedition, 1936–37, and named Tverrholmen (the transverse islet). Seen by an ANARE (Australian National Antarctic Research Expeditions) party in 1956. The translated form of the name recommended by Antarctic Names Committee of Australia (ANCA) has been approved.

== See also ==
- List of Antarctic and sub-Antarctic islands
