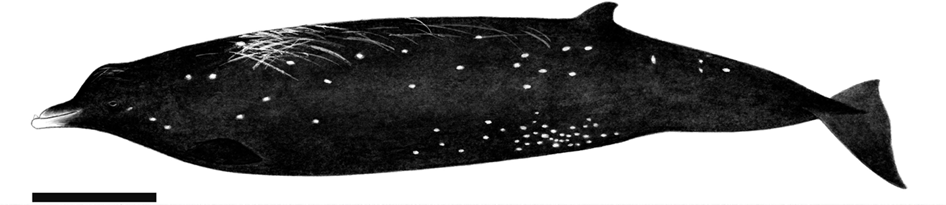
- Illustration of Berardius minimus (black scale bar is 1 metre [3.3 ft])
- Size compared to an average human

Conservation status
- Near Threatened (IUCN 3.1)
- CITES Appendix I

Scientific classification
- Kingdom: Animalia
- Phylum: Chordata
- Class: Mammalia
- Order: Artiodactyla
- Infraorder: Cetacea
- Family: Ziphiidae
- Genus: Berardius
- Species: B. minimus

Binomial name
- Berardius minimus Yamada, Kitamura & Matsuishi, 2019

= Sato's beaked whale =

Sato's beaked whale Temporal range: Middle Miocene to present, 11.5–0 Ma

Species of beaked whale

Sato's beaked whale (Berardius minimus; Japanese: Kurotsuchi-kujira) is a little-known species of four-toothed whale, a type of beaked whale.

== Description ==
Sato's beaked whale is one of the poorly distinguished species in the genus Berardius. It was distinguished from Arnoux's and Baird's beaked whale in 2019 on the basis of mtDNA differences. It generally has a short beak (~4% body length). While other four-toothed whales are generally grey with long linear scars, kurotsuchi-kujira usually have few linear scars, so that the dark, smooth skin contrasts highly with round, white scars of about 5 cm diameter, most likely from cookiecutter shark bites. The common name for Berardius minimus is in recognition of Hal Sato, a Hokkaido-based researcher whose photographs of the whales helped to distinguish this species from other beaked whales (note the image credit in Figure 1 and Figure 2 from the Yamada et al. paper).

== Distribution ==
The species' distribution, based on genetic samples from strandings only, is believed to include the southern Sea of Okhotsk north of Hokkaido, the Commander Islands, and the southeastern Bering Sea.

== Diet ==
Sato's beaked whale is an elusive deep diving whale. Despite this, there is a basic understanding of their behavior and diet. Similar to the other deep diving beaked whales of the genus Berardius, Sato's beaked whale feeds primarily on deep dwelling fish and squid living in the benthic or mesopelagic zones. Like Baird's and Arnoux's beaked whales, this species is thought to feed through suction feeding, resulting in a significant reduction in the number of functional teeth.

== Reproduction ==
This species of beaked whale travels in small, mixed groups with both females and males traveling together in pods. Unlike other species of beaked whales, both male and female Sato's beaked whales have been seen with scarring. This scarring is believed to stem from teeth raking caused by competition and males' access to females.

== Conservation ==
Although very little is known about the ecology and populations of Sato's beaked whale, the IUCN has assigned the species a classification of Near threatened based on its estimated low population numbers.
