= John J. C. Irving =

British Royal Navy officer

John James Cawdell Irving
- Born: John James Cawdell Irving; 22 January 1898; Oxford, England
- Died: 23 July 1967 (aged 69)
- Allegiance: United Kingdom
- Branch: Royal Navy
- Service years: 1914–1922; 1939–1945
- Rank: Commander
- Commands: RRS William Scoresby
- Conflicts: World War I, World War II
- Awards: Fellow of the Royal Geographical Society
- Spouse: Beryl Irving (née Newington)
- Children: 4, including David Irving
- Other work: Polar explorer, writer

John James Cawdell Irving (22 January 1898 – 23 July 1967) was a British Royal Navy officer, polar explorer, and writer. He served in the Royal Navy during World War I and later commanded an Antarctic research expedition. After his naval service, he became a writer of both fiction and non-fiction works on maritime subjects.

== Early life and education ==
Irving was born in Oxford, England, on 22 January 1898, to John Irving and Clara (née Cawdell) Irving. During World War I, he entered the Royal Navy as a cadet and was commissioned as a sub-lieutenant by 1918. He continued his service after the war and rose to the rank of lieutenant commander before retiring from the Royal Navy in 1922.

== Naval and exploring career ==
From 1930 to 1932, Irving was the executive commander of the research vessel RRS William Scoresby as part of the Discovery Investigations. He led an oceanographic and whale-marking expedition in the Antarctic, operating around South Georgia and in the Weddell Sea.

Irving was recalled to service during World War II, serving in training and staff roles. In 1944, he authored Naval Life and Customs, a book documenting the traditions and language of the Royal Navy. He retired after the war with the honorary rank of Commander.

== Writing career ==
After 1922, Irving began a career as a writer. In the late 1920s, he authored a trilogy of adventure novels, beginning with Dick Valliant: Naval Cadet (1928).

His non-fiction work included Coronel and the Falklands (1927), an account of two naval battles in World War I, and The King’s Britannia: The Story of a Great Ship (1937). In 1938, he co-authored The Yachtsman’s Week-End Book. In 1946, he published Royal Navalese: A Glossary of Fo’c’sle Language, a dictionary of Royal Navy terminology illustrated by his wife, Beryl Irving. His final book was The Smoke Screen of Jutland (1966), an analysis of the 1916 naval battle.

== Personal life ==
Irving was a Fellow of the Royal Geographical Society. He was married to Beryl (née Newington), and they had four children, including the author, David Irving.
