= Kurotsuchi =

Kurotsuchi may refer to:

- Berardius minimus, a smaller, darker beaked whale species, found in the northwest Pacific Ocean
- Mayuri Kurotsuchi, a character who is Captain of the 12th Division and President of the Shinigami Research Institute in the Japanese Bleach series.
- Nemu Kurotsuchi, a character who is artificially created daughter of the Captain in the Japanese Bleach series.
- Kurotsuchi, a character who is the granddaughter of the Third Tsuchikage, Onoki in the Japanese Naruto series.
