= Dales Island =

Island in Antarctica

- Location within Antarctica

Geography
- Location: Antarctica
- Coordinates: 67°11′S 59°44′E

Administration
- Administered under the Antarctic Treaty System

Demographics
- Population: Uninhabited

Dales Island is a small island lying 2 kilometres (1 nmi) north of the Warnock Islands, to the north of the William Scoresby Archipelago. It was discovered and named by Discovery Investigations personnel on the William Scoresby in February 1936.

== See also ==
- List of Antarctic and sub-Antarctic islands
