= Warnock Islands =

Group of islands in Antarctica

Warnock Islands (67°12′S 59°44′E) is a group of small offshore islands lying 1 nautical mile (1.9 km) south and southwest of Dales Island at the north end of William Scoresby Archipelago. Discovered and named in February 1936 by DI personnel on the William Scoresby.

The Islands were named after John Fleming Warnock, who was Engineer Lieutenant on the RRS William Scoresby.

== See also ==
- List of Antarctic and sub-Antarctic islands
