= McCarthy Island (Kemp Land) =

Island in Antarctica

- Location within Antarctica

Geography
- Location: Antarctica
- Coordinates: 67°16′S 59°25′E
- Length: 4 km (2.5 mi)

Administration
- Administered under the Antarctic Treaty System

Demographics
- Population: Uninhabited

McCarthy Island is an island 4 kilometres (2 nmi) long, lying just northeast of Fold Island, off the coast of Kemp Land, Antarctica. It was mapped as part of Fold Island (Foldoya) by Norwegian cartographers from air photos taken by the Lars Christensen Expedition, 1936–37, but was identified as a separate island by an Australian National Antarctic Research Expeditions (ANARE) geological party in 1961. The island was named by the Antarctic Names Committee of Australia for W.R. McCarthy, an Australian petrologist who described several hundred specimens from Antarctica collected by ANARE geologists.

== See also ==
- List of Antarctic and sub-Antarctic islands
