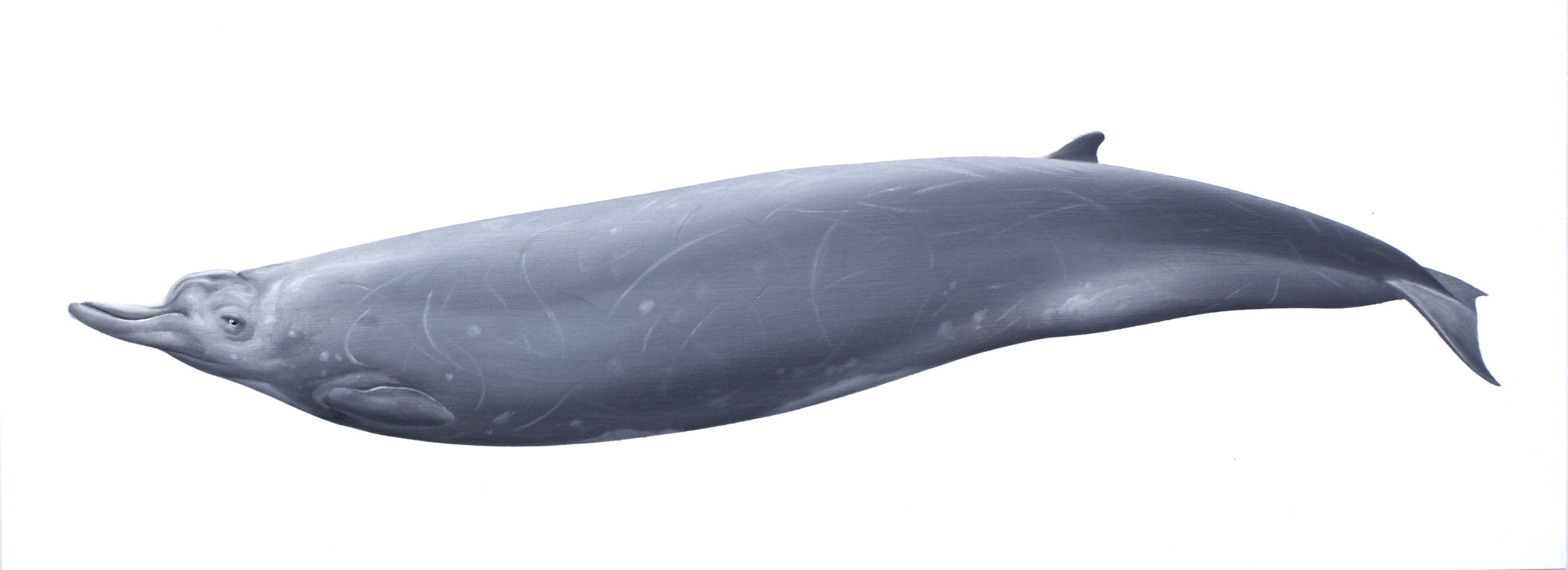
- Arnoux's beaked whale (Berardius arnuxii)
- Size compared to an average human

Conservation status
- Least Concern (IUCN 3.1)
- CITES Appendix I

Scientific classification
- Kingdom: Animalia
- Phylum: Chordata
- Class: Mammalia
- Order: Artiodactyla
- Infraorder: Cetacea
- Family: Ziphiidae
- Genus: Berardius
- Species: B. arnuxii

Binomial name
- Berardius arnuxii Duvernoy, 1851
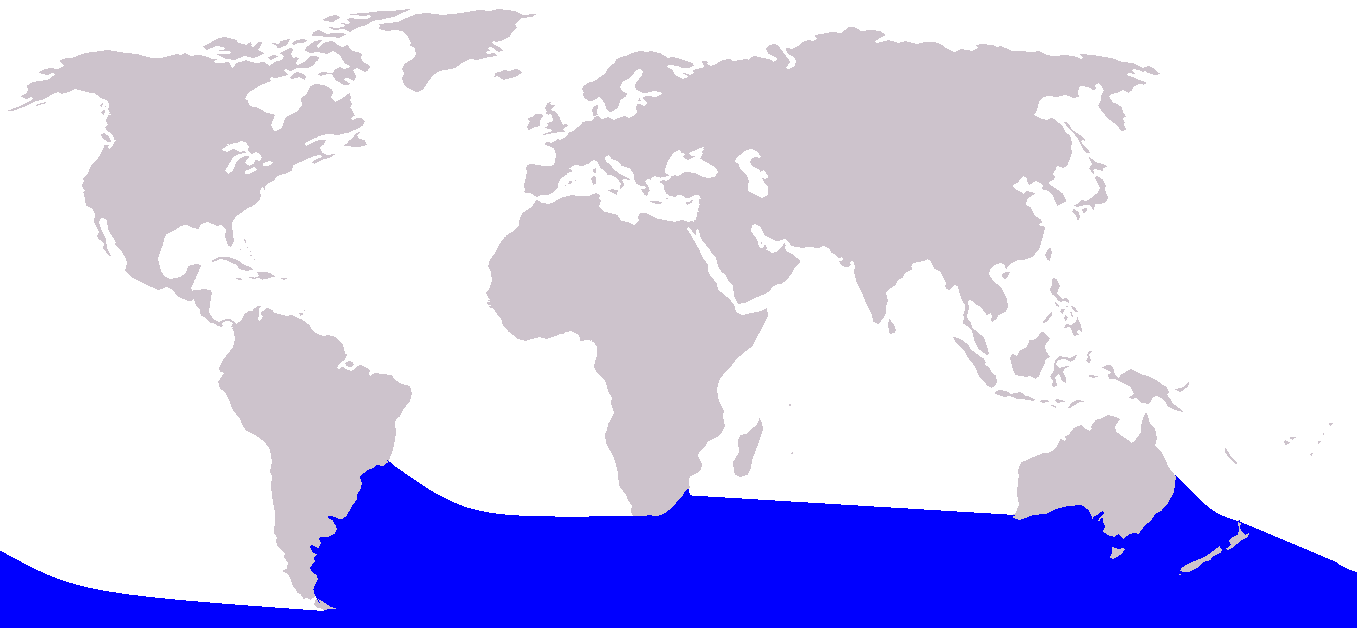
- Arnoux's beaked whale range

= Arnoux's beaked whale =

Arnoux's beaked whale Temporal range: Middle Miocene to present, 11.5–0 Ma

Species of whale

Arnoux's beaked whale (Berardius arnuxii), also called the southern four-toothed whale, southern beaked whale, New Zealand beaked whale, southern giant bottlenose whale and southern porpoise whale is one of the species of Berardius. Arnoux's and Baird's beaked whales are so similar that researchers debated whether or not they are simply two populations of the same species, until genetic evidence and their wide geographical separation led them to be classified as separate. Little is known about their behavior due to infrequent encounters with live individuals.

== Etymology ==
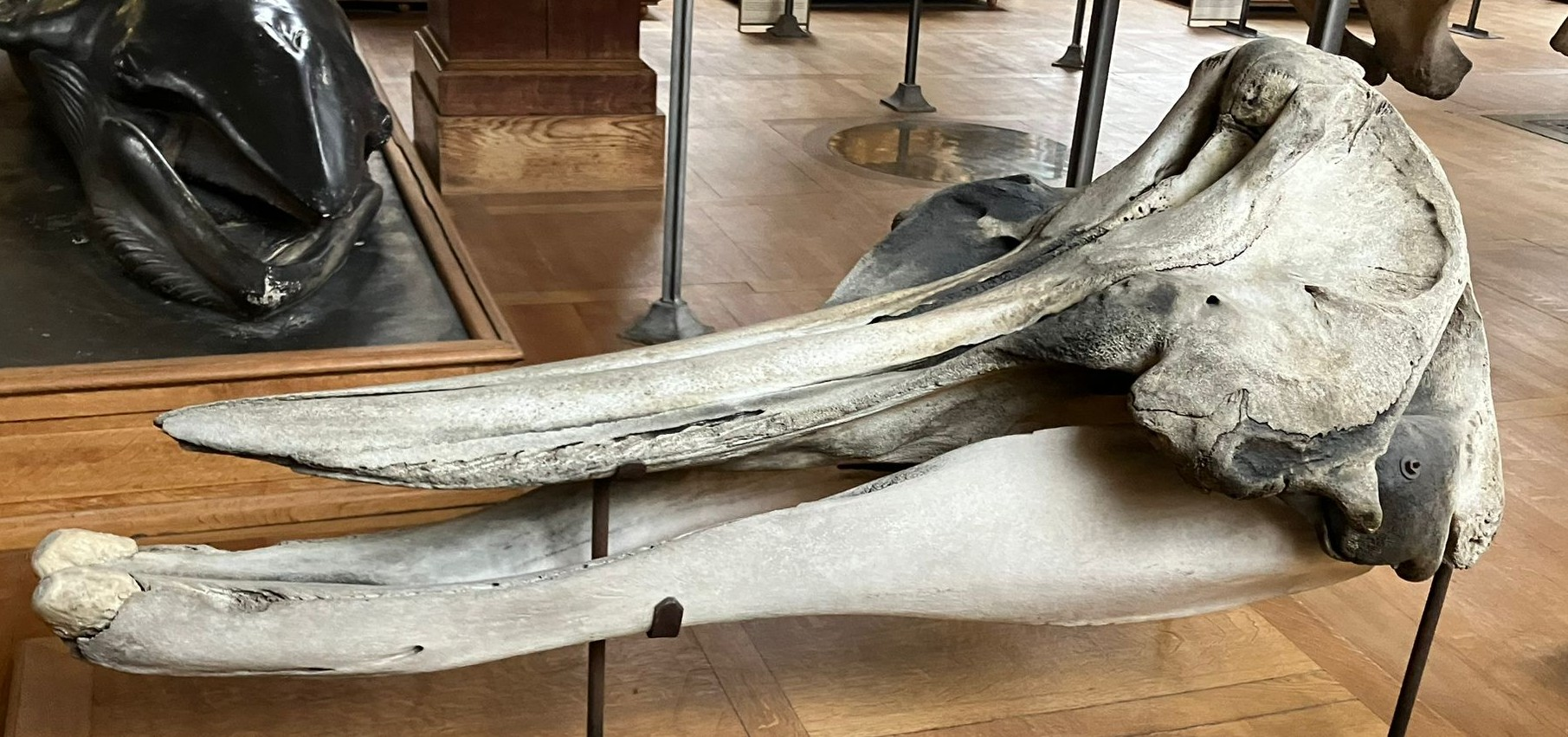
The skull of Berardius arnuxii presented to the Paris Museum of Naturel History in 1846

Named Berardius arnuxii in 1851 for the French surgeon, M. Arnoux, who presented the skull to the Paris Museum of Natural History in 1846.

== Description ==
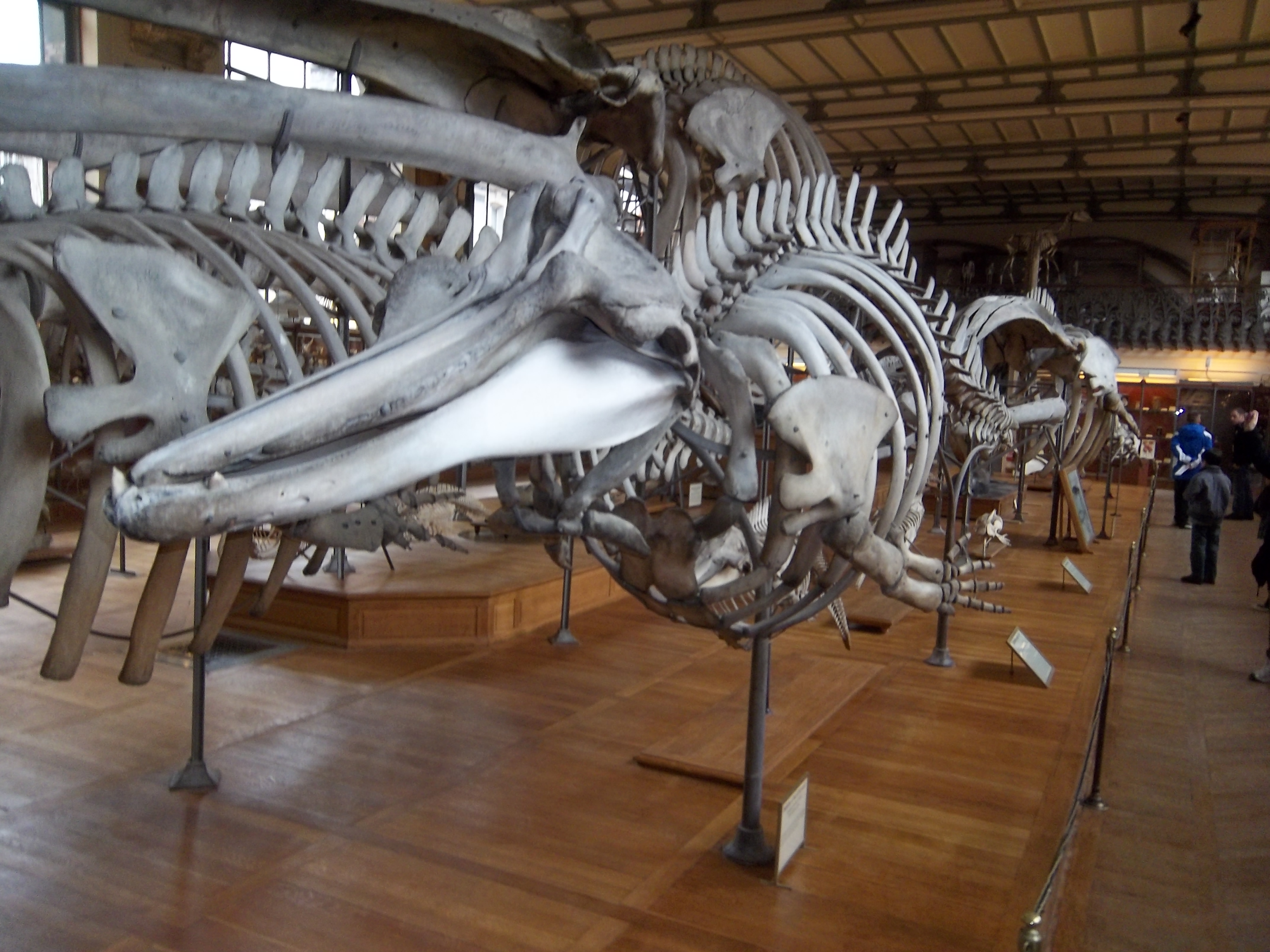
Skeleton of Berardius arnuxii, showing a skull adapted to vocalizations

Arnoux's and Baird's beaked whales, have very similar features and would be indistinguishable at sea if they did not exist in disjoint locations. Both whales reach similar sizes, have bulbous melons, and long prominent beaks. Their lower jaw is longer than the upper, and once sexual maturity is reached the front teeth are visible even when the mouth is fully closed. The Baird's and Arnoux's beaked whales are the only whales in the Ziphiidae family where both sexes have erupted teeth. The teeth in the Ziphiidae are presumed to be used by males for fighting and competition for females. Ziphiidae have the most prevalent and pronounced markings caused by teeth scarring among the cetaceans. Front-facing teeth may be covered in barnacles after many years.

Baird's and Arnoux's beaked whales have similarly shaped small flippers with rounded tips, and small dorsal fins that sit far back on their bodies. These traits are similar in both sexes, as there is little sexual dimorphism in either species. Among the observed differences in the sexes is their size: female Baird's and Arnoux giant beaked whales are slightly larger than the males.This species has a thick, lipid-rich blubber layer to provide thermal insulation in its frigid habitat.

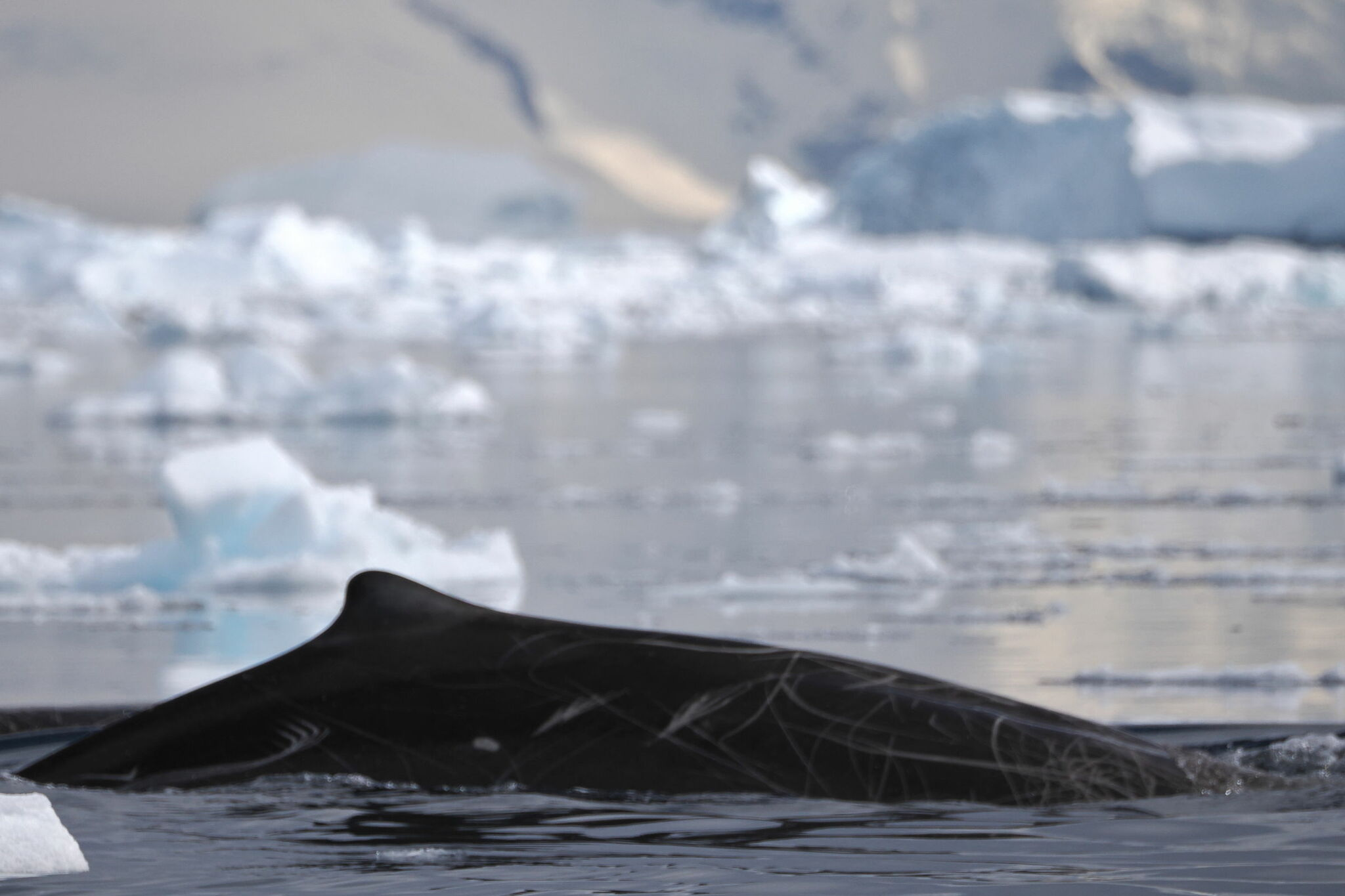
An adult Arnoux's beaked whale shortly after surfacing. The numerous irregular, pale tooth-rake scars are caused by intraspecific aggression and other social interactions, accumulating progressively with age.

== Behavior ==
=== Food and foraging ===
Arnoux's beaked whales are deep-diving, echolocating suction-feeders. Like other beaked whales, this species possess a pair of V-shaped throat grooves that are thought to facilitate suction feeding by creating negative pressure within the mouth as the tongue retracts and the throat grooves expand, powerfully drawing prey inward like a biological vacuum.

Prey taxa include Batoteuthis skolops, Moroteuthopsis longimana, Galiteuthis glacialis and Taonius sp. and some fish.

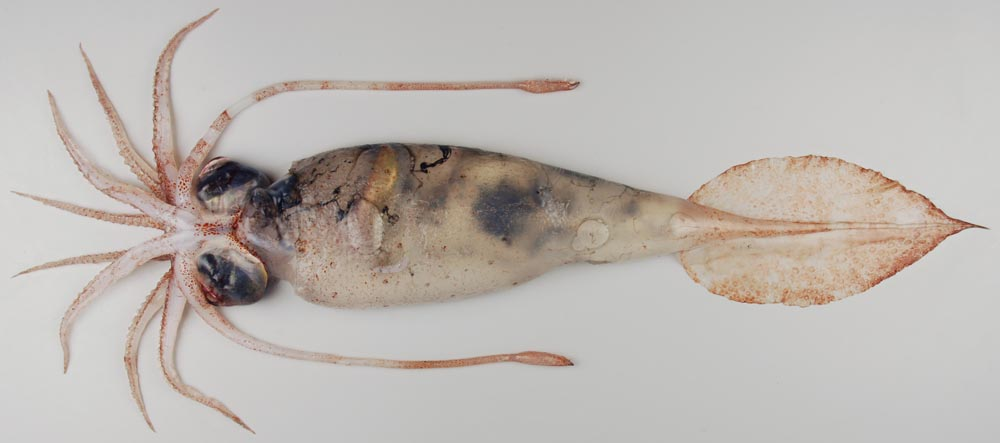
Southern Ocean squid like this Galiteuthis glacialis are important prey items for this whale.

=== Diving behavior ===
This species has been recorded taking dives of 15–25 minutes to an hour. They tend to spend 5-15 at the surface between dives. They routinely dive greater than 500 m, and possibly as deep as 3000 m.

=== Social behavior ===
Arnoux's beaked whales are very social animals. Large groups of animals, pods of up to 47 individuals, have been observed off Kemp Land, Antarctica. Even larger congregations of 80 have been recorded, though they eventually split off into smaller pods. Pods are made up of adult males, females and calves. Adult males and females pick up numerous white linear scars caused by the usage of apical teeth in social interactions (such as fights) all over the body as they age, and these may be a rough indicator of age. These whales are known to breach fairly frequently, as well as other aerial behaviors such as spyhopping, lobtail and flipper slap. They are also noted to be inquisitive, often approaching boats and humans.

Like Baird's beaked whale, they are thought to sexually mature around ~10 years of age and physically mature around ~20 years. They may live up to 80 years.

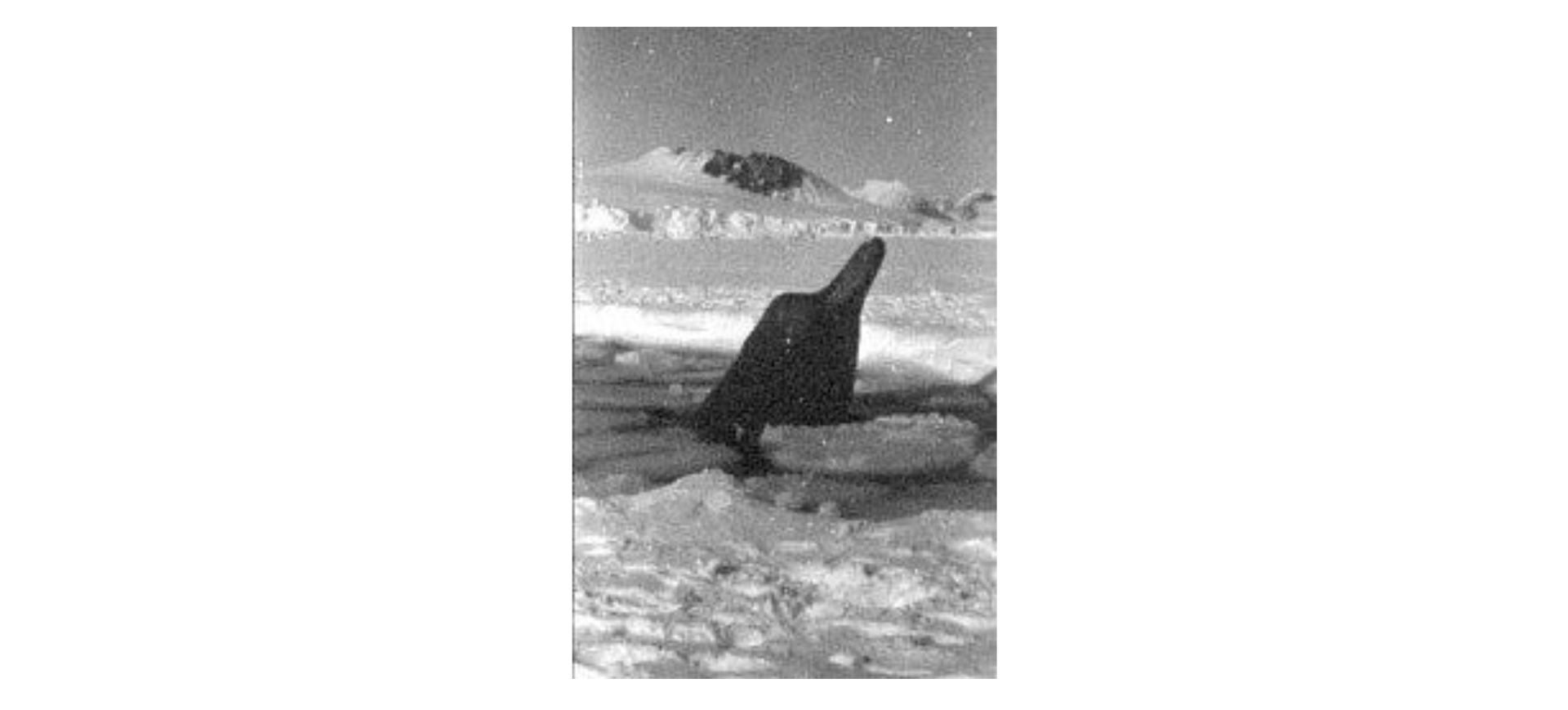
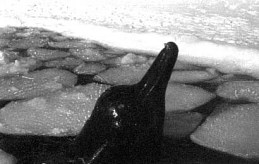

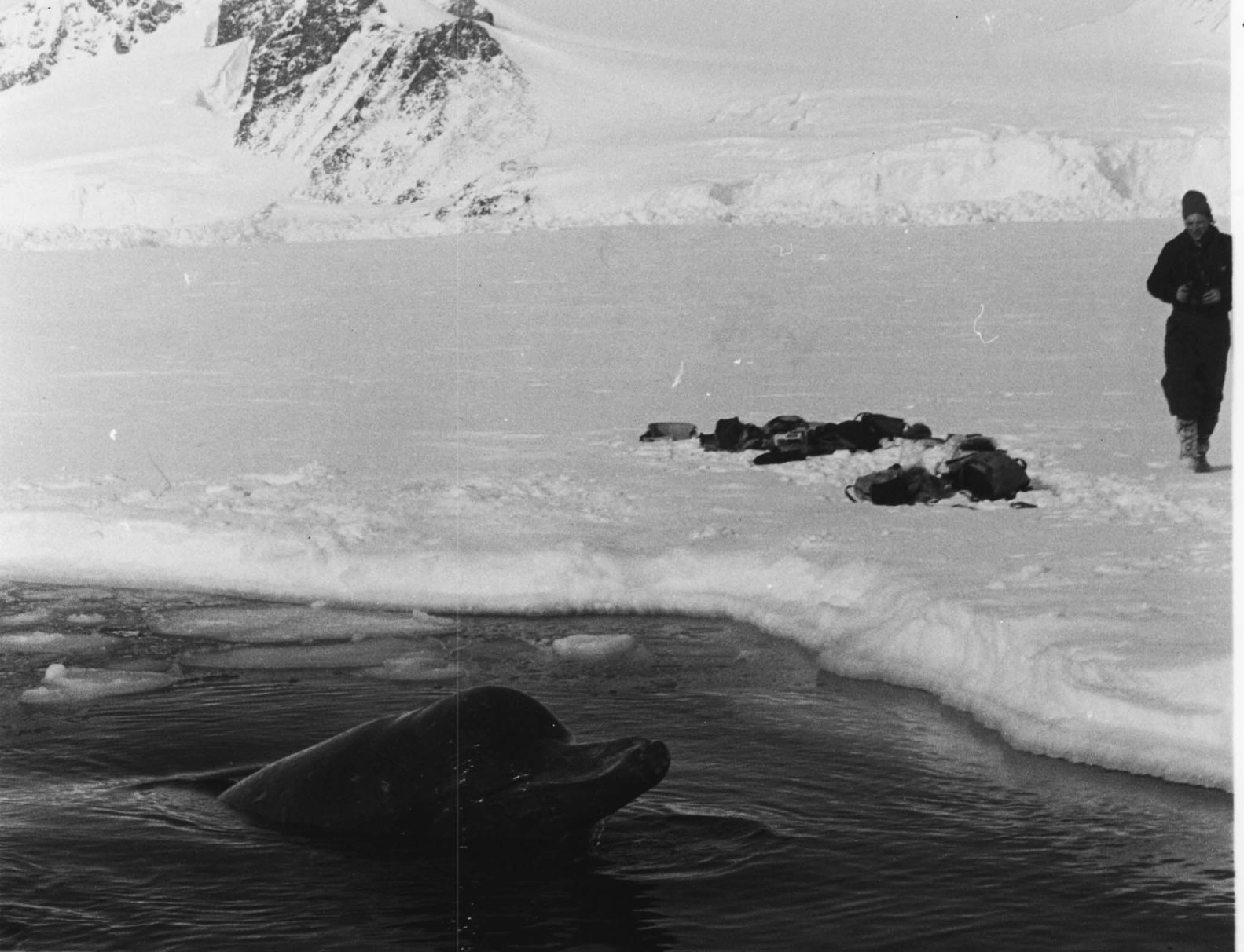
Investigating a researcher.

Adult Arnoux's beaked whale spyhopping in Antarctica (1992)

=== Predators ===
Killer whales are the only animal that could be a potential predator. Some scarring from attacks is evidently caused by them, notably on their flukes, dorsal and pectoral fins. White, circular or oval-shaped wounds are often present and are caused by cookiecutter sharks taking chunks of tissue from their bodies.

== Population and distribution ==
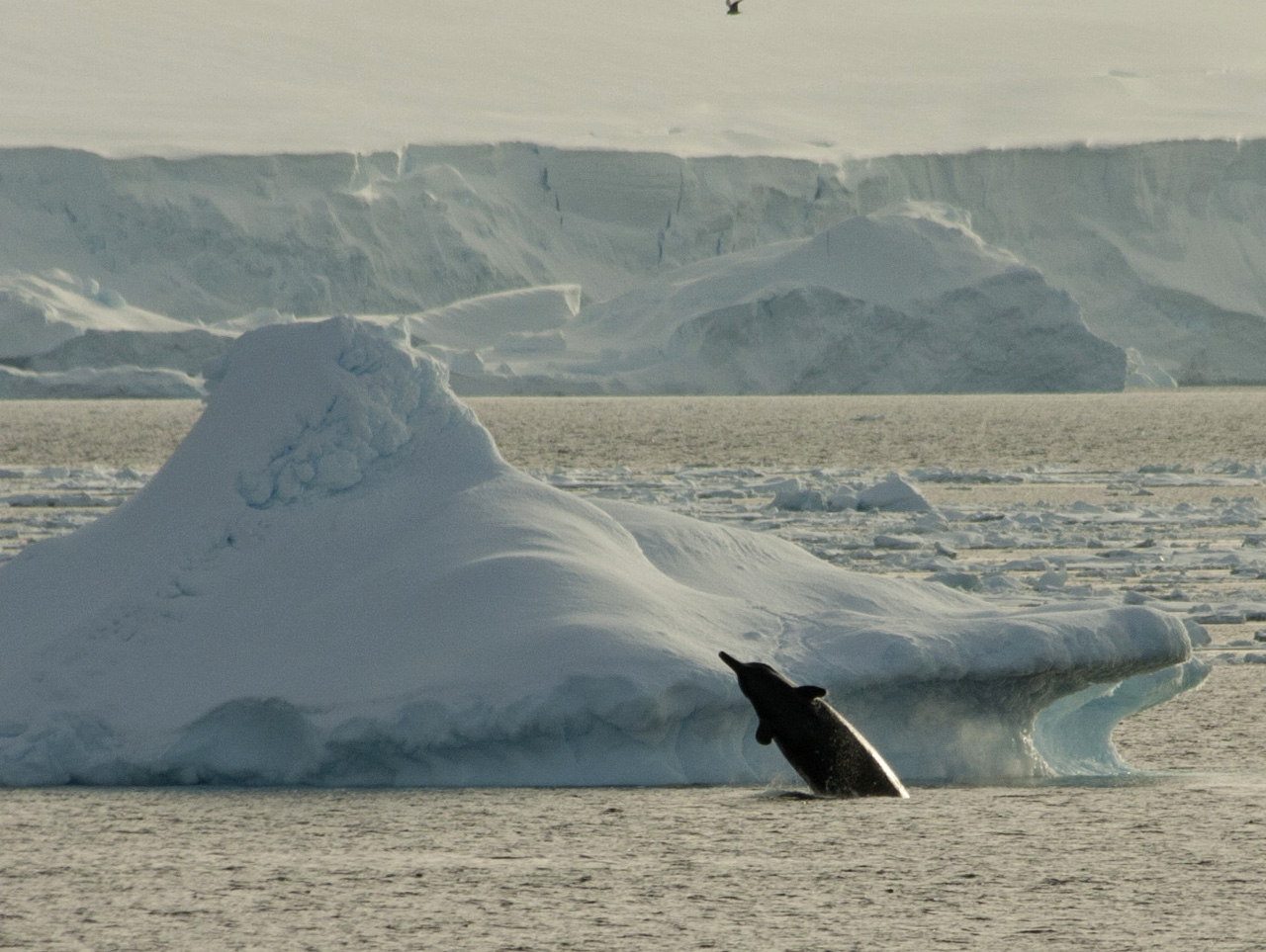
Arnoux's beaked whale breaching in Antarctica.

Arnoux's beaked whales inhabit great tracts of the Southern Ocean. Beachings in New Zealand and Argentina indicate the whale may be relatively common in the Southern Ocean between those countries and Antarctica; sporadic sightings have been recorded in polar waters, such as in McMurdo Sound. It has also been spotted close to South Georgia and South Africa, indicating a likely circumpolar distribution. The northernmost stranding was at 34 degrees south, indicating the whales inhabit cool and temperate, as well as polar, waters. There is no stock report for the Arnoux's beaked whale to date by NOAA.

An April 2022 sighting in the Weddell Sea prompted a review of 108 prior sightings of 1125 individuals, dating to 1986-1998. This review corroborated their presumed range in the Southern Ocean, and found that Arnoux's beaked whales prefer the coasts of icy landmasses. In temperate regions above 60 degrees South, they can also be found near continents, even in fjords far inland.

== Conservation ==
Arnoux's beaked whale has rarely been exploited, and although no abundance estimates are available, the population is not believed to be endangered. Arnoux's beaked whale is covered by the Memorandum of Understanding for the Conservation of Cetaceans and Their Habitats in the Pacific Islands Region (Pacific Cetaceans MOU).
