= Tillett Islands =

Islands

Tillett Booby Islands (67°11′S 59°27′E) is a group of small, somewhat dispersed islands, the largest rising 70 m above the sea, lying 5 nautical miles (9 km) northeast of Cape Wilkins. Discovered and named in February 1936 by DI personnel on the William Scoresby.

== See also ==
- List of Antarctic and sub-Antarctic islands
