= Fold Island =

Offshore island north of Ives Tongue

- Location within Antarctica

Geography
- Location: Antarctica
- Coordinates: 67°17′S 59°23′E

Administration
- Administered under the Antarctic Treaty System

Demographics
- Population: Uninhabited

Fold Island, also known as Foldøya, is an offshore island north of Ives Tongue, 11 kilometres (6 nmi) long and 6 kilometres (3 nmi) wide, which, with smaller islands south, separate Stefansson Bay to the west from William Scoresby Bay to the east. This feature was seen by Discovery Investigations (DI) personnel on the RSS William Scoresby in February 1936, who mapped it as part of the mainland. It was determined to be an island and named Foldøya by Norwegian cartographers who charted this area from aerial photographs taken by the Lars Christensen Expedition (LCE) in January–February 1937.

Cape Wilkins is a rocky cape at the north tip of Fold Island, forming the east side of the entrance to Stefansson Bay. Discovered on February 18, 1931, by the British Australian New Zealand Antarctic Research Expedition (BANZARE) under Douglas Mawson. Mawson named this feature Cape Hearst in gratitude for the purchase of the news rights of BANZARE by the Hearst Press. It was mapped again in February 1936 by DI personnel, then remapped in greater detail from LCE air photos. Mawson later agreed to change the name to Cape Wilkins, the name used by subsequent expeditions. Green Point is a rocky point forming the eastern extremity of Fold Island, at the west side of the entrance to William Scoresby Bay, Antarctica. It was discovered and named by DI personnel.

Mount Whiteside is a low, conical peak, 190 m (620 ft) high, surmounting the east extremity of Fold Island.

Nearby islands include Keel Island, McCarthy Island, the Tillett Islands, and Transverse Island.
