= William Scoresby Archipelago =

Island group in Antarctica

Coordinates: 67°20′S 59°45′E

William Scoresby Archipelago is a group of islands which extends northward from the coast just east of William Scoresby Bay, Antarctica. The more important islands in the group are Bertha, Islay, Couling, and the Sheehan Islands. Most of the islands and features in this archipelago were discovered in February 1936 by Discovery Investigations (DI) personnel on the RSS William Scoresby. They named the group after their ship.

== Islands and features ==
The northernmost island of any note is Farrington Island. 3 kilometres (1.5 nmi) east is a group of small islands called the Klakkane Islands. The Klakkanes were charted and named klakkane (the lumps) by Norwegian cartographers from aerial photographs taken by the Lars Christensen Expedition (LCE) in January 1937. 7 kilometres (4 nmi) south-southeast of Farrington is Couling Island, which is 1.9 kilometres (1 nmi) long. The next significant island is Islay, which is 3.7 kilometres (2 nmi) long and sits 2 kilometres (1 nmi) south of Couling and 2.8 kilometres (1.5 nmi) north of Bertha Island. DI personnel probably named it after Islay, an island in the Hebrides archipelago in Scotland. McDonald Point marks the western end of Islay.

At the southeast side of Islay is a small group called the Sheehan Islands. These were first discovered on February 18, 1931, by the British Australian New Zealand Antarctic Research Expedition (BANZARE) under Douglas Mawson. Believing the islands were a set of inland nunataks, he named one of the group Sheehan Nunatak after Sir Harry Sheehan, and BANZARE erroneously charted Sheehan Nunatak as lying behind the coastline. On February 27, 1936, DI personnel discovered the features were actually islands. The islands were more fully mapped by Norwegian cartographers from aerial photographs taken by the LCE in January and February 1937.

Macfie Sound separates Islay from Bertha Island. The sound extends in an east–west direction, and is 1 nautical mile (2 km) wide at its narrowest point. It was named for Lieutenant A.F. Macfie, a chart-maker for DI. Hum Island is a small island in the sound between Islay and Bertha. Bertha Island is 4.6 kilometres (2.5 nmi) long, and lies 1.9 kilometres (1 nmi) south of Islay at the east side of William Scoresby Bay. Warren Island is a small island in William Scoresby Bay, close south of the west end of Bertha Island. Point Appleby marks the western coast of an unnamed island .8 nmi (1.5 km; 0.92 mi) south of Warren. It was charted and named by DI personnel as a point on the eastern shore of the bay, but air photos from the LCE indicated that it was actually a point on a small island near the bay shore.

== Nearby islands ==
The Warnock Islands are a separate group to the north of the William Scoresby Archipelago. Dales Island is farther north than them.
