= Tilley Bay =

Bay in Antarctica

Tilley Bay (67°24′S 60°4′E) is a bay just east of Tilley Nunatak on the coast of Mac. Robertson Land. Mapped by Norwegian cartographers from air photos taken by the Lars Christensen Expedition, 1936–37, and named Nabbvika (peg bay). Renamed by Antarctic Names Committee of Australia (ANCA) because of its proximity to Tilley Nunatak.
