= Keel Island =

Island in Antarctica

- Location within Antarctica

Geography
- Location: Antarctica
- Coordinates: 67°21′S 59°19′E

Administration
- Administered under the Antarctic Treaty System

Demographics
- Population: Uninhabited

Keel Island is an island lying 2 kilometres (1 nmi) south of Fold Island on the east side of Stefansson Bay, off the coast of Enderby Land, Antarctica. It was mapped by Norwegian cartographers from air photos taken by the Lars Christensen Expedition, 1936–37, and named Kjolen (the keel). It was seen by an Australian National Antarctic Research Expeditions party in 1956. The translated form of the name recommended by the Antarctic Names Committee of Australia has been approved.
