= Hobbs Islands =

Island group in Antarctica

- Location within Antarctica

Geography
- Location: Antarctica
- Coordinates: 67°19′S 59°58′E

Administration
- Administered under the Antarctic Treaty System

Demographics
- Population: Uninhabited

The Hobbs Islands are a group of islands 19 kilometres (10 nmi) northeast of William Scoresby Bay, Antarctica. The largest island of this group was discovered on 18 February 1931 by the British Australian New Zealand Antarctic Research Expedition under Mawson who thought it to be a cape and called it "Cape Hobbs" for Professor William H. Hobbs. Later exploration by the William Scoresby expedition (1936) and the Lars Christensen Expedition (1936–37) showed it to be part of an island group.

== See also ==
- List of Antarctic and sub-Antarctic islands
