= Uksen Island =

Island in Antarctica

Uksen Island (67°21′S 60°9′E) is a steep-sided, isolated island lying 6 km (4 mi) northeast of Tilley Nunatak, off the coast of Mac. Robertson Land. It was first mapped by Norwegian cartographers from air photos taken by the Lars Christensen Expedition, 1936–37, and named Uksen (the ox).

== See also ==
- List of Antarctic and sub-Antarctic islands
