= Kemp Coast =

Portion of the coast of Antarctica

Coordinates: 67°15′S 58°0′E

Location of Kemp Coast

Kemp Coast is that portion of the coast of Antarctica that lies between the head of Edward VIII Bay, at 56°25′E, and William Scoresby Bay, at 59°34′E. It is named for a British sealing captain, Peter Kemp, who discovered land in this vicinity in 1833.
