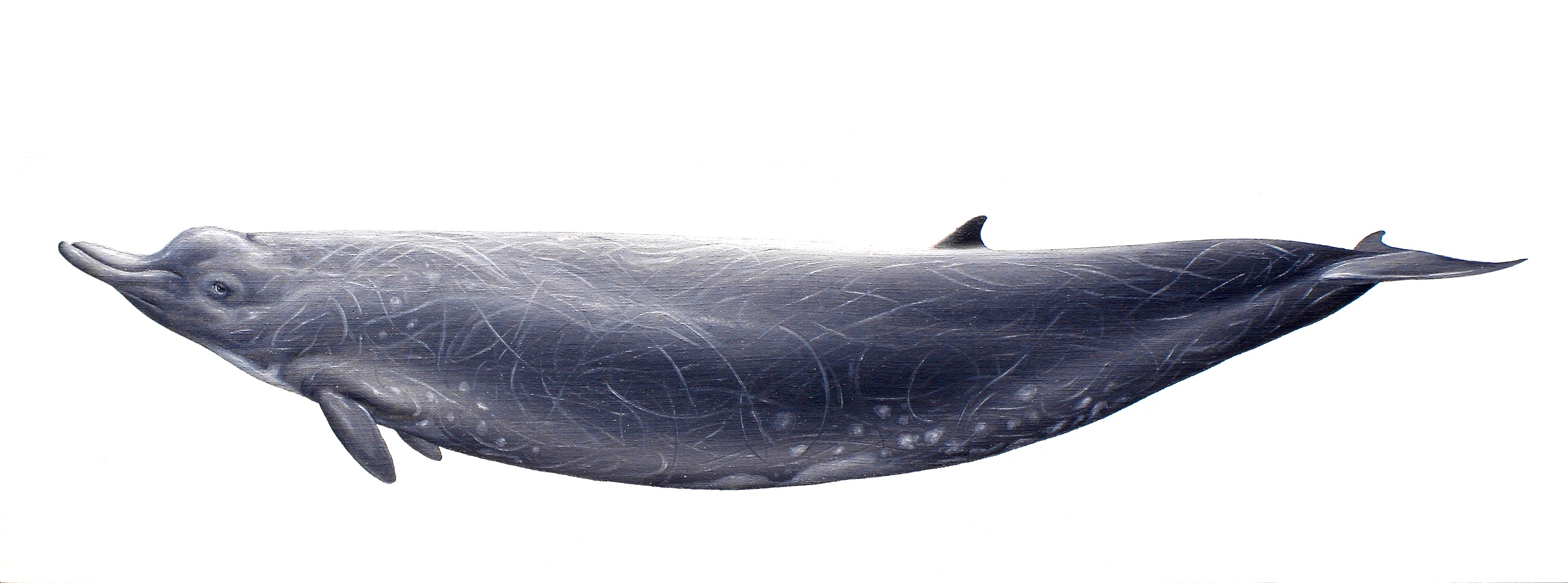

- Size compared to an average human

Conservation status
- Least Concern (IUCN 3.1)

- Apparently Secure (NatureServe)
- CITES Appendix I

Scientific classification
- Kingdom: Animalia
- Phylum: Chordata
- Class: Mammalia
- Order: Artiodactyla
- Infraorder: Cetacea
- Family: Ziphiidae
- Genus: Berardius
- Species: B. bairdii

Binomial name
- Berardius bairdii Stejneger, 1883
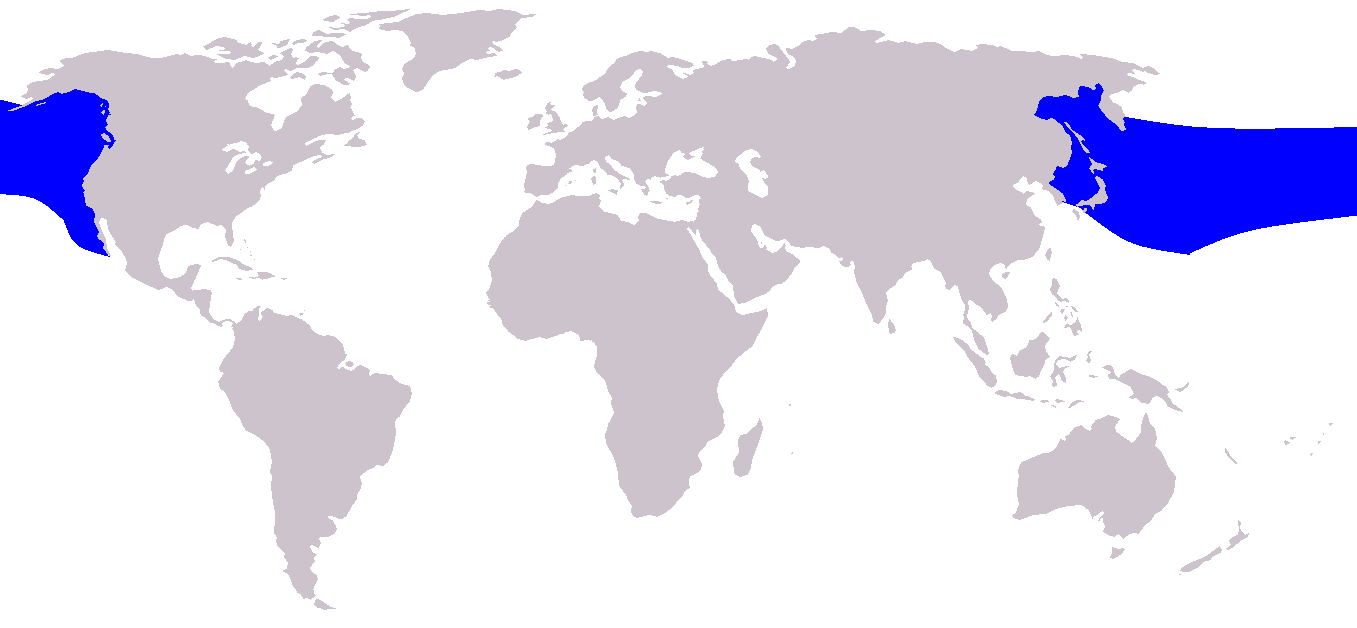
- Baird's beaked whale range

= Baird's beaked whale =

Baird's beaked whale Temporal range: Middle Miocene to present, 11.5–0 Ma

Species of mammals

Baird's beaked whale (Berardius bairdii), also known commonly as the northern giant bottlenose whale, North Pacific bottlenose whale, giant four-toothed whale, northern four-toothed whale and North Pacific four-toothed whale, is a species of whale in the genus Berardius of the family Ziphiidae. Baird's beaked whale and Arnoux's beaked whale are so similar that researchers have debated whether or not they are simply two populations of the same species. However, genetic evidence and their wide geographical separation has led them to be classified as separate. Baird's beaked whale is the largest beaked whale and the second largest living species of toothed whale after the sperm whale.

== Taxonomy ==
Baird's beaked whale was first described in 1883 by American zoologist Leonhard Stejneger based on a skull from a specimen that had been found stranded on the eastern shore of Bering Island the previous fall. The species was named after Spencer Fullerton Baird, the then Secretary of the Smithsonian. A few months after Stejneger's description was published, Swedish zoologist August Wilhelm Malm published a description of what he thought to be a new species in the genus Berardius, Berardius vegae, based on a portion of a skull found on Bering Island in 1879. Berardius vegae was later determined to be a junior synonym of Berardius bairdii.

== Description ==
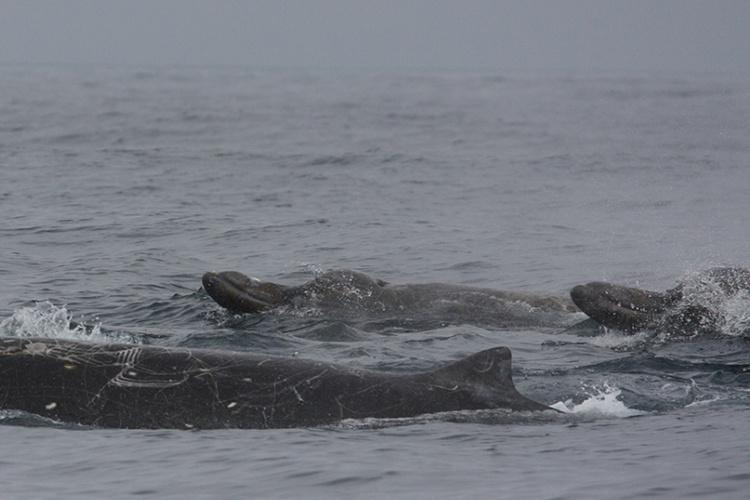
A pod of Baird's beaked whales surfacing.

The species Berardius bairdii reaches lengths of about 11.9 metres (39 ft) for males and 12.8 metres (42 ft) for females. The longest confirmed specimen was 13 m (43 ft) in length and the heaviest was 14 tonnes (15 short tons).

The snout, called a beak, is elongated and lacks all teeth except for one or two sets in the lower mandible, which are called "battle teeth" for their use in intra-species conflict. Individuals often bear scars from such confrontations.

The age of sexual maturity is thought to be 10–15 years for females and 6–11 years for males. Young Baird's beaked whales remain with their mothers until they are 6–9 years old. The testes continue to grow until the whales are 30–40 years old, and only these older males are likely to participate in reproduction. The oldest in a study of Baird's beaked whales were 54 years for females and 84 years for males, respectively.

== Ecology ==
=== Distribution ===
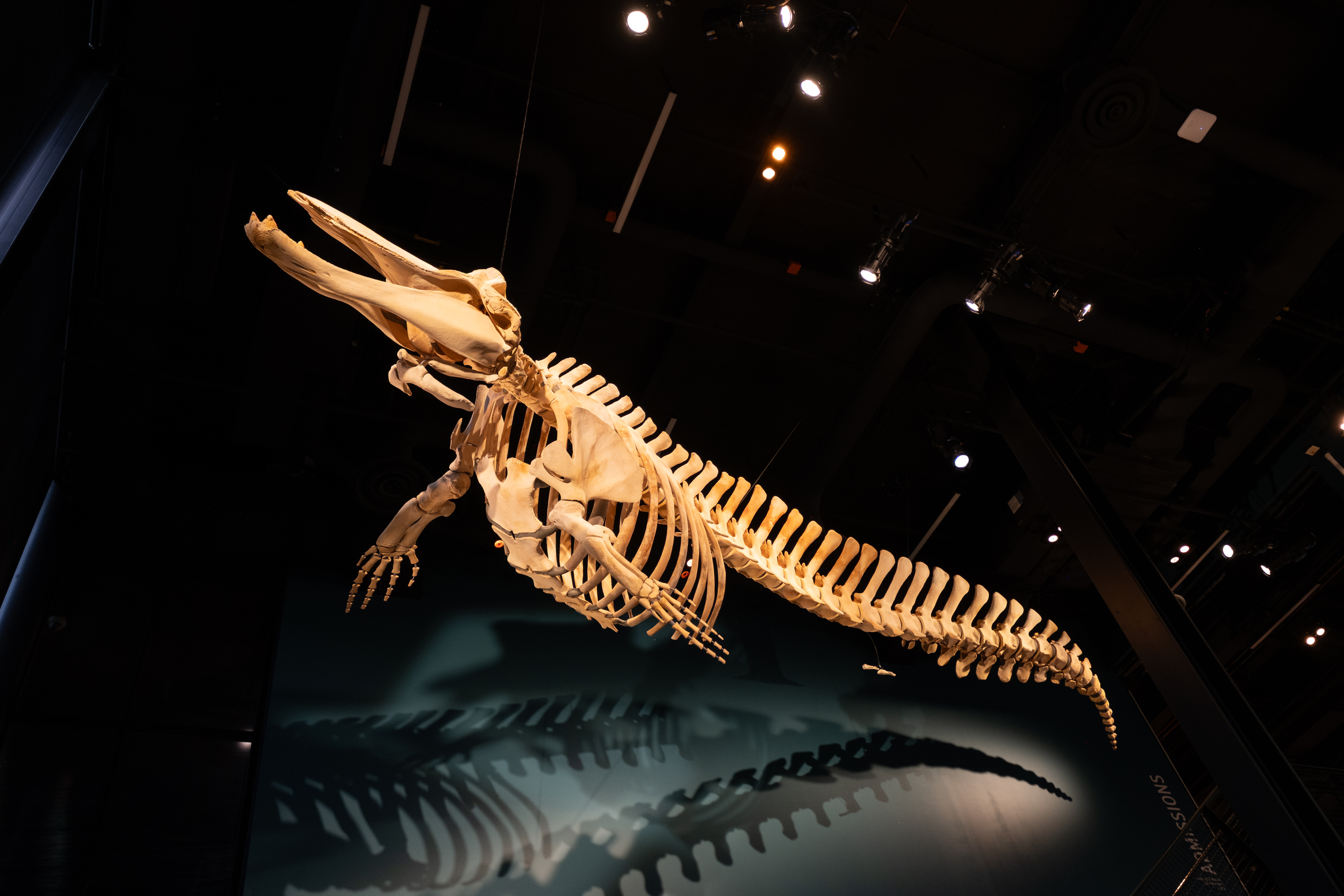
The Burke Museum of Natural History and Culture in Seattle displays the skeleton of a Baird's beaked whale. This specimen washed ashore on a Washington beach in 2015.

Berardius bairdii occurs primarily in the North Pacific Ocean, where it is a deep-water cetacean, often frequenting depths between 1,000 and 3,000 m (3,280 and 9,840 ft) in its search for prey.

In the northwestern part of its range, sightings have been documented off of Hokkaido, Japan, Sakhalin and Kamchatka, as well as in the Sea of Okhotsk, the Bering Sea and the Aleutian Islands. In the more eastern and southern reaches of their distribution, they have been seen from southern Alaska and down the U.S. West Coast to San Diego and northern Baja California.

=== Diet ===
Similar to other beaked whales, Baird's beaked whale feeds primarily on deep-water fishes and cephalopods. Analyses of stomach contents from individuals taken in Japanese waters have shown that the species consumes a wide range of deep-sea prey, including benthic fishes such as Moridae and grenadiers, as well as numerous species of squid.

Diet composition varies regionally. Populations off the Pacific coast of Honshu feed predominantly on deep-water fishes, while those in the southern Sea of Okhotsk consume mostly cephalopods, including members of the families Gonatidae and Cranchiidae. The longfin codling (Laemonema longipes) has been identified as an important prey species in both regions. These differences are thought to reflect variation in prey availability rather than strict dietary specialization.

Other recorded prey taxa include pollock, mackerel, sardines, Pacific saury, skates, scorpionfish, Coryphaenoides sp., Onychoteuthis sp. and Onykia sp.

== Behavior ==
Baird's beaked whales spend much of its time below the surface while foraging. Individuals undertake extended deep dives that are interspersed with a series of shorter dives at intermediate and shallow depths. Deep dives are associated with foraging and may extend to the seafloor in areas where suitable prey is available. In some cases, changes in depth during these phases suggest that individuals may follow seafloor topography while feeding.

Intermediate-depth dives are also common, and may involve foraging within mesopelagic layers where squid and other prey occur, although their precise function remains uncertain. Shallower dives occur more frequently and are thought to serve as recovery periods between deeper foraging dives.

Baird's beaked whales live in schools of up to 100 individuals that form a tight group at the surface, possibly as a defense mechanism against orcas. There is evidence of sex-based spatial separation in the ocean. While this pattern has been attributed to pregnant or lactating females avoiding potentially aggressive males, alternative explanations suggest it may reflect the species’ demographic structure, in which a high number of mature males (possibly including related individuals) could play a role in social organization or calf rearing.

In addition to deep-water foraging behavior, one study has observed some populations using unusually shallow habitats (under 300 meters). A group in the Commander Islands has been documented regularly occupying areas with depths far shallower than those typically associated with the species. This behavior appears to be socially transmitted, as individuals familiar with the area use these habitats more frequently, while newcomers adopt the behavior after associating with resident whales. Genetic analyses indicate that this pattern is not tied to maternal lineages, suggesting that knowledge of these habitats is transmitted horizontally through social learning. This could be evidence of a localized cultural tradition in Baird's beaked whales.

== Whaling ==
Historically, at least 4,000 Baird's beaked whales have been hunted, primarily by Japan, but also by Russia, Canada, and the United States. Commercial whalers in Japan still hunt Baird's beaked whales.
