= Stefansson Bay =

Bay between Law Promontory and Fold Island

Coordinates: 67°20′S 59°8′E

Stefansson Bay is a bay indenting the coast for 16 kilometres (10 mi) between Law Promontory and Fold Island. Mawson of the British Australian New Zealand Antarctic Research Expedition (BANZARE) applied the name to a sweep of the coast west of Cape Wilkins which he observed on about February 18, 1931. Exploration by DI personnel on the William Scoresby, 1936, and the Lars Christensen expedition 1936–37, defined this section of the coast more accurately. It was named for Vilhjalmur Stefansson, Arctic explorer.
