= Georges Louis Duvernoy =

French zoologist

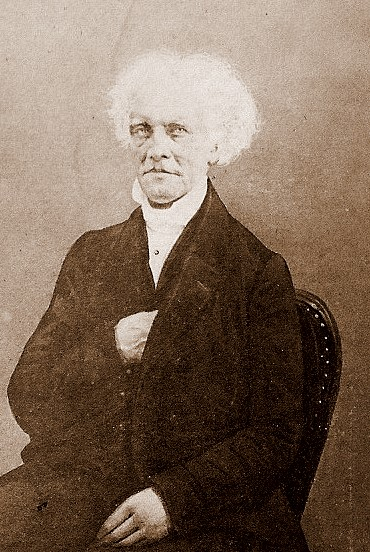
Georges Louis Duvernoy (1777-1855)

Georges Louis Duvernoy (French pronunciation: [ʒɔʁʒ lwi dyvɛʁnwa]; 6 August 1777, Montbéliard, Doubs – 1 March 1855) was a French zoologist. He assisted Georges Cuvier in writing Leçons d'anatomie comparée. He was elected a member of the French Academy of Sciences in 1847 and a foreign member of the Royal Swedish Academy of Sciences in 1851.

He studied in Stuttgart, Strasbourg, and Paris, and in 1802 was asked by Cuvier (a distant cousin) to help edit his masterpiece on comparative anatomy. From notes and counsel from Cuvier, Duvernoy prepared the last three volumes of Leçons d'anatomie comparée, writings that involved respiration, circulation, digestive organs, et al.

In 1805 he returned to Montbéliard, where he worked as a practitioner of medicine. In 1827 he was elected professor to the Faculty of Sciences at Strasbourg, and during the next ten years published a number of treatises on anatomical subjects. After the death of Cuvier in 1832, he worked at arranging his papers for publication. In 1837 he became a professor of natural history at the Collège de France.

== Written works ==
- Dissertation sur l'hystérie, 1801
- Notice historique sur les ouvrages et la vie de M. Le B'on Cuvier, 1833
- Leçons sur l'histoire naturelle des corps organisés, professées au Collège de France, 1839
- Résumé sur le fluide nourricier, ses réservoirs et son mouvement, dans tout le règne animal, 1839
- Notice sur les publications d'anatomie comparée, de physiologie, 1844
- Fragments sur les organes génito-urinaires des reptiles et leurs produits, 1848
- Mémoire sur le système nerveux des mollusques acéphales lamellibranches ou bivalves, 1853
