= Kemp Land =

Australian Antarctic claim

Location of Kemp Land (red), Australian Antarctic Territory in Antarctica

Kemp Land is a thin sliver of Antarctica including, and lying inland from, the Kemp Coast. Part of the Australian Antarctic claim, it is defined as lying between 56° 25' E and 59° 34' E, and, as with other sectors of the Antarctic, is deemed being limited by the 60° S parallel. It is bounded in the east by Mac. Robertson Land and in the west by Enderby Land. Kemp Land includes one major group of islands, the Øygarden Group.

It reaches a height of 3,346 feet above sea level.

== Exploration ==
Named after Peter Kemp, who, in the brig Magnet, is reported to have sighted land in 1833. In 1930, BANZARE under Sir Douglas Mawson in the Discovery delineated the coastline from the junction with Enderby Land to that with Mac. Robertson Land. In 1936 the coast was recharted by RRS William Scoresby.

== See also ==
- List of glaciers of Kemp Land
