= William Scoresby Bay =

Bay in Antarctica

William Scoresby Bay is a coastal embayment at the western side of William Scoresby Archipelago, Antarctica. It is 8 kilometres (5 mi) long and 5.6 kilometres (3.5 mi) wide, with shores marked by steep rock headlands and snow-free hills rising to 210 m. The practical limits of the bay are extended 6.4 kilometres (4 mi) northward, from the coast by island groups located along its east and west margin. Discovered in February 1936 by Discovery Investigations (DI) personnel on the RRS William Scoresby, for which the bay was named. The bay separates the Kemp Coast to the east from the Mawson Coast to the west. The Hobbs Islands sit 19 kilometres (10 nmi) northeast.

Sperring Point (67°24′S 59°31′E) is a rocky point about midway along the west side of the bay. Like the bay, it was discovered and named by DI personnel in February 1936.
