= RRS William Scoresby =

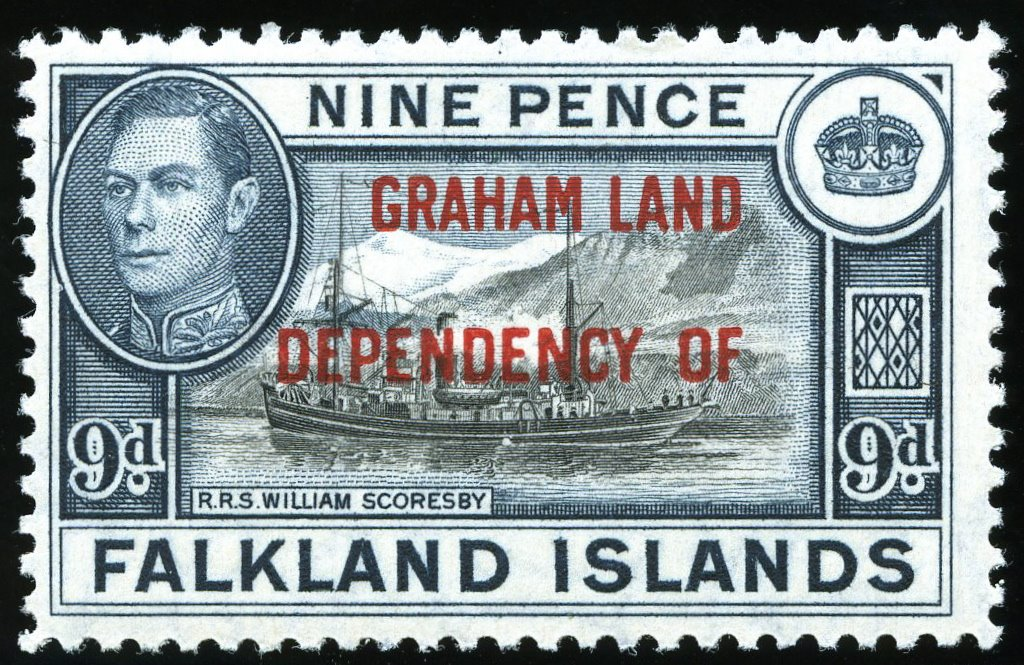
- The RRS William Scoresby on a 1944 stamp of Graham Land

History

United Kingdom
- Name: William Scoresby
- Namesake: William Scoresby
- Builder: Cook, Welton & Gemmell, Beverley
- Yard number: 477
- Launched: 31 December 1925
- Completed: 14 June 1926
- Identification: Official number: 148757
- Fate: Sold for scrapping, 1954

General characteristics
- Type: Royal Research Ship / Naval trawler
- Displacement: 370 long tons (376 t)
- Length: 125 ft (38 m)
- Beam: 26 ft (7.9 m)

RRS William Scoresby was British Royal Research Ship built for operations in Antarctic waters. Specially built for the Discovery Committee by Cook, Welton & Gemmell of Beverley, the ship was launched on 31 December 1925, and named after the noted 19th-century Arctic explorer, scientist and clergyman. Over the next 12 years the ship made seven voyages into Antarctic waters as part of the Discovery Investigations, accompanied by the ship Discovery until 1929, and then by Discovery II. During this time she marked about 3,000 whales and completed biological, hydrographical and oceanographic studies. She also took part in the 2nd Wilkins-Hearst Antarctic Expedition in 1929-1930, launching a Lockheed Vega floatplane for flights over Antarctica.

Laid up in St Katharine Docks in 1938, she was the requisitioned by the Admiralty in October 1939 and converted into a minesweeper. Commissioned as HMS William Scoresby (J122) in June 1940 she was stationed in the Falkland Islands. In early 1944 she took part in Operation Tabarin, establishing British bases in Antarctica. The vessel was decommissioned in September 1946, and transferred to the newly formed National Institute of Oceanography in February 1951. She made one last voyage, surveying the Benguela Current off the west coast of Africa, before finally being sold for scrapping by the British Iron & Steel Corporation in 1954.

== Legacy ==
William Scoresby Bay and the William Scoresby Archipelago, off the Antarctic coast, are named after RRS William Scoresby.
