= MacKenzie Bay =

Bay in Antarctica

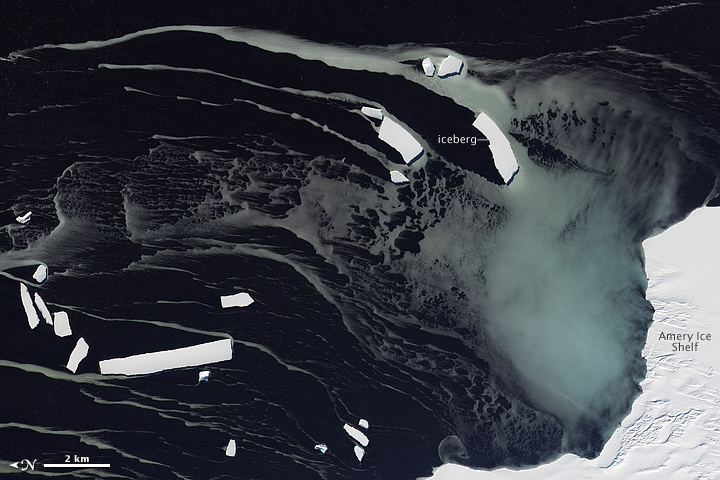
- MacKenzie Bay

- Location in Antarctica
- Location: Mac. Robertson Land
- Coordinates: 68°38′S 70°35′E

MacKenzie Bay is a relatively small embayment of the western extremity of the Amery Ice Shelf, Antarctica, about 20 nautical miles (37 km) northeast of Foley Promontory. On 10 February 1931 the British Australian New Zealand Antarctic Research Expedition (BANZARE) sighted a much larger embayment here and made an airplane flight to sketch its limits. They named it "MacKenzie Sea" after Captain K.N. MacKenzie, the master of the expedition's ship Discovery in 1930–31. Breakout of a large part of Amery Ice Shelf has drastically reduced the size of this feature; in 1968 the bay was 15 nautical miles (28 km) wide. Several Norwegian whaling ships sighted the original embayment nearly simultaneously with BANZARE; the whale-catcher Seksern (Captain Brunvoll) reached this area on 13 January 1931 and the Torlyn (Captain Klarius Mikkelsen) on 13 February 1931.
