= Antarctic Pioneers =

- Directed by: Frank Hurley; Philip Law
- Produced by: Lee Robinson; Frank Bagnall
- Narrated by: John West
- Cinematography: Frank Hurley
- Production company: Commonwealth Film Unit
- Release date: 1963
- Running time: 30 mins
- Country: Australia
- Language: English

Antarctic Pioneers is a 1963 Australian documentary about Australia's history of Antarctic exploration from Sir Douglas Mawson's first expedition in 1911, to the 1954 expedition, under Phillip Law, which established a permanent Australian base on the continent. It was part of the Australia Today series.

It was narrated by Frank Hurley, who died only a few weeks after the movie's completion.
