= Home of the Blizzard =

Home of the Blizzard may refer to:

- The Home of the Blizzard, a 1915 book by Douglas Mawson about the Australasian Antarctic Expedition (AAE) undertaken in 1911–1913
- Home of the Blizzard, a contemporary website about the AAE published by the Australian Government
- Home of the Blizzard (film), a documentary film made up of footage shot by Frank Hurley from the AAE, released in parts from 1912 under other titles
