= Southward Ho with Mawson =

1930 Australian documentary film by Frank Hurley

- Directed by: Frank Hurley
- Starring: Douglas Mawson
- Release date: 1930
- Country: Australia

Southward Ho with Mawson, also spelt Southward Ho! With Mawson, is a 1930 Australian silent documentary film directed and filmed by Frank Hurley about the first BANZARE expedition (1929), led by Douglas Mawson.

The film was a black and white silent film, photographed and directed by Hurley "under the auspices of the Commonwealth Government".

The film was widely screened in cinemas across Australia, with the title variously recorded as having an exclamation mark after the word "Ho". It was sometimes presented as a lecture which included the motion footage, lantern slides, sound effects on disc, and commentary by Hurley. When the film was screened at the Lyceum Theatre in Sydney in August 1930, the Minister for Education encouraged further screenings for schoolchildren.

A second film also made by Hurley, Siege of the South, was released in 1931, capturing the second voyage by BANZARE. This film had a soundtrack.
