= South (film) =

South: Sir Ernest Shackleton's Glorious Epic of the Antarctic
- Directed by: Frank Hurley
- Starring: Ernest Shackleton
- Cinematography: Frank Hurley
- Distributed by: British Film Institute
- Release dates: 1919; 2000 (restoration); 2022 (digitally remastered)
- Running time: 80 minutes
- Country: United Kingdom
- Language: English

South: Sir Ernest Shackleton's Glorious Epic of the Antarctic is a restored version of the 1919 silent film documentary In the Grip of the Polar Pack Ice, photographed and directed by Frank Hurley. The footage was created by Hurley on Ernest Shackleton's expedition to the Antarctic in 1917.

== Synopsis ==
Cinematographer Frank Hurley, who had filmed the led by Australian geologist and explorer Douglas Mawson, which was made into short films and then grouped and variously titled Home of the Blizzard, With Mawson in the South, and Dr. Mawson in the Antarctic, was invited by Sir Ernest Shackleton to accompany him on the Imperial Trans-Antarctic Expedition. The group travelled on Endurance to Antarctica between 1914 and 1916. The ship breaks through ice on its journey southwards, until it becomes trapped after the weather changes and breaks up. 22 men and 70 dogs wait on Elephant Island, while Shackleton and a crew of five take a 20-foot (6.1 m) lifeboat 800 mi (1,300 km) to South Georgia Island to mount a rescue mission. There is much footage of the animals, in particular penguins.

== Release and reception ==
The original black-and-white silent film was released in London in 1919, as In the Grip of the Polar Pack Ice.

The film was restored by the British Film Institute in 1996, and was screened at the Film Center in Chicago in 2000. Roger Ebert gave the 80-minute documentary 3 out of 4 stars. The restoration included tinting and the addition of a piano soundtrack.

A new digitally-remastered version was released in 2022. The premiere screening was accompanied by a live orchestra at the BFI IMAX in London on 27 January. The new print was released in cinemas in the UK from 28 January 2022, and then on Blu-ray and DVD from 28 February. Film critic Peter Bradshaw gave it 4 out of 5 stars in The Guardian.
