= Adelie Hurley =

Australian press photographer

- Born: Sidney Adelie Hurley; 21 May 1919; Sydney, New South Wales, Australia
- Died: 4 March 2010 (aged 90); Coffs Harbour, New South Wales, Australia
- Other names: "Front Page" Hurley
- Occupation: press photographer
- Parent: Frank Hurley

Sidney Adelie Hurley (21 May 1919 – 4 March 2010) was Australia's first woman press photographer. Best known as Adelie Hurley, she was given the nickname "Front Page" Hurley because of her ability to capture images that were used regularly on the front page of the publications to which she contributed.

== Life ==
Sidney Adelie Hurley and her identical twin sister Frances Antoinette (known as Toni) were born in Sydney on 21 May 1919, daughters of Antoinette Rosalind (née Leighton) and photographer Frank Hurley.

As a child, she and her three siblings assisted their father when he was processing film by timing for him. She won a photography competition at the age of 11 with an image she took on a Box Brownie and developed herself. After leaving school, Hurley enrolled in commercial art at Sydney Technical College but left after 18 months as she found it "too narrow and conforming".

In 1938, Hurley began working as a swimsuit model for Pix and The Sun. After joining the Australian Associated Press in 1939, she continued to be featured on magazine covers but also began her photography career. She freelanced for The Sun for some years but they would not employ her full time as there were no female toilets on the floor where the photographers worked.

Hurley was Australia's first woman press photographer and was inducted to the Australian Media Hall of Fame.

In her later years she lived at Coffs Harbour with her sister Toni, where they were known as "Las Presidentas of the Banana Republic" for their efforts in promoting tourism to the area.

== Death and legacy ==
Hurley died on 4 March 2010 in Coffs Harbour.

Examples of her work were included in The Australian Women's Weekly: 90 Years of an Australian Icon exhibition at the Bendigo Art Gallery in 2023. The State Library of New South Wales featured her work in the PIX: The magazine that changed everything (1938–1972) exhibition, curated by Margot Riley in 2024–2026. One of her cameras was also on display and a video interview by Martha Ansara was included.
