= Siege of the South =

1931 Australian documentary film by Frank Hurley

Siege of the South is a 1931 Australian documentary film by Frank Hurley. It was based on footage taken on the second British Australian and New Zealand Antarctic Research Expedition (BANZARE) in 1930-31, led by Douglas Mawson aboard Discovery, and is the official record of the voyage.

An earlier film, a silent film under the title Southward Ho with Mawson, released the previous year, recorded the first BANZARE voyage.

The film debuted in Brisbane, Queensland, in October 1931, and was widely screened across Australia during the remaining months of that year. It was described in one source as "100% talkie, and contain[ing] many songs".

Takings from the film contributed to defray the costs of the expedition, and schoolchildren's attendance contributed significantly to the takings. Union Theatres insisted on Hurley travelling with the film to promote it, and Hurley was keen to make the film a box-office success. He even added scenes with Mickey Mouse and penguins listening to a gramophone in order to appeal to children.

When screened in Queensland, it was reported that the film had been recommended by the state education minister for schoolchildren, and the state government had recommended it to the Commonwealth Government.
