= Kenneth N. MacKenzie =

British explorer (1897–1951)

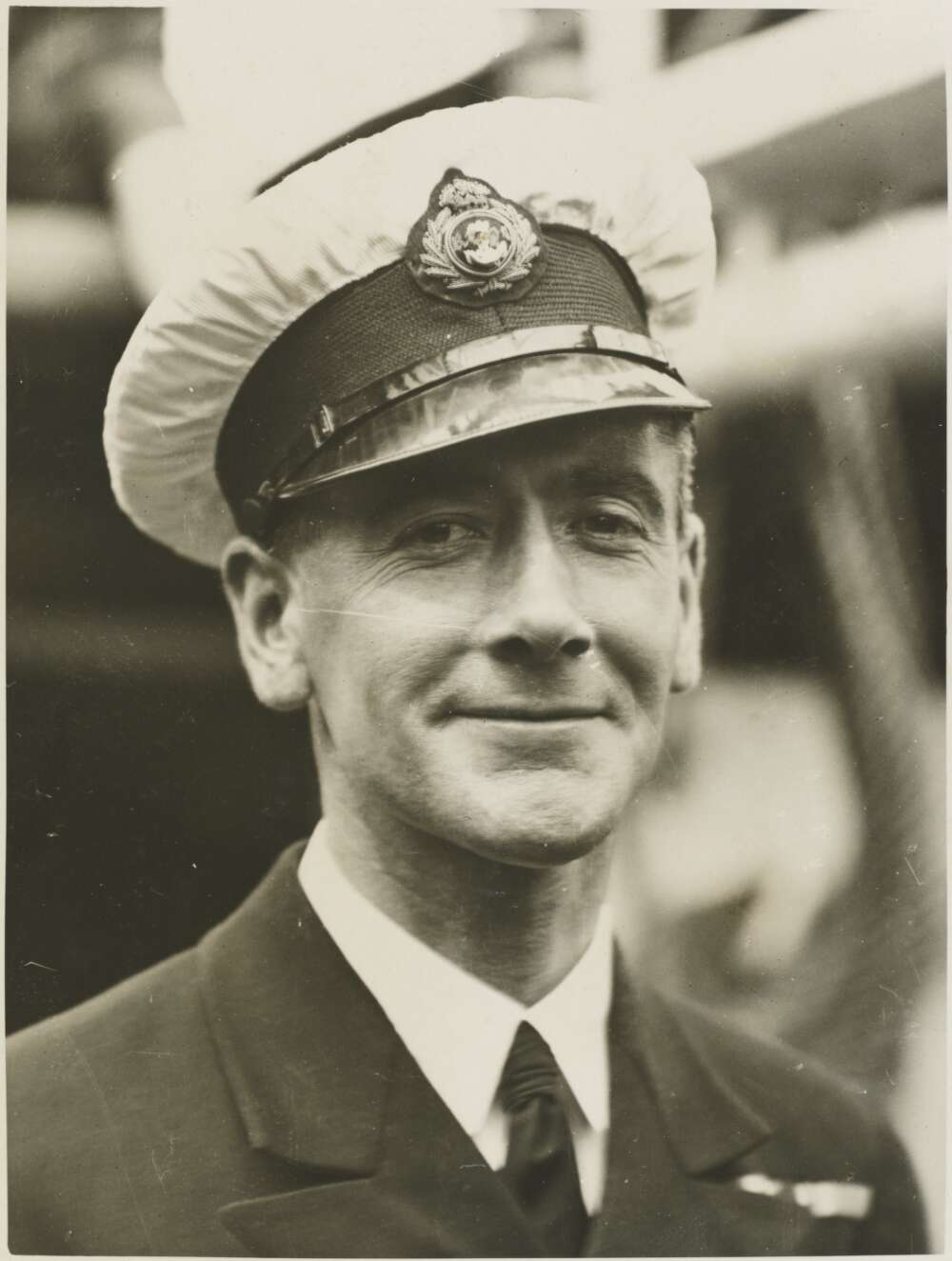
- Born: 26 November 1897; Oban, Scotland
- Died: 29 September 1951 (aged 53)
- Known for: Role during exploration of Antarctica
- Awards: Polar Medal

Kenneth Norman MacKenzie (26 November 1897 – 29 September 1951) was an officer in the merchant fleet known for his role in the British Australian and New Zealand Antarctic Research Expedition, for which he was awarded a Polar Medal.

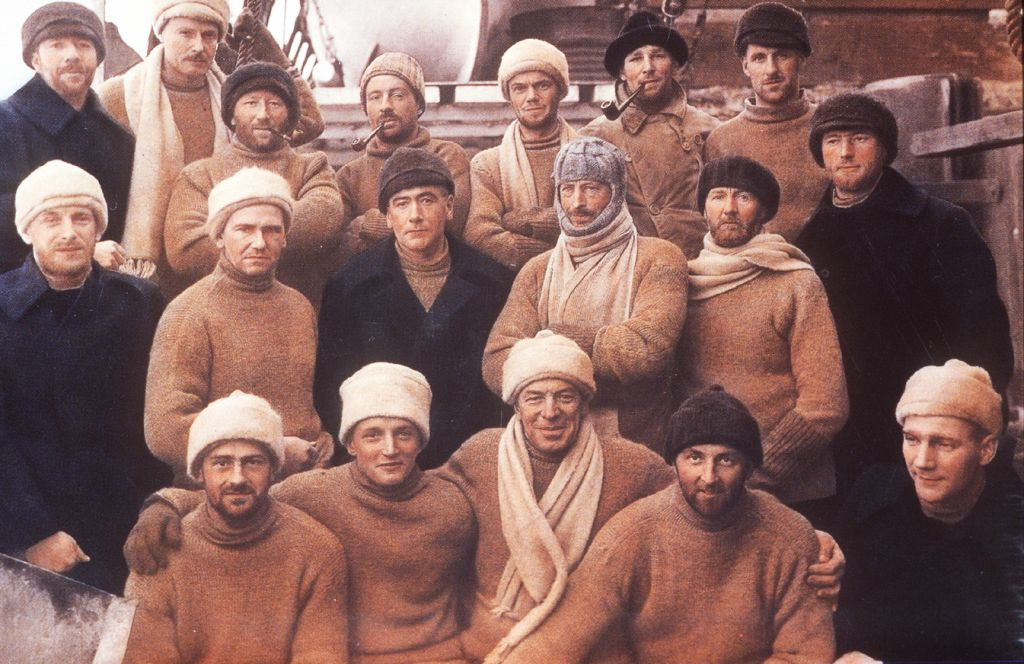
Return of the Discovery in 1931 – MacKenzie (black jacket) standing next to Mawson in balaclava in middle row.

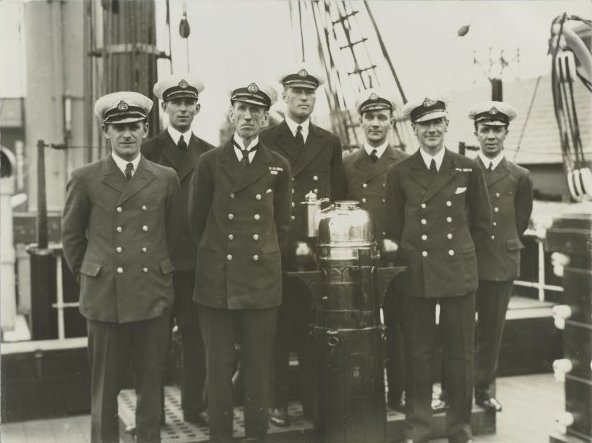
The officers of Discovery – W.G. Griggs, Chief Engineer; Mr. Child, 3rd Officer; J.K. Davis, Master; W.R. Colbeck, 2nd Officer; B.F. Welsh, 2nd Engineer; K.N. MacKenzie, 1st Officer; Wireless Petty-Officer William

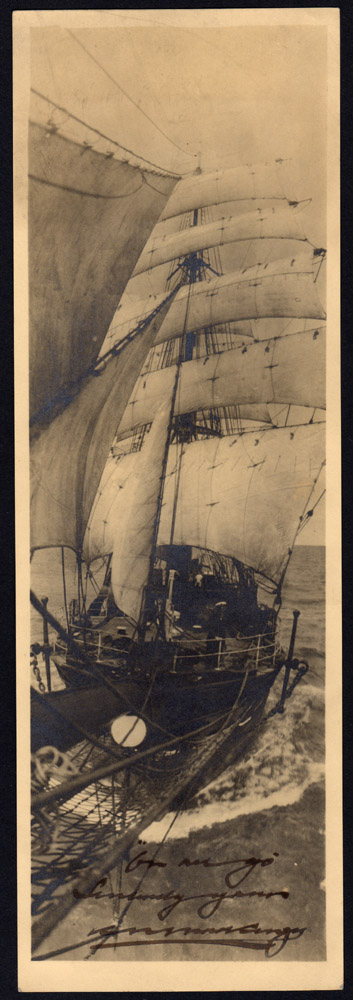
A black and white photograph of RRS Discovery signed by then Captain MacKenzie – inscribed "On we go, sincerely yours". The leader of the BANZARE expedition was Sir Douglas Mawson.

== Early life ==
MacKenzie was born in Oban, Argyllshire on the west coast of Scotland in 1897. His father, Duncan, worked in the town's legal administration. Kenneth was the third of four sons – eldest was William (born 1893) who emigrated to be with his mother's family in New Zealand. He was killed at the age of 22 in 1915 whilst fighting with the ANZACS at Gallipoli. Second was Hamish (born 1895) who emigrated to Canada. He served the Canadian Bank of Commerce and was the bank's Chief Inspector at the Toronto head office until he died of a heart attack in 1949, aged 54. Kenneth was third and Douglas (born 1903); the youngest; was fourth. Douglas spent almost his entire career with the Union-Castle Mail Steamship Company and spent his last eight years out of Southampton as Master of the express mail liner Arundel Castle – a famous ship built with four funnels. He died of a heart attack in 1969.

MacKenzie's parents divorced in 1904 when his mother, Catherine MacKenzie, took her four sons to her father's home in Baugh on the Inner Hebrides island of Tiree. Her father, Duncan MacFarlane, served as the minister in the Baugh Church. Duncan was one of a family of four brothers, all of whom became parish ministers in Scotland (in Tiree, Elgin, Greenock and then in Glenorchy and Tobermory) and all of whom were born on Tiree. Their schooling in Tiree was considered unsatisfactory, being only a small island, so the four MacKenzie sons were sent to stay for their school days with their maternal uncle, Dugald MacFarlane, parish minister for 51 years of St Columba's Church in Kingussie, in Inverness-shire in the heart of the Scottish Highlands. From 1938 to 1939 Dugald was the Moderator of the General Assembly of the Church of Scotland. The Kingussie Public School would seem to have served the boys well and Kenneth MacKenzie learnt to play the bag pipes. In his subsequent life, he was often in demand to write and to give lectures on his experiences.

== First World War ==
Following the outbreak of the First World War, MacKenzie was the first recruit from Tiree. He joined the army by falsifying his age with his mother's connivance. The army quickly identified his correct age and engaged him as an underage soldier, keeping him under training for two years, until he was 18. He was then dispatched to the Western Front to help fill the gaps in the front line of the 2/8th Argyll and Sutherland Highlanders before the Battle of the Somme. He was posted for promotion in-the-field as an officer but, immediately before, he was captured, gassed and buried. Soon, he was rescued and repatriated in a broken condition. He spent over a year in a recuperation hospital in Ripon, emerging grey haired and gaunt.

== Shipping career ==
Having been honourably discharged from the army, he joined the merchant fleet for a year long training as a radio officer. With the war by now drawing to a close, he went to sea in a variety of ships. Shortly after, with his first class Marconi certificate, he was sailing to the far east as Chief Radio Officer in the Blue Funnel liner Titan. However, without any prospect for further promotion, his career was stalled when he resigned to take up employment in the Union Castle Line as an ordinary seaman sailing aboard their cargo liner Dromore Castle, mostly between the USA and South Africa till he was promoted Bosun. Subsequently he sat his certificates as a Watch Officer and then as Master whilst sailing with Glasgow tramp ships and then with liners of the Ellerman City Line.

Whilst berthing in London's West India Docks, MacKenzie, as 2nd Officer of the City of Valencia on an inward voyage from South Africa, saw the wooden sailing ship Discovery. Inquiring of the docking pilot, his enthusiasm was fired; immediately he went aboard, seeking employment for her forthcoming voyage of scientific research and exploration in Antarctica. Shortly after, he was appointed as the ship's Chief Officer when the City Line granted him 'leave of absence with full promotion'.

== Expeditions, marriage and children ==
Kenneth MacKenzie sailed as first officer on the Discovery's first voyage of Antarctic research and exploration. She sailed from London on August 1, 1929 under the command of Captain John Davis, a well-known Antarctic explorer and shipmaster. He had to train his crew, as they were unfamiliar with the ways of a sailing ship. He did this well, and the first voyage of exploration was a success. The ship sailed on and off the Antarctic coastline between 80 and 45 degrees east with the sighting of Kemp and Enderby Lands and the discovery and naming of Mac. Robertson Land. The ship returned to Melbourne from the Antarctic where MacKenzie took command during November 1930 whilst Captain Davis returned to the service of the commonwealth government as Director of Navigation.

On the Discovery's second Antarctic voyage (from 1930 – 1931), she navigated along the Antarctic Coast from 178 to 62 degrees east with sightings and landings on King George V land and the discovery and naming of Princess Elizabeth Land and Banzare Land. The name "Princess Elizabeth Land" was selected on MacKenzie’s suggestion. And the newly discovered 'MacKenzie Sea' in 72 degrees east was named after him. Again the voyage went well; she returned to Hobart and then Melbourne in March 1931. With her scientific and exploration work completed, MacKenzie sailed the ship back to London by way of Wellington and the Cape Horn arriving back in London’s East India Dock in August 1931. She was found to be in an excellent condition and undamaged. Subsequently MacKenzie was awarded the Polar Medal inscribed "Antarctica 1929–1931", by King George V at Buckingham Palace, London.

The MacKenzie Bay, located on the edge of the Amery Ice Shelf, Antarctica, is named after him.

MacKenzie returned to the service of the City Line who appointed him as Chief Officer of their steamer City of Dieppe. On one of her voyages to Australia, MacKenzie met Lillian Green, an Australian farmer's daughter whom he subsequently married.

Then, in 1933, MacKenzie was invited by the committee of the John Murray Expedition to take command of the new research ship Mabahiss, an Egyptian naval vessel. She was to conduct voyages of oceanographic research of the north western Indian Ocean with scientific staff from Cambridge and Cairo Universities. Again MacKenzie was granted "leave of absence with full promotion" by the Ellerman City Line, whilst he was gazetted into the Egyptian Navy with the rank of "Bimbashi" (commander). He then sailed in command from Alexandria in September 1933 making continuous voyages of research in the Indian Ocean until the ship's safe return to Alexandria in May 1934.

On his return to London, MacKenzie was appointed as Assistant Marine Superintendent of the Ellerman Lines based in the firm's London head office. Shortly after, he resigned to join the London, Midland and Scottish Railways, subsequently British Railways, as Assistant Marine Superintendent in their London Euston head office in the administration of the railway's fleet of cross channel steamers and mail ports. In 1935, he was promoted to Harbour Master and Marine Superintendent at Holyhead in Anglesey serving the express London to Dublin mail route.

MacKenzie and his wife had two daughters, born in 1934 and 1943 and a son, born in 1938. His later life was troubled by ill health but he greatly enjoyed his family life and his work managing the port of Holyhead, its fleet of express mail and cargo steamers, its dry docks and shipyard and its major port of refuge.

His health, never really good after his experiences in the First World War, had a sharp setback when he suffered a heart attack in 1938. He never recovered but worked on under increasing debility and strain till he died in 1951, still only 53 years of age.
