= Pearls and Savages =

1921 film by Frank Hurley

- Directed by: Frank Hurley
- Written by: Frank Hurley
- Cinematography: Frank Hurley
- Release dates: December 1921 (orig. version); October 1923 (amended version)
- Country: Australia
- Language: Silent

Pearl and Savages is a 1921 documentary by filmmaker Frank Hurley about the people of Papua New Guinea and Torres Strait.

== Production ==
Hurley left for Papua in December 1920 to record the work of Anglican missionaries in the region. He made the documentary which was a popular success on release in 1921, with Hurley often accompanying screenings to give a lecture. He also wrote a book to accompany the film.

Reviews were strong, one critic calling it "probably the most beautifully photographed pictorial of the kind that has ever been screened."

== Second Visit and With the Headhunters in Papua ==
Hurley then visited Papua again at his own expense in 1923 to shoot additional footage. He was accompanied by Allan McCullock from the Australian Museum in Sydney. During the trip, they obtained hundreds of cultural objects, angering the administrator of Papua at the time, Sir Herbert Murray. Murray arranged for some objects to be returned to their owners, but the rest were deposited in the Australian Museum. In 1925, Murray refused to allow Hurley to enter Papua to make another film.

Hurley incorporated the new footage into the documentary. The new film was called With the Headhunters in Papua and released in October 1923.

== The Lost Tribe ==
Hurley took the movie to America, where it was screened under the title The Lost Tribe, but it did not meet with popular success and he wound up losing thousands of pounds. Hurley once claimed that a screening in Philadelphia was attended by only five people. It also did not perform particularly well in England, although the film managed a sale of £1,500 to Germany.

This prompted Hurley to move into dramatic feature film making with Jungle Woman (1926) and The Hound of the Deep (1926).

The company Hurley used to make the film was voluntarily wound up in 1927.

== Reconstruction ==
In 1979, the film was reconstructed by Keith Pardy from the National Film Archive of the National Library of Australia using material such as a 1925 program brochure, Hurley's diaries, and his book Pearls and Savages: Adventures in the Air, On Land and Sea in New Guinea (1924).
