= Frank Hurley =

Australian photographer (1885–1962)

Frank Hurley OBE
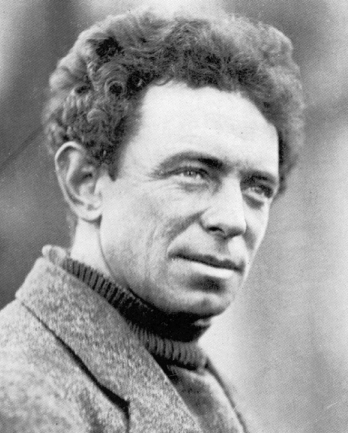
- Hurley around 1914
- Born: James Francis Hurley; 15 October 1885; Glebe, New South Wales, Australia
- Died: 16 January 1962 (aged 76); Collaroy Plateau, New South Wales, Australia
- Children: Four, including Adelie Hurley
- Military career
- Allegiance: Australia
- Branch: First Australian Imperial Force; Australian Army
- Service years: 1917–1918, 1940
- Rank: Captain
- Unit: 1st Division (Australia)
- Conflicts: Battle of Passchendaele and the Battle of Bardia
- Other work: 1908–1948

James Francis Hurley OBE (15 October 1885 – 16 January 1962) was an Australian photographer, cinematographer of documentary films, and director of drama feature films. He participated in a number of expeditions to Antarctica and served as an official war photographer with Australian forces during both world wars. He was the official photographer for the Australasian Antarctic Expedition (1911–14) led by Douglas Mawson, the Imperial Trans-Antarctic Expedition of 1914–16 led by Ernest Shackleton, and BANZARE (1929–31), again led by Mawson.

His artistic style produced many memorable images. He also used staged scenes, composites, and photographic manipulation.

== Early life and education ==
Frank Hurley was born on 15 October 1885, the third of five children to parents Edward and Margaret Hurley and was raised in Glebe, a suburb of Sydney, Australia. He attended Glebe Public School. He ran away from home at 14 to work as a fitter's handyman at the Lithgow steel mill, and then served an apprenticeship in engineering until he was 18.

He bought his first camera from the foreman at the steel mill for 15 shillings, which he paid for at the rate of a shilling per week. He taught himself photography and soon bought other cameras. He began his photographic career at the age of 20, working for a postcard company in Sydney.

== Antarctic expeditions ==
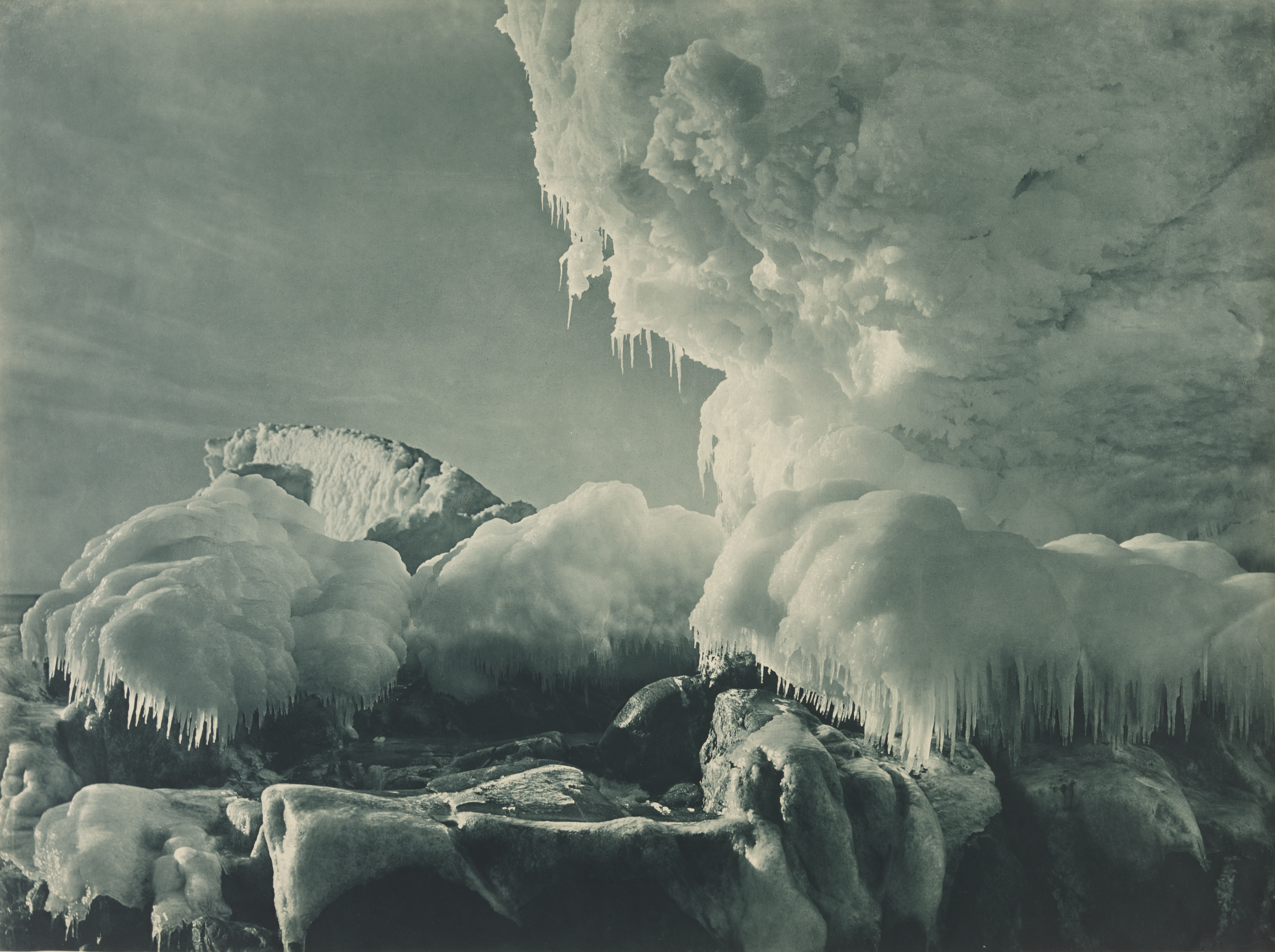
Ice forming on rocks, Cape Denison, Antarctica, 1912

During his lifetime, Hurley spent more than four years in Antarctica.

At the age of 23, in 1908, Hurley learned that Australian geologist and explorer Douglas Mawson was planning an expedition to Antarctica. In 1911, fellow Sydneysider Henri Mallard recommended Hurley for the position of official photographer to Mawson's Australasian Antarctic Expedition—ahead of himself. (Note: while Hurley records his approach to Mawson differently in his memoir, the fact of this introduction via Mallard was established by David P. Millar in Millar (1984).) Hurley asserts in his biography that he then cornered Mawson as he was making his way to their interview on a train, using the advantage to talk his way into the job. (Note: Jack Cato, in his obituary for Hurley, explains Hurley's motivation and enthusiasm; "We were both fired with the Spirit of Adventure. We were both happy in the knowledge that the camera was the key that would open that magic door." Cato, Jack, 'For the Late Frank Hurley, Three Tributes', Australian Popular Photography, March 1962.) Mawson was persuaded, while Mallard, who was the manager of Harringtons, a local Kodak franchise, to which Hurley was in debt, provided photographic equipment.

Although the official photographer there were some 19 other photographers who recorded the expedition which was divided across the three separate locations. Hurley was with Mawson's group at Cape Denison where the weather was so bad that Hurley claimed he had only ten absolutely calm days scattered throughout the year 1912–1913, and this was when he took many of his photos, making 82 photos on the first three days of September 1912.

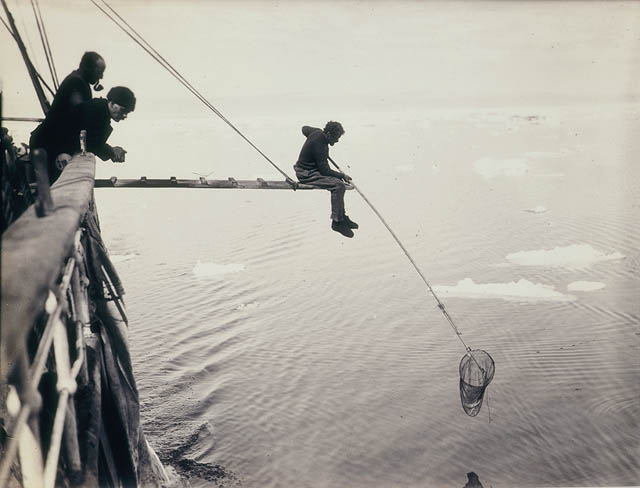
Harold Hamilton hand-netting from SY Aurora, a photo by Hurley

The expedition departed in 1911 and Hurley returned with most of the party in early 1913. However Mawson was left behind as he was late returning from his sledging party, after the death of Xavier Mertz, and as a result Hurley made a second trip at the end of 1913 to pick up the remaining party. On this trip he took another series of photos before returning in early 1914. Some of his photos included advertising. Funds had to be raised to pay the expedition's debts after the event through film screenings, books and photographs.

Before his return in 1913, footage attributed to him was released in cinemas. Now often referred to as Home of the Blizzard, this silent film has a complicated provenance, and it is no longer known which reels were shown in the 1913 cinema showing. This version of the film was released in the UK as Life in the Antarctic.

Mawson and Hurley were horrified at the widespread killing of seals and whales by sealers and whalers, and subsequently used their influence to attempt to bring the penguin oil industry on Macquarie Island to a halt. The island was declared a wildlife sanctuary in 1933, and in 1997 was listed as a World Heritage Site.

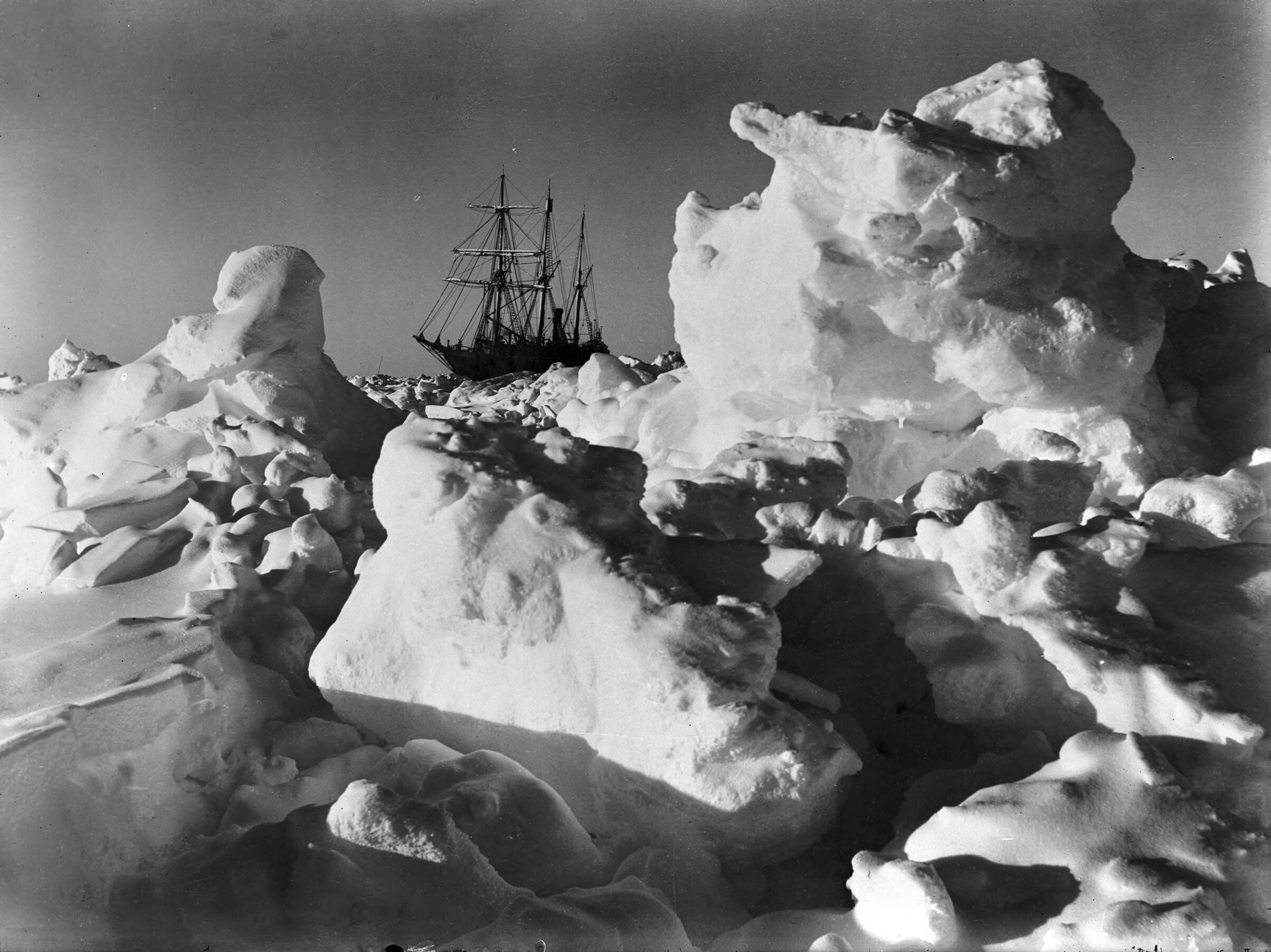
Endurance among ice pinnacles, Shackleton expedition, February 1915

Hurley was the official photographer on Sir Ernest Shackleton's Imperial Trans-Antarctic Expedition, hired on condition that he would make a film recording events on the expedition. The group set out in 1914 and was marooned until August 1916, after their ship was crushed by ice. Hurley's photographic kit for the expedition included the cinematograph machine, plate still camera, and several smaller Kodak cameras, along with various lenses, tripods, and developing equipment, most of which had to be abandoned with the loss of their ship Endurance in 1915. He kept only a hand-held Vest Pocket Kodak camera and three rolls of film and for the rest of the expedition, he shot just 38 images. He also selected and saved 120 of his glass-plate negatives, smashing about 400 remaining ones. Some of the plates from the expedition are now part of the State Library of New South Wales collection. A documentary silent film was assembled from his footage, first released as In the Grip of the Polar Pack Ice in 1919. The film was restored by the British Film Institute in 1996 as South: Sir Ernest Shackleton's Glorious Epic of the Antarctic, with a digitally-remastered version re-released in 2022.

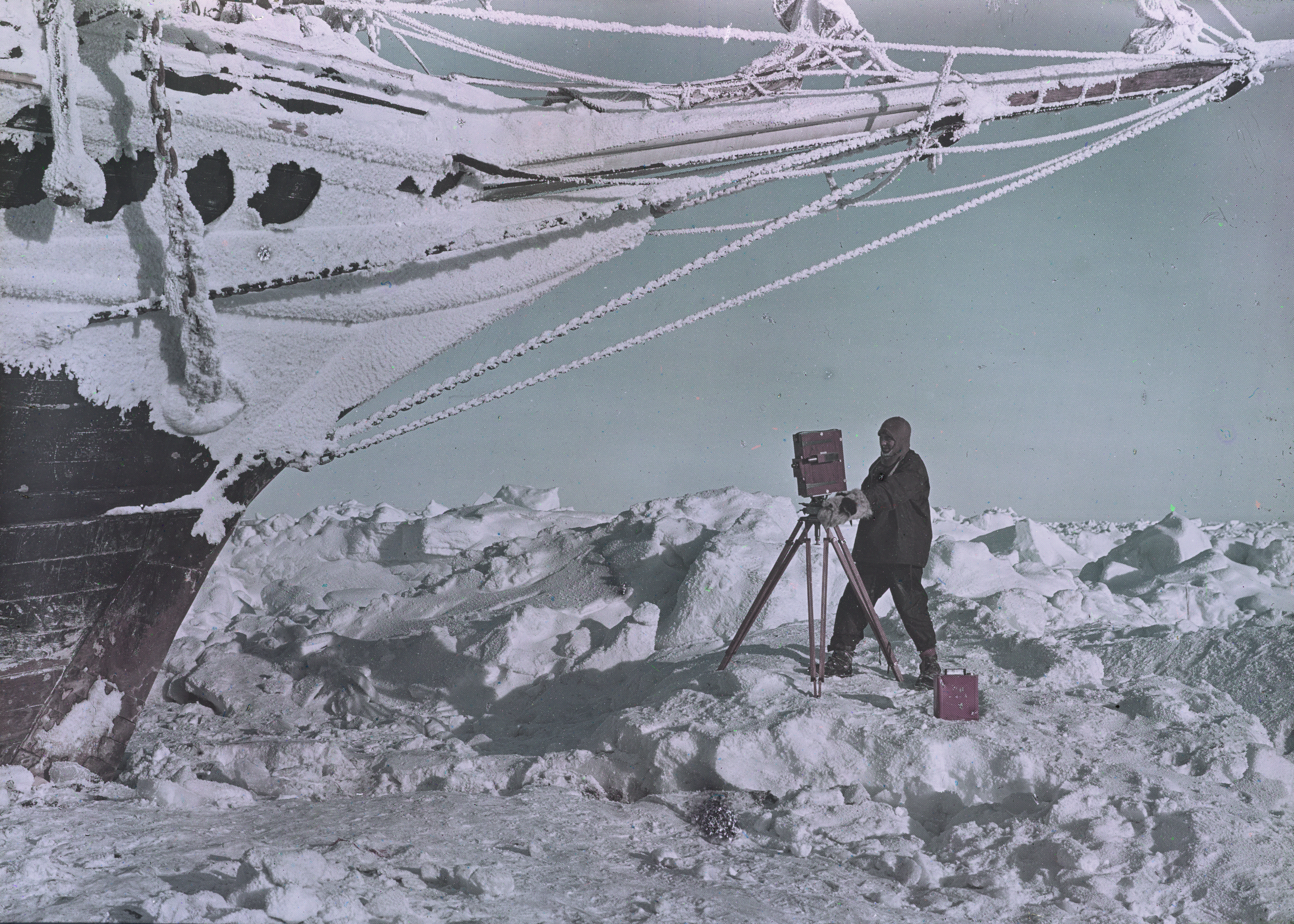
Hurley photographing under the bow of Endurance, 1915

Hurley produced many pioneering colour images of the expedition using the then-popular Paget process of colour photography. He took photos in South Georgia in 1917. He later compiled his records into a documentary film released in 1919 as In the Grip of the Polar Pack Ice. In 1996 the silent version was restored as a standalone film titled South: Sir Ernest Shackleton's Glorious Epic of the Antarctic. His footage was also used in the 2001 IMAX film Shackleton's Antarctic Adventure.

Hurley returned to the Antarctic in 1929 and 1931, on Mawson's British Australian and New Zealand Antarctic Research Expedition (known as BANZARE). Footage taken by Hurley was commercially as a silent film in 1930 as Southward Ho With Mawson, which was re-released as Siege of the South in 1931, this time with a soundtrack added. Takings from Siege of the South contributed to defray the costs of the expedition, and schoolchildren's attendance contributed significantly to the takings. Union Theatres insisted on Hurley travelling with the film to promote it, and Hurley was keen to make the film a box-office success. He even added scenes with Mickey Mouse and penguins listening to a gramophone in order to appeal to children.

== World War One ==
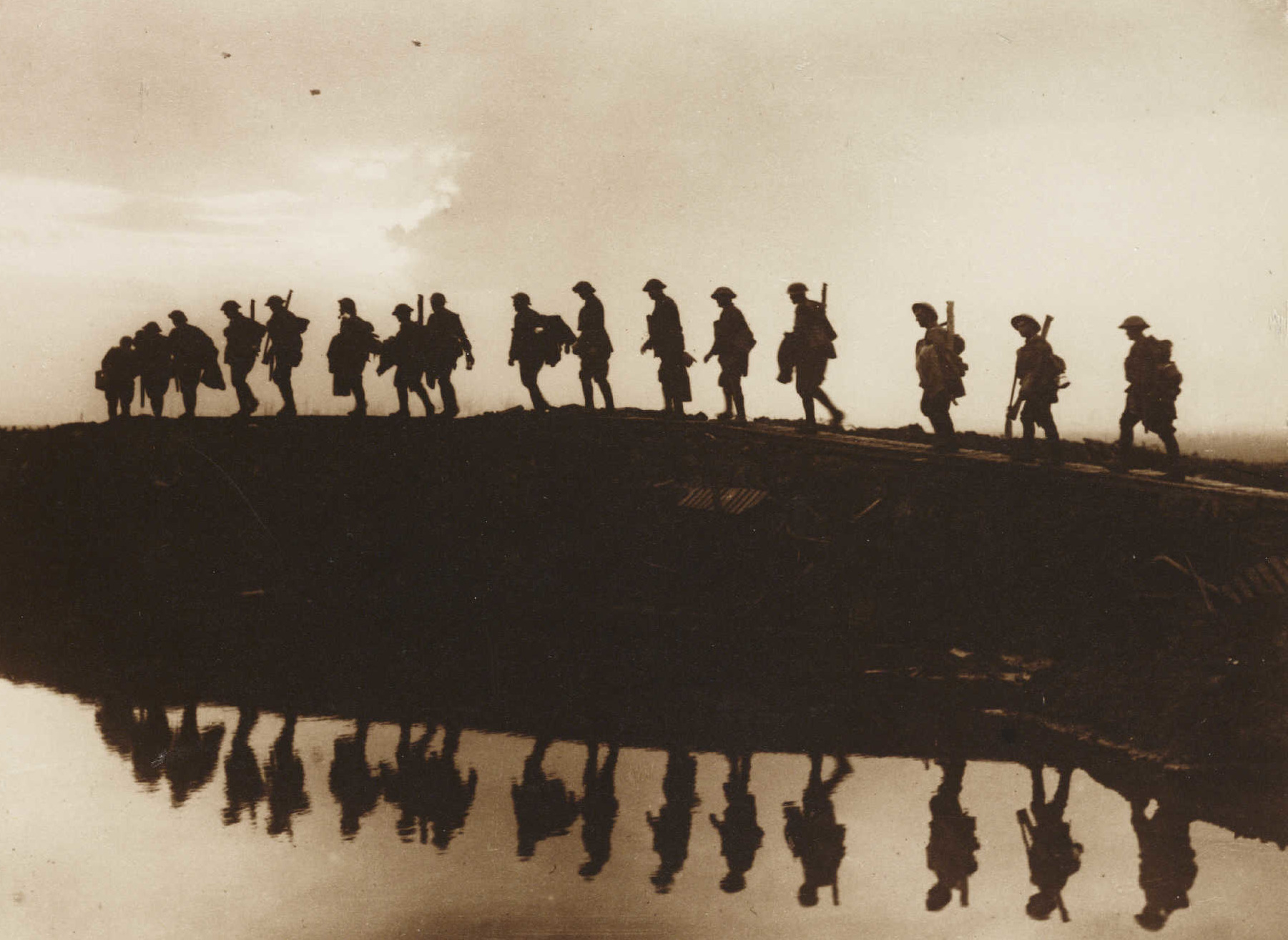
1st Australian Division near Ypres, 1917

In 1917, Hurley joined the Australian Imperial Force (AIF) as an honorary captain, and captured many stunning battlefield scenes during the Third Battle of Ypres. In keeping with his adventurous spirit, he took considerable risks to photograph his subjects, also producing many rare panoramic and colour photographs of the conflict. Hurley kept a diary from 1917 to 1918, chronicling his time as a war photographer. In it, he described his commitment "to illustrate to the public the things our fellows do and how war is conducted", and his short-lived resignation in October 1917 when he was ordered not to produce composite images—a practice that was especially popular among professional photographers at the time and one that he believed could portray the disgust and horror that he felt during the war in such a way that his audience would feel it too.

Some of his most well-known photographs were of the Battle of Passchendaele in the latter half of 1917. After conflict occurred between Hurley and official war historian Charles Bean about Hurley's use of composite images, Hurley was dispatched to Palestine in late 1917.

His period with the AIF ended in March 1918.

=== Composite photography ===
Printed reproductions of a composite image created by Hurley and two of the photographs on which it was based. Hurley argued with superiors over the ethics of compositing photos, arguing that war was conducted on such a vast scale that it was impossible to capture the essence of it in a single negative. Some have considered the practice as an art form; others have argued that history demands the plain, simple truth. For the 1918 London exhibition, Australian War Pictures and Photographs, he employed composites for photomurals to convey drama of the war on a scale otherwise not possible using the technology available. This brought Hurley into conflict with the AIF on the grounds that montage diminished documentary value. He wrote that he would dress in civilian clothes and eavesdrop on soldiers who were visiting his exhibitions; he concluded that the composites were justified by the favourable comments they attracted. (Note: For an account of the conflict between Hurley and the war correspondent Charles Bean, see Gough, Paul. "'Exactitude is truth': representing the British military through commissioned artworks". Journal of War and Culture Studies Volume: 1)

Charles Bean, official war historian, labelled Hurley's composite images "fake".

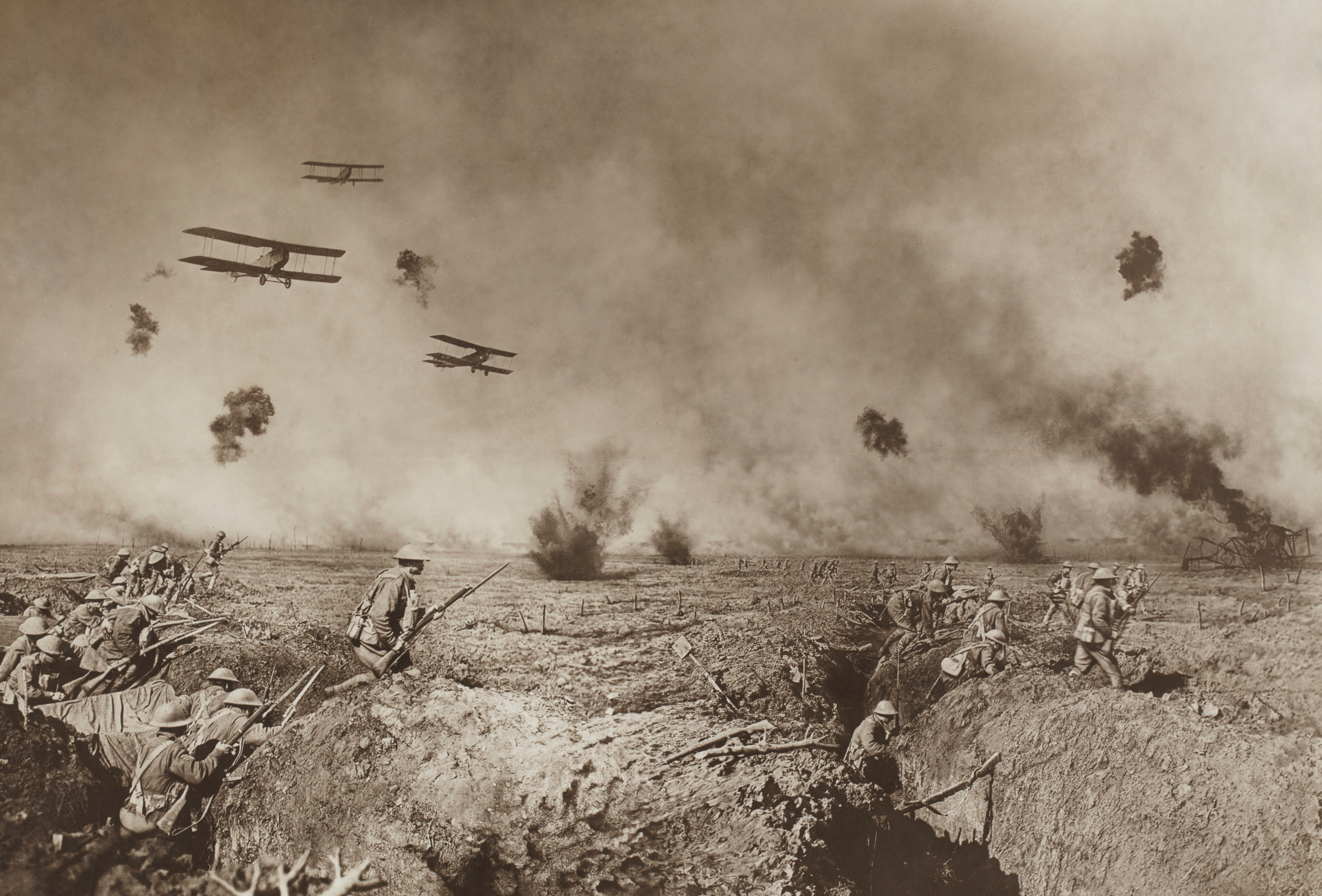
Composite photograph, Battle of Zonnebeke, Belgium, 1917

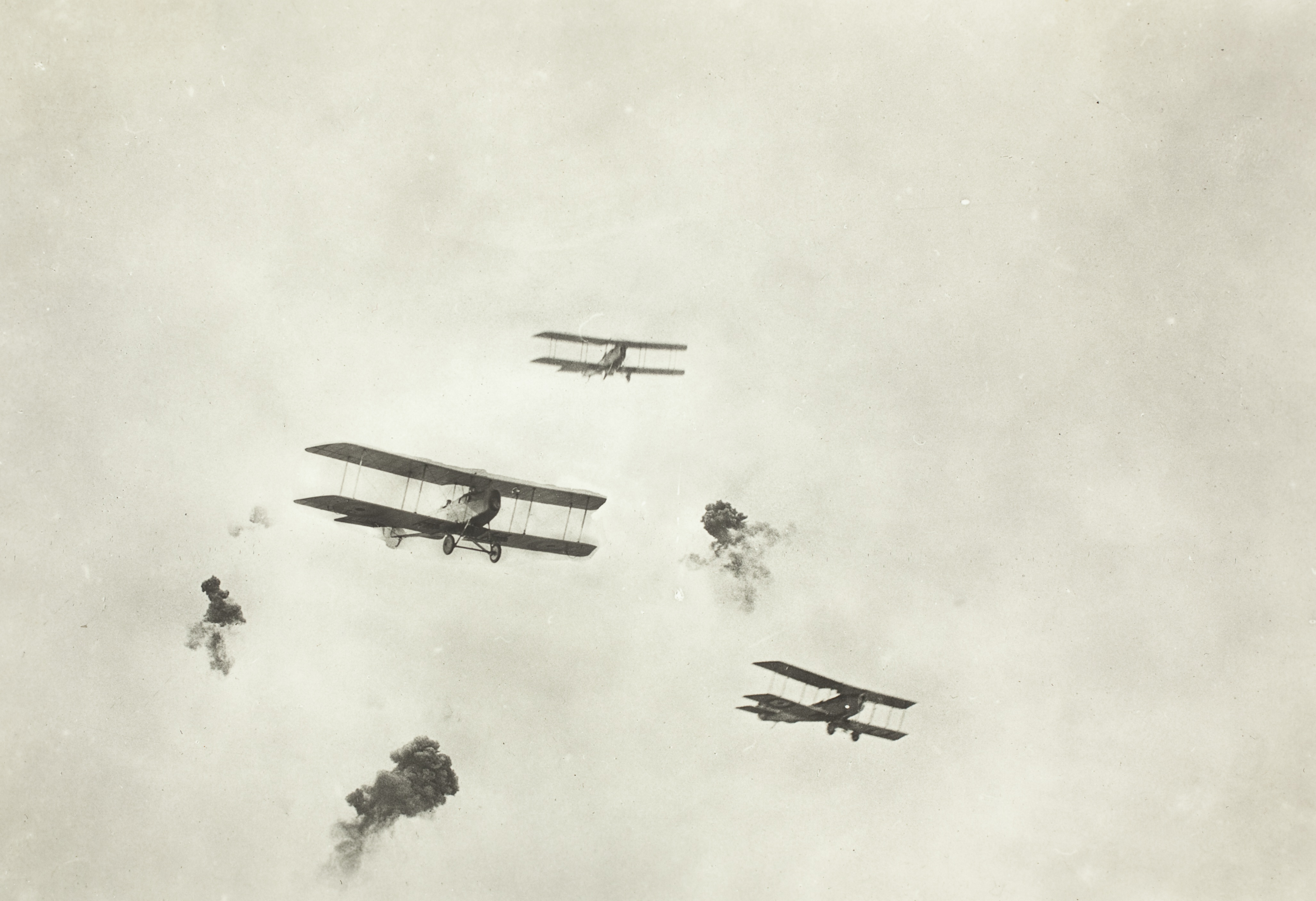
Shrapnel bursts among scout planes, France, 1917–1918, used in composite

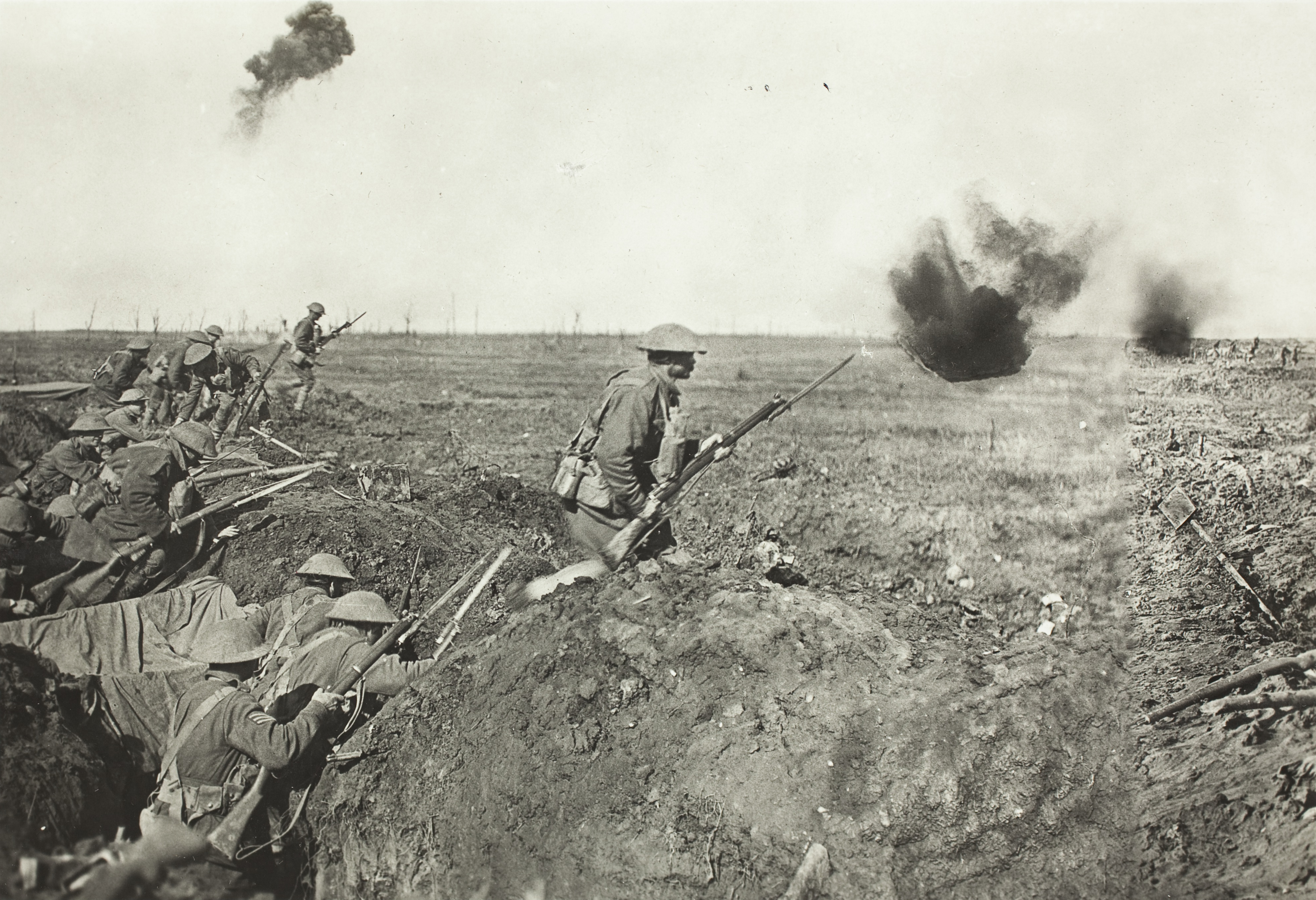
Over the top, Zonnebeke, 1917, used in composite

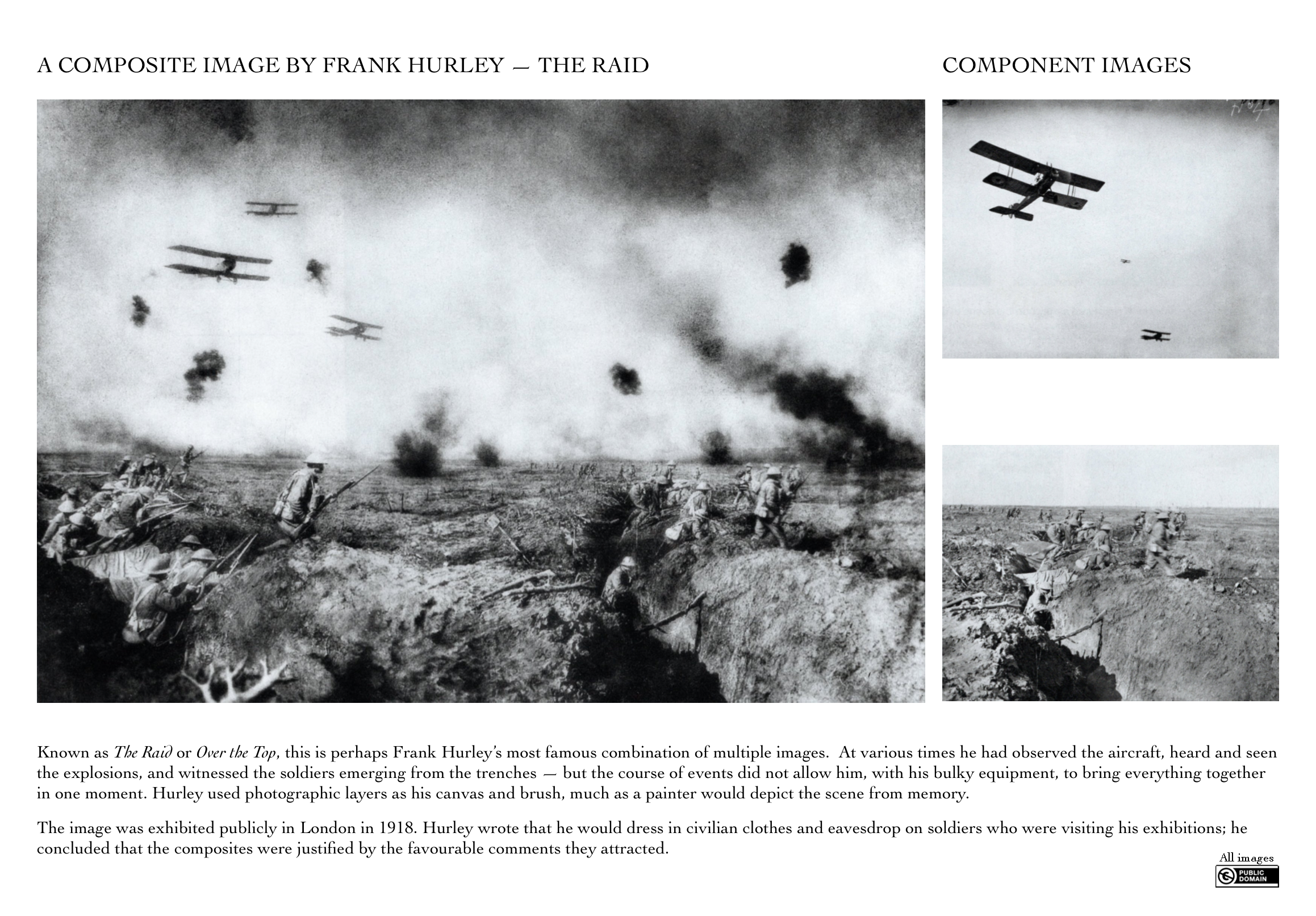
Printed outline of composite

== World War Two ==
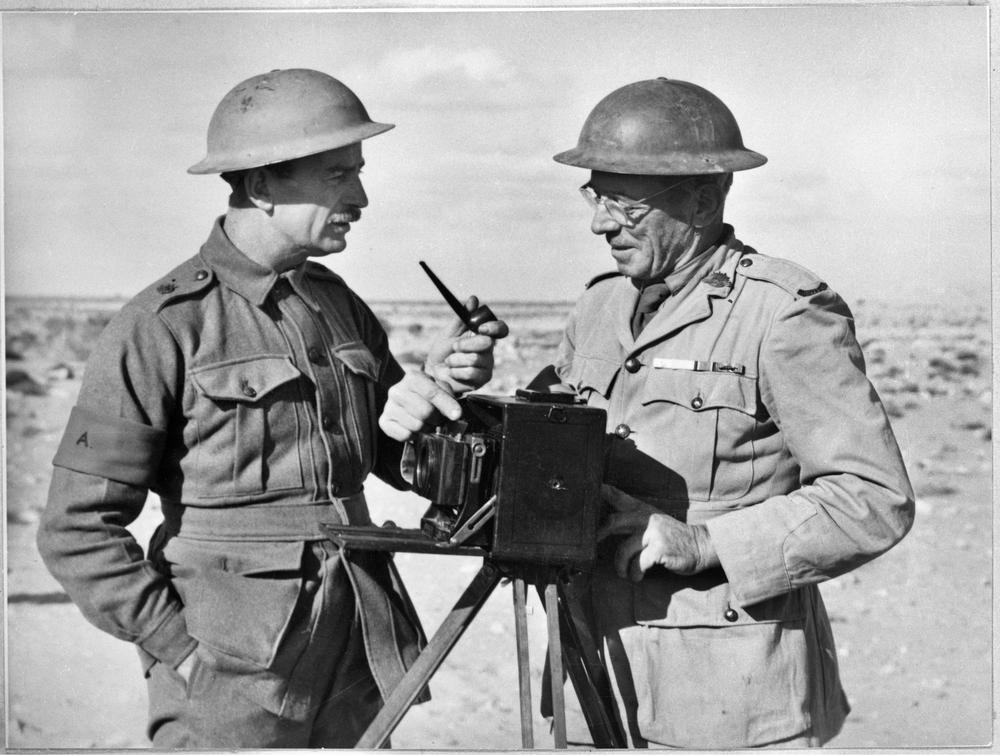
Hurley (right) discusses photographic opportunities for the forthcoming battle of Bardia in Egypt, 1940.

Hurley again worked as an official photographer during the Second World War. He was employed by the Australian Department of Information as head of the Photographic Unit from September 1940 until early 1943, based in Cairo, Egypt. He took the only film of the initial victory against the Italians at Sidi Barrani in December 1940, which was given to Cinesound and Movietone News for global release. He also covered the Battle of Bardia and the Siege of Tobruk in 1941, and both of the battles at El Alamein in 1942. Several volumes of his War Diaries cover this period.

In early 1943, the AIF 9th Division was recalled to Australia to fight the Japanese forces in the Pacific theatre. Hurley resigned his position, but remained in the Middle East, and accepted the position of Middle East Director of Army Features and Propaganda Films with the British Ministry of Information. In this capacity, he travelled a reported 200,000 mi (320,000 km), covering the region from Libya to Persia, making regular items for War Pictorial News and two-reel features. He photographed two conferences of leaders at Cairo and Tehran in 1943. Only one diary volume survives for this period. It includes a summary of his 1943 work, and covers a four-month journey from Cairo to Tehran commencing in February 1944, during which he took footage for The Road to Russia (1944); A Day in the Life of a King (1944); possibly the first film of the Marsh Arabs (an indigenous people of southern Iraq), Garden of Eden (1945); and one other feature about Tehran itself. Other features of this period include Cairo (1944), and The Holy Land (1945).

Hurley returned to Australia in September 1946.

== Other activities and work ==
After returning from Mawson's first expedition in 1913, Hurley travelled to Arnhem Land with Frank Birtle to film the Aboriginal people in northern Australia.

In 1919 Hurley joined Ross Macpherson Smith when he arrived in Australia, writing a book about him and producing a film of his flight, called The Ross Smith Flight. Smith, with his brother Keith and two other men, were the first Australians in a British aircraft to fly from Great Britain to Australia, landing in Darwin.

Hurley wrote a book based on his 1921 film Pearls and Savages, which he wrote in ten days and was published and distributed within three weeks in New York City.

In the early 1920s he undertook a flight with Jimmy Moir and Harold Owens in an attempt to break a record on a flight from Australia to London, but the plane crashed in Athens, Greece.

== Cinematography and filmmaking ==
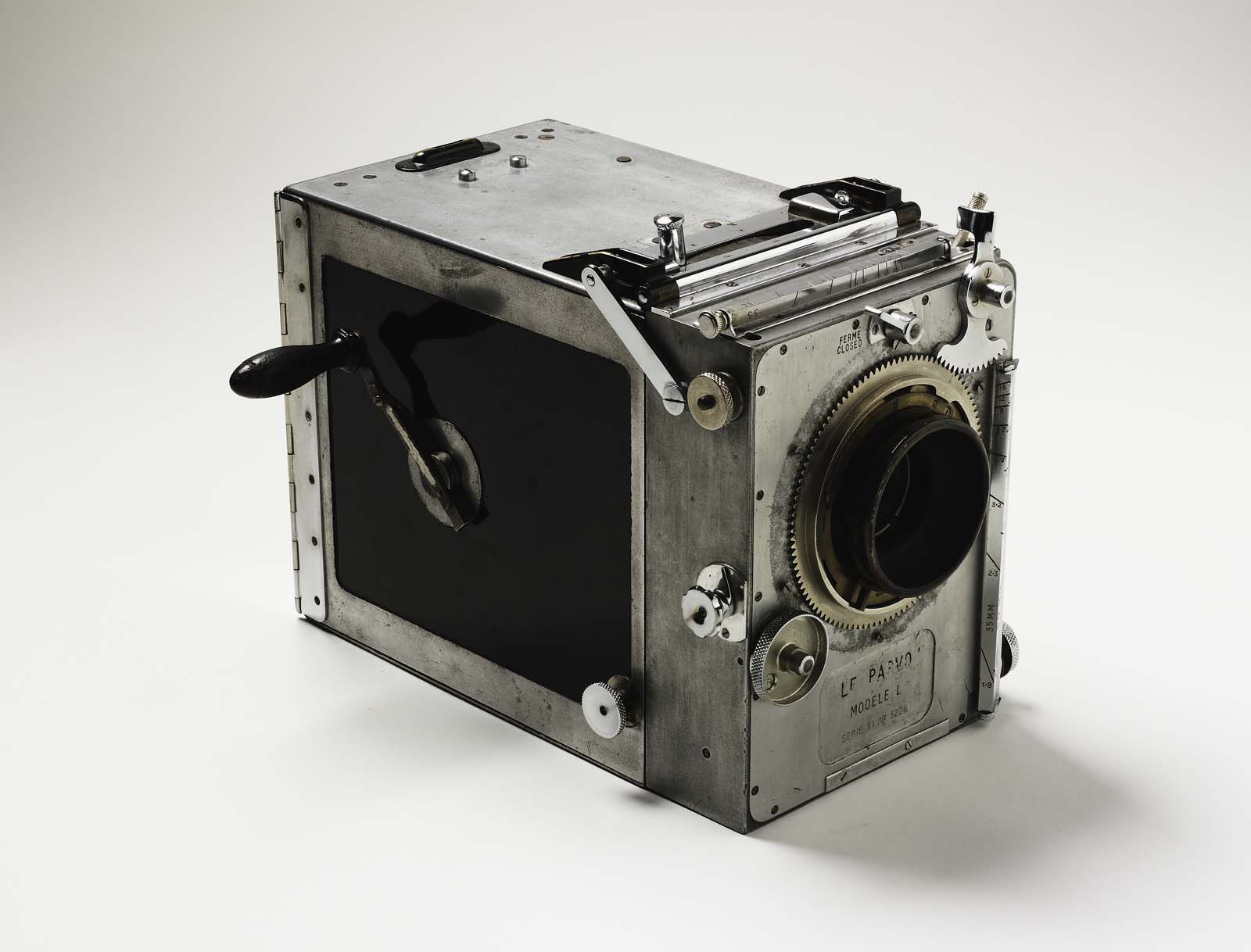
Hurley's Debrie Parvo L 35 mm hand-crank camera, now held at the National Museum of Australia

Hurley also used a film camera to record a range of experiences including the Antarctic expeditions (see above); the building of the Sydney Harbour Bridge; and war in the Middle East during World War II. The camera was a Debrie Parvo L 35 mm hand-crank camera made in France. This camera is now in the collection of the National Museum of Australia.

Hurley made several documentaries throughout his career, most notably Pearls and Savages (1921), which he directed and produced. This film was the result of extensive surveying, photographic, and scientific work carried out by Hurley on an expedition to New Guinea, using two seaplanes provided by Lebbeus Hordern. After claiming to have discovered one of the Lost Tribes of Israel in New Guinea, the film garnered much publicity in New York City, and Putnam's asked him to write a book. Hurley wrote a book of the same name in ten days, which was published and distributed within three weeks. The film was very successful in London, leading to entrepreneur Sir Oswald Stoll contracting Hurley to produce two dramatic films in New Guinea. Hurley assembled a cast and took them from London to New Guinea in 1925. Hurley was refused entrance to Papua, partly due to his sensationalistic stories of head-hunters, but also due to his allegedly improper methods used to gather many artefacts for the Australian Museum in Sydney. The crew relocated to Dutch New Guinea to make the dramatic feature film Jungle Woman (released May 1926). Hurley then made The Hound of the Deep, which was made for Stoll on Thursday Island and released in 1926.

He worked as cinematographer for Cinesound Productions in Sydney for most of the 1930s, where his best known film credits include The Squatter's Daughter (1933), The Silence of Dean Maitland (1934) and Grandad Rudd (1935).

Hurley wrote the original story and script for the film Tall Timber (1937), but it was greatly rewritten.

== Personal life ==
Hurley married Antoinette Rosalind Leighton on 11 April 1918. The couple had four children: identical twin daughters, Adelie (later a press photographer) and Toni, one son, Frank, and youngest daughter Yvonne.

Hurley was very resourceful, and acquired a reputation as a daredevil, for taking risks in the pursuit of a good shot.

== Death and legacy ==
Hurley died of cardiac infarction on 16 January 1962 in Collaroy Plateau, New South Wales.

His photographic work influenced later generations of photographers.

Several of his films have been restored, with some regarded as classics in Australian cinema. He also published many books, and his diaries were published in 2011.

Along with Mawson's and other books produced about Antarctica, Hurley's photographs and films helped to raise public awareness of the importance of preserving Antarctica and the sub-Antarctic islands from exploitation.

== Selected filmography ==
- Dr. Mawson in the Antarctic (1912+; also known as Home of the Blizzard) – cinematographer
- Into Australia's Unknown (1915) – director and cinematographer
- In the Grip of the Polar Pack Ice (1919) – director and cinematographer
- Pearls and Savages (1921) – director and producer
- Jungle Woman (1926) – director
- The Hound of the Deep (1926) – director
- Southward Ho With Mawson (1930)
  - Siege of the South (1931) – re-release of the above, with soundtrack
- Symphony in Steel (1932) – director
- The Squatter's Daughter (1933) – cinematographer
- Strike Me Lucky (1934) – cinematographer
- Grandad Rudd (1935) – cinematographer
- Tall Timber (1937) – original story; greatly re-written
- Lovers and Luggers (1937) – second unit
- A Nation is Built (1937) – director
- 40,000 Horsemen (1940) – cinematographer

== See also ==
- Photography in Australia
