= British Australian and New Zealand Antarctic Research Expedition =

1929–1931 Antarctic research expedition

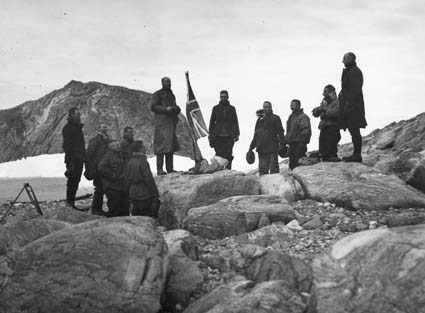
- Start: 1929
- Participants: Douglas Mawson; Robert Falla; Thomas Harvey Johnston

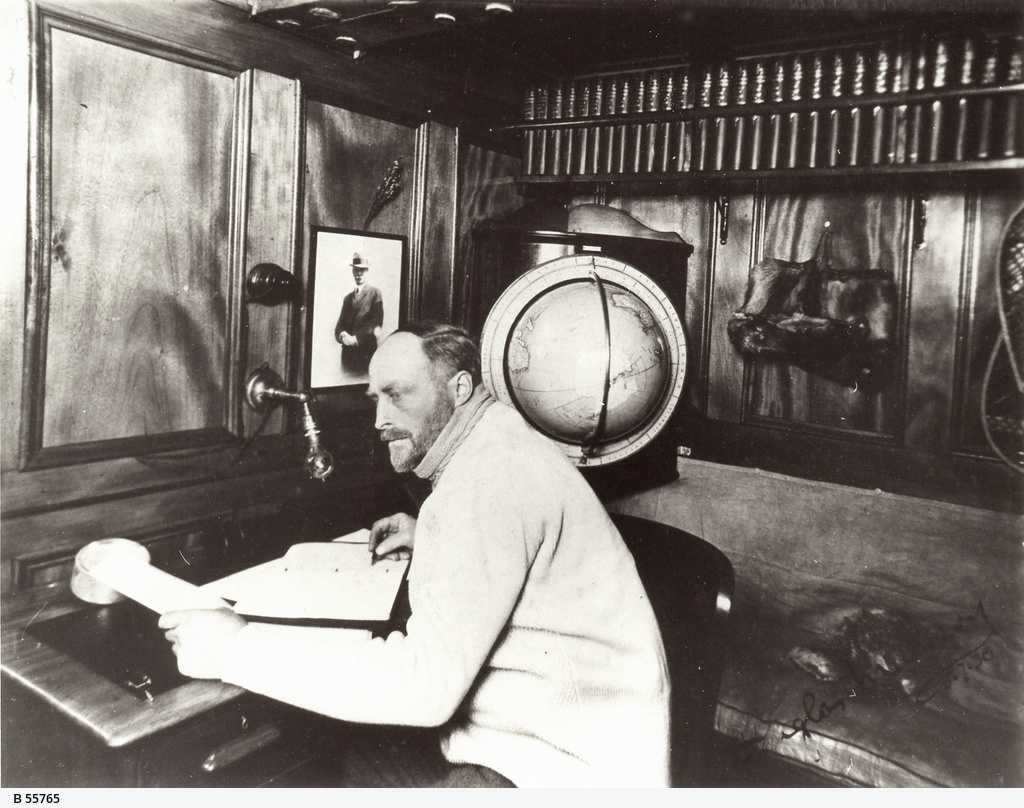
Sir Douglas Mawson in his cabin on board RRS Discovery, 1929

The British Australian (and) New Zealand Antarctic Research Expedition (BANZARE) was a research expedition into Antarctica between 1929 and 1931, involving two voyages over consecutive Austral summers. The expedition was led by Australian geologist Sir Douglas Mawson.

== Background ==
In 1927, the Australian National Research Council established an Antarctic Committee, which included Australian geologist Sir Douglas Mawson, with a view to staking territorial claims on the Antarctic continent. Mawson was the driving force behind the British Australian (and) New Zealand Antarctic Research Expedition (BANZARE), which was funded by the United Kingdom, Australia, and New Zealand, along with private backers such as Melbourne entrepreneur and philanthropist MacPherson Robertson.

At the time, there were Norwegian whalers working in the area, whose crew also made some territorial claims. The British Government wished to establish sovereignty over Antartica, partly in order to conserve whales in order to protect the whaling industry and, partly because of the strategic importance of the continent and Southern Ocean. This aim could only be achieved by sending an officer to claim land on behalf of the Commonwealth.

Mawson was appointed leader of the expedition, with his former captain John King Davis as captain of the research vessel RRS Discovery (the ship previously used by Robert Falcon Scott, lent by the British Government), and second in charge of expedition.

== Exploration ==
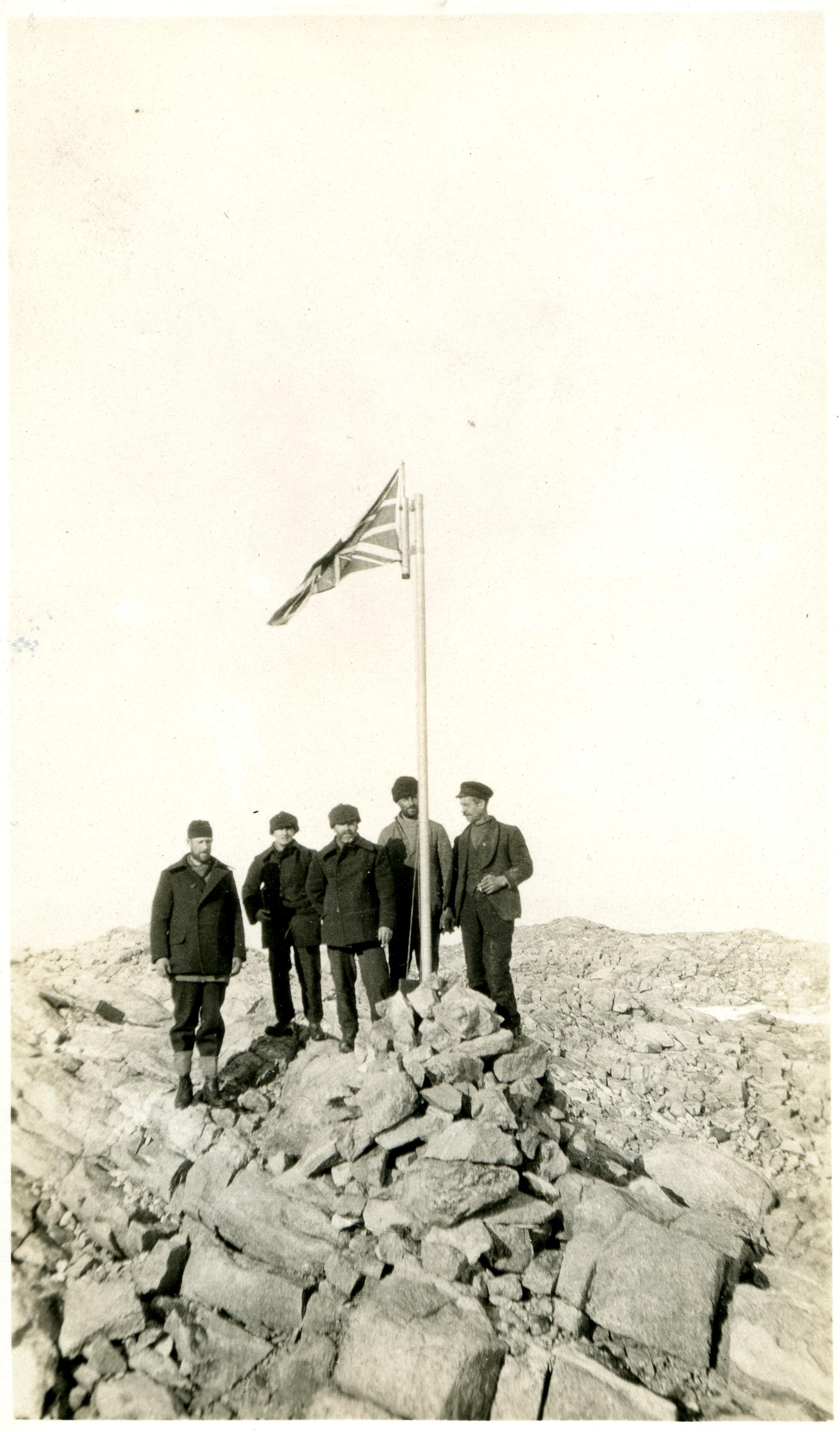
Claiming of Adélie Land for the British, Monday, 1200, 5 January 1931

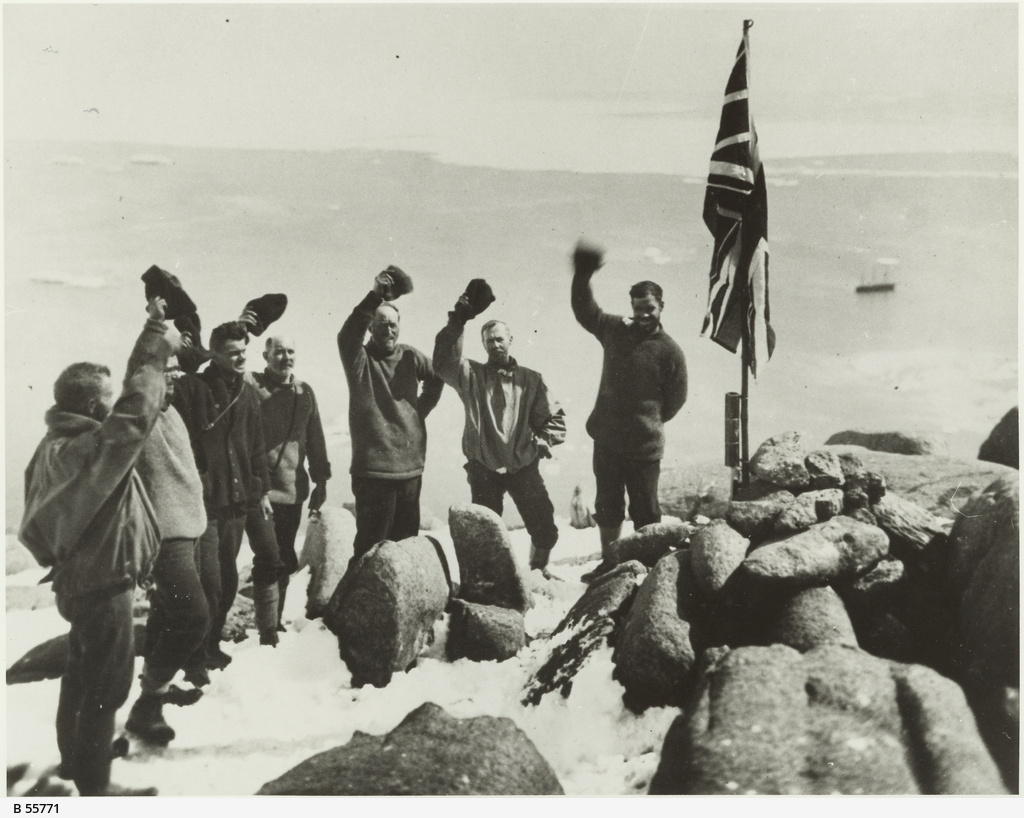
At Proclamation Rock, 1200, Monday 13 January 1930 (Note: From Eric Douglas's log "...8am In clear water now about 1/4 mile off this rock which appears about 700 ft high. 9am A party left in the motor boat (ten of them) their main job being to hoist the flag. At 12 noon we saw them on top of this rock and observed the flag was hoisted. Stu and I spent the morning working on our machine (aeroplane)...The party returned at 3pm with specimens of rock, penguins, birds etc".)

The voyages, which took place between 1929 and 1931 over consecutive Austral summers, primarily comprised an "acquisitive exploratory expedition". The brief of the expedition was to chart the coastline and its offshore features such as islands, rocks, and shoals between Queen Mary Land and Enderby Island; and to "plant the British Flag wherever you find it practicable to do so".

The focus in the first summer was on oceanography, Antarctic and subantarctic marine biology, and Antarctic coastal exploration west of the Shackleton Ice Shelf. During the second summer, further oceanographical work was carried out, and this time a party was able to land at Commonwealth Bay, and Mawson claimed possession of King George V Land, between 142° and 160°E.

BANZARE made three new landings, and short flights in a small plane discovered the Banzare Coast and Princess Elizabeth Land. The expedition mapped the Antarctic coastline from 45°E to 160°E, and defined the limits of what was to become later proclaimed as the Australian Antarctic Territory. The expedition also discovered Mac. Robertson Land.

Mawson made proclamations of British sovereignty over Antarctic lands at each of their five landfalls—on the understanding that the territory would later be handed to Australia (as it was in 1933). One such proclamation was made on 5 January 1931 at Cape Denison, the site which Mawson's Australasian Antarctic Expedition had occupied in 1912–13. A handwritten copy of the proclamation was left at the site, enclosed in a container made of food tins and buried beneath a cairn. The letter was retrieved in 1977 by an Australian Antarctic expedition, and became part of the Sir Douglas Mawson Collection at the National Museum of Australia.

The BANZARE was also a scientific quest, producing 13 volumes of reports, on geology, oceanography, meteorology, terrestrial magnetism, zoology, and botany, between 1937 and 1975.

== Personnel ==
Mawson led the expedition. Other staff through the first summer, 1929–30, were:

- T. Harvey Johnston – Senior biologist
- W.W. Ingram – Medical officer
- Harold Fletcher – Assistant zoologist
- Robert A. Falla – Ornithologist
- A. Howard (Australia) – Hydrologist
- Stuart Campbell (Australia) – Aviator
- Eric Douglas (Australia) – Aviator
- Ritchie Gibson Simmers – Meteorologist
- J.W.S. Marr – Hydrological and plankton specialist
- Frank Hurley (Australia) – Photographer and cinematographer
- Morton Moyes (Australia) – Cartographer

The crew of RRS Discovery in 1929–30 were:

- Captain John King Davis – Captain and Second in charge of expedition
- K.N. MacKenzie – First officer
- W.R. Colbeck – Second officer
- J.B. Child – Third officer
- W.J. Griggs – Chief engineer
- B.F. Welch – Second engineer
- Arthur J. Williams – Wireless officer (or petty officer)

During the second summer in 1930–31, magnetician A.L. Kennedy joined the group, and cartographer C. Oom, of the Royal Australian Navy, replaced Morton Moyes. The ship's crew had two changes: K.N. Mackenzie became Captain and Second in charge of expedition, and Max Stanton was First officer.

Petty officers included:

- Both voyages:
  - James H. Martin
  - John J. Miller
  - Allan J. Bartlett
- 1929–30 only:
  - C. Degerfeldt
  - Frank G. Dungay
  - Frederic Soncs
  - W. Simpson
  - Harry V. Gage
  - Clarence H. Sellwood
- 1929–30 only:
  - Ernest Bond
  - Josiah J. Pill
  - John E. Reed
  - George J. Rhodes
  - Joseph Williams

== Impact ==
The expedition was highly successful scientifically, producing large amounts of data about the Southern Ocean, increasing the knowledge base created by the Challenger expedition of 1872–1876. The research done by the scientists also showed the existence an undersea land platform, indicating that Antarctica was a continent rather than a series of islands. The expedition brought back a large number of samples for further analysis.

It also turned out very well for Australia; the land that Mawson had claimed for Britain (42 per cent of the continent) was transferred to Australia in 1935. The Australian Antarctic Acceptance Act was enacted in 1933, becoming law in 1936. This established the Australian Antarctic Territory from 45°E around to 160°E, with the exception of a narrow strip of French Antarctic Territory excepted.

== Films ==
Two films about BANZARE, the silent film Southward Ho with Mawson (1930) and the talkie Siege of the South (1931), both made by Frank Hurley using footage filmed by him on the expeditions, were released in cinemas as official recordings of the voyages. Takings from the film contributed to defray the costs of the expedition, and schoolchildren's attendance contributed significantly to the takings.

== See also ==
- List of Antarctic expeditions
