= Dr. Mawson in the Antarctic =

1913 Australian documentary film by Frank Hurley

Dr. Mawson in the Antarctic, known by many other titles, including in Australia as Home of the Blizzard, and released on the UK as Life in the Antarctic, is a collection of silent documentary footage of the Australasian Antarctic Expedition (AAE). The AAE was a 1911–1914 expedition to Antarctica led by Australian geologist and explorer Douglas Mawson, which was photographed with both still camera and cinematograph by one of the expedition members who was also the official photographer, Frank Hurley. The moving picture footage was released in varying versions, sometimes along with stills, with its first iterations in Australia, released in 1912 and 1913, titled With Mawson in the South. Direction of the film has been ascribed to Hurley, but the history of the film indicates otherwise; it was likely that he was only the cinematographer.

== Synopsis ==
The film(s) consist of a collection of photographs and moving pictures shot by Frank Hurley, a photographer who joined the Australasian Antarctic Expedition, which was led by Sir Douglas Mawson and travelled on SY Aurora to Antarctica in 1911. Hurley returned in early 1913, but Mawson's return was delayed until 1914. (Note: Note other information that throws doubt on all of the content was actually filmed by Hurley.)

== Titles and provenance ==
The film's provenance is complicated and bits were released under different titles over time. It is usually known in Australia as Home of the Blizzard, and Hurley himself referred to the film as Home of the Blizzard in a 1940 interview. This title refers to the AAE's main base camp was at Cape Denison in Adélie Land, and which Mawson took as the title of his 1915 book (The Home of the Blizzard).

The film was released in the UK as Life in the Antarctic.

The footage held by the Australian National Film and Sound Archive has three reels catalogued as Home of the Blizzard; four reels of different footage, catalogued under the title The Mawson–Antarctic Expedition, 1911–1913, Version 1; two 16mm reels as The Mawson Australasian Antarctic Expedition 1911–1913, Version 2; and one titled The Mawson Australasian Antarctic Expedition 1911–1913 [Offcuts]. However, none of the footage from the preserved version of Home of the Blizzard exists as a complete released feature, and there is some repetition in the other reels. None have either head or tail credits. So its provenance is obscure, as is its release history.

Chief cinema programmer at the NFSA, Quentin Turnour, writes that "At some point in its history, an electronic title was added at the tape's head: "Home of the Blizzard: Frank Hurley, 1913"; however, there are no primary sources supporting the name or date, and there is no evidence that Hurley directed the film. "Despite this, they have been critical in creating the received history of the canonical 1913-released film Home of the Blizzard". Some of the factoids have been promulgated by Hurley's biographers and by the 2002 TV miniseries about Ernest Shackleton, written and directed by Charles Sturridge, titled Shackleton. Turnour goes on to point out discrepancies in the footage of the film titled Home of the Blizzard (including that not all of it relates to the trip taken by Hurley; March 1913 footage is used to illustrate the December 1911 departure), concluding that the final footage of the film released in 1913 was likely to have been shaped by someone employed by Gaumont. Douglas Mawson signed an agreement with Gaumont on 17 March 1914 about Australian distribution of the film.

The history of the various reels of film decades later is complicated, with at least some of those currently in the NFSA having come from Mawson himself; his collection was forwarded to the National Library of Australia in May 1960 after extensive correspondence. In 1961, 16mm prints were made of some reels by the Commonwealth Film Unit, but the 35mm ones were retained.

== Production ==
The expedition left Hobart, Tasmania, in December 1911. Hurley returned in 1913, while as a result of two expedition members dying on the return journey to base of Mawson's Far Eastern Party, Mawson missed the returning ship and only returned in January 1914. Hurley shot film and photographs across their three bases in the Antarctic. Photographs and films were used both as a means of scientific documentation on such expeditions, and to raise funds by inviting the public to view the moving pictures.

=== Talkie version ===
In June 1931, it was reported that a new version of With Mawson in the South was being made by the Bondi Junction Studios owned by Union Theatres. An earlier report (May 1931), reported the title as With Mawson in the Frozen South.

== Release ==
Footage released in 1912 and 1913 was usually titled With Mawson in the South, sometimes accompanied by a lecture on the region. It was also sometimes titled With Dr. Mawson in the Antarctic in 1912 and 1913.

After Hurley's return to Australia in early 1913, the AAE footage was edited and premiered as a feature film in Melbourne at West's Picture Palace on Saturday 19 July 1913 (not in Sydney, as is often stated). After screening to large audiences in Sydney and elsewhere, enough money was raised for SY Aurora to head back to Cape Denison the following summer to collect Mawson.

Mawson himself referred to the footage as "the AAE film". Other titles used with the 1913 release were The Mawson Antarctic Expedition, Life in the Antarctic, The Mawson Pictures, and Dr Mawson's Antarctic Film Series, but no newspaper review indicated a specific title. Film historians have expressed scepticism about the title Home of the Blizzard, and it has never been released in Australia under that title.

The film was released in the UK as Life in the Antarctic.

Release dates recorded by the NFSA (versions unclear) are as follows:

- May–July 1912, Australia
- July–August 1913, Australia
- August–September 1914, Australia
- October 1914–1915, North America
- May 1915, London
- 1916–? in distribution, North America
- 1919–?

== Reception and impact ==
The film was successful in England and led to Ernest Shackleton hiring Hurley on his Imperial Trans-Antarctic Expedition between 1914 and 1916. In the Grip of the Polar Pack Ice, a documentary about Shackleton's expedition, was released in London in 1919. In 1996 the silent version was restored as a standalone film titled South: Sir Ernest Shackleton's Glorious Epic of the Antarctic.

== Legacy ==
Chief cinema programmer at the NFSA, Quentin Turnour, wrote that the film was the "primary documentation of the expedition and of first contact with Antarctica's natural history... also an artefact of Edwardian popular culture and of the history of moving image preservation in Australia... [and also] celebrated as a classic of Australian national cinema".

Turnour also suggests that some of the scenes in George Miller's 2006 animated film Happy Feet may be seen as paying homage to some "iconic cinematic moments" in Hurley's film.
