= Transportation in Hawaii =

Overview
- Transit type: Rapid transit, commuter rail, buses, private automobile, Taxicab, bicycle, pedestrian

Operation
- Operator: Hawaii Department of Transportation

The transportation system of Hawaiʻi is a complex system of infrastructure. The state is highly car-dependent, but has begun to invest in new bike and pedestrian paths. The settlement of youth climate case Navahine v. Hawaii Department of Transportation stipulates that the Hawaii Department of Transportation (HDOT) work to reduce vehicle miles traveled (VMT), invest more heavily in transit, and complete construction of bike, pedestrian, and transit infrastructure within a five-year period. Honolulu opened its Skyline light rail system in 2023 and is actively working on the next phase of the project.

== Transit systems ==
=== Rail ===
At one time, Hawaiʻi had a network of railroads (Hawaiian: alahao) on each of the larger islands that helped move farm commodities as well as passengers; these were incentivized by the Act to Promote the Construction of Railways (He Kānāwai e Kōkua ai i ka Hana ana i Nā Alanui Kaʻa Māhu) following the Reciprocity Treaty of 1875. The railroads were for the majority 3 ft (914 mm) narrow gauge, although there were some 2 ft 6 in (762 mm) gauge tracks on some of the smaller islands as well as the Hawaii Consolidated Railway (HCR), which operated in standard 4 ft 8 1/2 in (1,435 mm) gauge. One famous line was the one taken by the Lanakila ("Victory") train built under the directions of Benjamin Franklin Dillingham connecting Kūwili in downtown Honolulu to Mānana; this train was ridden by Liliʻuokalani which was further immortalized in a mele hula. The largest by far was the Oahu Railway and Land Company (OR&L) which ran multiple lines from Honolulu across the western and northern part of Oʻahu. The OR&L was an important player moving troops and goods during World War II. Traffic on this line was busy enough that there were signals on the lines facilitating movement of trains and wigwag signals at some railroad crossings for the protection of motorists. The mainline was officially abandoned in 1947, although part of it was bought by the US Navy and operated until 1970. One hundred and thirty miles (210 km) of track remain and preservationists occasionally run trains over a portion of this line.

Honolulu sought to initiate a rail transit system as early as the 1960s. By the mid-2000s, studies had finally been conducted and a light metro line was planned for the city's western suburbs. Construction started in 2011 and was set back by various delays until Skyline opened to service in 2023.

=== Bus ===
Each major island has a public bus system. TheBus system services Oʻahu, Hele-On services Hawaiʻi Island and County, Maui Bus services Maui and The Kauai Bus services Kauaʻi County.

== Roads and freeways ==
A system of state highways encircles each main island. Only Oʻahu has federal highways and is the only area outside the contiguous 48 states to have signed Interstate highways. Travel can be slow due to narrow, winding roads and congestion in cities.

=== Bridges and tunnels ===
- Admiral Clarey Bridge, also known as the Ford Island Bridge, is a floating concrete drawbridge providing access to Ford Island, a United States Navy installation situated in the middle of Pearl Harbor. The causeway bridge was completed and opened in 1998, named the Admiral Clarey Bridge after former Admiral Bernard A. Clarey. The bridge has a total length of 4,700 ft (1,400 m), including a 930 ft (280 m) pontoon section that can be retracted to allow water traffic to pass through.
- Hospital Rock Tunnels are a small pair of highway tunnels passing through a ridge on the edge of the Ko‘olau Range on the island of O‘ahu, Hawaiʻi, USA. The tunnels are located on Interstate H-3, which connects Kaneohe with Interstate H-1 at Hālawa near Pearl Harbor, and are 354 feet (108 m) long Kaneohe bound and 353 feet (108 m) long Halawa bound. The tunnels are "cut and cover" tunnels.
- John H. Wilson Tunnels are a pair of highway tunnels passing through the Ko‘olau Range on the island of O‘ahu. The tunnels are located on Likelike Highway (Route 63), which connects Kāneʻohe with Honolulu, and are 2,775 feet (846 m) long westbound and 2,813 feet (857 m) long eastbound.
- Nu‘uanu Pali Tunnels are a set of four highway tunnels (two in each direction) on the Pali Highway (Hawaii State Highway 61) which pass through the Nuʻuanu Pali. These tunnels serve as one of three trans Koʻolau routes between Honolulu (leeward Oʻahu) and the communities of windward Oʻahu.

Also, the Nuʻuanu Pali Tunnels serve as a major transportation route from Kaneohe & Kailua over to Honolulu.

- Tetsuo Harano Tunnels are a pair of highway tunnels passing through the Ko‘olau Range on the island of O‘ahu. The tunnels are located on Interstate H-3, which connects Kaneohe with Interstate H-1 at Hālawa near Pearl Harbor, and are 4,980 feet (1,520 m) long Kaneohe bound and 5,165 feet (1,574 m) long Halawa bound.

=== Ferries ===
Private steamships and ferries were the sole way of traveling between the islands from the 19th century until the 1950s. Seaflite operated hydrofoils between the major islands between 1975 and 1978. The Hawaii Superferry operated between Oʻahu and Maui between December 2007 and March 2009, with additional routes planned for other islands. Legal issues over environmental impact statements and protests ended the service, though the company operating Superferry has expressed a wish to begin ferry service again at a future date. Currently there is passenger ferry service in Maui County between Molokaʻi and Maui, and between Lanaʻi and Maui, though neither of these takes vehicles. Norwegian Cruise Lines also provides passenger cruise ship service between the islands.

== Pedestrian and bicycle infrastructure ==
The State of Hawaii Department of Transportation (HDOT) maintains a comprehensive pedestrian master plan as well as a pedestrian “toolbox.” The toolbox is a document that lays out best practices for streets to incorporate pedestrian accessibility, mobility, and safety.

Similarly, HDOT generates a state bike plan, Bike Plan Hawai'i, every few decades. HDOT released the first such plan released in 1977 with subsequently refreshed plans published in 1994, 2003, and 2022. On its website, HDOT maintains a map of current and planned bikeways around the state.

After over 100 traffic-related fatalities across the state in 2022, the Hawaii State Legislature passed Safe Routes to School legislation in 2023 with the goal of promoting pedestrian safety, improving sidewalks, and encouraging non-motorized transportation.

== Airports ==
Honolulu International Airport is the major commercial aviation hub of Hawaiʻi, with intercontinental services to North America, Asia and Oceania. Within Hawaiʻi, Hawaiian Airlines, Mokulele Airlines and Go! use jets between the larger airports in Honolulu, Līhuʻe, Kahului, Kona and Hilo, while Island Air and Pacific Wings serve smaller airports. These airlines also provide air freight service between the islands.

== See also ==
- Aviation in Hawaii
- Plug-in electric vehicles in Hawaii
