= Ford Island (disambiguation) =

Ford Island is an island in the middle of Pearl Harbor, Hawaii.

Ford Island may also refer to:

- Ford Island (Windmill Islands), a small rocky island off the eastern coast of Antarctica
- Ford Island or Powers Island, an island of the Midwest in Michigan
