= Wright Point =

Northernmost point of Ford Island, Windmill Islands

Wright Point (66°24′S 110°30′E) is the northernmost point of Ford Island in the Windmill Islands. First mapped from air photos taken by U.S. Navy Operation Highjump and Operation Windmill in 1947 and 1948. Named by the Advisory Committee on Antarctic Names (US-ACAN) for Commissaryman Robert D. Wright, U.S. Navy, a member of the Wilkes Station party of 1958.
