= Cloyd Island =

Island in Antarctica

- Location within Antarctica

Geography
- Location: Antarctica
- Coordinates: 66°25′S 110°33′E
- Archipelago: Windmill Islands
- Length: 1.1 km (0.68 mi)

Administration
- Administered under the Antarctic Treaty System

Demographics
- Population: Uninhabited

Cloyd Island is a rocky Antarctic island, 1.1 km (0.6 nmi) long, between Ford and Herring Islands in the south part of the Windmill Islands off the Budd Coast. It was first mapped from aerial photographs taken by USN Operation Highjump and Operation Windmill, 1947–1948. Named by the US-ACAN for J. R. Cloyd, Army Transport Service observer with Operation Windmill which established astronomical control stations in the area in January 1948.

== See also ==
- Composite Antarctic Gazetteer
- List of Antarctic and sub-Antarctic islands
- List of Antarctic islands south of 60° S
- SCAR
- Territorial claims in Antarctica
