= Herring Island =

Island in Antarctica

- Location within Antarctica

Geography
- Location: Antarctica
- Coordinates: 66°24′S 110°38′E
- Archipelago: Windmill Islands
- Length: 3.7 km (2.3 mi)

Administration
- Administered under the Antarctic Treaty System

Demographics
- Population: Uninhabited

Herring Island is an Antarctic rocky island, 3.7 km (2 nmi) long, lying 1.9 km (1 nmi) east of Cloyd Island in the south part of the Windmill Islands. It was first mapped from air photos taken by USN Operation Highjump and Operation Windmill in 1947 and 1948. Named by the US-ACAN for Lt. Charles C. Herring, USN, photographic officer with Operation Windmill parties which obtained air and ground photos of the area in January 1948.

== Foster Bluff ==
Foster Bluff is a conspicuous rock bluff surmounting the shore in the southwest part of the island. It was named by the US-ACAN for Danny L. Foster, meteorologist and also a member of the Wilkes Station party of 1962.

== See also ==
- Composite Antarctic Gazetteer
- List of Antarctic and sub-Antarctic islands
- List of Antarctic islands south of 60° S
- SCAR
- Territorial claims in Antarctica
