= Niles Island =

Island in Antarctica

Niles Island (66°26′S 110°24′E) is a rocky island, 0.2 nautical miles (0.4 km) long, lying close off the south end of Holl Island in the Windmill Islands. First mapped from air photos taken by U.S. Navy Operation Highjump and Operation Windmill in 1947 and 1948. Named by the Advisory Committee on Antarctic Names (US-ACAN) for G.W. Niles, a member of the U.S. Navy Operation Highjump and U.S. Navy Operation Windmill photographic units which photographed the area in February 1947 and January 1948, respectively.

== See also ==
- List of antarctic and sub-antarctic islands
