= Seth Porter Ford =

American physician

Seth Porter Ford (October 12, 1817 – November 19, 1866) was an American medical doctor in the Kingdom of Hawaii.

== Life ==
Seth Porter Ford was born on October 12, 1817 in Washington, Connecticut. His father was John Mansfield Ford (1785–1843) and mother was Polly Ann Calhoun (1796–1864). He studied medicine from 1846 to 1847 at Yale University and published a book on inflammation there.

Ford married Maria N. Fowler, the daughter of medical doctor Remus M. Fowler, on January 1, 1850. The couple moved to Honolulu in 1852 from Boston. After trying to open two hospitals that were financial failures, his first wife returned to the US and he filed for divorce. He was a founding member of the Hawaiian Medical Association in 1856.

He married Carolina (Carrie) Jackson in 1858. They had a daughter Lois Carrie Ford, who married first cousin Porter Dwight Ford in 1883. Seth Porter Ford became a member of the Honolulu Rifles in 1864. Ford died on November 19, 1866.

Jackson had just assumed ownership of a small island in Pearl Harbor known as Moku ʻumeʻume in the Hawaiian language. It was then known as Ford Island, and became the home of the Naval Auxiliary Landing Field Ford Island.
