= Aviation in Hawaii =

- Aviation in the United States
- Hawaii State Flag

Airports
- Commercial – primary: 7
- Commercial – non-primary: 1
- General aviation: 6
- Military and other airports: 7

First flight
- 2 March 1889 (Lighter than air), December 1910 (Heavier than air)

Hawaii's first aeronautical event was on 2 March 1889, when Emil L. Melville hung from a trapeze in a balloon. Hawaii's first aircraft flight was on 31 December 1910 by a Curtiss Biplane.

== Events ==
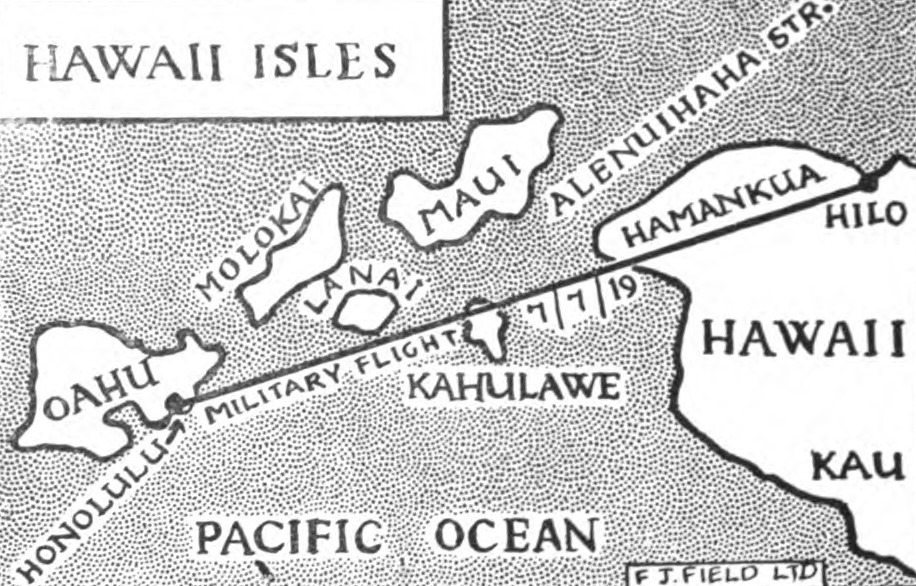
- Aviation in Hawaii in 1925
  1913 1st Lt. Harold Geiger operates a Curtiss Model E, and a Curtiss SC out of Fort Kamehameha.
- 1925 John Rodgers leads a non-stop flight attempt from California to Hawaii in a Naval Aircraft Factory PN.
- 1927 January - Lewis Hawaiian Tours starts flights between islands in a five-seat Ryan modified from a swept-wing standard.
- 1927 The Dole Air Derby challenged aviators to fly from Oakland, California to Honolulu. Only two aircraft completed the trip out of a field of eight.
- 1931 July 26, Lieut John C. Crain establishes a world glider endurance record of 16 hrs 38 minutes aided by searchlights, landing at Kaneohe Bay.
- 1941 On 7 December, the attack on Pearl Harbor initiated America's declaration of war with Japan.
- 1949 January - Bill Odom flies a Beechcraft Bonanza nonstop from Waikiki to the Continental U.S. In March, the same plane is flown 5273 miles from Waikiki to Teterboro, New Jersey.
- 1950 On 3 January Pan American Airways completes the first commercial non-stop flight from Tokyo to Honolulu.

== Aerospace ==
The Hawaiian Islands are home to scientific research into astronomy, robotics and aerospace technology. Hawai'i is home to some of the world's largest telescopes and the observatory located near the summit of Mauna Kea, the Big Island. The composition of the volcanic sand on the mountains of Hawaii has nearly the same chemical composition as the Moon. This allows for lunar missions to be tested on Earth first, before leaving the atmosphere. Hawaii is also home to U.S. astronaut Ellison Onizuka and the Astronaut Ellison S. Onizuka Space Center. At the ʻImiloa Astronomy Center is a museum dedicated to exploring and developing the link between Polynesian explorers and space exploration. NASA has announced a lunar research park in Hilo. The University of Hawaii has provided volunteers for these missions in the past through PISCES. The University of Hawaii has held student design competitions for models for space colonization.

== Airports ==
- Honolulu International Airport (HNL) serves over 10 million passengers per year.
- List of airports in Hawaii

== Commercial service ==
Hawaiian Airlines is the largest locally operated airline. The airline started service on 6 October 1929 as Inter-Island Airways with a Bellanca CH-300 Pacemaker. Go! Mokulele which is a joint venture between Mesa Airlines and Republic Airways Holdings provides inter-island service.

== Organizations ==
The General Aviation Council of Hawaii is headquartered in Honolulu, Hawaii.

== Government and military ==
All flight operations in Hawaii are conducted within FAA oversight. The Hawaii Air National Guard was activated in 1946. The Honolulu Police Department started air operations in 1970. It currently operates two MD520 NOTAR helicopters.

== Museums ==
- Pacific Aviation Museum Museum on Ford Island

== Gallery ==
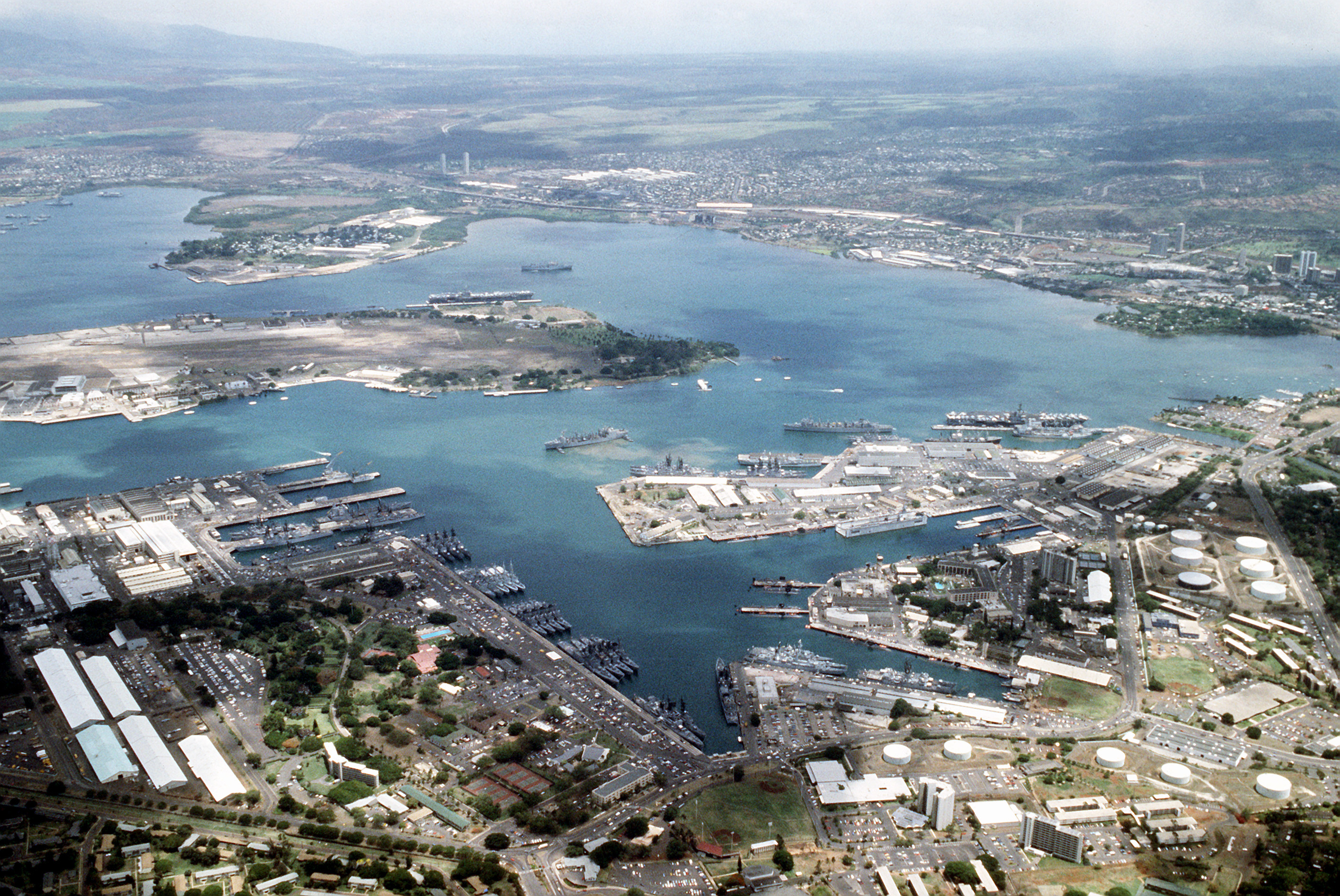
Pearl Harbor
