= Admiral Clarey Bridge =

Bridge connecting Ford Island to Oʻahu within Pearl Harbor

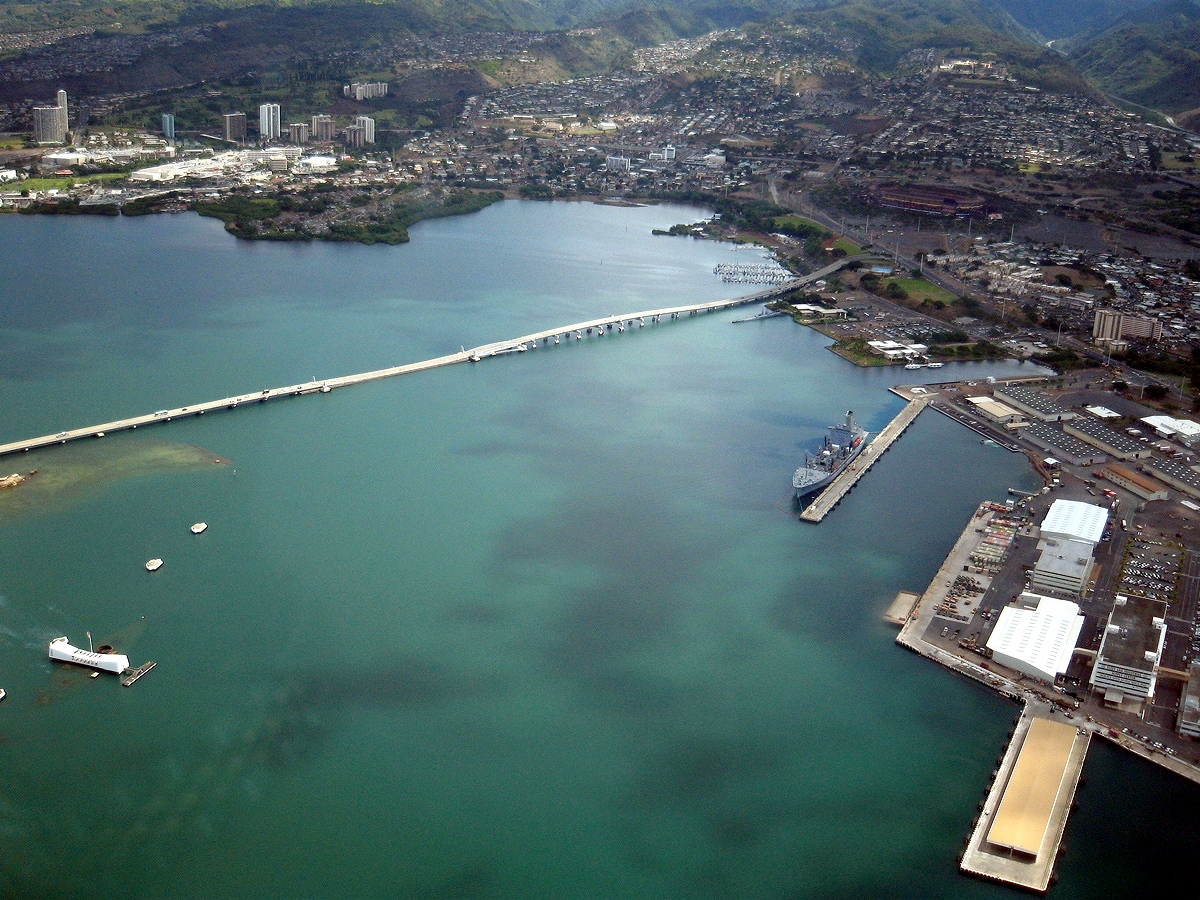
- Admiral Clarey Bridge with the USS Arizona Memorial, USS Bowfin, museums, naval yards, and Aloha Stadium visible
- Coordinates: 21.3691°N 157.9441°W
- Crosses: Pearl Harbor
- Locale: Aiea, Hawaii
- Official name: Admiral Bernard "Chick" Clarey Bridge
- Other name: Ford Island Road
- Maintained by: U.S. Navy
- ID number: 1HI0320

Characteristics
- Design: Pontoon bridge (Floating concrete drawbridge)
- Material: Concrete
- Total length: 4,672 ft (1,424 m)
- Width: 44 ft (13 m)
- No. of spans: 30

History
- Designer: Parsons Brinckerhoff Quade & Douglas, Inc
- Construction start: 10 January 1996
- Opened: 15 April 1998

Statistics
- Daily traffic: 5500

Location
- Interactive map of Admiral Clarey Bridge

Admiral Clarey Bridge, also known as the Ford Island Bridge, is a 4,672 ft (1,424 m) road bridge that connects Ford Island in Pearl Harbor to the mainland of Oahu, the third-largest island of Hawaii. A 930 ft (280 m) section of it is supported by pontoons, and can be moved to allow vessels to pass through. This floating moveable span is the largest in the world.

The bridge is used by military families housed on Ford Island and by tour buses serving the island's historic sites. The bridge replaced an hourly ferry service operated by the U.S. Navy. Its namesake, Admiral Bernard A. Clarey, was one of the Navy's most decorated officers.

== History ==
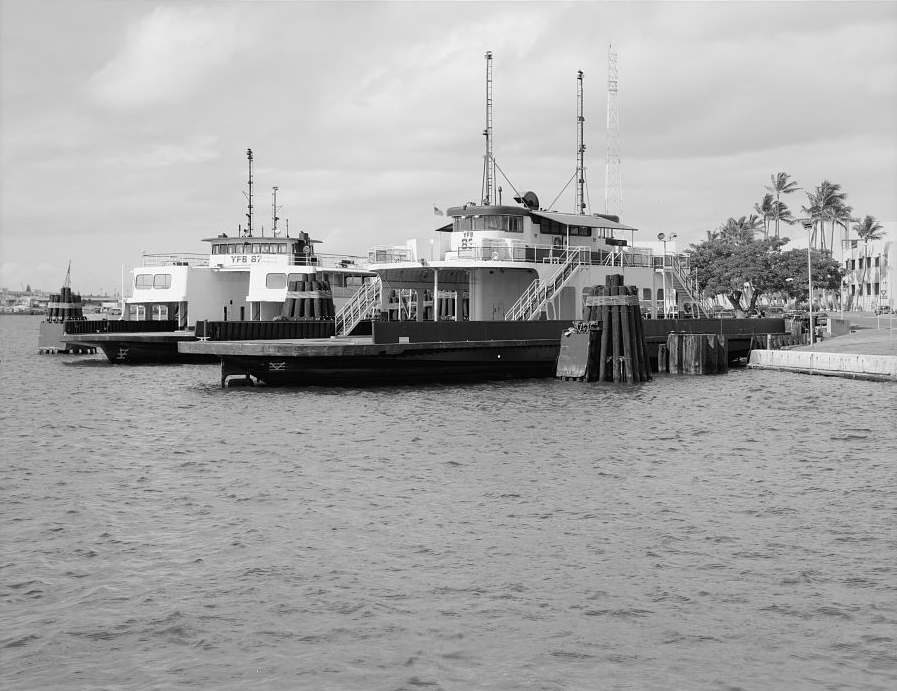
Ferryboats Moko Holo Hele (YFB-87, on left) and Waa Hele Honoa (YFB-83) provided access before the bridge was built.

Before the bridge was built, access to Ford island was restricted to U.S. military personnel, their dependents, and invited guests. Passage to the island was provided by ferryboats. For decades, two Navy diesel-powered ferries served the island: Waa Hele Honoa (YFB-83) and Moko Holo Hele (YFB-87). The Waa Hele Honoa, translated as "Canoe go to land", was purchased in 1959 for $274,000 and pressed into service by the Navy on 3 March 1961. The 181-foot ship could carry 750 people and 33 vehicles. The Moko Holo Hele, translated as "boat go back and forth", was purchased for $1.1 million on 25 May 1970. It is 162 feet long and can hold 750 people and 42 vehicles. Several smaller "foot ferries" carried pedestrians between Ford Island and several landings around Pearl Harbor.

=== Funding ===
Proposals to connect the island had been around since 1967, when a study suggested that there were only three ways to connect the island: a bridge, a tunnel, or a rubble-filled causeway. In 1976, the military construction budget included a proposal for a $25 million causeway but it was removed as too expensive. Other proposals such as a steel bridge were considered but were never constructed because of the cost.

A proposal finally came to fruition after Sen. Daniel Inouye introduced special legislation, 10 U.S.C. § 2814, to authorize the Navy to sell land to fund the bridge. The bridge was primarily funded through the "Manana deal," where the Navy sold 109 acres (44 ha) in Pearl City, called the Manana storage site, to the City and County of Honolulu for development for $94,000,000. The Navy was also able to lease and sell 34 acres (14 ha) of Ford Island as part of Inouye's renovation project to use private funds to redevelop the island.

=== Rebirth of Ford Island ===
Initially called "the bridge to nowhere", the Admiral Clarey bridge was instrumental in Inouye's "rebirth" of Ford Island and enabled over $500,000,000 in development on the island. It connected 45 families and 3,000 civilian workers to Kamehameha Highway. The completion of the bridge also enabled the Navy to further develop the island to include the $331,000,000 NOAA's Senator Daniel Inouye Pacific Tsunami Warning Center. In addition, visitor access to the island with the bridge enabled the construction of the $50,000,000 16-acre (6.5 ha) Pacific Aviation Museum.

It was designed by Parsons Brinckerhoff Quade & Douglas, Inc and constructed by the joint venture of Dillingham-Manson. Ground was broken on the causeway bridge on 10 January 1996 and was completed in 1998 and dedicated on 15 April of that year. The entire project cost $78,000,000 to complete. The design of the bridge earned the 1999 American Society of Civil Engineers Outstanding Projects and leaders award of merit and the United States Department of Transportation 2000 Honor Award for design excellence. The project was completed ahead of time and under budget.

Future plans for the bridge include a plan by the city of Honolulu to build a second bridge from Ford Island to 'Ewa Beach to reduce the stress on existing highways caused by high traffic and congestion. Currently, Interstate H-1 provides the only access from the west side of the island to Honolulu. The plan would include a public use or toll roadway that would come near the Navy's West Loch Naval Magazine, which stores ammunition for the military; a concern for the Navy. The Navy also expressed concerns about the infrastructure of Pearl Harbor and Ford Island's historical significance being affected by the project.

== Design ==
The bridge has a total length of 4,672 ft (1,424 m), including a 930 ft (280 m) pontoon section that can be retracted under the fixed bridge to allow the largest battleships and aircraft carriers to pass. The bridge consists of a 650 ft (200 m) wide channel as well as a 100 ft (30 m) wide 30 ft (9.1 m) high opening for smaller craft under an elevated span. The entry control point at the east end of the bridge provides room for two traffic lanes of entry, a single exit lane, and a guard tower with a turnaround.

=== Design–build ===
The project was developed using a design–build, operate and maintain (DBOM) approach. The Navy did an environmental impact study, studied various bridge alternatives, and settled on a combination fixed and floating bridge. The Navy then awarded contracts of $350,000 to three major contractors to create candidate designs for the bridge. On 19 August 1994, the Navy awarded a design-build contract to Dillingham-Manson, JV.

=== Construction ===
Some 350 to 400 24-inch prestressed concrete piles were built on site to support the bridge. The piles were driven at angles 137 ft (42 m) into the seabed. In 2001, three years after construction had completed, cracks were discovered in four pillars. Under a maintenance contract, the cracks were repaired with concrete sleeves at no cost to the Navy.

Most of the pre-cast girders and deck panels were constructed in Tacoma, Washington, and shipped by 300 ft (91 m) barge. The three concrete pontoons for the floating moveable span were also constructed in Tacoma by Concrete Technology Corporation in a graving dock and floated to Ford Island by barge in three shipments. They are 310 ft (94 m) long, 50 ft (15 m) wide, and 17 ft (5.2 m) tall, and are buoyed by 21 water-tight air-filled cells with leak detectors. The three sections were assembled at the site using large steel bolts.

Pontoon bridges, which rest on water, are designed to withstand stresses from nature as well as traffic. A similar bridge in Washington, the Hood Canal bridge, sank in 1979 after the pontoons flooded amid 80 mph (130 km/h) winds. Experience from the replacement for that bridge helped engineers better design the Admiral Clarey bridge's pontoons for wave load resistance. The Admiral Clarey bridge is designed to withstand winds as high as 100 mph (160 km/h) and waves as high as 5 ft (1.5 m).

=== Moveable span ===
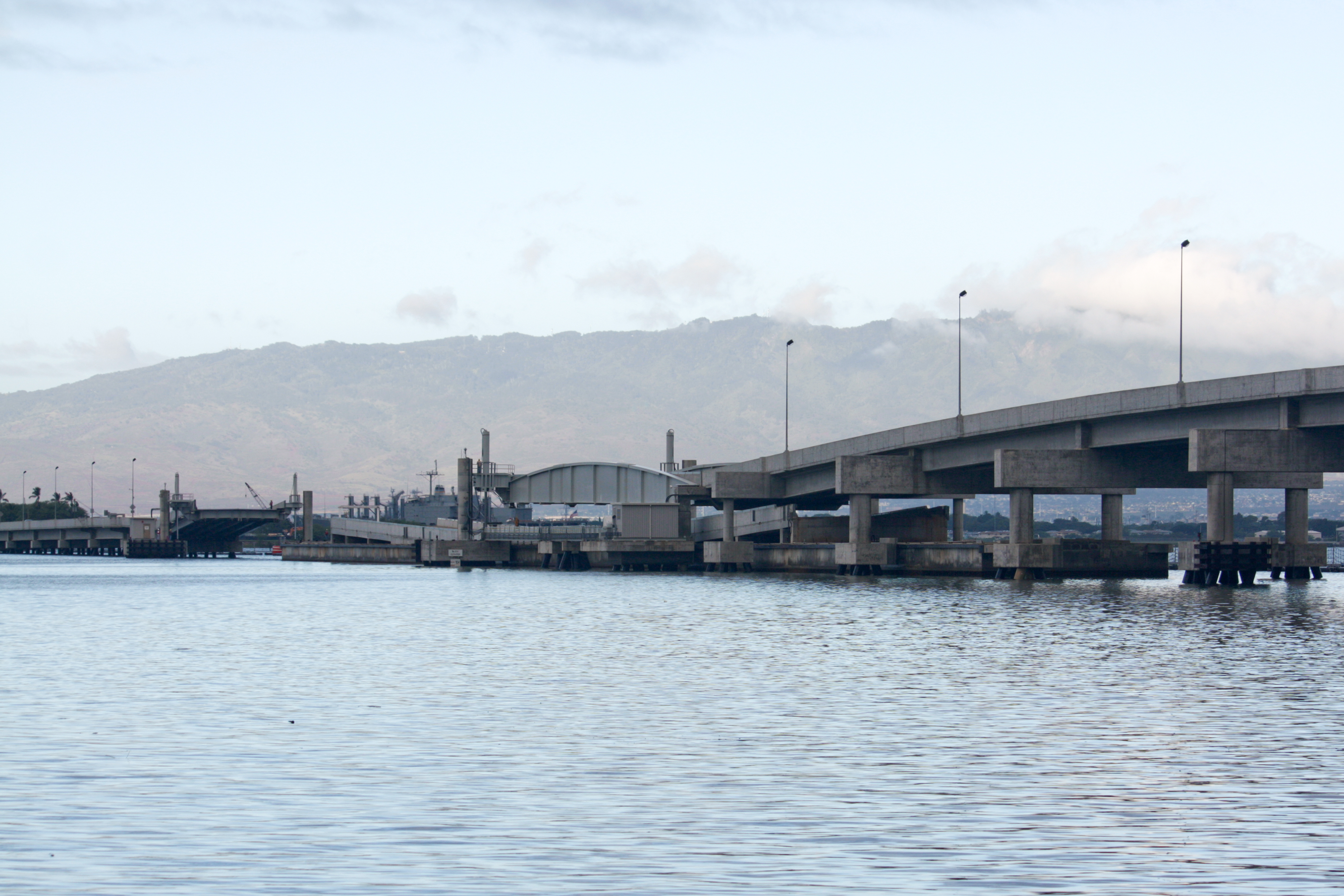
The Admiral Clarey Bridge with gateway open

The bridge was designed with a movable floating pontoon. Steel transition spans connect the two ends of the fixed bridge to the pontoon. Two hydraulic rams, located on either side of the transition spans, lift the transition spans off the pontoon allowing the pontoon to retract under the fixed bridge. The transition spans accommodate 1 ft (0.30 m) of tide movement and 4.6 ft (1.4 m) of pontoon movement. In addition, the spans sit on a central pivot that assists with the movement caused by waves. In the event that the transition spans are unable to bear the stress of movement of the pontoon, specifically in the case of seismic activity, the bridge has a breakaway feature that can be easily repaired.

The floating portion is then retracted under the O'ahu side of the fixed bridge at a rate of 14 inches per second to create a 650 ft navigation channel. The entire process takes 25 minutes to complete. Retraction of the movable span is accomplished by two hydraulic winches located on the control pier on the southeast side of the bridge. Two-inch steel cables are used to connect each winch to the pontoon: one is connected to the far and the other to the near end of the pontoon. The opening sequence consists of activating the warning lights and bells, lowering the warning gates and barriers, lifting the transition spans on both sides, and operating the winches. During the opening, the winch connected to the west end pulls while the winch on the east end pays out. As the span nears fully open, the winch speeds are slowed to allow the pontoon to stop without snapping a cable. This entire operation is operated from a control room on the east section of the bridge at the highest point and monitored from wireless cameras. 36 post-tensioned straddle bents span 60-ft under the elevated span to form a pocket for the movable span to rest while the bridge is open.

== Public reception ==
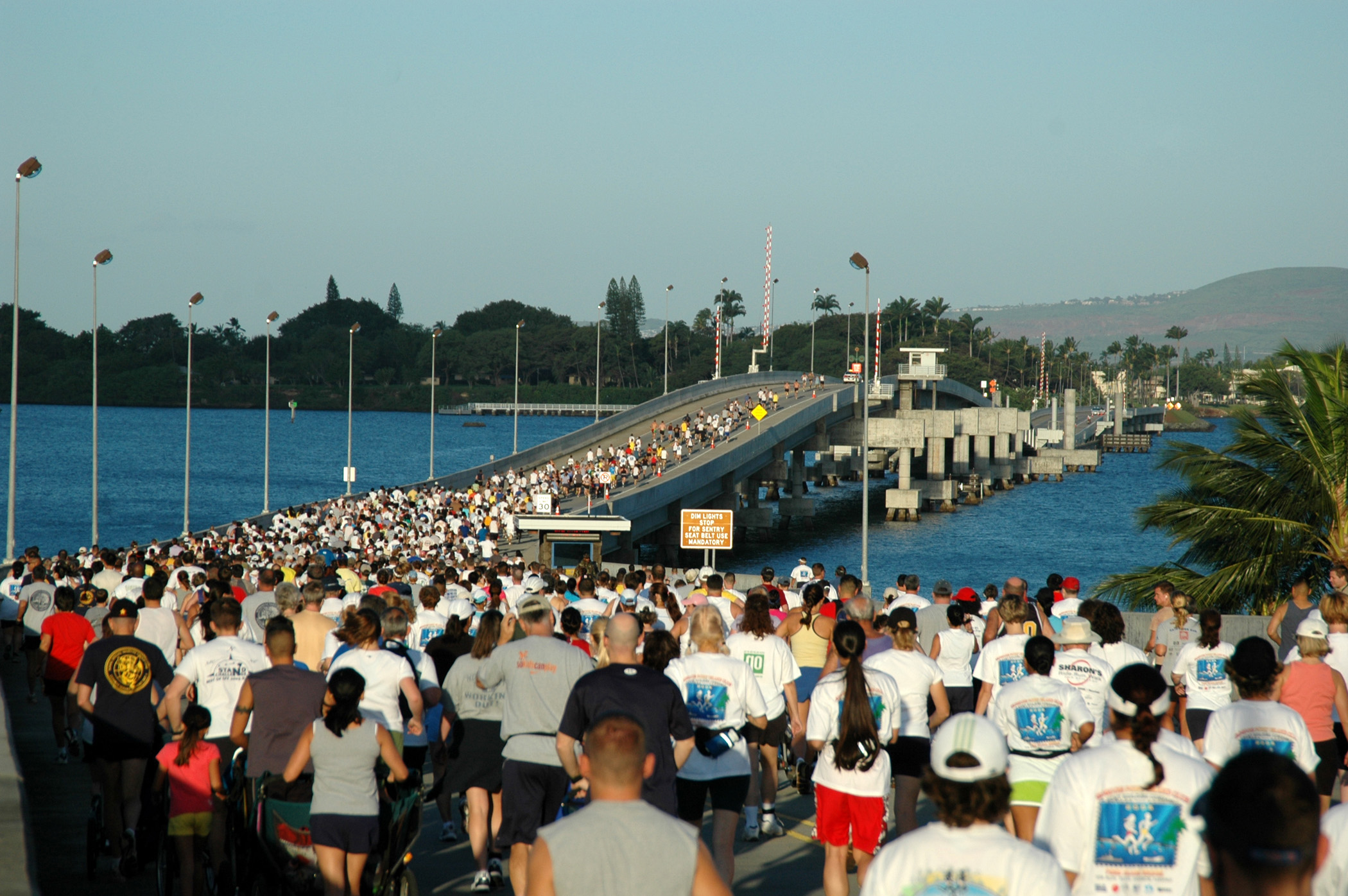
More than 1,400 military and civilian runners make their way across the Adm. Bernard "Chick" Clarey Bridge during the 2006 Ford Island 10k Bridge Run at Pearl Harbor.

Although access to the bridge is limited to those who hold a US military ID card, several events are hosted annually that are open to the public. The bridge is the location of the annual Ford Island 10K Bridge run which has been one of the largest runs in O'ahu. Starting in 2012, the Tripler Fisher House started its "Boots on the Bridge" event which honors fallen military members by placing boots with photos across Ford Island and the Admiral Clarey Bridge. More than 6,000 boots line the route to remember each fallen soldier since the September 11 terrorist attacks in New York City. In 2009, the American Cancer Society raised over $150,000 from 3,000 participating for breast cancer research through the Making Strides Against Breast Cancer walk over the bridge and in 2011 had over 8,000 participants and raised over $200,000.

National Park Service officials criticized the construction of the Admiral Clarey bridge fearing that by connecting road traffic to the mainland, the increased flow of island visitors would raise the level of theft of historical artifacts from the USS Arizona and other memorials on or around Ford Island.

The National Oceanic and Atmospheric Administration, which has a facility on Ford Island, criticized the US Navy's hurricane and tsunami disaster plans which calls for closing the bridge to traffic and opening the channel to allow all ships to vacate the harbor. The NOAA's concerns were that with the bridge outage, the tsunami warning center would not be able to operate effectively at a time when its need was greatest. The Navy's plan calls for the use of the tour boats to act as ferries whenever the bridge would be unavailable for long periods of time and offered them as a solution to the NOAA's concerns. However, an organization called Public Employees for Environmental Responsibility (PEER) believed that the boats would be unable to provide for a speedy evacuation in a tsunami. In the event of a storm, PEER also noted that if the Navy was so concerned that they would evacuate their largest ships, that the small ferries would be unable to operate in those storm conditions. If the ferries were unable to operate, NOAA employees could not rotate shifts with fresh staff to relieve stranded employees sheltering in place. The NOAA assured its employees that a tsunami affecting Ford Island was unlikely despite O'ahu being an area of high tsunami danger.

== Namesake ==
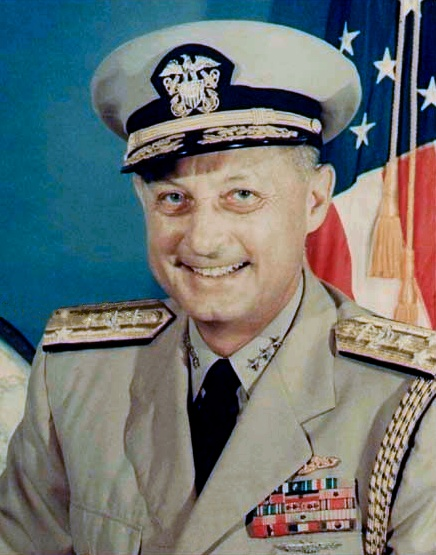
Admiral Bernard "Chick" Clarey

The Admiral Clarey bridge was named after United States Navy Admiral Bernard A. Clarey. Admiral Clarey served as Commander U.S. Second Fleet (COMSECONDFLT) and later was Commander U.S. Pacific Fleet. He was awarded three Navy Crosses for valor. Admiral Clarey was a survivor of the attack on Pearl Harbor while he was the executive officer of the submarine USS Dolphin (SS-169). After his service in the Navy, Clarey served as vice president for the Bank of Hawaii. He died at Tripler Army Medical Center in Hawaii on 15 June 1996.

== Memorials ==
The submarine Bowfin lies just south of the sentry tower. Visible from the Admiral Clarey bridge, also to the south but on the Ford Island side, are the USS Arizona Memorial and USS Missouri. While ferry boats still provide access to the USS Arizona memorial, the bridge is the only access to the Missouri tour, the USS Oklahoma memorial, the Pacific Aviation Museum Pearl Harbor, and USS Utah for the public via Roberts Hawaii tour bus.

The Navy Facilities Engineering Command required that the bridge be low-profile to prevent any visual degradation to the USS Arizona memorial and to maintain Ford Island's historical and cultural value.

== See also ==
- List of bridges in Hawaii
- Joint Base Pearl Harbor–Hickam
- Transportation in Hawaii
- Naval Auxiliary Landing Field Ford Island
