= Holl Island =

Island of Antarctica

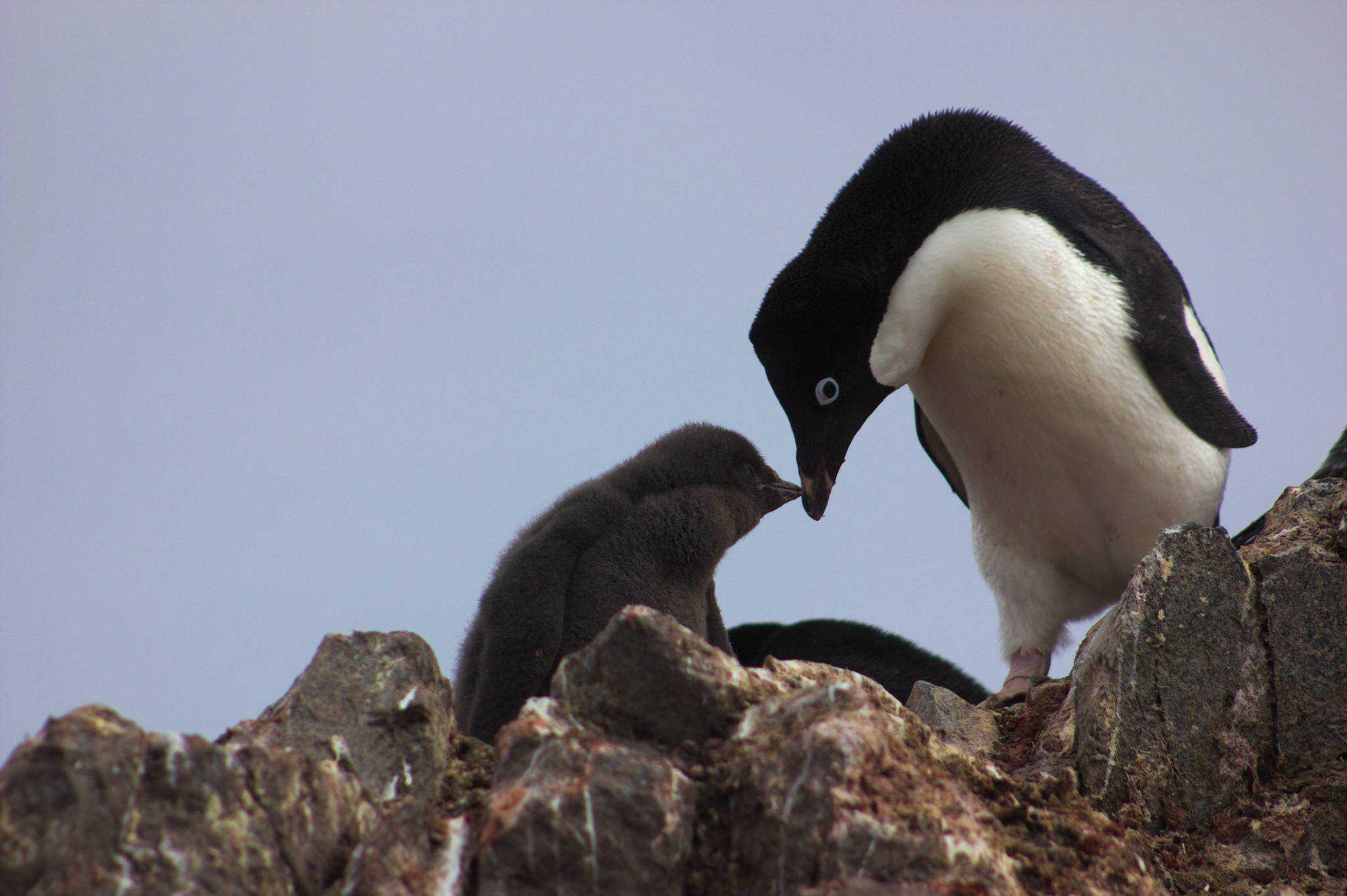
- Adélie penguins breed in the IBA

- Location within Antarctica

Geography
- Location: Wilkes Land, Antarctica
- Coordinates: 66°25′S 110°25′E
- Archipelago: Windmill Islands
- Length: 3.1 km (1.93 mi)
- Highest elevation: 90 m (300 ft)

Administration
- Administered under the Antarctic Treaty System

Demographics
- Population: Uninhabited

Holl Island is a rocky, triangular-shaped Antarctic island, 3.1 km (1.7 nmi) long, marking the south-western end of the Windmill Islands.

== Discovery and naming ==
The island was mapped from aerial photographs taken by USN Operation Highjump, 1946–1947, and USN Operation Windmill, 1947–1948. It was named by the US-ACAN for Lt. Richard C. Holl, USNR, photogrammetrist with the Navy Hydrographic Office, who served as surveyor with the Operation Windmill parties which established astronomical control stations on Holl Island and along Queen Mary and Knox Coasts. Churchill Point is the north-western point of the island; it was named by the US-ACAN for Radioman Robert W. Churchill, USN, a member of the Wilkes Station party of 1958.

== Important Bird Area ==
A 1,052 ha site comprising both Holl Island and neighbouring O'Connor Island has been designated an Important Bird Area (IBA) by BirdLife International because it supports about 30,000 breeding pairs of Adélie penguins, estimated from 2011 satellite imagery. Other birds recorded as breeding in the IBA include snow petrels, Cape petrels, south polar skuas, Wilson's storm petrels and southern fulmars.

== See also ==
- Composite Gazetteer of Antarctica
- List of Antarctic and Subantarctic islands
- List of Antarctic islands south of 60° S
- Niles Island
- SCAR
- Territorial claims in Antarctica
