= O'Connor Island =

Island of Antarctica

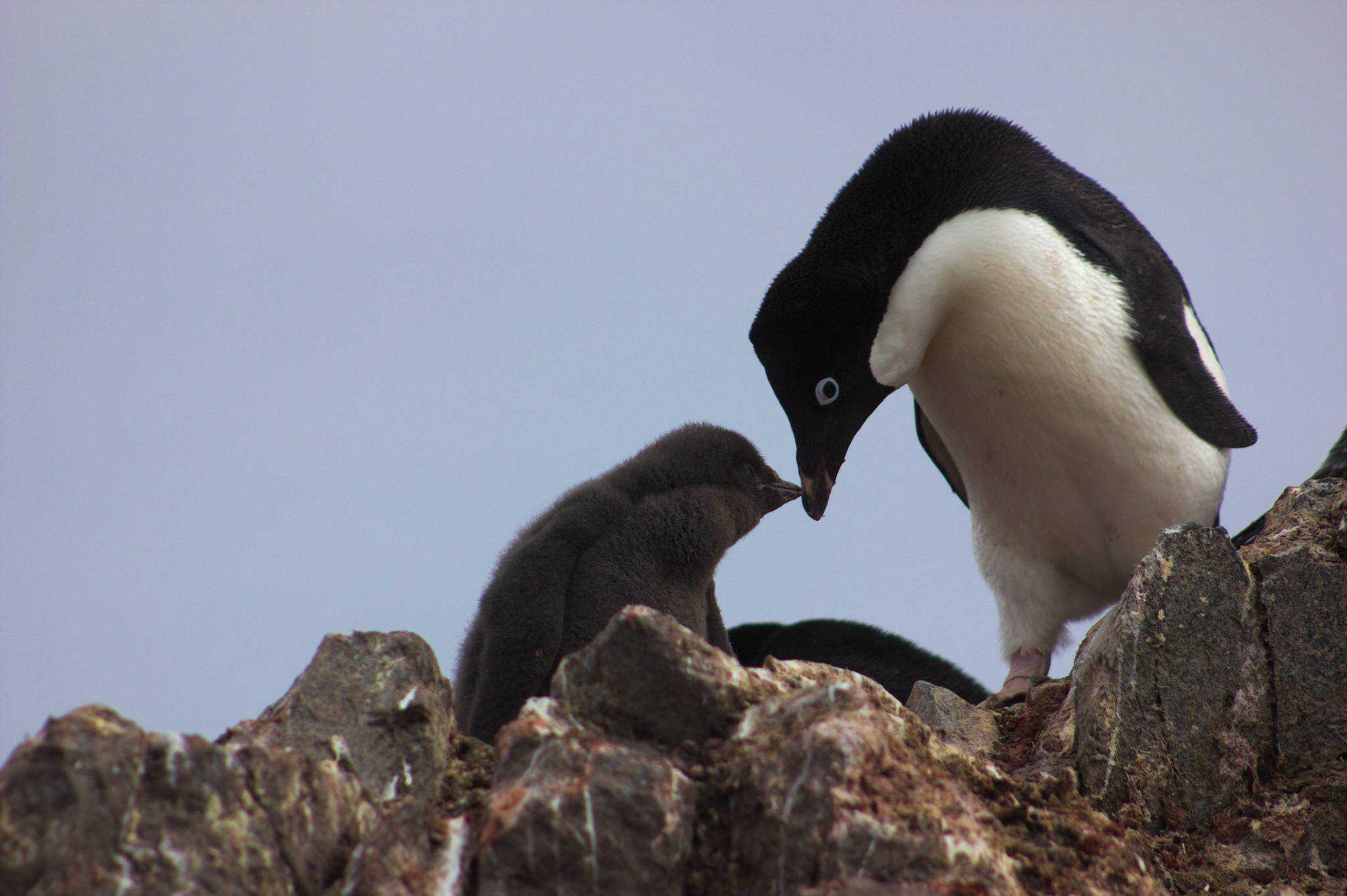
- Adélie penguins breed in the IBA

- Location within Antarctica

Geography
- Location: Wilkes Land, Antarctica
- Coordinates: 66°25′S 110°28′E
- Archipelago: Windmill Islands
- Length: 1.7 km (1.06 mi)
- Width: 0.7 km (0.43 mi)
- Highest elevation: 80 m (260 ft)

Administration
- Administered under the Antarctic Treaty System

Demographics
- Population: Uninhabited

O'Connor Island is a rocky island, 1.7 kilometres (1.1 mi) long, lying between Holl and Ford Islands in the southern part of the Windmill Islands of Wilkes Land, Antarctica.

== Discovery and naming ==
The island was first mapped from aerial photos taken by United States Navy Operation Highjump and Operation Windmill in 1947 and 1948. It was named by the Advisory Committee on Antarctic Names (US-ACAN) for Joseph (Jerry) J. O'Connor, who served as air crewman with the eastern task group of U.S. Navy Operation Highjump, 1946–47, and assisted U.S. Navy Operation Windmill parties in establishing astronomical control stations between the Wilhelm II Coast and Budd Coast during the 1947–48 season.

== Important Bird Area ==
A 1,052 ha site comprising both O'Connor Island and neighbouring Holl Island has been designated an Important Bird Area (IBA) by BirdLife International because it supports about 30,000 breeding Adélie penguins, estimated from 2011 satellite imagery. Other birds recorded as breeding in the IBA include snow petrels, Cape petrels, south polar skuas, Wilson's storm petrels and southern fulmars.

== See also ==
- Composite Antarctic Gazetteer
- List of Antarctic and Subantarctic islands
- List of Antarctic islands south of 60° S
- SCAR
- Territorial claims in Antarctica
