= Ford Island (Windmill Islands) =

Island of the Windmill Islands in Antarctica

- Location within Antarctica

Geography
- Location: Antarctica
- Coordinates: 66°24′S 110°31′E
- Archipelago: Windmill Islands
- Length: 2 km (1.2 mi)

Administration
- Administered under the Antarctic Treaty System

Demographics
- Population: Uninhabited

Ford Island is a rocky Antarctic island, 2.4 km (1.3 nmi) long, between O'Connor and Cloyd Islands in the southern part of the Windmill Islands. It was first mapped from air photos taken by USN Operation Highjump and Operation Windmill in 1947 and 1948. It was named by the US-ACAN for Homer D. Ford, photographic officer with the eastern task group of Operation Highjump and assistant photographic officer with the Operation Windmill parties which obtained air and ground photos of this area in January 1948.

== See also ==
- Composite Antarctic Gazetteer
- List of Antarctic and sub-Antarctic islands
- List of Antarctic islands south of 60° S
- SCAR
- Territorial claims in Antarctica
