= Plug-in electric vehicles in Hawaii =

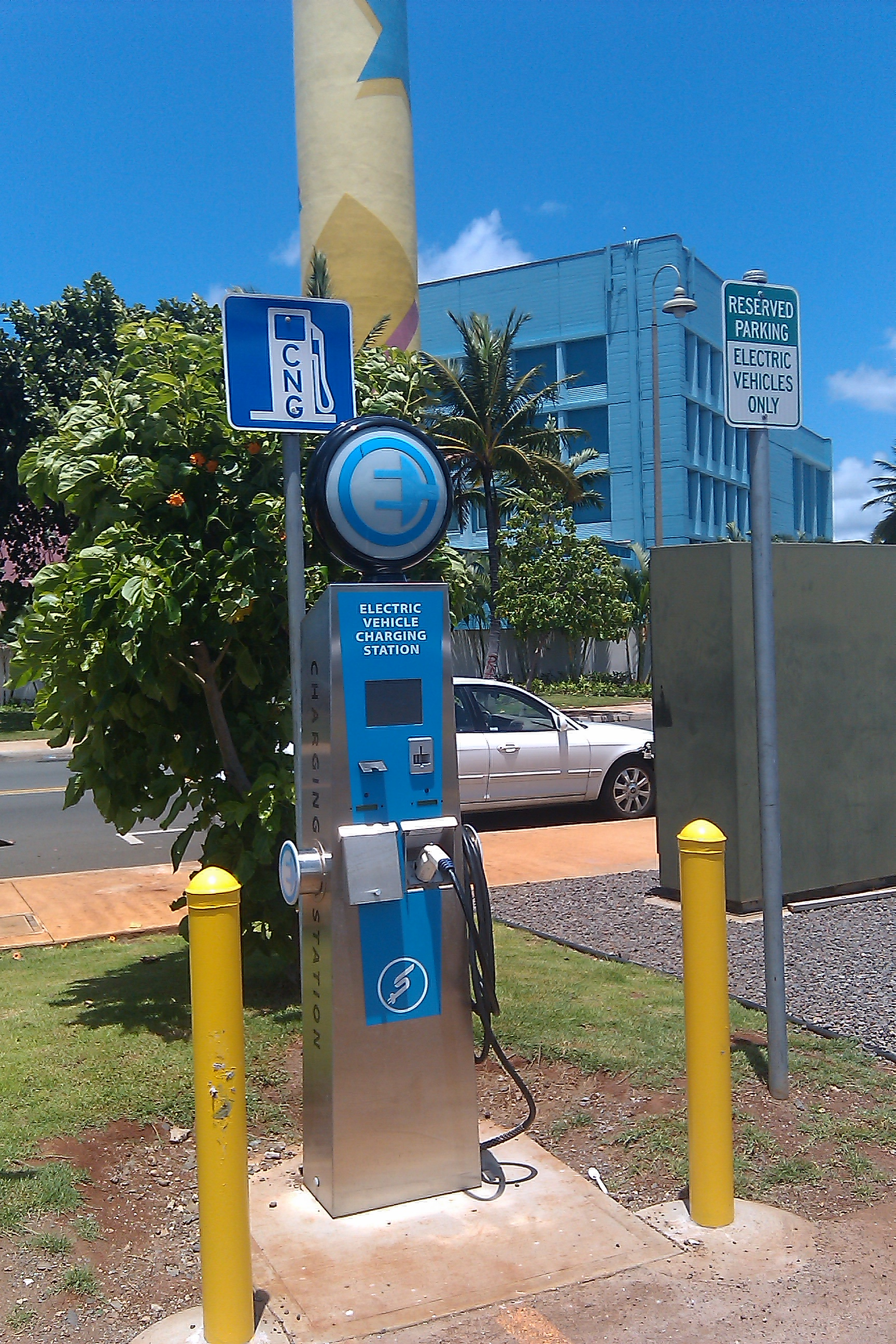
A public electric car charging station in Kakaʻako, Honolulu

As of June 2023, there were about 26,000 electric vehicles registered in Hawaii. The state has the second-highest number of electric vehicles per capita in the United States, behind California.

== Government policy ==
In January 2011, the state implemented a purchase rebate program of up to US$4,500 available for both the purchase of a plug-in electric car purchase, and up to US$5,000 for the purchase of both an electric vehicle and a charging station. The program ended in May 2012 as high consumer demand depleted the fund; more than 450 rebates were issued, totaling about US$2 million. Several efforts to add more funds were unsuccessful.

In June 2021, Governor David Ige signed three bills relating to electric vehicles into law, that do the following:

- Direct the state government to transition all of its light-duty vehicle fleet to electric by 2035
- Require state agencies that rent vehicles for work trips to prioritize renting electric vehicles
- Restart funding for the state's charging station rebate program

In November 2021, the state started allowing electric vehicles to use high-occupancy vehicle lanes regardless of the number of people in the vehicle.

== Charging stations ==
As of 2021, there are 363 public charging stations in Hawaii.

The Infrastructure Investment and Jobs Act signed into law in November 2021 includes US$2.6 million for charging stations in Hawaii.

As of February 2023, the state government offers rebates of $1,300–$4,500 for installations of AC charging stations, and $28,000–$35,000 for installations of DC charging stations.

== Public opinion ==
A poll conducted in November 2021 by Coltura showed 66% of voters in Hawaii supporting a complete transition to electric vehicles in the state by 2030.
