= Ford Island =

Islet at Pearl Harbor, Oahu, Hawaii, US

Native name: Mokuʻumeʻume (Island of Attraction) Poka ʻAilana (Ford Island)
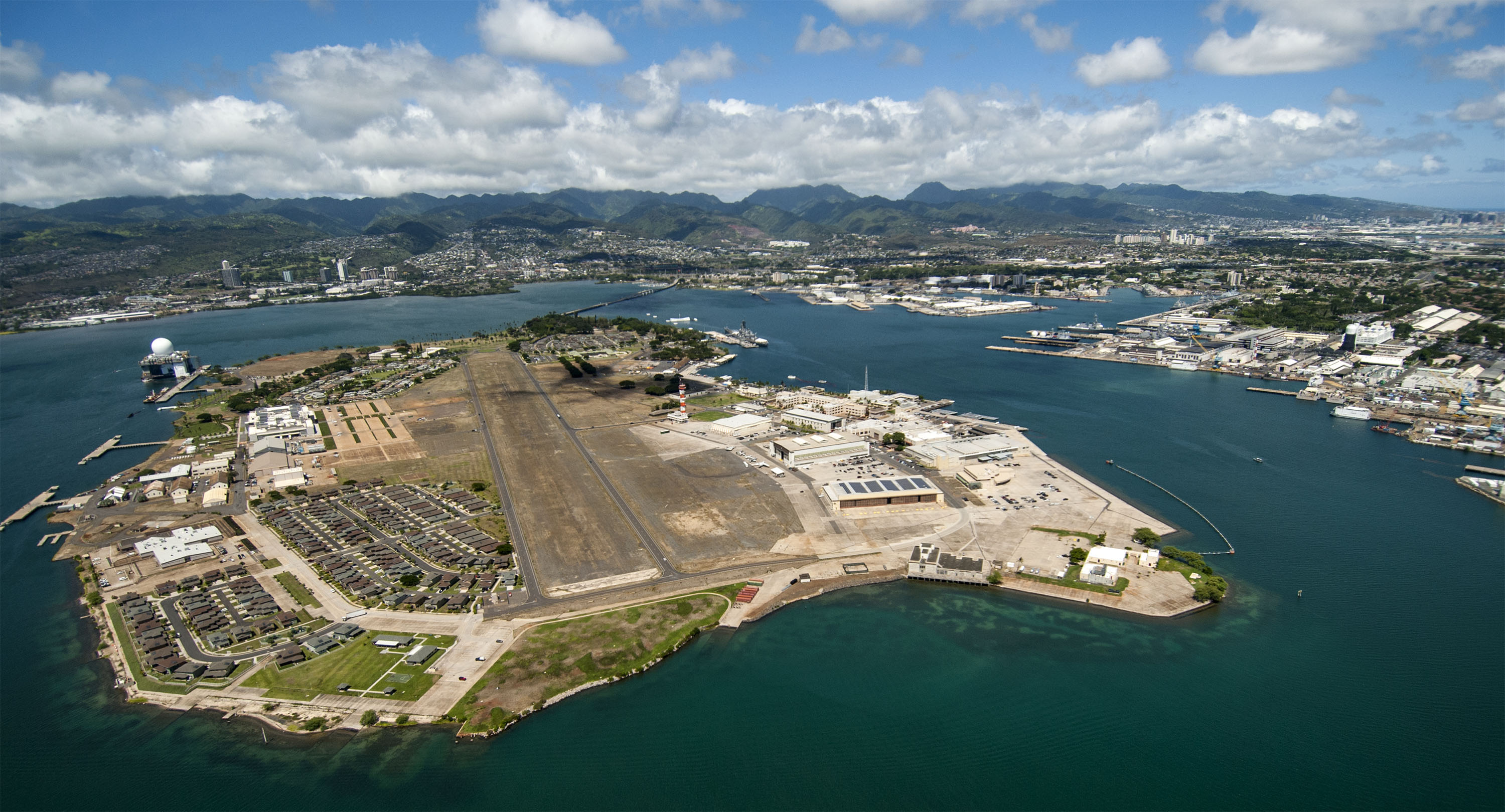
- Ford Island, located within Pearl Harbor, Oahu, Hawaii

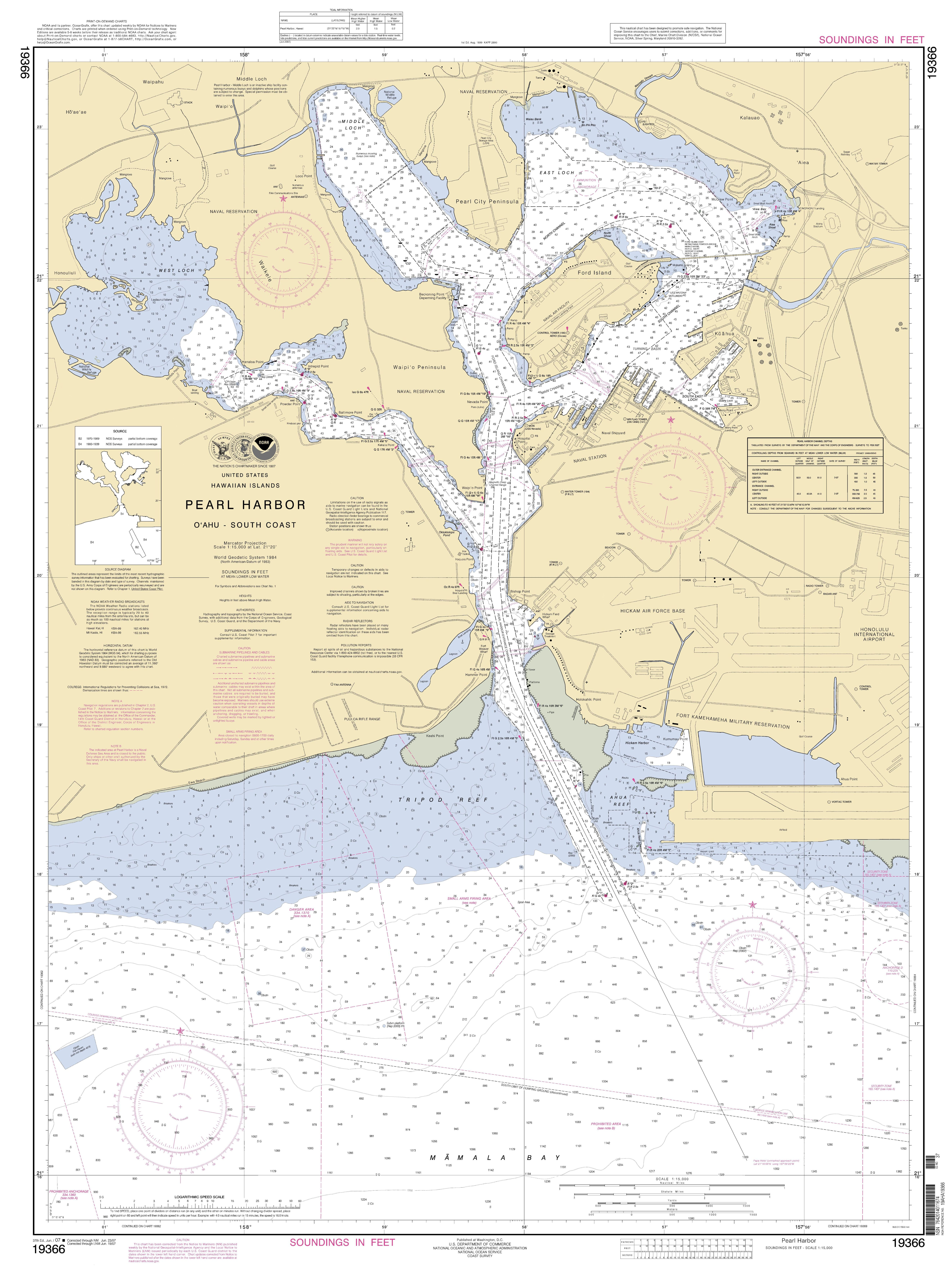
- Nautical chart of Pearl Harbor showing Ford Island in the northeast section

Geography
- Location: Oahu, Hawaii
- Coordinates: 21°21′50″N 157°57′37″W
- Adjacent to: East Loch, Pearl Harbor
- Area: 441 acres (178 ha)
- Length: 1.5 mi (2.4 km)
- Width: 0.75 mi (1.21 km)

Administration
- United States

Demographics
- Population: 368 (2000)

Ford Island (Hawaiian: Poka ʻAilana) is an islet in the center of Pearl Harbor, Oahu, in the U.S. state of Hawaii. It has been known as Rabbit Island, Marín's Island, and Little Goats Island; its native Hawaiian name is Mokuʻumeʻume. The island had an area of 334 acres (135 ha) when it was surveyed in 1825, which was increased during the 1930s to 441 acres (178 ha) with fill dredged out of Pearl Harbor by the United States Navy to deepen the harbor.

The island was the site of an ancient Hawaiian fertility ritual, which was stopped by Christian missionaries during the 1830s. The island was given by Kamehameha I to Spanish deserter Francisco de Paula Marín, and later returned to the monarchy. After the island was bought at auction by James Isaac Dowsett and sold to Caroline Jackson, shortly before her 1858 marriage to Dr. Seth Porter Ford, after which it was renamed Ford Island. After Ford's death, his son sold the island to the John Papa ʻĪʻī estate and it was converted into a sugarcane plantation.

In 1916, part of Ford Island was sold to the U.S. Army for use by an aviation division in Hawaii, and by 1939 the island was taken over by the U.S. Navy as a station for battleship and submarine maintenance. From the 1910s to the 1940s, the island continued to grow as a strategic center of operations for the U.S. Navy in the Pacific Ocean. Ford Island was at the center of the attack on Pearl Harbor and on the U.S. Pacific Fleet by the Imperial Japanese fleet on December 7, 1941. It was designated a National Historic Landmark in 1964, and the National Trust for Historic Preservation listed the island as one of the United States' most-endangered historic sites.

By the late 1990s, hundreds of millions of dollars had been invested in real estate development and infrastructure on and around Ford Island, including a new bridge, the Admiral Clarey Bridge. The island continues to serve an active role in the Pacific, hosting military functions at the Pacific Warfighting Center and civilian functions at NOAA's Pacific Tsunami Warning Center. The island has been featured in films such as Tora! Tora! Tora! and Pearl Harbor and receives tourists from the U.S. and abroad at the USS Arizona memorial and the USS Missouri museum.

== Geography ==
Ford Island is inside Pearl Harbor, South Oʻahu of the Hawaiian Islands. Pearl Harbor is divided into three large bodies of water: the West Loch, Middle Loch and East Loch, with Ford Island in the center of the East Loch. It is 1.5 miles (2.4 km) long and 0.75 miles (1.21 km) wide, and was enlarged from 334 to 441 acres (135 to 178 ha) between 1930 and 1940 with landfill dredged from the surrounding harbor. The land is a relatively flat plain rising from 5 to 15 feet (1.5 to 4.6 m) above mean water level, and slopes toward Pearl Harbor. It connects to the larger island of Oʻahu, surrounding Pearl Harbor, via a 4,672 ft (1,424 m) bridge at its northern tip that crosses east to Halawa Landing.

The island's soil is composed primarily of volcanic material, lagoonal deposits and coralline debris, with silty sand from the dredging. Its volcanic material is Aeolian ash, weathered tuff and basalt. Ford Island proper is a coral outcrop. There are two smaller islets near the island: Mokunui and Mokuiki.

=== Contamination ===
In 1991, the Navy discovered nine metals, two semi-volatile organic compounds and a polychlorinated biphenyl in Ford Island's soil, groundwater and marine sediment. Suspected sources were nine 225,000-U.S.-gallon (850-cubic-meter) fuel tanks on the east-central side of the island (from 1924 to 1954), a 4.4-acre (1.8 ha) landfill on the southwestern shore (from 1930 to 1960) and ordnance bunkers on the northeastern side. An investigation suggested covering the contaminated areas with clean soil. In 1994, the Navy considered removing the contaminated soil and installed six wells to monitor groundwater, but decided to follow the original recommendation in 1995 and capped the contaminated soil with topsoil and erosion-resistant vegetation (including Bermuda grass). The containment system was completed in 1996.

== Flora and fauna ==
The wildlife on Ford Island is likely very similar to that on Naval Station Pearl Harbor. Wildlife is sparse and dominated by invasive species such as the house mouse, mongoose, brown rat, black rat, house sparrow, Java sparrow and common mynah. An endangered owl, the endemic pueo (a subspecies of the short-eared owl), has been seen hunting on the island. Nearly all the plant life on the island is non-native, including edible cacti from California introduced in the late 1700s by Francisco de Paula Marín. The island's harbor was important to ancient Hawaiians for its ample supply of fish, including mullet, milkfish and Hawaiian anchovy. The National Park Service oversees and administers the Pearl Harbor National Memorial sites at Pearl Harbor and Ford Island.

== History ==
=== Ancient Hawaiians ===
Ancient Hawaiians called the island Mokuʻumeʻume ("isle of attraction" or "island of strife"), after the ceremony (ʻume) held during the Makahiki festival for married couples who were having difficulty conceiving children. In the Hawaiian language the word moku means to cut or sever in two, as well as an island or inlet. The word ʻume means to draw, attract or entice and was used to name the ceremony for the common people. Hawaii historian Herb Kawainui Kāne considered ʻume to be a courtship game. Those selected for ʻume (never virgins or the unmarried) would sing around a large bonfire while a tribal leader with a maile (wand) chanted, touching individual men and women. Those who were touched would find a secluded part of the island to have sex. Husbands and wives were not paired, and jealousy was discouraged. Children born of these unions were considered children of the husband, not the biological father. By 1830, this activity was forbidden by Christian missionaries.

The native Hawaiian people of the area were called Ke Awalau o Puʻuloa. They used the island to cultivate watermelon and to harvest pili grass for the construction of thatched roofs. According to Hawaiian legend, the goddess Kaʻahupahau killed a girl on the island; remorseful, she then proclaimed a law forbidding further killing. Kaʻahupa-hau's brother Kahiʻuka (sometimes referred to by historians as her son, Ku-maninini) was said to live in an underwater cavern off Ford Island with Kanekuaʻana, a giant water lizard which supplied food to the people of ʻEwa Beach.

=== Kamehamehas and 18th-century settlers ===
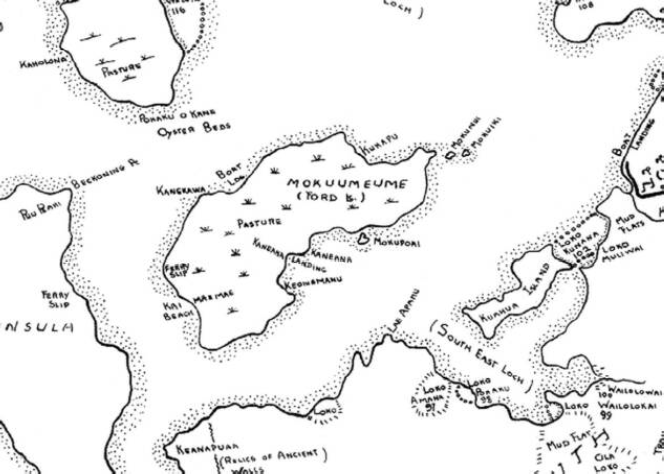
Map of Mokuʻumeʻume, compiled from maps dated 1873 to 1915

Although no historical records provide an exact date, researchers at the Hawaiian Historical Society believe that the island was given to Francisco de Paula Marín on February 9, 1818, and later named after him for his assistance in providing weapons used by Kamehameha I to conquer the island of Oʻahu. However, Marín wrote in an 1809 journal entry that he was given the island and its adjacent fishing waters as early as 1791. He used the land to raise sheep, hogs, goats and rabbits as provisions for ships, and grew plants and vegetables which he had imported.

In 1825, Admiral George Byron, the 7th Baron Byron arrived, commanding HMS Blonde, to return the remains of Kamehameha II and Queen Kamāmalu after their deaths in England of Measles. While on Oahu, he would map the Pearl River (known today as Pearl Harbor). The ship's naturalist, Andrew Bloxam, spent time on Ford Island hunting rabbits and wild ducks; its surveyor, Lieutenant Charles Robert Malden, called it Rabbits Island. In 1826, Hiram Paulding became the first American naval officer to visit the island. Marín's ownership claim to the island was cloudy; Hawaiians generally refused to recognize land ownership by foreigners. Kamehameha II believed that the island had been loaned to Marín and by the 1850s the island was split between Kamehameha IV—who purchased 214 acres (87 ha)—and High Chiefess Kekauōnohi, granddaughter of Kamehameha I, who was awarded 147 acres (59 ha) in the Great Māhele. On August 28, 1865, the island was bought at public auction for $1,040 by James I. Dowsett, who sold it to Caroline Jackson for $1 on December 28.

Dr. Seth Porter Ford arrived in 1851 from Boston, and practiced medicine at the U.S. Seamen's Hospital. Ford married Caroline Jackson in June 1866, taking control of the island and changing its name from Marín Island to Ford Island. When Ford died in 1866, it was transferred to his son, Seth Porter Ford, Jr. The island was managed by Sanford B. Dole on behalf of Ford's minor children until Ford, Jr. came of age and sold the island in 1891 to the John Papa ʻĪʻī land trust.

=== Sugar reciprocity ===
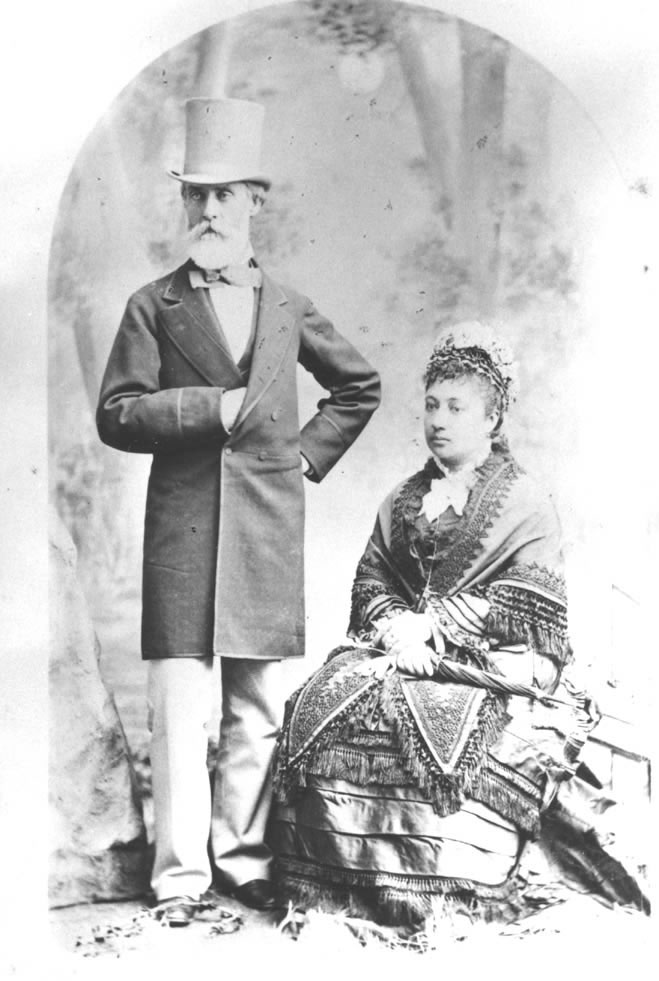
Charles Reed Bishop with his wife, Bernice Pauahi Bishop

Sugar had been a major export from Hawaii since Captain James Cook's arrival in 1778. During the 1850s, the U.S. import tariff on sugar from Hawaii was much higher than the import tariffs Hawaiians were charging the U.S., and Kamehameha III sought reciprocity.

As early as 1873, a United States military commission recommended attempting to obtain Ford Island in exchange for the tax-free importation of sugar to the U.S. At that time Major General John Schofield, U.S. commander of the military division of the Pacific, and Brevet Brigadier General Burton S. Alexander arrived in Hawaii to ascertain its defensive capabilities. U.S. control of Hawaii was considered vital for the defense of the west coast of the United States, and they were especially interested in Pu'uloa, Pearl Harbor. The sale of one of Hawaii's harbors was proposed by Charles Reed Bishop, a foreigner who had married into the Kamehameha family, had risen in the government to be Hawaiian Minister of Foreign Affairs, and owned a country home near Pu'uloa. He showed the two U.S. officers around the lochs, although his wife, Bernice Pauahi Bishop, privately disapproved of selling Hawaiian lands. As monarch, William Charles Lunalilo, was content to let Bishop run almost all business affairs but the ceding of lands would become unpopular with the native Hawaiians. Many islanders thought that all the islands, rather than just Pearl Harbor, might be lost and opposed any cession of land. By November 1873, Lunalilo canceled negotiations and returned to drinking, against his doctor's advice; his health declined swiftly, and he died on February 3, 1874.

Lunalilo left no heirs. The legislature was empowered by the constitution to elect the monarch in these instances and chose David Kalākaua as the next monarch. The new ruler was pressured by the U.S. government to surrender Pearl Harbor to the Navy. Kalākaua was concerned that this would lead to annexation by the U.S. and to the contravening of the traditions of the Hawaiian people, who believed that the land ('Āina) was fertile, sacred, and not for sale to anyone. In 1875, the United States Congress agreed to seven years of reciprocity in exchange for Ford Island. At the end of the seven-year reciprocity agreement, the United States showed little interest in renewal.

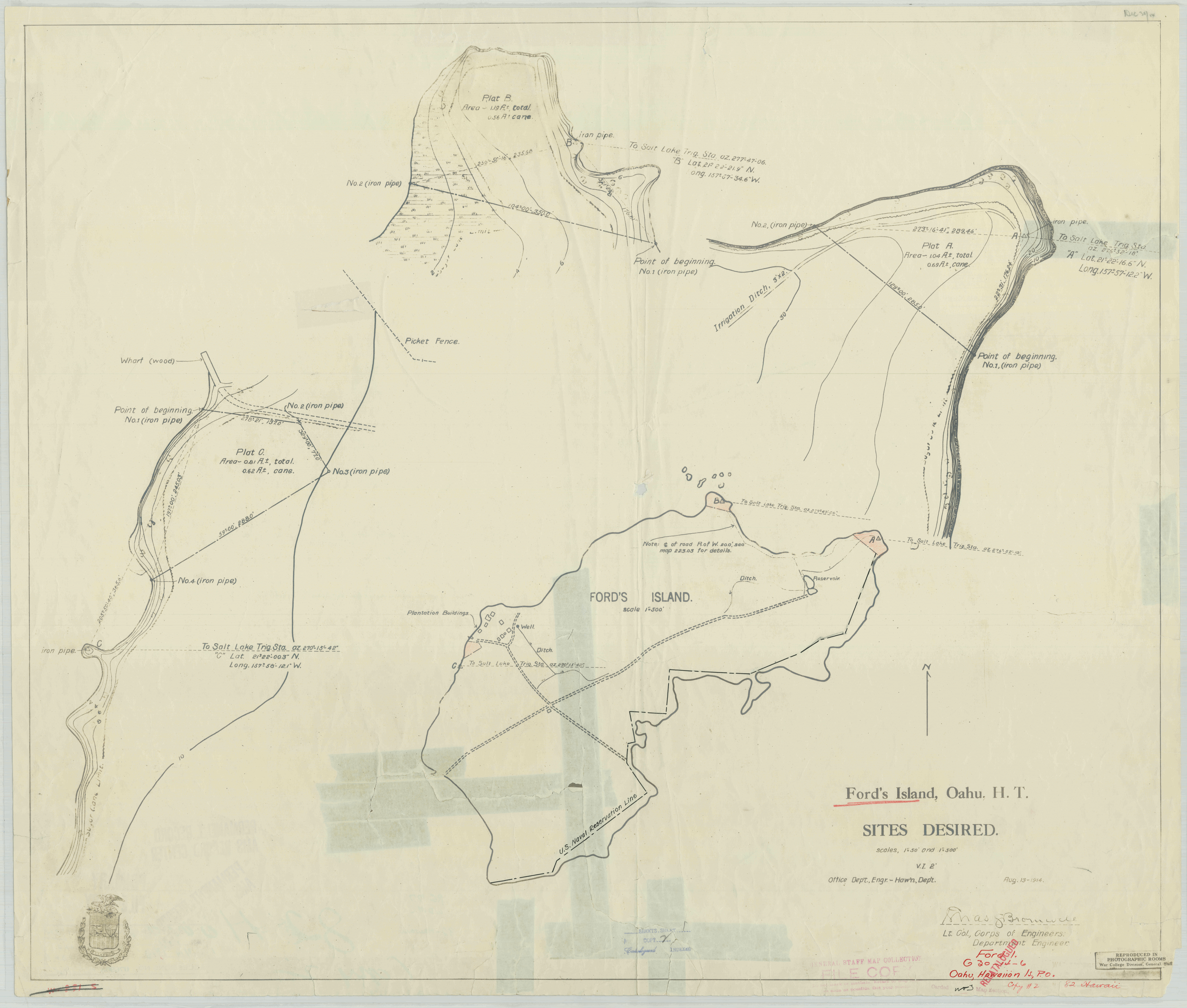
Map of Oʻahu Sugar Plantation on Ford Island, August 13, 1914

On January 20, 1887, the United States began leasing Pearl Harbor. Shortly afterwards, a group of mostly non-Hawaiians calling themselves the Hawaiian Patriotic League began the Rebellion of 1887. They drafted their own constitution on July 6, 1887. The new constitution was written by Lorrin Thurston, the Hawaiian Minister of the Interior who used the Hawaiian militia as threat against Kalākaua. Kalākaua was forced to dismiss his cabinet ministers and sign a new constitution which greatly lessened his power. It would become known as the "Bayonet Constitution" due to the force used.

With support from California (because the state had profited from the import of sugar), Kalākaua again approached Congress. When the United States still seemed uninterested in reciprocity, he threatened to forge more favorable export agreements with Australia or New Zealand. Congress feared that a treaty between Hawaii and Australia or New Zealand would result in annexation by one of those countries instead of the United States. Although Kalākaua was loath to give any foreign country land in Hawaii, he signed the treaty in September 1887.

The Oahu Sugar Company (also known as the Oahu Sugar Cane Plantation) leased about 300 acres (120 ha) from the John Papa ʻĪʻī estate (after their purchase of the island in 1891) to harvest sugar in 1899. The business was successful, and the company sublet land from Benjamin Dillingham on the Waipi'o peninsula (southeast of present Waipio) to build a 12-roller mill and railroad. Sugarcane was grown and harvested on Ford Island with a network of aqueducts from freshwater reservoirs, transported to Waipio by barge and then by rail to the mills.

In 1902, the nearby estate of Bernice Pauahi Bishop lost a crucial lawsuit brought by the United States to purchase land around Pearl Harbor for below its market value. Although the Bishop estate valued the land at $600 per acre, the United States was only willing to pay $30 per acre. A jury determined that the land would be sold to the United States at $75 per acre. Facing a similar lawsuit and interest in its land on Ford Island, the John Papa ʻĪʻī estate settled with the United States to deed twenty-five acres at no cost. In exchange, the U.S. dropped its suit for the entire island.

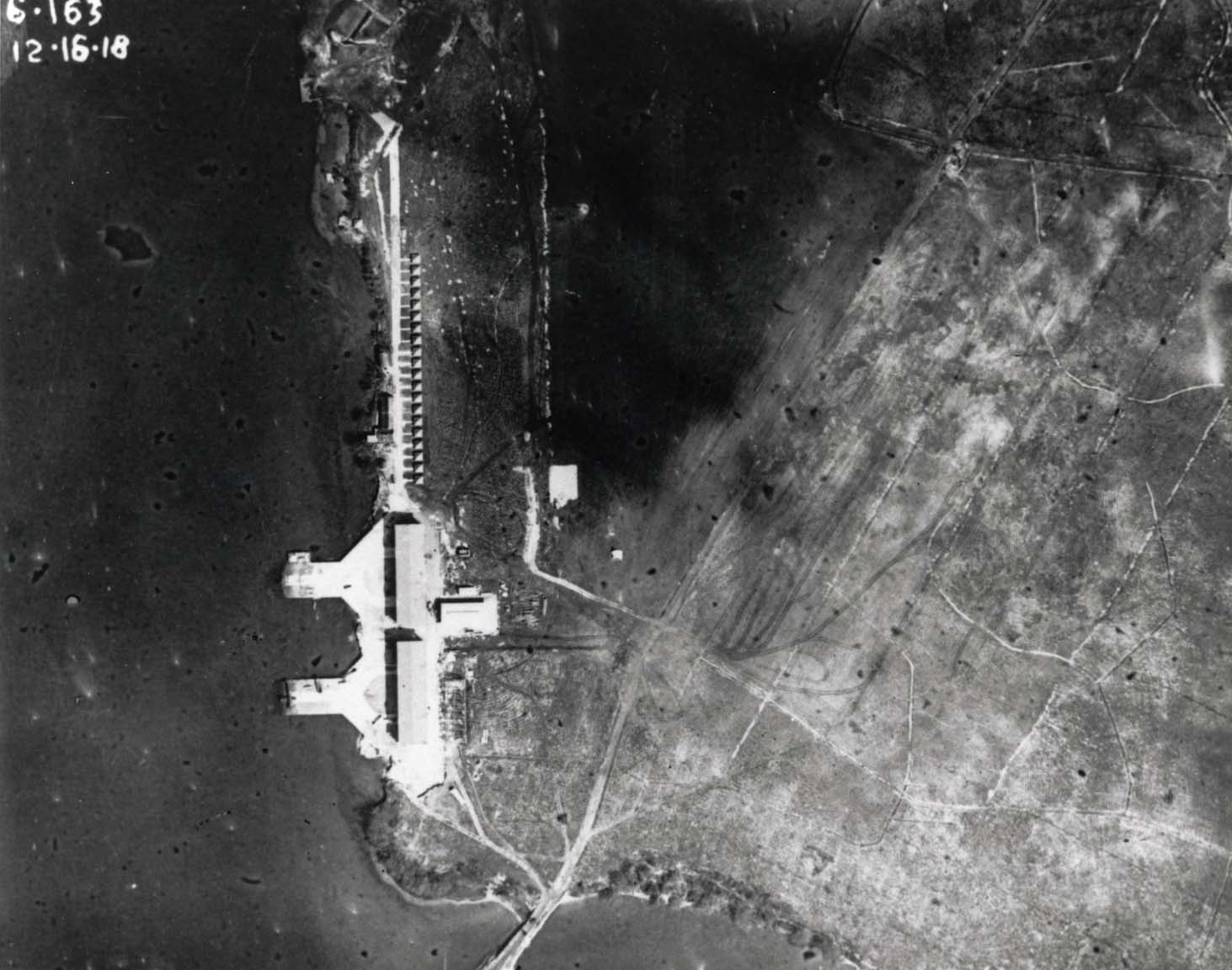
Earliest known aerial photo of Ford Island taken December 16, 1918

The military leased sections of the north and south sides of the island—25.83 acres (10.45 ha) for $3,000—from the John Papa ʻĪʻī estate to build 6-inch (15 cm) gun batteries: Battery Boyd and Battery Henry Adair. In 1917, the John Papa ʻĪʻī estate agreed to sell part of the Island to the United States for construction of an airfield, despite the Oahu Sugar Company complaining in court that the sale would hurt their business.

=== Army Air Service ===
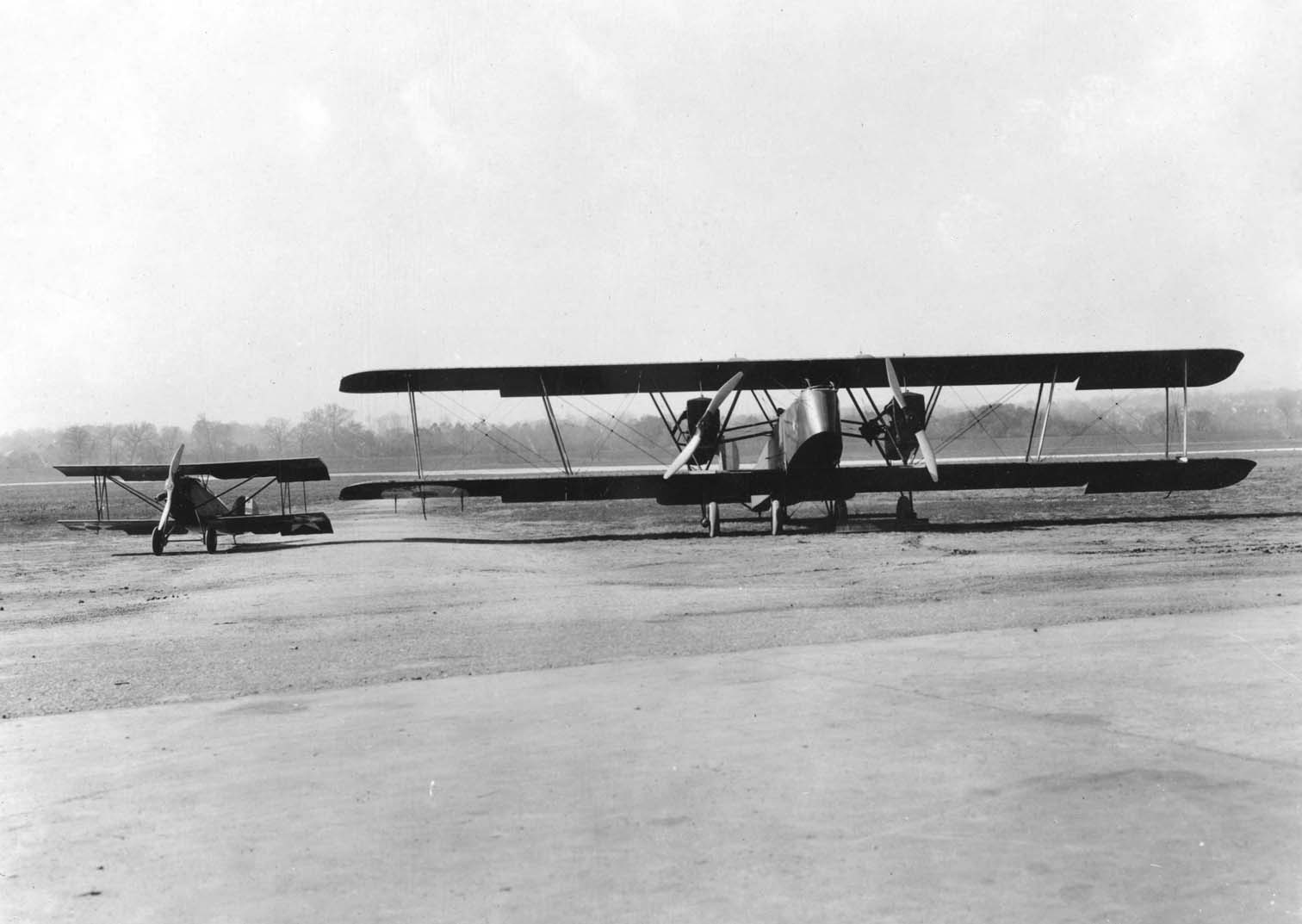
Martin MB-1 on Luke Field on August 15, 1918

In 1917, the 6th Aero Squadron was created in Honolulu, with Captain John F. Currey as its commander. Although 50 were assigned, only 49 arrived; one deserted en route. Currey chose Ford Island as the location for the new squadron and bought it from the John Papa ʻĪʻī land trust for $236,000, citing its access to water and winds as assets. When Currey was transferred to Washington, command of the squadron was given to Captain John B. Brooks and then Major Hugh J. Knerr, who built hangars and a runway. Early soldiers had to level the island, removing hills and boulders.

All housing and major hangars were completed in 1918, including a large steel-and-wood hangar, two concrete hangars for seaplanes and flying boats, a supply warehouse, a machine shop, a photography laboratory and a powerhouse. In 1919, the field was named Luke Field after Frank Luke, a World War I ace and Medal of Honor recipient. The U.S. Army's introduction of aviation to Ford Island triggered expansion throughout Hawaii with the development of civilian airports, the creation of the Hawaii chapter of the National Aeronautic Association, and a national flying code.

Army Air Force aircraft at Luke Field
Dates	Unit	Aircraft
1919–42	2nd Group (Observation), later 5th Group (Observation)	—
1918–27	6th Aero Squadron, later 6th Pursuit Squadron	N-9, R-6, HS2L, DH-4, JN-6, MB-3, Fokker D.VII
1924–27	19th Pursuit Squadron	JN-6, MB-3, S.E.5, DH-4
1920–22, 1927–39	4th Aero Squadron, later 4th Observation Squadron	DH-4, O-19, OA-1, B-12, P-12
1922–39	23rd Squadron, later 23rd Bombardment Squadron	NBS-1, JN-6, DH-4
1923–39	72nd Bombardment Squadron	DH-4, NBS-1, LB-5
1930–39	50th Observation Squadron, later 50th Reconnaissance Squadron	O-19

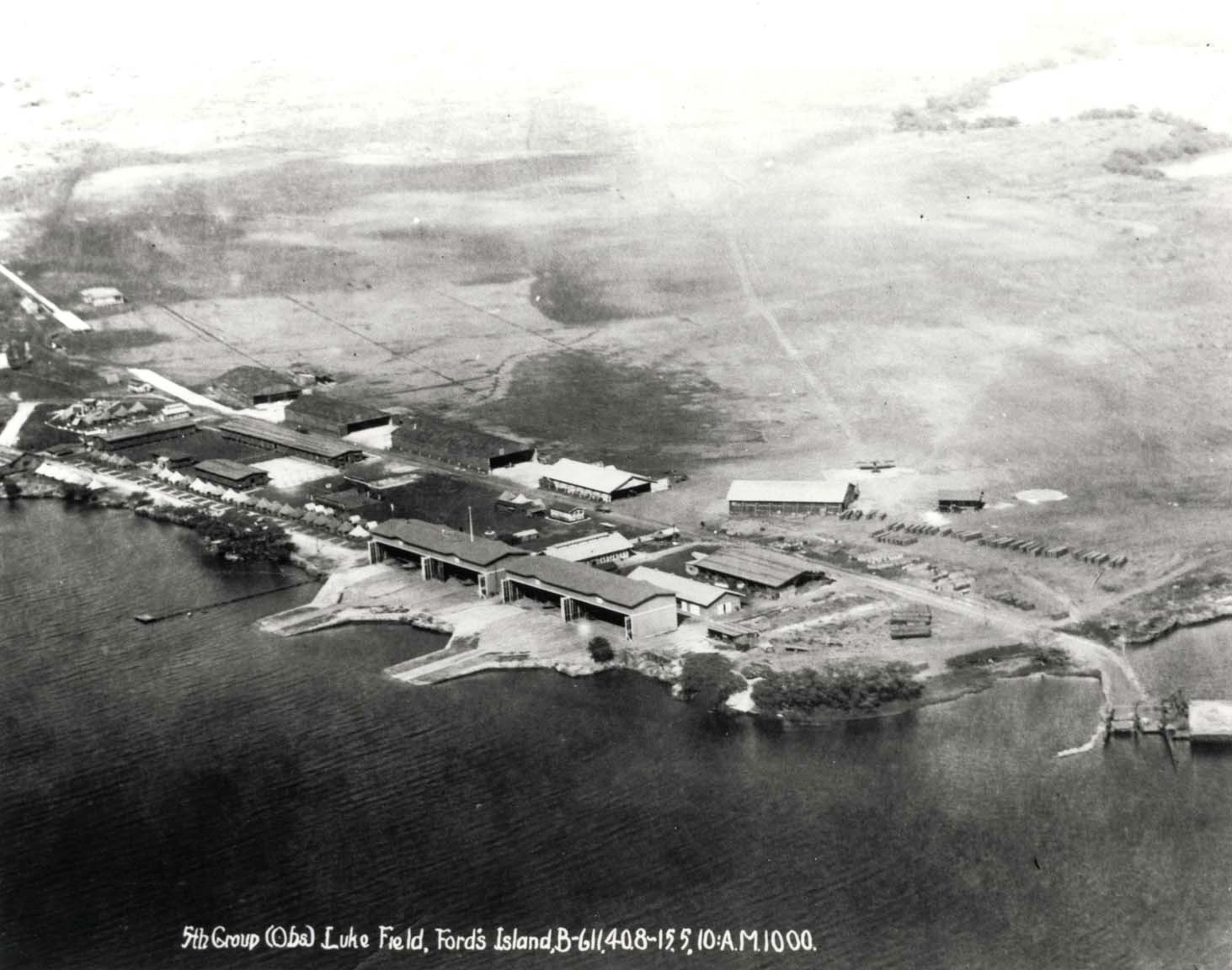
Ford Island, circa 1919–21

The Navy decided that a Hawaiian base was a necessity, considering the Army field at Ford Island an ideal candidate. Naval Air Station Pearl Harbor, consisting of nine officers and fifty-five men, was commissioned on December 19, 1919. Although the Navy attempted to displace the Army from the island and designate it solely for naval use, U.S. Secretary of War Newton D. Baker divided the island equally between the military branches. The Army received the west side of the island, and the Navy the southeastern side. Lieutenant Commander Robert D. Kirk-Patrick was sent to establish a naval station on the island with four airplanes and fifty-five men. Kirk-Patrick's men had two Curtiss HS2L flying boats and two N-9 planes salvaged from World War I, which they stored in two large canvas hangars across the harbor from the island. After the naval hangars were commissioned on January 17, 1923, by Lieutenant Commander John Rodgers, the detachment moved onto Ford Island and received Naval Aircraft Factory TS, Felixstowe F5L, Curtiss H-16, Keystone PK-1 and Douglas DT type aircraft. To accommodate ship berthing the Navy built a concrete-and-stone quay around the entire island, and in 1926, they received Vought FU, Vought VE-7 and Vought VE-9 biplanes.

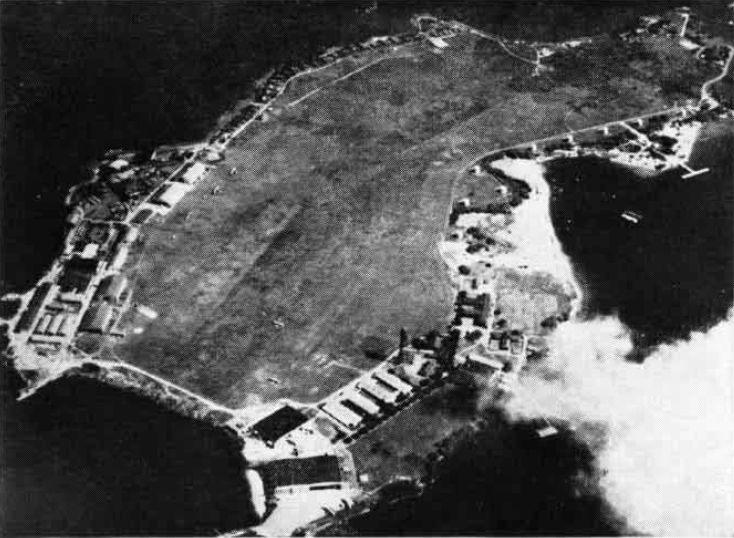
Aerial photo of Ford Island in 1930

During the 1930s, the Navy contracted a $1.5 million dredging of Pearl Harbor to allow larger battleships and the fleet's carriers to enter it. Work began in May 1940 resulting in 13,000,000 cubic yards (9,900,000 m^{3}) of material dredged from the opening of Pearl Harbor to build a channel to Ford Island as well as to create a turning channel around the island. Material was also dredged to deepen the West Loch, East Loch, and Middle Loch for the mooring of battleships. With dredged material used as land fill, the island's size was increased from 334 acres (135 ha) to 441 acres (178 ha).

The Navy replaced its PK, F5L, and H16 aircraft with newer models (see table below). In 1933 VP-8F arrived on station, and in 1935 the army bombers had become too large to be maintained and stored at Luke Field. Construction began on a new Army airfield, Hickam Army Airfield, named after pioneer U.S. Army Air Corps pilot Lieutenant Colonel Horace Meek Hickam. From 1936 to 1940 Pan American flew its Clipper service into Ford Island, using it as a refueling stop between the United States and Asia. The Navy built a $25,000 boathouse, spent $579,565 on a new crew barracks and built a firehouse, water-supply and lighting systems. In June 1936 the Navy lengthened the island's landing field by 400 feet (120 m), to 3,000 feet (910 m). In March 1937 Amelia Earhart, on her second visit to Luke Field, crashed her Lockheed Electra on takeoff.

Naval aircraft at Naval Air Station Pearl Harbor in 1931
Unit	Aircraft
Patrol Squadron 1	6x T2D
Patrol Squadron 4	12 PD-1
Patrol Squadron 6	6x T4M-1; 6x T3M-2
Reconnaissance Squadron 6	2x OL-8; 1x O2U

In 1939, after three years of construction, Hickam Field opened. The Army transferred its operations there, leaving Luke Field under Navy control. The latter was renamed Naval Air Station Ford Island, and became the headquarters of Patrol Wing 2; its former namesake was re-honored with a new base, Luke Air Force Base in Arizona. A September 8, 1939, presidential emergency proclamation spurred the rapid construction of new facilities to prepare the island for additional operations. This included additional barracks, a new assembly and repair hangar, an administration building, a dispensary, a control tower, a laundry and a theater. At the height of World War II, over 40,000 people lived or worked on the island.

=== Attack on Pearl Harbor ===
Beginning in the 1930s, Imperial Japan attempted to expand its territory into China. Opposed to these aggressive actions, the United States, Britain, and the Netherlands froze Japanese assets and imposed economic restrictions which prohibited the exportation of aircraft fuel as well as steel and iron to Japan, affecting 90% of Japan's war production needs. Japan was forced to either give up its expansion plans or find alternative raw materials to continue producing equipment for the war. Japan chose to continue with its plans, but decided it needed to neutralize any threat from the United States first.

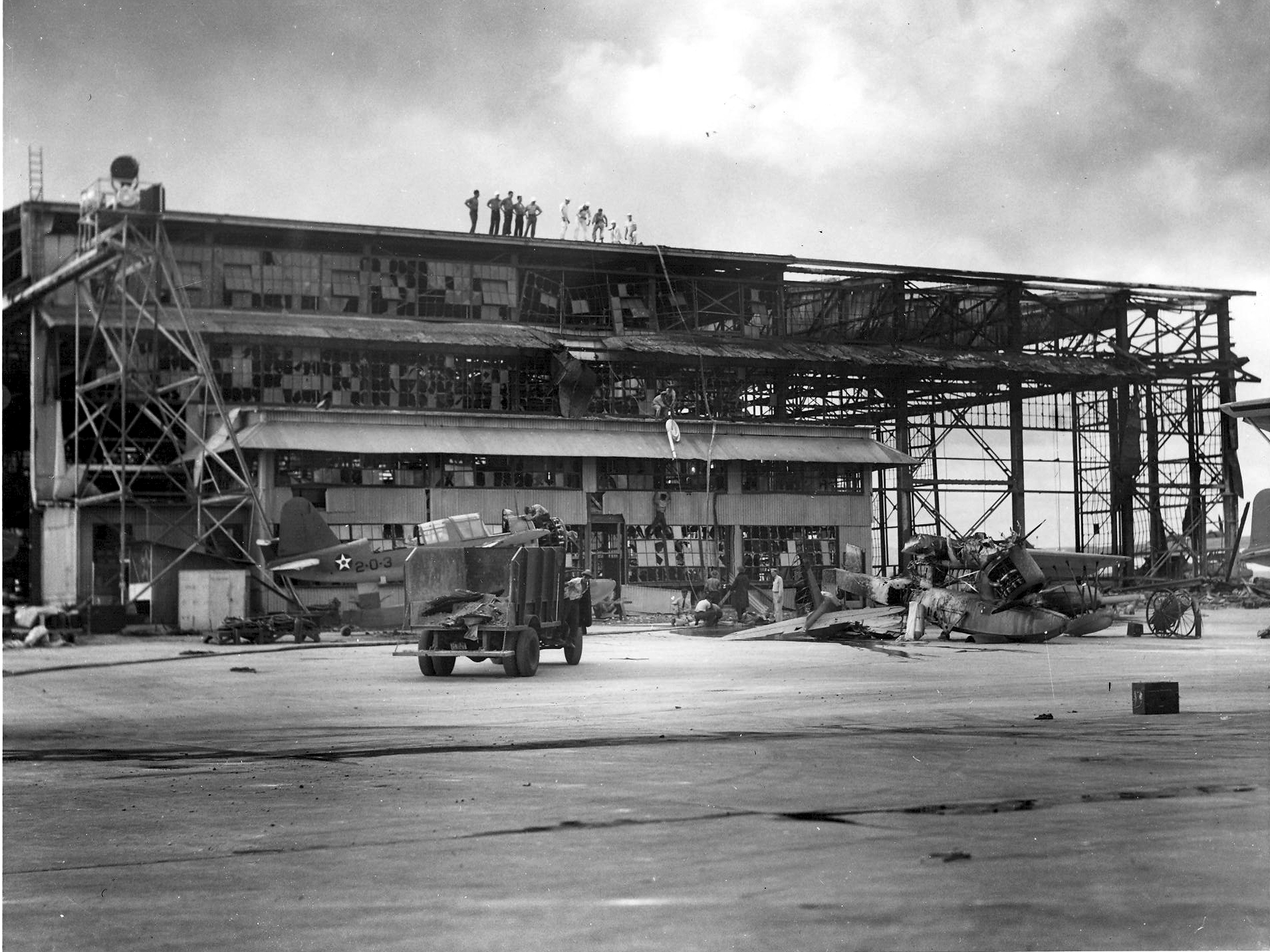
Damaged hangar on Ford Island after the attacks

Ford Island was the headquarters of Patrol Wing Two, an important target for the first-wave airborne raiders in the December 7, 1941, Japanese attack on Pearl Harbor. Before dawn, the U.S. strategic center in the Pacific consisted of the seven battleships moored along Battleship Row and the six pairs of interrupted quays along the east side of Ford Island. Quay F-2 (the southernmost), which usually berthed an aircraft carrier, was empty. The Pacific Fleet flagship California was moored northeastward, at F-3. Side by side with Maryland was Oklahoma (outboard), followed by Tennessee with West Virginia outboard. Behind Tennessee was Arizona alongside the repair ship Vestal. Closing the row was Nevada, alone at F-8. These battleships, from eighteen to twenty-five years old, represented all but two of those available to the Pacific Fleet. Pennsylvania was also in Pearl Harbor, being dry-docked at the Navy Yard. The ninth battleship of the fleet, Colorado, was being overhauled on the West Coast. These nine battleships taken together were one short of equaling Japan's active battle fleet.

Pearl Harbor during the attack
Map of Pearl Harbor, with locations of battleships and facilities	1: California; 2: Maryland; 3: Oklahoma; 4: Tennessee; 5: West Virginia; 6: Arizona; 7: Nevada; 8: Pennsylvania; 9: Ford Island NAS; 10: Hickam Field A: Oil storage tanks B: CINCPAC; C: Submarine base D: Naval yard
Depth key for Pearl Harbor map	1: California; 2: Maryland; 3: Oklahoma; 4: Tennessee; 5: West Virginia; 6: Arizona; 7: Nevada; 8: Pennsylvania; 9: Ford Island NAS; 10: Hickam Field A: Oil storage tanks B: CINCPAC; C: Submarine base D: Naval yard

The initial bombs struck the island at 07:57 local time, prompting the historic dispatch: "Air Raid, Pearl Harbor—this is no drill." The battleships ringing Ford Island were the Japanese attackers' primary targets. Twenty-four of the forty Japanese torpedo planes were assigned to attack Battleship Row, and five more came over to that side of Ford Island after failing to find battleships in other parts of the harbor. The planes carried 29 Type 91 aerial torpedoes, each with a high-explosive payload of 450 pounds (200 kg), of which 12 are thought to have found their targets: two in California, one in Nevada and a possible total of nine in Oklahoma and West Virginia; the latter two ships sank within minutes of being hit.

Horizontal bomber aircraft delivering armor-piercing bombs attacked as the last torpedo planes finished, and other horizontal and dive bombers came in later. The aircraft registered many direct hits and damaging near-misses, including two each on California, Maryland and Tennessee and several more on West Virginia.

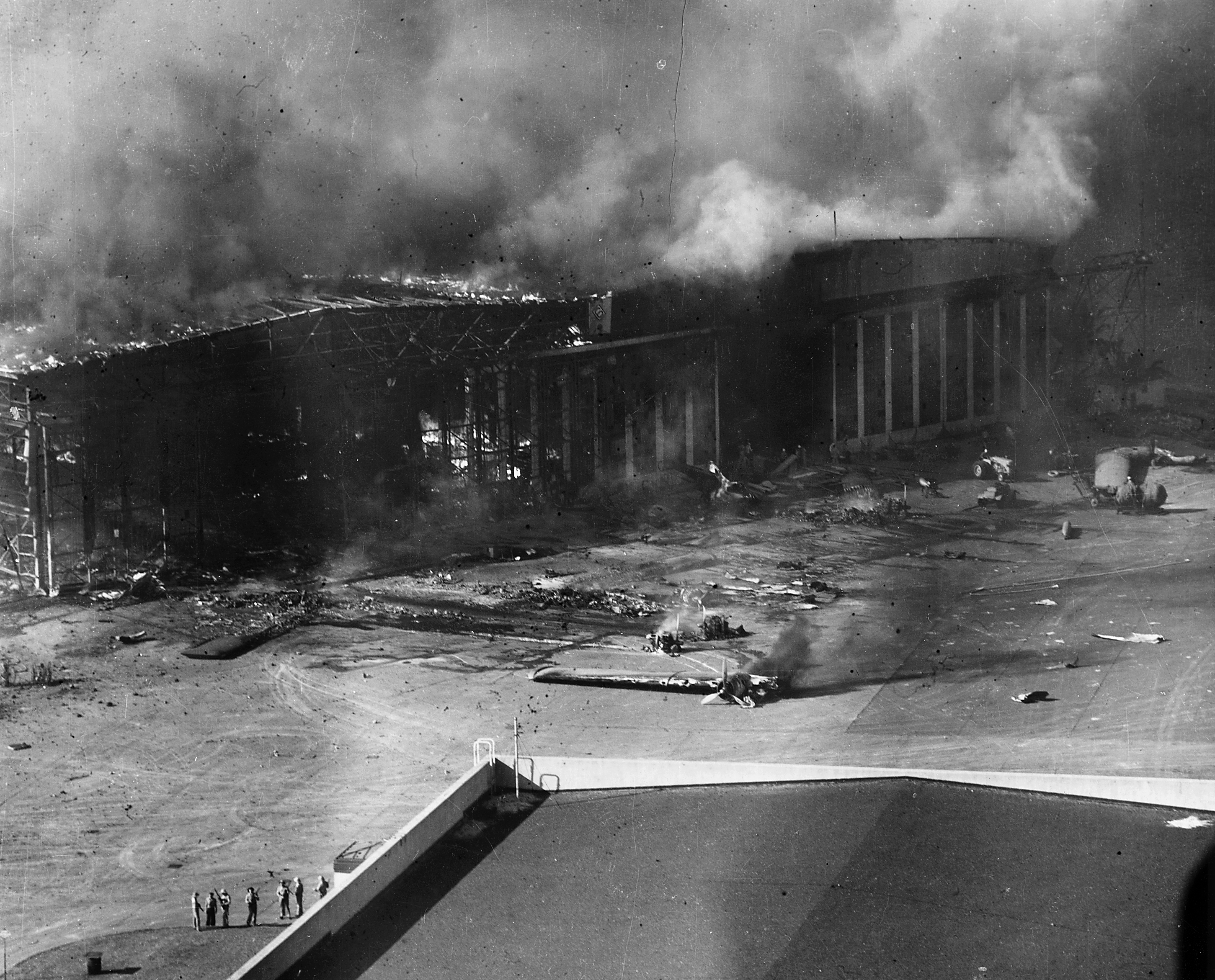
Hangar 6 in flames after the attack on Ford Island

A bomb meant for California hit Hangar 6 on the island, igniting it. Additional bombs hit Hangar 38 (a dud), the dispensary courtyard (leaving a large crater) and the road outside the repair-and-assembly hangar. Only one man, Theodore Wheeler Croft, was killed on the island while standing guard duty.

The bombers' most notable success was Arizona. A bomb exploded near the forward magazines, triggering a catastrophic explosion which immediately sank the ship. The island's freshwater supply was cut off when Arizona severed the main water line and the auxiliary line was destroyed at the Pearl Harbor end. USS Nevada, which was the battleship division's duty ship that morning, eventually got underway during the attack. She was hit repeatedly by dive bombers who spotted a ship escaping from Ford Island. In order to not chance blocking the channel to the mouth of Pearl Harbor(blocking the entire harbor), the decision was made to run Nevada aground at "Hospital Point".

Several planes from the aircraft carrier Enterprise, near Hawaii after a mission to Wake Island, arrived in the midst of the attack; four were shot down by American air-defense friendly fire. H. L. Young, commander of Enterprise air group, attempted to man the control tower to provide communications between the island, Enterprise, and the planes. However, he reported that although he attempted to communicate with Enterprise by radio from Ford Island, the communications systems there were inadequate, and he attributed the friendly fire to ineffective radio communications. After attempting to notify as many ships and anti-aircraft batteries as possible, several planes from Enterprise and others from Ford Island's complement were again airborne within hours to search for the attackers. Some of these search planes were again shot down on their return by friendly fire from the Ford Island defense, which was on high alert.

In addition to Battleship Row and the island's naval field, the fixed moorings on the western side of Ford Island (capable of securing battleships or aircraft carriers) were high-priority targets. Just west of the island, the seaplane tender Curtiss was hit by a crashing dive bomber, a bomb and fragments of another bomb. She was then unsuccessfully attacked by a Japanese midget submarine, which fired a torpedo before being sunk by the destroyer Monaghan. Hangar 6 and several patrol seaplanes and other aircraft on Ford Island (33 out of 70 of the island's planes) were destroyed.

The USS Utah (BB-31), a Florida class battleship- an older ship launched December 1909 and by 1941 in service as a training ship, was also moored on the western side of the island and was sunk by torpedoes. A total of 58 officers and enlisted were killed and 461 survived. Attempts to use the same methods as "Oklahoma" to right the Utah were unsuccessful. There is now a memorial near the remains of the ship.

==== Aftermath ====
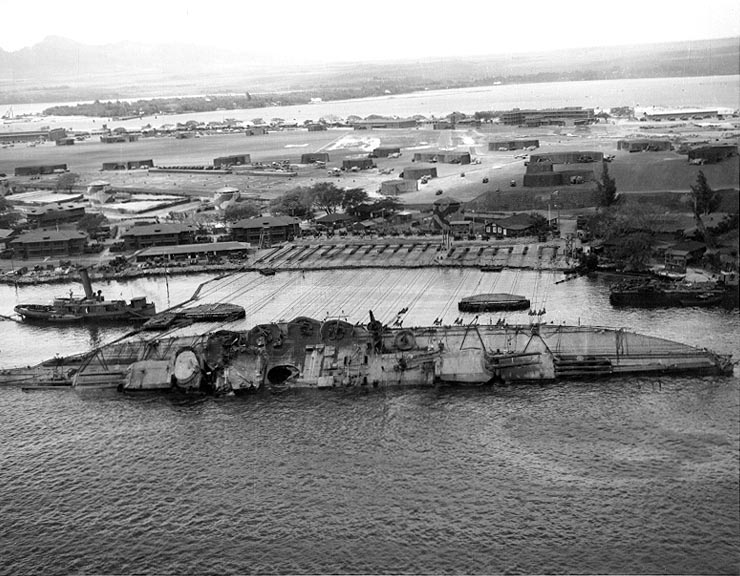
USS Oklahoma, righted to about 30 degrees on March 29, 1943, during salvage at Pearl Harbor

The Japanese disabled all seven battleships on Battleship Row. Maryland, Tennessee and Pennsylvania were repaired in only a few weeks and three others within a year, but Oklahoma and Arizona were total losses. The weakened state of the US Pacific Fleet would allow the Japanese Navy to hold the initiative until the Guadalcanal Campaign eight months later.

Enterprise launched aircraft to patrol Ford Island and search for Japanese carriers. Five American pilots returning from missions to hunt down the Japanese fleet were mistakenly shot down by Ford Island anti-aircraft gunners while attempting to land. The island's commanding officer said about the friendly-fire losses, "Somebody let fly and I never saw so many bullets in the air in my life and never expect to ... all tracer bullets at night."

After the attack, ROTC cadets from the University of Hawaii were assigned to active duty guarding strategic buildings. Because of the island's lack of fresh water and electric power to the dispensary, a temporary hospital had to be set up at the #2 barracks. The island's gasoline tank was emptied and refilled with water; trenches were dug, and buildings camouflaged. Its runway was cleared of over three tons of scrap metal in two hours. The Marines who had picked up rifles for guard duty were tasked with feeding and clothing the soldiers and sailors. Twenty prisoners from the island's brig were marched to the Marine barracks and put to work without incident; some received commuted sentences for their efforts. That evening, Hawaiians were instructed to observe an indoor blackout, stay off the telephone, keep extra buckets of water available for fighting fires and keep cars off the streets (parking them on lawns, if necessary).

Sixty concrete revetments were constructed to protect aircraft from another attack, and the Navy laid down a 16-inch (410 mm) water main from across the harbor. A new control tower was commissioned on May 1, 1942, and the Navy built bomb shelters and gas-decontamination chambers. Due to the need for better control of the US Pacific Fleet, its headquarters moved to Ford Island.

During the next few weeks, the Navy set up twenty-one large winches on the island to turn Oklahoma upright so it could be re-floated and patched before being scrapped. Coral was piled between the ship and the island so the ship would roll upright, instead of sliding toward the shore. Despite recovery efforts and patching, Oklahoma sank during a mid-Pacific storm while it was being towed to the scrapyard. Nevada, California, West Virginia and the minelayer USS Oglala were re-floated and salvaged by the Navy. The entire salvage operation took 20,000 man-hours underwater and 5,000 dives to recover human remains, weapons, ammunition and artifacts of historic or military importance.

== Naval Auxiliary Landing Field Ford Island ==
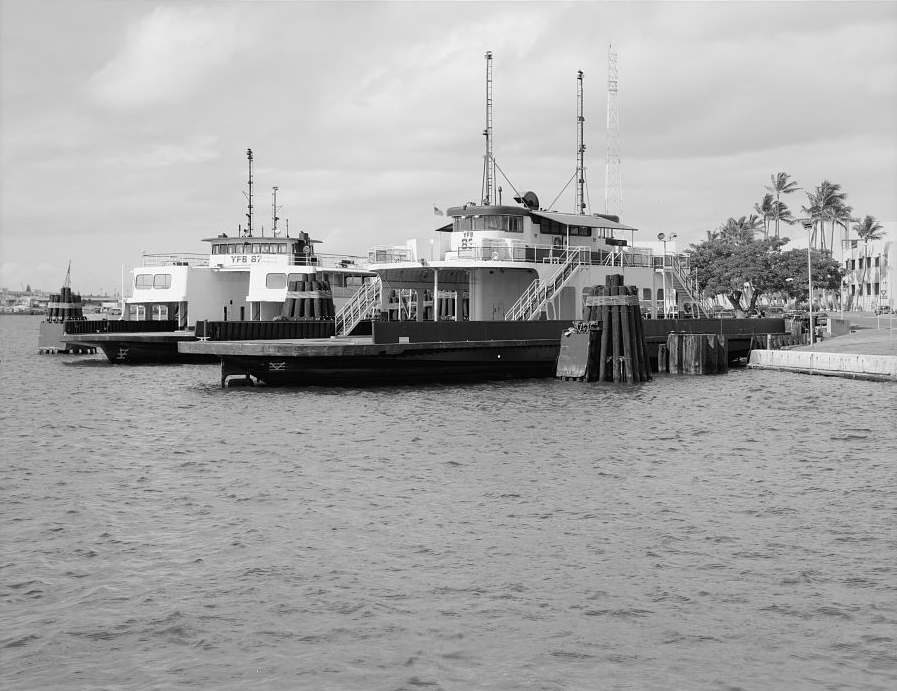
Moko Holo Hele (left) and Waa Hele Honoa, ferries serving Ford Island

The US Pacific Fleet established the Fleet Intelligence Center, Pacific (FICPAC) on Ford Island by 1955 as the Vietnam War escalated and an additional intelligence branch was needed in addition to the one in Guam. With little other use of the island, as naval and air operations were moved to facilities on the side of the Pearl Harbor previously owned by the Bishop estate, the Navy decommissioned Naval Air Station Ford Island in 1966. The island continued to be controlled by the Navy as a sub-component of Naval Station Pearl Harbor.

On February 20, 1970, the 4,000-foot (1,200 m) runway at NALF Ford Island was opened to civilian flight training operations, primarily local Army, Navy, Air Force and Marine Corps flying clubs. Itinerant military helicopter training activities also continued at NALF Ford Island during this period. Hawaii (which achieved statehood in 1959) contracted with the US Navy to allow touch-and-go landings until 1972, when the airfield was opened to students making their first solo flights. The island's use as a training center helped relieve congestion at nearby Honolulu International Airport. After its active-duty commission on February 1, 1973, the Third Fleet moved its headquarters to Ford Island, where it remained until its 1991 move to San Diego. The island remained home to Navy officers and several naval headquarters.

Ford Island Air Traffic Statistics
1970s	Year	1970	1971	1972	1973	1974	1975	1976	1977	1978	1979
1970s	Operations	N/A					176,811	173,908	157,621	177,767	177,767
1980s	Year	1980	1981	1982	1983	1984	1985	1986	1987	1988	1989
1980s	Operations	142,438	123,419	108,828	84,857	71,542	85,102	75,429	62,406	77,456	29,128
1990s	Year	1990	1991	1992	1993	1994	1995	1996	1997	1998	1999
1990s	Operations	80,193	69,468	62,184	62,184	54,277	51,942	52,731	39,671	39,992	50,441

For the 12-month period ending March 4, 1998, the airport had 39,992 aircraft operations, an average of 110 per day: 98 percent general aviation and two percent military. On July 1, 1999, all military and civilian general-aviation activity at NALF Ford Island ended when NAS Barbers Point was closed in a BRAC action and became the present civilian Kalaeloa Airport and Coast Guard Air Station Barbers Point. The new airport was open to general aviation and rendered NALF Ford Island redundant.

Before the completion of the Admiral Clarey Bridge, access to Ford Island was by ferry. Two diesel-powered ferries, Waa Hele Honoa (YFB-83) and Moko Holo Hele (YFB-87), served the island. The Waa Hele Honoa (meaning 'canoe go to land') was purchased in 1959 for $274,000, and pressed into service by the Navy on March 3, 1961. It is the older and larger of the two ferries, at 181 feet (55 m), with a capacity of 750 people and 33 vehicles. The other, Moko Holo Hele (meaning 'boat go back and forth') was purchased for $1.1 million on May 25, 1970. At 162 feet (49 m), its capacity was 750 people and 42 vehicles. Both ferries were operated by US Navy personnel, and access to the island was restricted to US military personnel, their dependents and invited guests. In addition to the two car ferries, there were several smaller "foot ferries" allowing pedestrians to travel between Ford Island and alternate landings around Pearl Harbor.

=== Rebirth ===
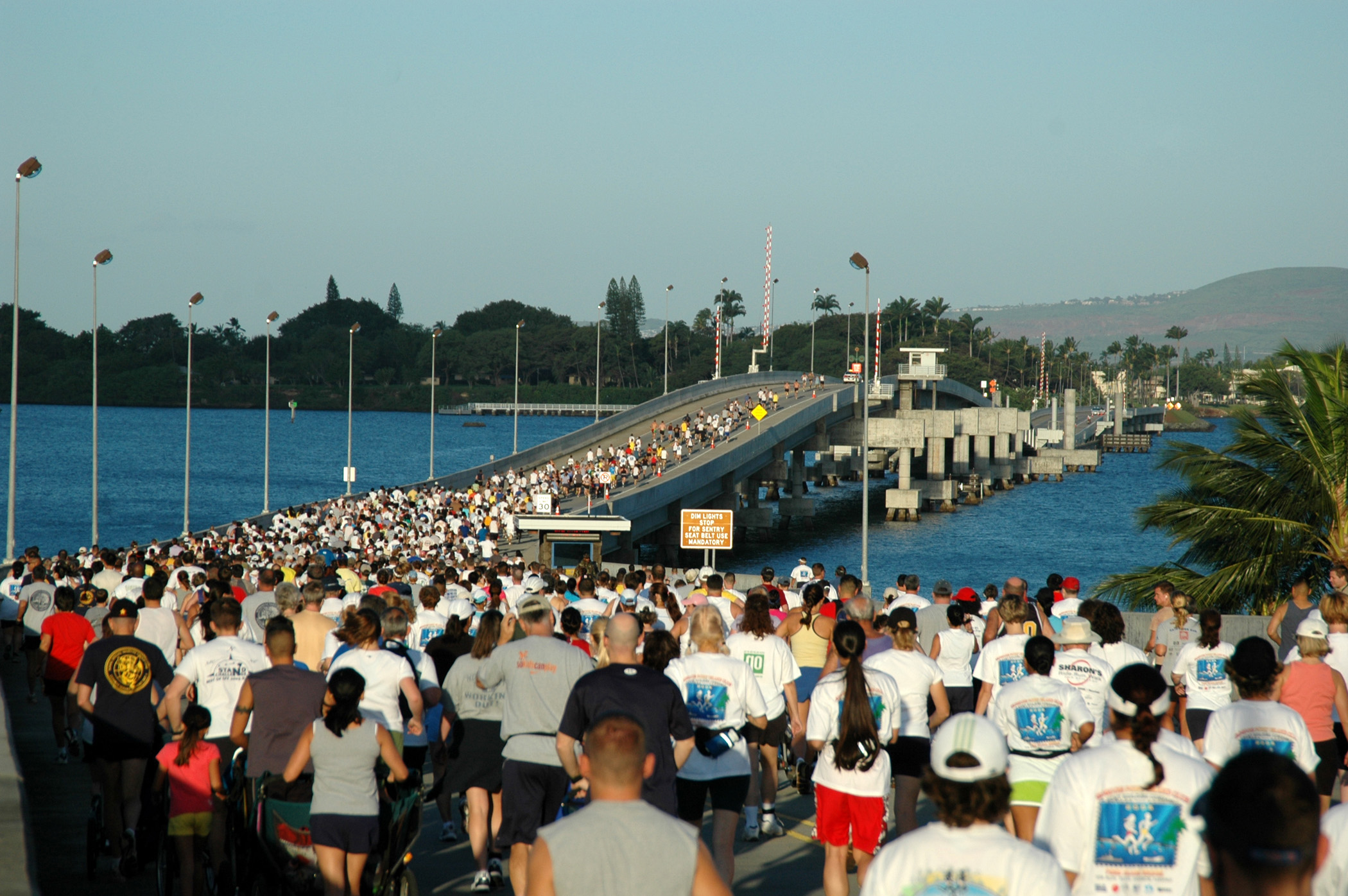
More than 1,400 military and civilian runners make their way across the Adm. Bernard "Chick" Clarey Bridge during the 2006 Ford Island 10k Bridge Run at Pearl Harbor.

Initially called "the bridge to nowhere", the Admiral Clarey Bridge was instrumental in Senator Daniel Inouye's "rebirth" of Ford Island and enabled over $500 million in development with special legislation (2814 US Code). It connected 45 families and 3,000 civilian workers to Kamehameha Highway, and visitor access enabled construction of the $50 million 16-acre (6.5 ha) Pacific Aviation Museum. Plans included 500 homes for Navy personnel, a child-development center and a Navy lodge.

In planning the island's development, the Navy considered its operational needs and the island's historic value. However, the National Trust for Historic Preservation considered the Navy's communication style more directive rather than collaborative, restricting the NTHP's ability to share their concerns, and in 2001 designated Ford Island one of its 11 most-endangered sites. Although the Navy's plans included preserving important hangars, the control tower and seaplane ramps, they failed to protect the existing runway and 1920s housing and did not address preserving bullet holes on the seaplane ramps. As hoped by the Trust, after the designation the Navy agreed to delay development of some of these items until an agreement could be reached.

To accommodate additional facilities and housing, the Navy needed to upgrade the island's infrastructure. Its sewage system was upgraded with the 2001 installation of a 6,000-foot (1,800 m), 20-inch (510 mm) sewage main from the island to Pearl Harbor and improvements to the sewage-pumping station. Due to the bridge's unique design, which includes a floating section, it was impossible to use it to transit cable across the loch. In 2005, the Navy contracted drilling for primary and auxiliary conduits 20 feet (6.1 m) apart and parallel to the bridge from Halawa Landing to the Ford Island golf course. The contractor installed 5,045-foot (1,538 m)-long, 24-inch (610 mm)-thick carbon-steel high-magnetic casing conduits, and fiber-optic communications cables and 46 kV power lines were fed through them.

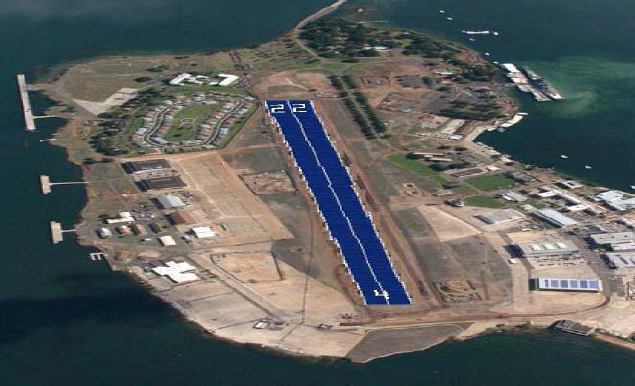
Conceptual design for photovoltaic panels covering the Ford Island runway

In June 2013 the Navy planned to install 60,000 photovoltaic panels over 28 acres (11 ha) on the Ford Island runway, to comply with Congressional and Defense Department mandates to reduce dependence on fossil fuels and offset the cost of Hawaiian energy (the highest in the United States). This plan deviated from a 2009 proposal (using the panels to define the runway) in favor of panels producing twice the power. The Navy offered the Pacific Aviation Museum Pearl Harbor $250,000 toward renovation of the control tower's elevator in exchange for its support of the plan. The museum declined, organizing an internet campaign opposing the plan based on the runway's historic significance and highlighting Ford Island's role in the attack on Pearl Harbor and Amelia Earhart's visit. In response, the Navy decided to install the panels on existing structures around Pearl Harbor.

=== Present use ===
Ford Island continues to be used by the US Navy. It hosts the 34,000-square-foot (3,200 m^{2}) Pacific Warfighting Center for exercises, training and battle simulations. The Admiral Clarey Bridge enabled the Navy to develop a $331 million Pacific tsunami warning center named after Senator Daniel Inouye, replacing the aging facility on ʻEwa Beach. The center's location is controversial because of its location in a tsunami-vulnerable area and the Navy's tsunami-evacuation plan calls for the island's only access point—the Admiral Clarey Bridge—to be opened for ship evacuation (making the bridge inaccessible to land vehicles). The island also continues to host a military brig.

Nominally based in Alaska, the Sea-based X-band Radar (SBX-1) arrived on Ford Island in 2006 for maintenance and repairs and has returned several times since. Primarily used as a warhead-detection radar system on a self-propelled floating platform in the Pacific, its presence on the island has been controversial. The platform, with a cost reaching nearly US$1 billion, has never actually made it to Alaska and conspiracy theorists argue that the platform is a mobile version of the High Frequency Active Auroral Research Program – which they have decided is capable of weather manipulation and mind control.

In 2013, the Navy unveiled a $4-million training facility, using simulators and virtual reality, at the Naval Undersea Warfare Center Division Keyport on Ford Island. The Fleet Integrated Synthetic Training/Testing Facility (FIST2FAC) was developed to save on training costs with a reusable facility which could emulate electronic, mine and anti-air warfare scenarios instead of real-world training requiring fuel, logistics and deployment costs for ships.

== Memorials and museums ==
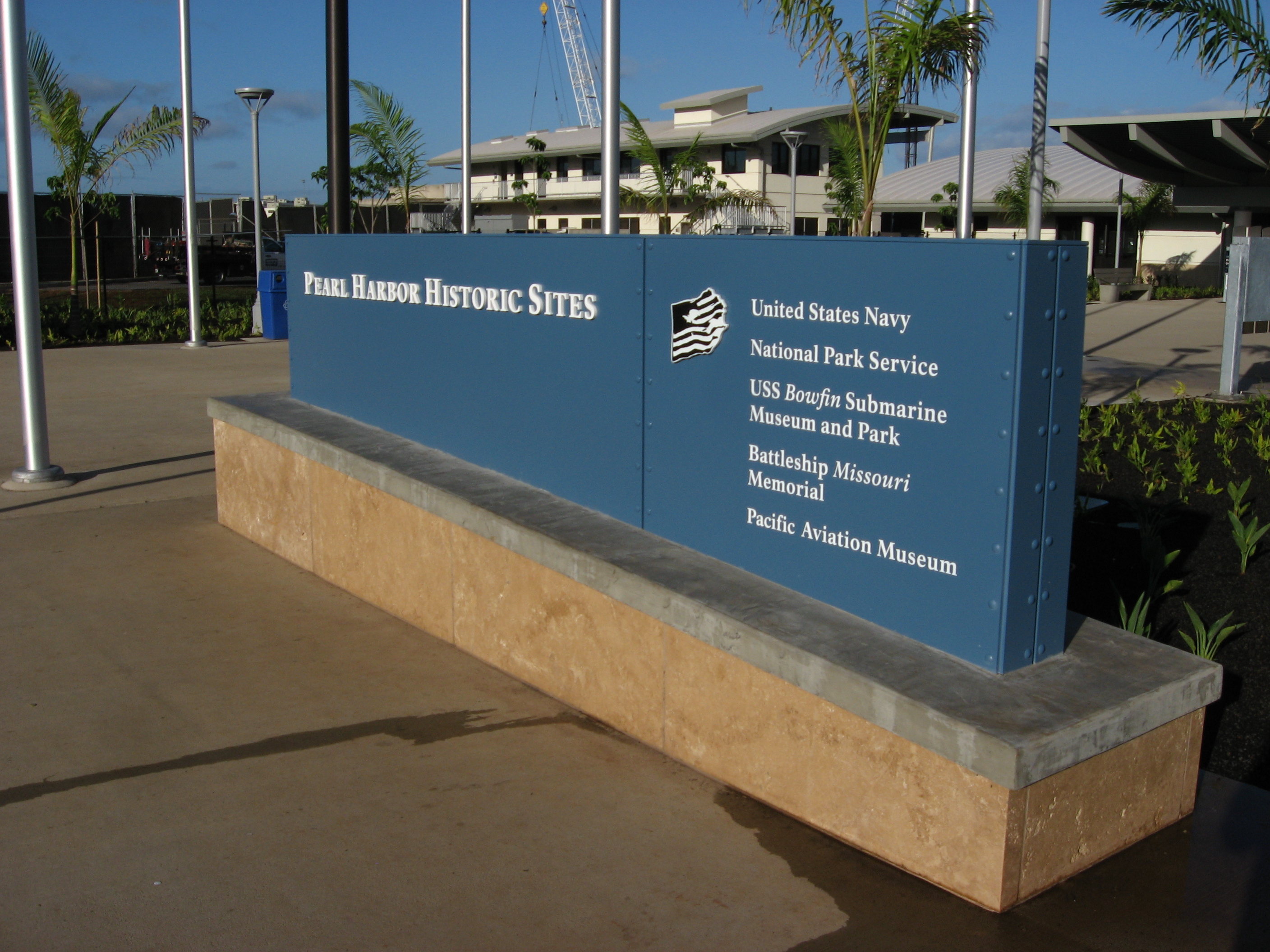
Sign in front of the Pearl Harbor Historic Sites at Halawa Landing on Oʻahu

Soon after the attack on Pearl Harbor, it was decided that USS Arizona would remain at the bottom of the harbor as the final resting place for those lost. In 1958, President Dwight D. Eisenhower approved the construction of a memorial over the vessel and the USS Arizona memorial was dedicated in 1962. It includes a complex at Halawa Landing (opposite Ford Island) and a structure over Arizona which receives visitors by ferry. Although the ferries are operated by US Navy personnel, the complex is staffed by the National Park Service.

On January 29, 1964, the navy facility in Pearl Harbor centering on the Ford Island was designated "United States Naval Base, Pearl Harbor" and became a National Historic Landmark. Six chief petty officer bungalows on the island are part of Pearl Harbor National Memorial.

The battleship USS Utah, which had been relegated to a target ship, remains submerged off the island. After salvaging the capsized USS Oklahoma with winching cables, the Navy unsuccessfully tried to recover Utah using the same technique. In 1972, the remains of Utah (on the northwest side of the island) were dedicated as a memorial to the fifty-eight men still inside.

Despite concern that it would detract from the Arizona memorial, in 1998 USS Missouri was transferred from Washington State to Ford Island. After a year of conversion into a museum, the ship opened for visitors on January 29, 1999. On December 7, 2006, the 65th anniversary of the attack on Pearl Harbor, the aviation museum opened to visitors in Hangar 37 after more than ten years of planning. On December 7, 2007, a joint ceremony was held by the National Park Service and the USS Oklahoma memorial committee to dedicate a memorial to the ship just outside the entrance to the USS Missouri museum on the northeast side of the island. The Pacific Aviation Museum Pearl Harbor signed a lease with the US Navy on September 2, 2010, for the Ford Island control tower, which sent the first radio alert of the attack, and began its restoration.

== Film and television ==
A 1965 film, In Harm's Way starring John Wayne, was filmed on Ford Island. A fictionalized scene before the attack, with officers and their wives at a pool party, was reenacted by island residents on the anniversary of the attacks as late as 2001. In 1970, the island's control tower was repainted for the filming of Tora! Tora! Tora!. A Boeing B-17 Flying Fortress used in the production experienced a landing-gear malfunction and crash-landed on Ford Island, and the crash landing was included in the film.

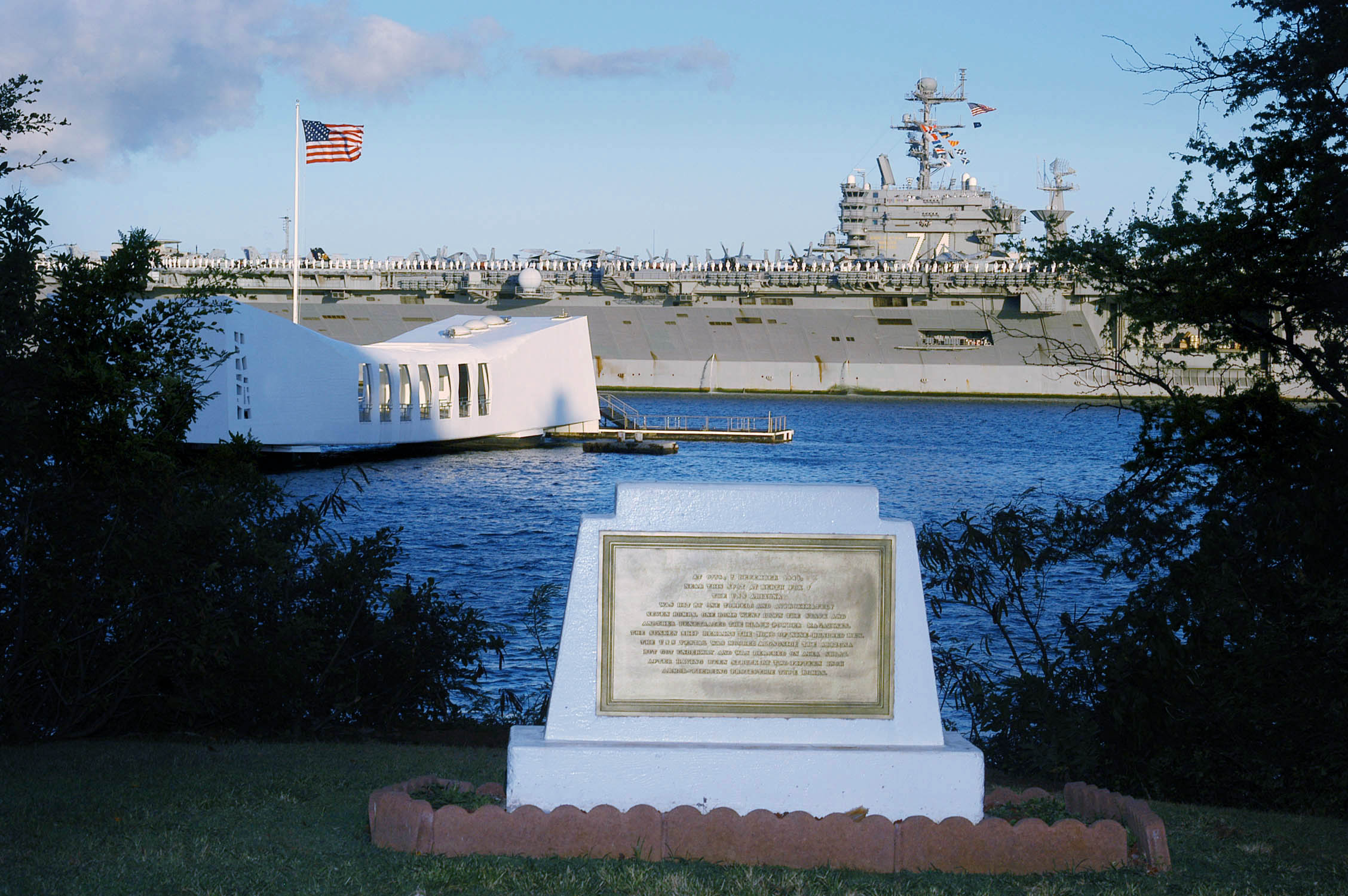
Memorial plaque on Ford Island, facing the USS Arizona memorial (aircraft carrier USS John C. Stennis can be seen in the background)

In April 2000, filming began on the Michael Bay film Pearl Harbor. Before the filming, the cast and crew gathered on the USS Arizona memorial for a wreath-laying by a representative of Touchstone Pictures, Jerry Bruckheimer and Bay. The producers brought fifteen vintage planes to Ford Island, placing them in one hangar for the filming. In addition, they brought fifteen ships back to Pearl Harbor for live bombardment (without sinking them). The operations room of the control tower was converted into a barracks for the filming. The Pacific Aviation Museum hoped that the film would increase public awareness of the tower and spur support for its restoration. Bay reflected on the historic significance of Ford Island: "I have a vivid memory of showing the crew around Ford Island during pre-production. We came upon a plaque directly across from the sunken Arizona, marking the spot where a torpedo hit nearly six decades ago. My crew stood in silence for three minutes at the sight of this small monument. It was a solemn moment for all of us, and I think it helped the crew appreciate the undertaking were [sic] about to begin." During filming, a Vultee BT-13 Valiant used as a torpedo bomber crashed on the island.

In 2010, the television series Hawaii Five-0 chose Battleship Cove, a housing community just outside the dock of the USS Missouri museum, as the location for an episode. The episode, with police cars racing down Tennessee and Nevada Streets, featured a number of Ford Island homes and some residents appeared as extras. That year, Peter Berg featured USS Missouri in the film Battleship. The ship, which was towed off Ford Island for maintenance, was brought out to sea between completion of the maintenance and its return to the dock for filming. Michael Carr, president of the Battleship Missouri Memorial, hoped that the film would spike the number of visitors to the Ford Island museum.

== See also ==
- Hawaiian Islets – The state of Hawaii counts 137 "islands" in the Hawaiian chain.
- List of documentation of Pearl Harbor Naval Base by the Historic American Buildings Survey and the Historic American Engineering Record
- List of islands of Hawaii
- National Register of Historic Places listings in Oahu
- Rabbit Island – an uninhabited islet located 0.75 mi (1.21 km) off Kaupo- Beach, near Makapuʻu at the eastern end of the Island of Oʻahu
- Naval Base Hawaii

== Bibliography ==
- Allen, Gwenfread E. (1999). Hawaii's War Years 1941–1945. Hawaii: Pacific Monograph. ISBN 0-9629227-2-2.
- Burlingame, Burl (2013). I'll Fly to Hawaii — A Century of Aviation. Hawaii: Pacific Monograph. ISBN 978-0-9629227-6-3.
- Cantor, Joanna; Fodor's Travel Publications, Inc (August 26, 2008). Linda Cabasin (ed.). Hawai'i 2009. New York: Random House LLC. ISBN 978-1-4000-1943-4.
- Cohen, Stan (1981). East Wind Rain. Montana: Pictorial Histories Publishing Company. ISBN 0-933126-15-8.
- Curtis, Catherine (1966). Builders of Hawaii. Hawaii: The Kamehameha Schools Press. ASIN B00285NRCI.
- Day, Arthur G. (1960). Hawai'i and its People. Hawaii: Booklines Hawaii Limited. ISBN 1-56647-705-0.
- Deerr, Noel (1949). The History of Sugar, Volume 1. London: Chapman and Hall Ltd. OCLC 833266489.
- Dorrance, William H. (1998). Oʻahu's Hidden History. Taiwan: Mutual Publishing. ISBN 1-56647-211-3.
- Dorrance, William H.; Francis S. Morgan (2000). Sugar Islands: The 165-year Story of Sugar in Hawai'i. Taiwan: Mutual Publishing. ISBN 1-56647-503-1.
- Doughty, Andrew (2010). Oahu Revealed (3 ed.). Hawaii: Wizard Publications Inc. ISBN 978-0-9814610-2-1. LCCN 2009930072.
- Dye, Bob (January 1, 1997). Merchant Prince of the Sandalwood Mountains: Afong and the Chinese in Hawai'i. Hawaii: University of Hawaii Press. ISBN 978-0-8248-1772-5. Archived from the original on October 30, 2023.
- Gast, Ross H.; Francisco de Paula Marín (1937). Don Francisco de Paula Marín: The Letters and Journal of Francisco de Paula Marín. Hawaii: University Press of Hawaii. ISBN 978-0-8248-0220-2. Archived from the original on October 30, 2023.
- Hastedt, Glenn P., ed. (2010). Spies, Wiretaps, and Secret Operations: An Encyclopedia of American Espionage. California: ABC-CLIO. ISBN 978-1-85109-808-8.
- Ka-ne, Herb K. (1997). Ancient Hawai'i. Hawai'i: The Kawainui Press. ISBN 0-943357-02-0.
- La Forte, Robert S.; Ronald E. Marcello, eds. (1991). Remembering Pearl Harbor. Delaware: Scholarly Resources Inc. ISBN 0-8420-2371-2.
- Lee, William S. (1966). The Islands. Michigan: Holt, Rinehart and Winston. OCLC 614607447.
- MacLeod, Roy M.; Philip F. Rehbock (January 1994). Darwin's Laboratory: Evolutionary Theory and Natural History in the Pacific. Hawaii: University of Hawaii Press. ISBN 978-0-8248-1613-1. Archived from the original on October 30, 2023.
- Prange, Gordon W.; Donald M. Goldstein; Katherine V. Dillon (1988). Dec 7. 1941: The Day the Japanese Attacked Pearl Harbor. New York: Anne Prange and Prange Enterprises. ISBN 0-07-050682-5.
- Pratt, Helen G. (1939). In Hawaii: A Hundred Years. New York: Charles Scribner's Sons. OCLC 12372595.
- Roberts, Michael D. (2000). Dictionary of American Naval Aviation Squadrons. Vol. 2. Washington D.C.: Naval Historical Center Department of the Navy. ASIN B00TNBDBDK. Archived from the original on March 30, 2020.
- Sterling, Elspeth P.; Catherine C. Summers (1978) [1962]. Sites of Oahu. Hawaii: Bishop Museum. ISBN 0-910240-73-6.
