= Masters (surname) =

Masters is a surname. Notable people with the surname include:

== Persons ==
- A. J. Masters (1950–2015), American country music singer
- Alexander Masters, author, screenwriter and worker with the homeless
- Anthony Masters (1919–1990), British production designer and set decorator
- Ben Masters (1947–2023), American actor
- Bettie Sue Masters (born 1937), American biochemist
- Billy Masters (disambiguation)
- Blake Masters, American venture capitalist and political candidate
- Blake Masters (screenwriter), American writer, director, and producer of films and television series
- Blythe Masters (born 1969), economist and current head of global commodities at J.P. Morgan Chase
- Brian Masters (born 1939), British writer
- Brian Masters (bishop) (1932–1998), Church of England bishop
- Charles Harcourt Masters (1789–1866), English surveyor and architect in Bath
- Chris Masters (born 1983), American professional wrestler, whose real name is Chris Mordetzky
- David Masters (born 1978), English cricketer
- Dru Masters (born 1965), British composer, best known for composing television music
- Edgar Lee Masters (1868–1950), American poet
- Edith Master (1932–2013), American equestrian
- Enias D. Masters (1815–1875), American politician in Wisconsin
- Ernest Masters (1899–1918), British military aviator
- Geoff Masters (born 1950), former Australian tennis player
- Gerald Masters (1955–2007), musician, solo artist and songwriter, achieving fame during the late seventies and early eighties
- Gil Masters, professor of Civil and Environmental Engineering (emeritus) at Stanford University
- Grant Masters, English actor.
- Hilary Masters (1928–2015), American writer
- Ian Masters (journalist), Australian-born, BBC-trained American broadcast journalist, commentator, author, screenwriter and documentary filmmaker
- Ian Masters (songwriter) (born 1964), multi-instrumentalist/songwriter/producer
- Isabell Masters (1913–2011), perennial third-party candidate (Looking Back Party) for President of the United States
- Jack Masters (born 1931), former Canadian politician
- James M. Masters, Sr. (1911–1988), United States Marine Corps lieutenant general
- James Masters (Gaelic footballer) (born 1982), Irish sports-person
- Jamie Masters (born 1955), retired Canadian professional ice hockey player
- Jeff Masters, American meteorologist and co-founder of the Weather Underground weather service
- John Masters (1914–1983), English officer in the British Indian Army and novelist
- Joshua Masters (born 1995), English squash player
- Josiah Masters (1763–1822), United States Representative from New York
- Kent Masters King (born 1974), American actress appearing on the daytime soap opera General Hospital
- Kristyn Masters, American bioengineer
- Lavinia Masters, American activist
- Marie Masters (born 1941), American actress
- Mark Masters, American radio company owner
- Mark Masters (musician) (born 1957), American jazz trumpeter, composer and arranger
- Martha Masters, American classical guitarist
- Maxwell T. Masters (1833–1907), English botanist and taxonomist
- Michael G. Masters, US homeland security expert
- Mike Masters (disambiguation)
- Oksana Masters (born 1989), Ukraine-born American Paralympic athlete
- Olga Masters (1919–1986), Australian journalist, novelist and short story writer
- Dr Peter Masters, Minister of the Metropolitan Tabernacle (Spurgeon's)
- Read Masters (1900–1967), New Zealand rugby player
- Richard Masters (disambiguation)
  - Richard George Masters (1877–1963), English recipient of the Victoria Cross
- Robert Masters (Wisconsin pioneer) (c.1787–1867), founder of Jefferson, Wisconsin
- Robert Masters (historian) (1713–1798), was an English clergyman and academic
- Robert Masters (New Zealand politician) (1879–1967), New Zealand politician of the Liberal Party, and a cabinet minister
- Roger Masters (born 1933), the Nelson A. Rockefeller Professor of Government Emeritus and research professor in the Department of Government at Dartmouth
- Roy Masters (commentator) (1928–2021), English radio commentator and author
- Roy Masters (sport) (born 1941), Australian rugby league coach, sport administrator and sports journalist
- Sammy Masters (1930–2013), American rockabilly musician
- Scott Masters, American gay pornographic film director and studio owner
- Steve Masters (disambiguation), various people
- Walt Masters (1907–1992), former MLB pitcher and an American football halfback and quarterback in the National Football League
- William Masters (1887 – 1983), birth name of the British-Argentine jazz musician Gordon Stretton
- William Masters (1915–2001), American gynaecologist and sexologist
- William Masters (politician), (1820–1906), American politician
- Zeke Masters, alias of Ron Goulart (1933–2022), American popular culture historian and author

== Fictional characters ==
- Tony Masters, fictional character in the HBO drama Oz played by Steven Wishnoff
- Alicia Masters, supporting character to the Marvel Comics superheroes the Fantastic Four and Silver Surfer
- Ken Masters, video game character from the Street Fighter series
- Martha Masters (House) PhD, fictional character in the Fox medical drama House
- Robin Masters, fictional character on the American television series Magnum, P.I.
- Vladimir "Vlad" Masters, one of the main antagonists of Danny Phantom
- Meg Masters, fictional character on the CW television series "Supernatural"

== See also ==
- Master (disambiguation)
- Marsters (surname)
- Meister (surname)
- Maistre (surname)
- Maitre (surname)
