= Master =

Master, master's or masters may refer to:

== Ranks, titles, and occupations ==
=== Arts and entertainment ===
- Master of ceremonies, or MC (emcee), the host of an official public or private staged event or other performance
- Old Master, a term for a recognized Western painter active before circa 1800
- Maestro, an orchestral conductor, or the master within some other musical discipline

=== Education ===
- Master (college), head of a college
- Master's degree, a postgraduate or sometimes undergraduate degree in the specified discipline
- Schoolmaster or master, presiding officer of a school

=== Marine or naval ===
- Master (naval), a former naval rank
- Master mariner, a licensed mariner qualified to be a sea captain in the merchant marine
- Master or shipmaster, the sea captain of a merchant vessel
- Master-at-arms, a naval police officer, often addressed as "Master" in the Royal Navy

=== Other ranks or titles ===
- Master (form of address), an English honorific for boys and young men
- Master (judiciary), a judicial official in the courts of common law jurisdictions
- Master (Peerage of Scotland), the male heir-apparent or heir-presumptive to a title in the Peerage of Scotland
- Master craftsman, in medieval guilds
- Station master, formerly the person in charge of railway stations
- Slave master, an owner of victims of slavery

== Arts and media ==
=== Fictional characters ===
- Master (Manos), the head villain in the horror movie Manos: The Hands of Fate
- Masters (The Tripods), a fictional race of beings in John Christopher's The Tripods trilogy
- Master (Buffy the Vampire Slayer), a recurring villain in the fantasy television series Buffy the Vampire Slayer
- Master (Master and Margarita), from the Mikhail Bulgakov novel
- The Master (Doctor Who), a recurring villain in the science fiction television series Doctor Who
- The Master (Fallout), in the 1997 video game Fallout
- The Master, a nickname for Ancient One (Marvel Comics)
- The Master, the player's character in the Nintendo game series ActRaiser
- The Master, an optional three-time boss Toad Sensei in Paper Mario
- The Master, a title character in the novel The Master and Margarita
- The Master, the main (and mostly absent) villain from Power Rangers Mystic Force
- The Master, from the Adult Swim television series The Venture Bros.
- The Master, in the manga series Uzaki-chan Wants to Hang Out!

=== Films ===
- Master (1997 film), an Indian Telugu-language film
- Master (2016 film), a South Korean film
- Master (2021 film), an Indian Tamil-language film
- Master (2022 film), an American film
- The Master (1980 film), a Hong Kong film
- The Master (1992 film), a Hong Kong film
- The Master (2005 film), a Polish film
- The Master (2009 film), a Turkish film
- The Master (2012 film), an American film
- The Master (2015 film), a Chinese film
- The Master (2016 film), an animated Lego short
- Masters (film), a 2011 Indian Malayalam-language film

=== Literature ===
- The Master (novel), a 2004 novel by Colm Tóibín
- The Masters (novel), a 1951 novel in the Strangers and Brothers sequence by C. P. Snow
- The Master: An Adventure Story, a 1957 science fiction novel for children by T. H. White
- The Master of Go, a 1951 novel by Yasunari Kawabata
- The Master, an 1895 best-selling novel by Israel Zangwill
- The Master, a 2021 biography of Roger Federer by Christopher Clarey

=== Music and audio ===
==== Performers ====
- Master (American band), a Czech-American death metal band
- Master (Russian band), a Russian thrash metal band
- Bojan Adamič (1912–1995), known as Master, Slovene composer of jazz, song festival and film music

==== Albums ====
- The Master (1961–1984), a box set album by Marvin Gaye
- The Master... (Pepper Adams album) (1980)
- The Master (Stan Getz album), recorded 1975, released 1982
- The Master (Jimmy Raney album) (1983)
- The Masters, a 1998 compilation album by The Stranglers
- The Master (Rakim album) (1999)
- Master, a popular designation for Yeah Yeah Yeahs (EP), a 2001 record by Yeah Yeah Yeahs
- The Master, a 2010 box set by Ravi Shankar

==== Film soundtracks ====
- Master (soundtrack), 2020 soundtrack album to the 2021 Tamil-language film Master
- Master (score), 2021 film score to the 2021 Tamil-language film Master

==== Other uses in music and audio ====
- Mastering (audio), a process resulting in a master recording, also known as a master, master copy, or master tape
- Master (audio drama), in the Doctor Who series (2003)
- "Master Song", a song on Songs of Leonard Cohen

=== Television ===
- The Master (American TV series), a 1984 American television series starring Lee Van Cleef that aired on NBC
- The Master (Australian game show), a 2006 Australian quiz show that aired on Seven Network
- The Master (Indonesian TV series), a 2009 Indonesian magic show television series

=== Other uses in arts and media ===
- The Master (The Doctor Who Role Playing Game), a 1985 supplement for the role-playing game
- Master recordings, the original of a visual or sound recording
- Master System, an 8-bit cartridge-based video game console

== People ==
- The Master (born 1970), Masami Hirosaka, Japanese radio-controlled racer
- The Master (1937–2010), ring name of King Curtis Iaukea, wrestler
- The Master (born 1954), nickname of Vietnamese-American poker player Men Nguyen
- Masters (surname)

== Schools ==
- Master's Academy & College, Canadian school in Calgary, Alberta
- Masters School, an American independent school in New York

== Sport ==
- Masters Tournament, known as The Masters, one of the four men's golf major championships
- ATP World Tour Finals, the season-ending tournament on the ATP tour known in the past as The Masters (derived from 'Masters Grand Prix' and subsequently 'Tennis Masters Cup')
- Senior sport, a competition age classification used by many sports for older athletes
  - Masters athletics, competition in the sport of athletics by older athletes
  - Masters cycling, competition in cycling by older athletes
  - Masters Football, six-a-side indoor football competition in UK for older athletes
  - Masters Rugby League, a derivative of rugby league for semi-retired and non-competitive players and officials
  - Masters swimming, competition in swimming by older athletes
- Masters (curling), an annual Grand Slam of Curling event
- Masters Cup (disc golf), an annual event on the disc golf PDGA tour
- PDC World Masters, a darts tournament in the Professional Darts Corporation
- Masters (snooker), professional invitational snooker tournament
- USBC Masters, professional ten-pin bowling tournament
- World Masters (darts), professional darts tournament

== Technology ==
=== Vehicles ===
- Alenia Aermacchi M-346 Master, an Italian military transonic trainer aircraft
- Miles Master, a British 2-seat training aircraft during the Second World War
- Renault Master, a van

=== Other technology ===
- MASTER, a Russian network of telescopes
- Master (software), pseudonym AlphaGo, an artificial intelligence Computer Go program
- Master–slave (technology), a model of communication
- Master System, an 8-bit cartridge-based video game console
- BBC Master, an 8-bit home computer produced by Acorn Computers

== Other uses ==
- Master, Iran, a village in Markazi Province, Iran
- Master Lock, a brand of padlock
- Master/slave (BDSM), consensual role-playing in a sexual relationship
- Masters Home Improvement, a former Australian hardware retailer
- Banco Master, a Brazilian financial institution

== See also ==
- Grandmaster (disambiguation)
- Maestro (disambiguation)
- Master/Slave (disambiguation)
- Master of the Universe (disambiguation)
- Meister (surname)
- Metal Master (disambiguation)
- Miss (disambiguation)
- Mister (disambiguation)
- Mistress (disambiguation)
- Marsters (surname)
- Standard (metrology), a master reference for measurements
