= Wild card (sports) =

Non-qualifier place in a tournament

A wild card (also wildcard or wild-card and also known as an at-large berth or at-large bid) is an invitation to a tournament or a playoff berth awarded to a team or individual that does not qualify via an automatic bid. In some events, wildcards are chosen freely by the organizers. Other events have fixed rules. Some North American professional sports leagues compare the records of teams which did not qualify directly by winning a division or conference.

== International sports ==
In international sports, the term is perhaps best known in reference to two sporting traditions: team wildcards distributed among countries at the Olympic Games and individual wildcards given to some tennis players at every professional tournament (both smaller events and the major ones such as Wimbledon). Tennis players may even ask for a wildcard and get one if they want to enter a tournament on short notice.

For Summer Olympic Games, some National Olympic Committees, whose nations are underrepresented after qualifications, may be granted wild card quotas, which are termed Universality Places, in some eligible sports. In Olympic and World Championship competitions in track and field and swimming, however, nations are automatically allowed to enter two competitors, so these instances are technically not wildcards. In some other Olympic sports, such as judo, archery, and badminton, wildcards are in use, and they are granted by the respective sport federations. On rare occasions, a competitor who had gained entry by wildcard succeeds in winning a medal or the championship. For example, Kye Sun-Hui won gold in judo at the 1996 Summer Olympics, Ding Junhui won the 2005 China Open snooker championship, Goran Ivanišević won the 2001 Wimbledon Championships, Kim Clijsters won the 2009 US Open, and Lin Dan won the 2013 BWF World Championships.

== North America ==
In North American professional sports leagues, "wild card" refers to a team that qualifies for the championship playoffs without winning their specific conference or division outright. The number of wild card teams varies. In most cases, the rules of the league call for the wild card team to survive an extra round or to play the majority of their postseason games away from home. Although the exact rules among the leagues differ, they all generally agree that the wild card team (or teams, as in MLB, NFL, and NHL) are the ones with the best records among the teams that did not win their divisions; these teams usually finish as the runner-up to their division winners.

The term "wild card" does not apply to postseason formats where a set number of teams per division qualify. Former examples include: the American Football League's 1969 playoffs (qualifying the top two finishers from each division), the National Basketball Association's 1967-through-1970 playoffs (top four finishers from each division) and 1971–1972 playoffs (top two finishers in each division), and the National Hockey League's 1968–1974 and 1982–1993 playoffs (top four finishers from each division) are not true wild card formats. When a wild card playoff format is used, the number of teams in a division that qualify is not fixed; a set number of teams from each division automatically qualify(ies), but (an) additional team(s) also qualify(ies), based either on league record or conference record.

=== Major League Baseball ===
In Major League Baseball (MLB), the wild card teams are the three teams in each of the two leagues (American and National) that have qualified for the postseason despite failing to win their division. Those teams in each league possess the three best winning percentages in their league after the three division winners.

The wild card was instituted in MLB in 1994, but implemented for the first time in 1995, after both leagues reorganized into three divisions, with one wild card team per league advancing to the Division Series along with the three division winners. In 2012, the system was modified to add a second wild card team per league and pit each league's wild card teams against each other in a play-in game – the MLB Wild Card Game – the winner of which would then advance to the Division Series and play the division winner with the best record. The two teams with the best records outside of the division champions advanced to the wild card game. The system was changed again in 2022 to add a third wild card team from each league, along with replacing the play-in game with two three-game series in each league. The division winner with the worst record in each league would now play in the wild card round, while the other two division winners would continue to have a bye.

==== Wild card World Series champions ====
- 1997 Florida Marlins
- 2002 Anaheim Angels
- 2003 Florida Marlins
- 2004 Boston Red Sox
- 2011 St. Louis Cardinals
- 2014 San Francisco Giants
- 2019 Washington Nationals
- 2023 Texas Rangers

==== Other wild card World Series participants ====
- 2000 New York Mets
- 2002 San Francisco Giants
- 2005 Houston Astros
- 2006 Detroit Tigers
- 2007 Colorado Rockies
- 2014 Kansas City Royals
- 2022 Philadelphia Phillies
- 2023 Arizona Diamondbacks

=== National Football League ===
In the National Football League (NFL), since 2020, each of the two conferences sends three wild card teams along with four division champions to its postseason. The first round of the playoffs is called the "wild card round". In this round, each conference's division champion with the best regular-season record is awarded a first-round bye and granted automatic berth in the "Divisional Round". The four division champions are seeded from #1 through #4, while the three wild card teams are seeded #5 to #7; within these separations, seeding is by regular-season record. In the "wild card Round", the #7 team plays the #2 team, #6 plays #3, and #5 plays #4. In the "Divisional Round", the lowest-remaining seed plays the #1 seeded team, while the other two wild card winners face-off against each other, with the higher seed hosting. The higher-seeded teams have home-field advantage in both rounds and the "Conference Championships".

==== Background ====
The NFL was the first sports league to use the wild card format. The decision to implement a wild card coincided with the completion of the AFL-NFL merger in 1970. Prior to the merger, the right to compete in the postseason for the NFL title was restricted to division/conference champions. Until 1967, a tiebreaker game was played to resolve a deadlock for first place in either of the two conferences. When the league expanded to 16 teams that year, it realigned into four divisions and expanded the playoffs to two rounds. Tiebreaker games were eliminated in favor of the use of performance-based criteria to determine division champions.

The rival American Football League (AFL), which reached a final size of ten teams in two divisions, continued to restrict its postseason to division winners until the 1969 season, the AFL's last as a separate league. The change came largely in response to criticism from NFL loyalists following the New York Jets' upset win in Super Bowl III, who argued that the Jets had an "unfair" advantage since, having won the Eastern Division outright, they were the only pro team with a bye in the divisional round (the Western Division title having been determined by a traditional tiebreaker, played the same weekend as the NFL's divisional round, between the Kansas City Chiefs and the Oakland Raiders). The AFL later agreed to expand their playoffs to include division runners-up and implemented tiebreakers, thus in 1969 the runners-up played the winners of the opposite divisions for the right to contest the AFL Championship Game. The Chiefs, despite being AFL West runners-up, nevertheless won the last Super Bowl prior to the merger.

In 1970, the merged league realigned into two conferences of thirteen teams each, with three "old-line" NFL teams joining the AFL teams in the American Football Conference (AFC), and the remaining NFL teams forming the National Football Conference (NFC). The decision to make the conferences equal in size meant they could not feasibly align into anything except three divisions of four or five teams in each conference. This led to a debate as to how the postseason of the merged league should be structured. Both the NFL and AFL playoff formats of 1969 had attracted fierce critics. The NFL format was criticized for its ability to cause a team tied for first overall in the league to miss the playoffs (this happened once, in 1967, when the Baltimore Colts missed the postseason despite a .917 winning percentage after losing a tiebreaker to the Los Angeles Rams). The AFL's 1969 playoffs were criticized by NFL purists for breaking with longstanding tradition, also, due to the fact that they allowed runners-up to qualify no matter how much disparity existed between the divisions, the AFL playoff structure could allow a mediocre team to qualify – this did occur when the Houston Oilers, a .500 team, finished second in the Eastern Division – the Oilers were throttled in the playoffs 56–7 by the Western champion Oakland Raiders.

Despite Kansas City's upset wins over the Raiders and Minnesota Vikings, some purists argued for the tradition of having only division champions contest the playoffs to continue. Had they prevailed, the post-merger NFL playoffs would have consisted of six teams and might have eventually evolved to closely resemble the playoffs of the modern Canadian Football League, with the regular season champion of each conference earning the right to host the championship game against the winner of a game between the champions of the other two divisions. However, the old-line NFL owners, who still expected their teams to dominate the merged league for at least the first half of the 1970s, thought a repeat of the 1967 Colts-Rams fiasco would be very likely under the new alignment combined with a six team format. Furthermore, the modern principle that home field advantage and byes should be awarded to the teams with the best records had still not yet been firmly established – tradition at the time dictated that home field advantage rotate between divisions and/or conferences regardless of record. In any event, most owners in both conferences wanted to keep the even four-team playoff field in each conference. This was established by having the three division champions in each conference joined by the best second-place finisher in the conference.

==== History ====
As with much of the NFL's nomenclature, the "wild card" was not initially referred to as such and was instead referred as the "Best Second-Place Team" (or sometimes simply as the "Fourth Qualifier"). The media, however, began referring to the qualifying teams as "wild cards". Eventually, the NFL officially adopted the term.

For the 1969 AFL playoffs, a "crossover" format was used such that the division winners played the runners up in the opposite division. This was done in part because division rivals had already played each other twice in the regular season and also in part because the AFL did not want the playoff games to be confused as "division championship games" – by keeping division rivals separate in the opening playoff round, the league left fans in no doubt that the regular season division winners were the only true division champions, even if a runner-up eventually won the league title. The NFL kept this principle in place by stipulating that a wild card team could never face its own division champion in the divisional round.

Following the implementation of the AFL–NFL merger prior to the 1970 season, from 1970 to 1974 the NFL used a rotation to determine which teams hosted playoff games, and which teams played which other teams.

From 1975 to 1977, the divisional playoffs featured the #1 seed hosting the "wild card" team, and the #2 seed hosting the #3 seed unless the #1 seed and wild card team were divisional rivals; in that case, the #1 seed hosted the #3 seed and the #2 seed hosted the wild card team. The "wild card" team in each conference was the team with the best record in its conference excluding the #1–3 seeds.

The number of wild card qualifiers was expanded to two per conference in 1978 – the divisional winners were granted a bye week while the wild card teams, seeded #4 and #5, played each other in a "wild card game" with the #4 seed having home field advantage. Since there were two wild card games, one per conference, the phrase "wild card round" came into use. During this time, the #1 seed hosted the winner of the #4 vs #5 wild card game, while the #2 seed played the #3 seed. However, the rule that teams from the same division could not play each other in the divisional round continued, so if the #1 seed and the winner of the #4 vs #5 wild card game were in the same division, then the #1 seed played the #3 seed, while the #2 seed played the #4 vs #5 winner.

To address the oddity of one wild card team per conference hosting a playoff game (albeit in an earlier round) while one division winner per conference did not automatically have the right to host a playoff game, the playoffs were expanded again to three wild cards per conference in 1990 (for 12 teams total) with the lowest-ranked divisional winner losing its bye but gaining the right to host a playoff game. Following the addition of the Houston Texans in 2002, the league added a fourth division to each conference. The league decided not to change the number of playoff teams, and thus the number of wild card qualifiers was reduced to two per conference. In 2020, the playoffs returned to three wild cards per conference, or 14 teams total. The term "Wild Card Round" continues to be used for the opening round of the playoffs, even though this round has involved both division winners and wild card teams since 1990.

As of the 2021–22 playoffs, there has never been a meeting of two wild card teams in the Super Bowl; the closest that came to happening was in the 2010–11 playoffs, when the Green Bay Packers and New York Jets went on Cinderella runs after finishing as the second wild card team in each of their conferences (the NFC and AFC, respectively); the Packers won the NFC Championship Game and went on to win the Super Bowl, while the Jets' Cinderella story ended with a one-score loss to the Steelers in the AFC Championship Game.

From 2002 to 2019, the only way a wild card team could host a playoff game within their respective conference (Super Bowls are considered neutral site games regardless of home venue) would be for both wild card teams to reach the Conference Championship Game by each winning two road playoff games:

- The No. 5 seeded wild card wins @ the No. 4 seeded division winner in the wild card Round and wins @ the No. 2 seeded division winner in the divisional round
- The No. 6 seeded wild card wins @ the No. 3 seeded division winner in the wild card Round and wins @ the No. 1 seeded division winner in the divisional round

The No. 5 seeded wild card would host the No. 6 seeded wild card in the Championship Game.

Since 2020, it has been possible for a wild card team to host a Divisional Round playoff game. This requires that all three wild card teams (seeded 5–7) win their wild card games on the road since teams are re-seeded. The matchups in the divisional round would be:

- The No. 7 seeded wild card @ the No. 1 seeded division winner
- The No. 6 seeded wild card @ the No. 5 seeded wild card

==== Wild card Super Bowl champions ====
- 1980–81: Oakland Raiders–Super Bowl XV
- 1997–98: Denver Broncos–Super Bowl XXXII
- 2000–01: Baltimore Ravens–Super Bowl XXXV
- 2005–06: Pittsburgh Steelers–Super Bowl XL
- 2007–08: New York Giants–Super Bowl XLII
- 2010–11: Green Bay Packers–Super Bowl XLV
- 2020–21: Tampa Bay Buccaneers–Super Bowl LV

==== Other wild card Super Bowl participants ====
- 1975–76: Dallas Cowboys-Super Bowl X
- 1985–86: New England Patriots–Super Bowl XX
- 1992–93: Buffalo Bills–Super Bowl XXVII
- 1999–2000: Tennessee Titans–Super Bowl XXXIV

The 1980 Raiders, 2005 Steelers, and 1992 Bills tied for first in their division but lost a tiebreaker.

While not a wild card team, the 1969 Kansas City Chiefs were the first non-division winner to win the Super Bowl. They finished second in the Western Division of the American Football League, and in that season, the last before the merger, the AFL went from having its two division winners meeting for the league title to adding a second round in which the second place team in each division qualified for the post-season. These teams played cross-division in the semifinal round. Thus the Chiefs, who finished second in the West, defeated the East Division champion New York Jets in the AFL semifinals and then defeated the West Division champion Oakland Raiders to advance to Super Bowl IV, where they beat the Minnesota Vikings. Because the term "wild card" was not instituted until the following year, the Chiefs are not included in the above list, but are recognized as the first team to win the Super Bowl without winning a division title.

=== National Basketball Association ===
Although the National Basketball Association (NBA) includes wild card teams in their playoff structures, the term "wild card" is seldom used; instead, each playoff team is most commonly denoted by its seeding position within the conference.

Before the 2006–07 NBA season, the NBA seeded its teams with the division winners automatically receiving seeds 1–3. Until 2015, the NBA seeded the three division winners and the wild card team with the best record by regular-season record. This meant that the wild card with the best record got a seed as high as #2 (if that team is in the same division as the team with the best record in the conference); however, the next four wild card teams were still limited to the #5 through #8 seeds. This change was made to ensure that the two best teams in each conference cannot meet until the conference final, and also (allegedly) to try and eliminate incentives for a playoff-bound team to deliberately lose games at the end of the regular season in order to "choose" a higher-seeded team that has won fewer games (and, due to the unique home-court rules of the NBA, possibly gain home-court advantage for that series).

The notion of "wild cards" was essentially abolished in the 2015–16 NBA season, as changes made prior to the season meant the top eight teams in each conference qualified regardless of divisional rank, with the seeded teams ranked by percentage. The only particular advantage to winning a division now was that a divisional title served as the first tiebreaker for qualification seeding purposes. Unlike some other leagues, there is no tie-breaker advantage at all to finishing in any divisional rank lower than first – meaning (for example) that while a division winner will automatically win a tie-breaker over another division's runner-up, a division runner-up will not automatically win a tie-breaker over teams finishing third, fourth or fifth in other divisions. The new format means it is possible for an especially weak division to send no teams (not even its champion) to the NBA playoffs. In the 2022–23 season, the Southeast Division champion Miami Heat did not qualify directly to the NBA playoffs but earned the no. 8 seed in the Eastern Conference through the play-in tournament, which is more fully described below. In the 2024–25 season, the Southeast Division champion Orlando Magic did not qualify directly to the NBA playoffs but earned the no. 7 seed in the Eastern Conference through the play-in tournament. It remains possible for an NBA division champion to miss the playoffs or miss the postseason, including the play-in tournament, altogether, but, as of the start of the 2025–26 season, this has not yet occurred.

In the NBA, the winner of the #1 vs. #8 series goes on to face the winner of the #5 vs. #4 series, while the winner of the #2 vs. #7 series faces the winner of the #6 vs. #3 series. The winner of the #1 vs. #8 series will usually play against a wild card team in the conference semifinals; this is arranged deliberately to reward the #1 seeded team by giving it the most winnable matchups in the first two rounds, although this is not always the case in event of an upset because the NBA never re-seed teams following the first round. For instance, if the #6 seed upsets the #3 seed and the higher seed wins the remaining first round matchups within the conference, the #1 seed would face the #4 seed, while the #2 seed would face the #6 seed in the conference semifinals.

As of the 2020–21 NBA season, the number of teams that qualified for the postseason expanded to ten teams per conference, and the NBA play-in tournament, which the league distinguishes from the NBA playoffs, was adopted in its current format, after a modified version was used the previous season due to the COVID-19 pandemic. This is similar to the first two rounds of the Page–McIntyre system for a four-team playoff. The #9 seed hosts the #10 seed in an elimination game. The #7 seed hosts the #8 seed in the double-chance game, with the winner advancing as the #7 seed. The loser of this game then hosts the winner of the elimination game between the 9th and 10th place teams to determine the #8 seed. The NBA's regular playoff format then proceeds as normal.

=== National Hockey League ===
In the National Hockey League (NHL), the first, second, and third place teams in each division qualify for the playoffs automatically, and two additional teams, regardless of divisional alignment, also qualify by having the best records among the remaining teams in the conference. These teams are referred to as the wild cards. In the first round, the division champions play the wild cards, while the second and third placed teams in each division play each other; therefore the bracket is fixed, like the NBA. Home-ice advantage is given to the higher seed in the first two rounds, with the better regular season record being used in the conference finals and Stanley Cup Final.

The NHL's current format is similar in some respects to the "cross-over rule" used by the Canadian Football League since 1997 in that it the format emphasizes intra-divisional ranking and brackets in the playoff structure and yet allows two teams from one division to qualify for the playoffs at the expense of the two teams finishing with worse records and in the same divisional ranks in another division. The main difference is that the CFL only allows the lowest ranked playoff qualifying team from a division to cross over into the other division's playoffs, whereas in the NHL it is possible for either wild card team to "cross over" to the other division, or even (in cases where four teams qualify from each division) for the wild card teams to swap divisional playoff brackets. Also, unlike the CFL the NHL does not require the second wild card qualifier to have an outright better record than a superior-ranked team in the other division – in the event of such a tie at the end of the NHL season standard tie-breaking procedures are used to determine playoff qualification.

From 1999 until 2013, three division champions within each conference were seeded no. 1 through no. 3, based on their regular-season records. Among the remaining teams within each conference, five additional teams with the best records are awarded seeds no. 4 through no. 8. The division champions (the first through third seeds) and the non-division winning team with the best record (fourth seed) were given home-ice advantage in the opening playoff series, in which they face the eighth-seeded through fifth-seeded teams, respectively. However, the playoff format differed slightly from that of the NBA. In the NHL, the highest-remaining seed of the first round played the lowest-remaining seed of the first round in the next round of the playoffs. For example, if the #1, #4, #6, and #7 seeds win their respective first round series, then the second round of the playoffs matched the #1 seed (highest) versus the #7 seed (lowest), and the #4 seed (2nd highest) versus the #6 seed (second lowest). Home-ice advantage in each NHL playoff series prior to the Stanley Cup Final was granted to the higher seed, even if the wild-card team had a better regular-season record. For the Final, the team with the better record receive home-ice advantage.

=== Major League Soccer ===
Major League Soccer (MLS) used a wild card format starting in its 2011 playoffs. The top three teams from each of its two conferences automatically qualified for the conference semifinals, while the four remaining teams with the highest point totals in league play, without regard to conference, earned "wild cards" into the playoffs. The wild card matches were single games, with the #7 seed hosting the #10 seed and the #8 seed hosting the #9 seed. The lowest surviving seed then played the Supporters' Shield winner (i.e., the team with the highest point total), while the other surviving wild card played the top seed in the other conference.

The playoff format was revamped for the 2012 season, with all seeding done entirely in-conference, therefore eliminating any true wild card qualifiers. From 2012 to 2018, the top six teams from each conference qualified for the playoffs, with the #1 & #2 seeds in each conference automatically qualifying for the conference semifinals, and seeds #3–6 in each conference being wild cards. The lowest-seeded winner (played between the #4 & #5, and #3 & #6 seeds) in each conference played the #1 seed, and the next-lowest played the #2 seed in the conference semifinals. In 2019, the playoffs were expanded to the top seven teams in each conference, with only the conference regular season champion receiving a first-round bye.

2023 and hereafter sees only the eighth seed hosting the ninth-seed while the top seven seeds earned a prelim-round byes. The playoffs had expanded to nine teams per conference.

=== Canadian championship curling ===
Curling Canada introduced wild card teams starting with the 2018 Scotties Tournament of Hearts and 2018 Tim Hortons Brier. The change was made as part of a wider set of changes which expanded the tournaments to 17 teams and eliminated the unpopular pre-qualifying tournaments. From 2018, the round robin stage of the Tournament of Hearts and Brier will consist of two seeded "pools" of eight teams as opposed to the old format consisting a single group of twelve teams. This allows the main tournament to include "Team Canada" (either the defending champions or, when the champions decline to or are unable to defend their title, the runners-up) and teams representing all fourteen constituent associations representing the ten provinces and three territories plus Northern Ontario. The remaining two participants in the tournament are the wild cards, which compete in an MLB-style play-in game prior to the main tournament to determine the sixteenth team in the main tournament. Just as is the case with MLB division titles, the format is designed to give teams an incentive to win their provincial championships. The wild cards are the top two teams in the Canadian Team Ranking System (CTRS) standings that did not win either the previous year's tournament or their respective provincial or territorial championship. The top ranked of these two teams receives the hammer (last rock) to start the game.

The CTRS standings are also used to determine the seeding of all teams in the main tournament, with one important caveat – for the purposes of seeding the round robin pools and so as to allow the main round robin schedule to be drawn up prior to the wild card game, the ranking of the top wild card team is the ranking that is used for seeding purposes regardless of who wins the game. Whereas teams in the Tournament of Hearts and Brier are traditionally referred to by their respective province or territory (other than Northern Ontario and Team Canada), the team that wins the wild card game is referred to as the "wild card" for the duration of the tournament. As is the case with Team Canada, the wild card retains that designation even if the team that is representing the same province or territory as the wild card team is eliminated prior to the wild card team.

With the introduction of pools, the round robin portion of the Tournament of Hearts and Brier now consists of two stages. The top four teams in each pool qualify for the second stage, formally known as the "Championship Pool." Unlike most tournaments which use a similar format, teams carry over their entire round robin records from the preliminary stage as opposed to only those results against teams that also qualify. This ensures that each Championship Pool team still plays eleven games that count for the purposes of determining playoff qualification.

The format is designed to ensure that a competitive team fills the wild card slot – due to the significant disparity in playing caliber between the top teams of Canada's fourteen member associations, it is widely expected that the wild card will consistently come from one of the provinces with the toughest fields in the playdowns, and that it will consistently be a championship contending team.

The format was changed for the 2021 curling season due to the COVID-19 pandemic. For at least that year, tournaments will expand to eighteen teams each. Three wild card teams will gain direct entry into the main draw, which expanded to pools of nine teams each. Additional wild card berths are granted if the defending champion does not play and/or a member association does not enter a team (this occurred, for example, in the 2024 Scotties Tournament of Hearts when Nunavut withdrew) As a result, teams that advance to the championship pool will play twelve round robin games instead of eleven. To accommodate the expanded round robin schedule, the playoffs will revert to the old three team, two game format thus eliminating the page playoff and quarter-final round.

Beginning in 2024 wild card teams are no longer designated "Wild Cards" in the draw or standings and have the right to represent their member associations on the same basis as the team advancing from playdowns.

=== Canadian Football League ===
While the Canadian Football League does not officially use the term "wild card" to denote any playoff qualifier, its crossover rule acts similar to a wild card in many respects.

Calls to change the CFL's playoff format came about soon after the CFL finished its evolution from two regional conferences, which were originally the Interprovincial Rugby Football Union in the East and the Western Interprovincial Football Union in the West. Although the CFL was officially founded in 1958, its constituent sections did not fully merge until 1981. At the time, it was agreed that three teams from each division would qualify, regardless of overall league standings. This quickly proved controversial, as a wide disparity in playing caliber had emerged between the East and West divisions. Since the league had also implemented a fully balanced schedule (each of the nine teams played each opponent once at home and once on the road), this disparity (made even worse by the fact the West had one more team than the East) was fully exposed in the standings – in each of the first three seasons of the new format, the fourth place team missed the playoffs with records as good as 9–7 in the West, while in the East records as bad as 3–13 were good enough for third place and a playoff berth. In 1981, even the fifth place Western team's record of 6–10 was good enough for outright possession of sixth place overall.

In 1986, the playoff format was changed. The new format the fourth place team in one division to qualify if it finished with an outright better record than the third place team in the other division. The Eastern owners agreed in exchange for expanding the schedule to 18 games, and also with a stipulation that the qualifying fourth-place team would stay in its own division for the playoffs. As a result, the change introduced the possibility of a four team bracket in one division and a two-game total point series in the other (the two game total point format was nothing new in Canadian football – it was commonly used until the early 1970s). It also introduced the possibility of the first place teams losing their traditional byes based on results elsewhere in the league. This occurred in 1986, when the 11–7 Calgary Stampeders qualified in place of the 4–14 Montreal Alouettes. The Alouettes folded before the start of the following season. Although it is highly questionable whether a 1986 playoff appearance would have saved the floundering Montreal franchise, the CFL quickly re-instated the traditional playoff format for the 1987 season. It also moved the Winnipeg Blue Bombers (the West's easternmost team) to the Eastern Division. This balanced the divisions both in numbers as well as, to a considerable extent, in playing caliber, and the reduction in teams also caused the schedule to be changed to emphasize more divisional games. As a result, the three top finishers of the two divisions finishers always had the six best league records from 1987 up until the start of the league's U.S. expansion experiment, which started in the 1993.

The current rule was adopted after the league re-activated the Alouettes and reverted to an all-Canadian alignment in 1996. It allows the fourth place team of one division to "cross over" and take the place of the third place team in the other divisional bracket, provided the fourth place team has more points (i.e. an outright better record) than the third place team. Since the cross over team enters as the third place team, it never receives home field advantage in the playoffs, even if its record is better than that of one or both of the qualifying teams in the other division.

As of 2023, all teams to qualify under this rule have crossed over from the Western Division to the Eastern bracket, although there have been a handful of occasions where a fourth placed Eastern team was in mathematical contention for a Western cross-over berth late in the season. Cross-over teams have advanced as far as the Eastern Final, but as of 2023 have never advanced to the Grey Cup game. There is no provision for a fifth placed team in one division to cross over in place of the other division's runner-up, even if it has a better record; in 2018 the Edmonton Eskimos finished fifth in the West with a 9–9 record and missed the playoffs while the Hamilton Tiger-Cats finished 8–10 and qualified as Eastern runners-up. Thus, it is theoretically possible (but it has not yet occurred) that all four Eastern Division teams could reach the playoffs, but not for all five Western Division teams.

== Professional tennis ==
In professional tennis tournaments, a wildcard refers to a tournament entry awarded to a player at the discretion of the organizers. All ATP and WTA tournaments have a few spots set aside for wildcards in both the main draw, and the qualifying draw, for players who otherwise would not have made either of these draws with their professional ranking. They are usually awarded to players from the home and/or sponsoring country (sometimes after a tournament where the winner is awarded the wildcard), promising young players, players that are likely to draw a large crowd, or have won the tournament earlier or players who were once ranked higher and are attempting a comeback (for instance, following a long-term injury). High-ranked players can also ask for a wildcard if they want to enter a non-mandatory tournament after the normal entry deadline; for example, because they lost early in another tournament. This means a wildcard player sometimes becomes the top seed.

The organizers of three of the Grand Slam tournaments —the Australian Open, French Open, and US Open— grant one wildcard nomination to each of the other two. Christopher Clarey described this practice as "nothing more than mutual back scratching" and "an outdated symbol of elitism".

=== Notable wildcards ===
- In 2001, Goran Ivanišević won the Wimbledon Men's Singles championships having been handed a wildcard entry by the organising All England Lawn Tennis and Croquet Club. At the time, he was ranked world No. 125 after a shoulder injury but had earlier reached the final three times.
- In 2009, Kim Clijsters won the US Open tournament, after receiving a wildcard entry. It was her first Grand Slam tournament since announcing her comeback to the sport, having first retired in 2007 to start a family. She was a former champion and world No. 1 but was unranked since she had only played two other tournaments (also on wildcards) since her comeback, and three were required to get a rank.
- In 2012, Jonathan Marray and Frederik Nielsen won the Wimbledon Men's Doubles after being selected as a wildcard. They had no significant results but Marray was a home player.
- In 2017, Maria Sharapova was granted a wildcard to play in the US Open. She was a former champion and had finished serving a 15-month doping ban earlier in the year.
- In 2019, 15-year-old Coco Gauff received a wildcard to play at the Wimbledon qualifying event, and advanced to the last 16 of the main draw.
- In 2019, Canadian teenager Bianca Andreescu became the first wildcard to win Indian Wells.
- In 2022, Thanasi Kokkinakis and Nick Kyrgios became the first wildcard men's doubles entry to win at the Australian Open.

== Motorsport ==
=== Motorcycle racing ===
In motorcycle racing the term 'wildcard' is used for competitors only involved in individual rounds of a championship, usually their local round. Local riders taking advantage of their local knowledge (often having raced that circuit on that bike before) and affording to take risks without planning for a championship, often upset established runners. Makoto Tamada and Shaky Byrne have both taken double victories in Superbike World Championship rounds in their home countries. The most famous wildcard entry perhaps was the late Daijiro Kato with finishing 3rd at his first appearance in 1996 and then winning the Japanese 250cc Grand Prix back to back in 1997 and 1998 on his way to become the most successful 250cc World Champion of all time in 2001.

Grand Prix motorcycle racing

Each Grand Prix host Federation (FMNR) may nominate 3 wildcard entries for the Moto3 and Moto2 classes in their own Grand Prix only.

The MSMA (Motorcycle Sport Manufacturers’ Association) may, at each event, nominate 1 wildcard entry for the Moto2 and MotoGP classes.

The FIM may, at each event, nominate 2 wildcard entries for the Moto3 and Moto2 classes and FIM/DORNA may, at each event, nominate 1 wildcard entry for the MotoGP class.

Superbike World Championship

Each Event host Federation (FMNR) may nominate 4 wildcard entries for the Superbike class and 2 wildcard entries for the Supersport and Superstock classes, in their own event only.

The FIM may nominate 2 wildcard entries for the Superbike class.

Motorcycle Speedway

In Motorcycle Speedway, wildcards compete in the Speedway Grand Prix events in which there is 1 wildcard per competition (until 2005 there were 2 per Grand Prix). As of 2014 six wildcards have won a Grand Prix: Mark Loram in 1999, Martin Dugard in 2000, Hans Andersen in 2006 (later that year he replaced a permanent rider and went on to win another GP), Michael Jepsen Jensen in 2012, Adrian Miedziński in 2013 and Bartosz Zmarzlik in 2014.

=== Car racing ===
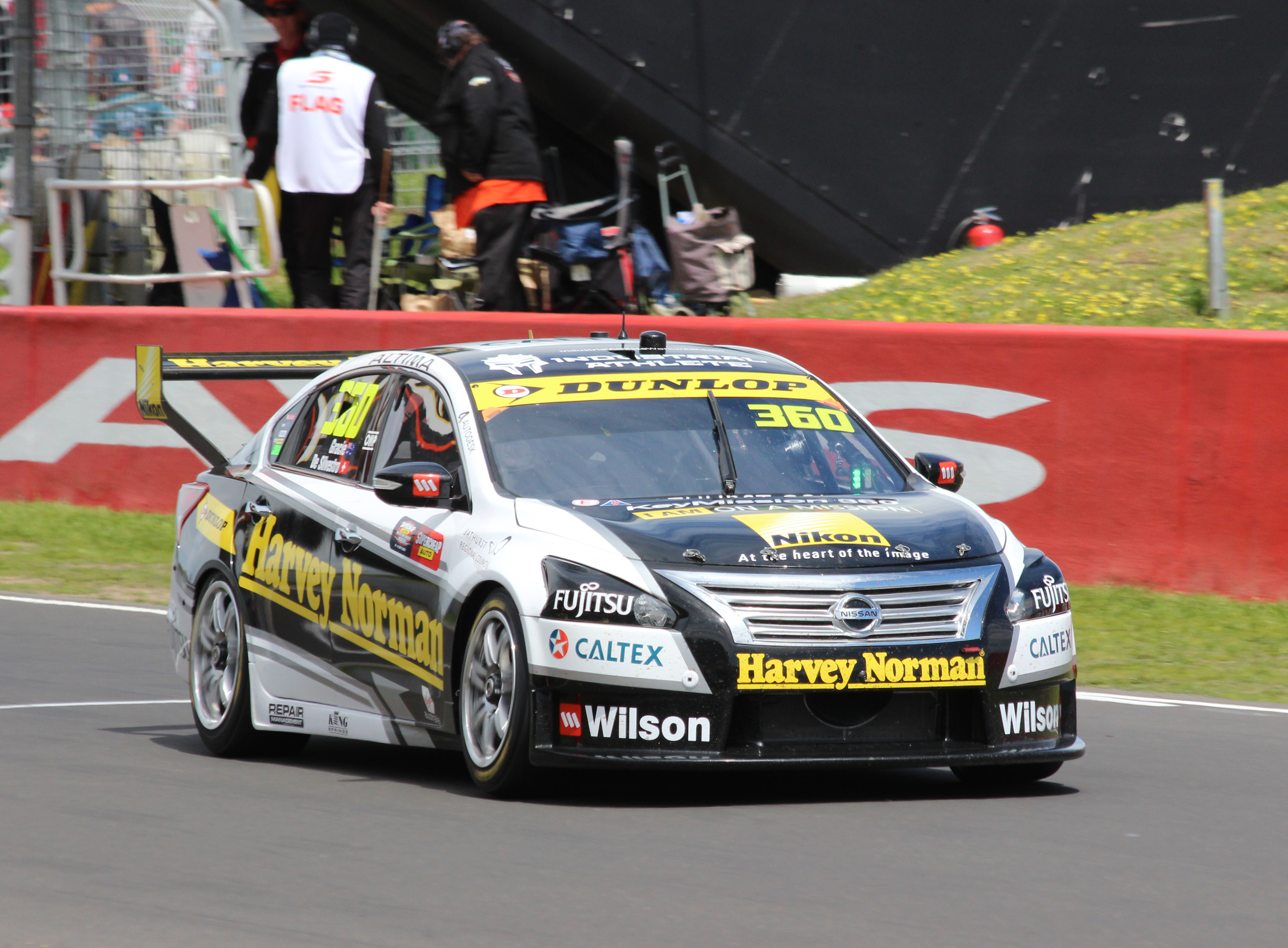
Simona de Silvestro and Renee Gracie's entry into the 2016 Bathurst 1000 was through a "wildcard" system.

Wildcard entries in car racing typically refer to a one-off or part-time entry that does not participate in the full season. Wildcard entries, such as ones in the V8 Supercars championship from 2009 or in F1 Academy from 2024, usually allow entries to score championship points despite their status as non-regular competitors – entries that cannot score championship points are usually labelled "guest entries".

The eligibility of wildcard entries is dependent on the championship – Formula One, for example, has an agreement in place that specifies a guaranteed number of teams and cars participate in all events with no exceptions. In addition, not all part-time or one-off entries are considered wildcards; such as the non-charter competitors in the NASCAR Cup Series.

In the aforementioned NASCAR Cup Series, they used a wild card championship format from 2011-2013 as a result of Jamie McMurray accumulating 2 victories before the Chase in 2010, but failed to make the 12-driver Chase. The format gave the top 10 in points (win or not) a chase berth. They then added two wild cards with the most wins between 11th-20th in points. Brad Keselowski and Denny Hamlin both qualified as the first wild card drivers in the 2011 Chase for the Sprint Cup. They would continue on to use this format through 2013, where the format was tainted due to Clint Bowyer's "Spingate" scandal at Richmond before the Chase, where he purposefully spun himself out and Brian Vickers took an unscheduled pit stop in an effort to sneak their Michael Waltrip Racing teammate Martin Truex Jr. into the Chase as the final wild card position. He would be removed from the Chase and after this season, the format would be removed in favour of the elimination-style format.

Indianapolis 500

The Indianapolis 500 has a special qualifying process, unique in major motorsports championships. Entries for the race differentiate from entries for the season, allowing more teams and more drivers to participate. Traditionally, the limit is 33 cars, but usually more are entered. To set a fair process, the slowest qualifiers participate in a special session, to determine the final grid positions and the 'bumped' cars. For this reason, the day has traditionally been called Bump Day.

On Saturday, normal qualifying occurs, where all the cars can set laptimes. Then, drivers who qualified 31st and below participate in a session called Last Chance Qualifying, on Sunday. It determines positions 31-33 and eliminates the slowest ones from participating in the race. If the entry list has 33 or fewer cars, the session is not held. So, on Saturday, drivers outside of the top 30 are guaranteed and have their positions locked.

== College and university sports ==
NCAA tournaments in all of its sports have included wildcard berths, typically known as at-large berths or at-large bids. Winners of each athletic conference's tournament (or, in the case of basketball's National Invitation Tournament, the team with the best regular season record in that conference) are granted automatic bids into the tournament, and a selection committee fills the remaining slots in the tournament bracket with who it determines to be the best teams who did not win their tournament (in practice, major conferences with stronger reputations and more revenue are invariably favored over mid-majors with similar records).

=== College basketball ===
Each year, the NCAA grants automatic berths for both the men's and women's Division I basketball tournaments to the winners of 32 conferences. Since the Ivy League added a conference tournament in 2017, every conference's automatic berth is granted to the team that wins its conference postseason tournament, provided that team is eligible to participate. If an ineligible team wins a conference tournament, the conference rules determine which team gets the league's automatic berth. For 2024–25 and 2025–26 seasons, the Pac-12 Conference is not sponsoring basketball, which reduces the number of automatic berths to 31.

Separate NCAA selection committees choose the teams that get at-large berths for the men's and women's tournaments. The committees consider a variety of factors in selecting the teams they believe to be the most deserving.

The fields of 68 teams that participate in both the men's and women's tournaments are filled as follows:

- 32 automatic berths (31 in the 2024–25 and 2025–26 seasons)
- 36 at-large berths (37 in the 2024–25 and 2025–26 seasons)

Division I independents do not play in any conference tournament and, therefore, do not have an opportunity to earn an automatic berth. Thus, they can only receive an at-large bid to the NCAA tournament. Chicago State is the most recent school to compete as an independent before joining the Northeast Conference prior to the 2024–25 season.

Teams may be ineligible for the NCAA tournament, if the NCAA has imposed a post-season ban, or if such a ban was self-imposed by the school, in response to violations of NCAA rules. Teams may also be ineligible if they are in transition to Division I from a different level of competition. Transition periods are generally three years for teams reclassifying from Division II and four years for those coming from Division III or another national affiliation organization.

The choices of the men's selection committee are revealed on Selection Sunday, a televised event where the bracket is revealed.

=== College football ===
At-large bids are sometimes used for bowl games contested between NCAA Division I Football Bowl Subdivision teams. Most bowl games have tie-ins with specific conferences; for example, the Rose Bowl Game has traditionally hosted conference champions from the Big Ten Conference and Pac-12 Conference (or their predecessors). Conferences are sometimes unable to provide a team to a bowl that they have a tie-in with; this happens when a conference has signed tie-in contracts with more bowls than the number of bowl-eligible teams it has in a given year. In such cases, bowl organizers will issue an at-large bid to a team in another conference or an independent team.

For example, the 2009 Humanitarian Bowl had tie-ins with the Western Athletic Conference and the Mountain West Conference. However, the TCU Horned Frogs of Mountain West were selected for the Fiesta Bowl (a New Year's Six bowl game), and all of the Mountain West's other teams were either tied into other bowls or ineligible. As a result, bowl organizers issued an at-large bid, which went to the Bowling Green Falcons of the Mid-American Conference.

== Game shows ==
=== Jeopardy! ===
Wildcards are a regular feature in tournaments of the popular game show Jeopardy!.

Jeopardy! tournaments generally run for 10 consecutive episodes (which air from Monday to Friday inclusive over two weeks) and feature 15 contestants. The first week's five episodes, called the "quarter-finals", feature three new contestants each day. The winners of these five games, and the four highest scoring non-winners ("wildcards"), advance to the semi-finals, which run for three days. The winners of these three games advance to play in a two-game final match, in which the scores from both games are combined to determine the overall winner. This format has been used since the first Tournament of Champions in 1985 and was devised by the late long time host Alex Trebek himself.

To prevent later contestants from playing to beat the earlier wildcard scores instead of playing to win, contestants are "completely isolated from the studio until it is their time to compete."

If there is a tie for the final wildcard position, the non-winner that advances will be based on the same regulations as two contestants who tie for second in a regular game; the tie-breaker is the contestant's score after the Double Jeopardy! round, and if further tied, the score after the Jeopardy! round determines the contestant who advances as the wildcard.

If two or more contestants tie for the highest score (greater than zero) at the end of a first round match, the standard tiebreaker is used with the player who loses that tiebreaker eligible for a wildcard. If none of the contestants in a quarter-final or semi-final game end with a positive score, no contestant automatically qualifies from that game, and an additional wildcard contestant advances instead. This occurred in the quarter-finals of the 1991 Seniors Tournament and the semi-finals of the 2013 Teen Tournament.

In the 2022 Polish version Tournament of Champions, which used 18 players, the 18 players were split into two groups of nine. The three winners in each group played in the semifinals, and the wild card was given to the highest scoring non-winner there to advance to the finals.

== Use outside North America ==
Although the term "wildcard" is not generally common in sports outside North America, a few competitions effectively (used to) employ such a system to determine one or more reserved places in a particular phase of a competition.

=== Olympics ===
In the Olympics, several sport governing bodies award wildcards to nations in order to further promote their sport. Sports governing bodies will either make selections or hold a tournament to determine the wildcards. One such notable wildcard selection was Equatorial Guinea swimmer Eric Moussambani, who finished last in the 100m meter event in the 2000 Summer Olympics. Other times, wildcard spots are offered to ease political tension such as the case of North Korean athletes participating in the 2018 Winter Olympics despite most of them not meeting the qualification criteria.

=== Basketball ===
==== FIBA Basketball World Cup ====
The world championship for basketball, the FIBA Basketball World Cup, invites four wildcards to complete its 24-team field. Teams have to participate in qualifying for the World Cup, have to apply to be one, and FIBA is not allowed more than three teams from the same continent in order to be selected. This setup began in 2006, where Italy, Puerto Rico, Serbia and Montenegro, and Turkey were selected by FIBA; Turkey made the best performance, reaching the quarterfinals. In 2010, FIBA selected Germany, Lithuania, Lebanon, and Russia as the wildcards, with Lithuania finishing third, and Russia making it to the quarterfinals. For the 2014 FIBA Basketball World Cup, FIBA selected Brazil, Finland, Greece, and Turkey; 2014 will be the last time FIBA will select wildcards, as the 2019 FIBA Basketball World Cup would no longer have wildcards when it expands to 32 teams. The perennial top two FIBA Oceania team namely Australia and New Zealand as wildcard teams of FIBA Asia Cup 2017 in Lebanon. These two teams are also part of FIBA Asia in Basketball tournaments including FIBA World Qualifying Tournament for FIBA World Cup 2019 in China.

==== Philippine Basketball Association ====
In the Philippine Basketball Association, the playoffs are done after an elimination (in 2005–06, a classification) round where the top two teams with the best records are given semi-final byes, the next 3 are given quarterfinal byes, the next 4 are given entry to the wildcard phase, and the tenth team is eliminated.

The winner of the wildcard playoffs, varying in format from a round-robin, a single-elimination or sudden death, usually meets the strongest quarterfinalist (the 3rd seed). The wildcard winner's next opponent for the quarterfinals rested while the wildcard phase was ongoing so the chance of advancing to the semi-finals (in which a team rested longer) is slim.

The only wildcard champion are the 7th-seeded Barangay Ginebra Kings in the 2004 PBA Fiesta Conference after 7 years of championship drought they made an epic run all the way to the throne, in which the top 2 teams were given semifinal byes while the bottom eight went through a knock-out wildcard tournament. Since the addition of the quarterfinal bye, no wildcard has entered the Finals, although the Air21 Express won the third-place trophy at the 2005-06 PBA Fiesta Conference. The wildcard set up was no longer used when the league reverted to the 3-conference format starting from the 2010–11 PBA season.

==== Euroleague ====
The Euroleague, a Europe-wide competition for elite basketball clubs, once had one "wildcard" advancing from its first phase, officially the regular season, to its second, called the Top 16. The rule was in place through the 2007–08 season.

At that time, the competition began each year with 24 clubs, divided into three groups. (Today, the competition starts with a preliminary stage of 16 teams playing down to two survivors, who join 22 other teams in the regular season.) Then as now, the groups played a double round-robin for the regular season, with eight clubs eliminated and the remaining clubs advancing to the Top 16. Under the rules in place through 2007–08, the top five clubs in each group automatically advanced. The final "wildcard" spot in the Top 16 went to the sixth-place club with the best overall record, with three potential tiebreaking steps. A coin toss is not indicated as a possible step.

Starting in 2008–09, the "wildcard" was abolished when the regular season was reorganized into four groups with 6 teams apiece. Now, the top four teams in each group advance to the Top 16. No change to the tiebreakers was made.

Starting in 2016–17 with the new league format, wildcard have been reintroduced.

=== ISU Grand Prix of Figure Skating Final ===
For both the junior and senior Grand Prix of Figure Skating Final (which starting in the 2008–2009 figure skating season will be merged into a single two-division event), the hosting federation may issue a wildcard invitation to one of their own skaters should no skater from the host country qualify for the event through the Grand Prix circuit. Use of the wildcard has not been common; however, it was used at the 2007–2008 Junior Grand Prix Final by the Polish federation.

=== All-Ireland Senior (Gaelic) Football Championship ===
In the All-Ireland Senior Football Championship, the premier competition in Gaelic football, each of the thirty-two counties in Ireland as well as London and New York play in their respective Provincial Championships through a knock-out cup competition format without seeds. The winners of each of the four Provincial Championships earn one of eight places in the All-Ireland Quarter Finals.

The thirty teams that fail to win their respective Provincial Championships receive a second opportunity to reach the All-Ireland Series via the All Ireland Qualifiers (also known as the 'back door', similar to a wildcard).

=== Road cycling ===
In road cycling (teams), a wildcard refers to an invitation to a race which a particular team would not normally be able to enter. Usually used for top division (currently UCI World Tour) races where the organization want more teams, lower league teams will be invited. It is very common to offer a wildcard for teams from the same country to help local sport and to boost national pride. For example, for the 2022 Tour de France, the organisers (the Amaury Sport Organisation) awarded two wildcards to French teams: Team TotalEnergies and B&B Hotels–KTM, both of which were UCI ProTeams and therefore not automatically invited, unlike the UCI World Tour teams which made up the vast majority of the entry list.

In January 2015, Team MTN–Qhubeka from South Africa accepted an invitation to participate at the 2015 Tour de France. This made them the first African team to receive a wildcard entry into the race.

=== Rugby ===
==== European club rugby competitions ====
Rugby union's analogue to the Euroleague is the European Rugby Champions Cup, which replaced the previous top-level club competition, the Heineken Cup, starting with the 2014–15 season. The Champions Cup maintains a system originally created for the Heineken Cup in which some "wildcard" teams advance to the competition's knockout stages. Also starting in 2014–15, the organiser of the Champions Cup, European Professional Club Rugby, introduced this type of "wildcard" to the second-level European Rugby Challenge Cup.

During the last five seasons of the Heineken Cup (2009–10 to 2013–14), another "wildcard" system allowed teams to parachute into the original European Challenge Cup, which has now been replaced by the current Challenge Cup. This was scrapped with the creation of the current Challenge Cup.

Both the Champions Cup and current Challenge Cup involve 20 clubs (compared to 24 in the Heineken Cup and 20 in the original Challenge Cup), divided into pools of four clubs with each club playing a double round-robin within its pool. In both competitions, eight clubs advance to the knockout stages. The top club in each pool advances; the three "wildcard" places are filled by the second-place clubs with the best overall records. For the Champions Cup, the number of wildcards increased by one from the Heineken Cup era; both versions of the Challenge Cup had three wildcards, but the original version filled them in an entirely different manner.

In the final years of the Heineken Cup, starting in 2009–10 and ending with the 2014 reorganisation of European club rugby, the three second-place teams with the next-best records after those that advanced to the Heineken Cup knockout stage parachuted into the Challenge Cup.

The tiebreaking procedure used to determine overall seeding, which was devised in the Heineken Cup era and carried over intact into the current era, is almost as elaborate as that of the NFL, with a total of seven steps (a coin flip is the last).

Prior to 2009–10, the original Challenge Cup also had "wildcard" teams entering its knockout stages. The top club in each pool advanced to the knockout stage, along with the three second-place teams with the best records, using the same tiebreaking procedure as the Heineken Cup. Starting in 2009–10, only the winner of each pool entered the knockout stage, to be joined by the teams parachuting in from the Heineken Cup. As noted above, with the creation of the new Challenge Cup, that competition abandoned this system in favour of the system used in the Champions Cup.

==== Super Rugby ====
The Super Rugby competition, involving regional franchises from Australia, New Zealand, and South Africa, adopted a new playoff system with "wildcards" when it expanded to 15 teams in 2011.

In its previous incarnations as Super 12 and Super 14 (each number reflecting the number of teams in the competition), it used a Shaughnessy playoff system in which the top four teams advanced to a knockout stage. The expansion to 15 teams led to major changes in the competition format.

Through the 2015 season, the competition was divided into three conferences of five teams each, with every conference consisting solely of teams from one of the participating countries. At the end of the regular season, the winners of each conference received playoff berths. These teams were joined by three "wildcards", specifically the three non-winners with the most competition points without regard to conference. (Tiebreakers were employed as necessary.)

With the expansion of Super Rugby to 18 teams in 2016, featuring a permanent sixth franchise for South Africa and new teams based in Argentina and Japan, the competition format was changed again.

The competition is now divided into the Australasian Group, including all Australian and New Zealand teams, and the African Group, consisting of the South African teams plus the Argentine and Japanese franchises. In turn, the Australasian Group is divided into Australia and New Zealand Conferences, and the African Group is split into Africa 1 and Africa 2 Conferences. As in the 2011–15 system, the conference winners will receive playoff berths. The number of wildcards will increase to four, with the three top non-winners from the Australasian Group and the top non-winner from the African Group, again based on competition points, earning those spots.

==== Rugby World Cup ====
In the current format of the Rugby World Cup, a team that finishes 3rd in their group automatically gains a berth in the next Rugby World Cup (although they do not advance to the next round).

Additionally, the Rugby World Cup qualifying format uses a repechage, in which teams from other regions that did not gain the automatic spot play each other for the final spots in the World Cup.

=== Australian rules football ===
The Australian Football League announced that the 2026 premiership season would introduce an expanded final series, featuring a Wildcard Finals Round during the usual bye week. Instead of the standard top 8 teams qualifying, the top 6 will secure a regular bye, while the 7th to 10th teams will face off in elimination matches. The 7th ranked team will play the 10th, and the 8th plays the 9th, with the highest ranked victor from either match becoming the 7th and 8th seed respectively.
