= Leinwand =

Leinwand may refer to:

- Goldene Leinwand, a German film award
- Leslie Leinwand, American biologist and entrepreneur
