= Kristyn =

Kristyn is a feminine given name. Notable people with the name include:

- Kristyn Dunnion (born 1969), Canadian author, performance artist, and bassist
- Kristyn E. Jones, former Assistant Secretary of the Air Force for Financial Management and Comptroller (2022–2023; 2024–2024)
- Kristyn Getty (born 1980), Northern Irish hymnist
- Kristyn Masters, American professor of bioengineering
- Kristyn Osborn (born 1970), American country singer, lead songwriter of SHeDAISY
- Kristyn Swaffer (born 1975), Australian footballer
- Kristyn Wong-Tam (born 1971), Canadian politician
