= 2025 Masters =

2025 Masters may refer to:

- 2025 Masters Tournament, golf major, held April 10–13 in Augusta, Georgia, US
- 2025 Masters (January), curling Grand Slam event, held January 14–19 in Guelph, Ontario, Canada
- 2025 Masters (September), curling Grand Slam event, held September 23–28 in London, Ontario, Canada
- 2025 PDC World Masters, darts tournament, held 30 January–2 February in Milton Keynes, England
- 2025 Masters (snooker), snooker tournament, held 12–19 January in London, England

== See also ==
- Masters (disambiguation)
