= Mastering =

Mastering may refer to

- Mastering (audio), the process of preparing and transferring recorded audio from a source containing the final mix to a data storage device, the master
  - Stem mastering, contains the same process as ordinary mastering but the individual audio tracks are grouped together into a few separated stems like drums, instruments, voices, etc.
- Bus mastering, a feature supported by many data bus architectures that enables a device connected to the bus to initiate transactions

== See also ==
- Master (disambiguation)
