= SS Cape Girardeau (AK-2039) =

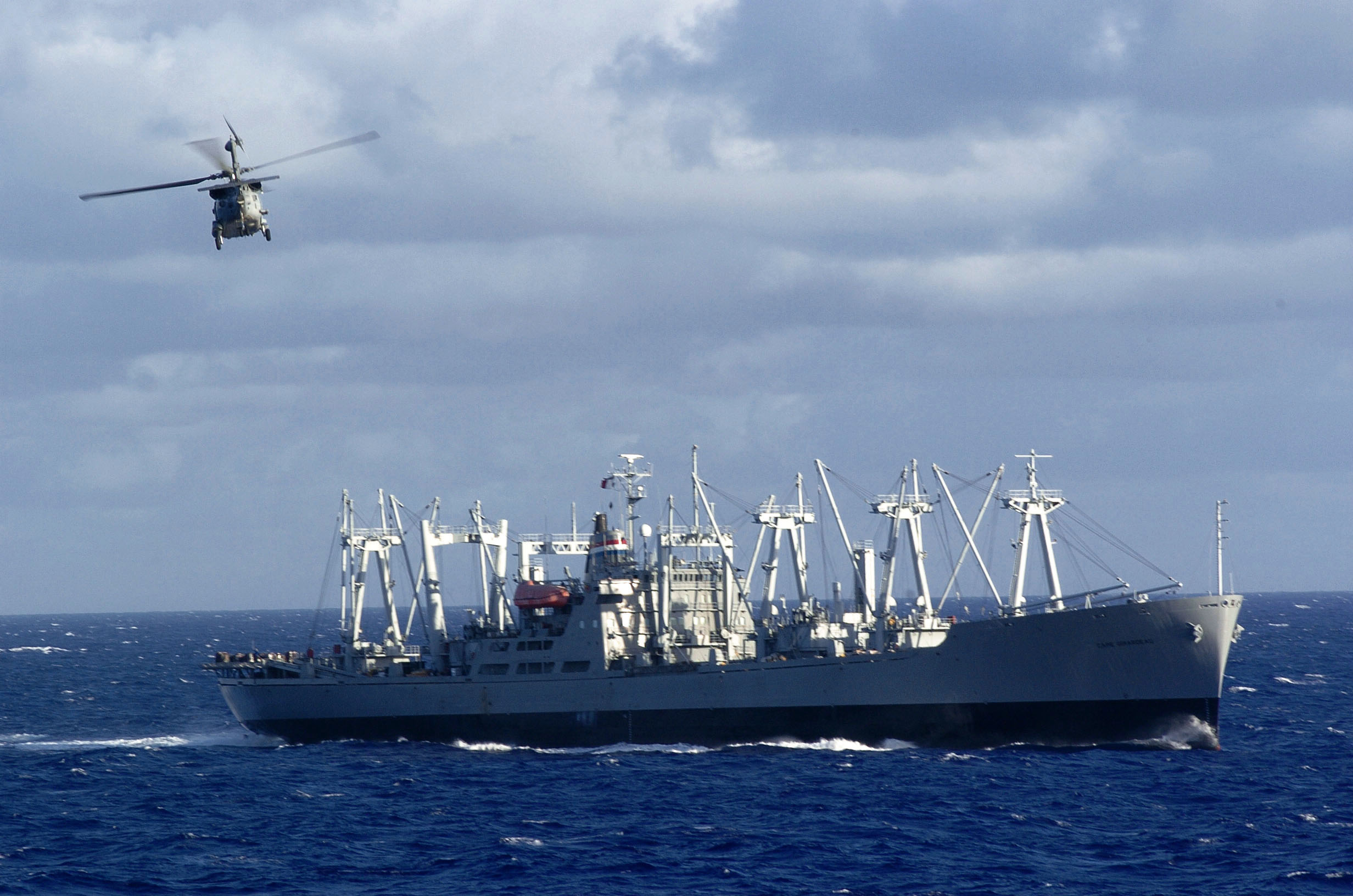
- SS Cape Girardeau Underway for RIMPAC 2004

History

United States
- Owner: US Maritime Administration
- Operator: Military Sealift Command
- Builder: Newport News Shipbuilding
- Laid down: 21 August 1967
- Launched: 16 April 1968
- Out of service: 24 July 2008
- Stricken: 23 October 2008
- Home port: Suisun Bay
- Identification: IMO number: 6815512
- Fate: Awaiting scrapping September 2023
- Status: Arrived in Brownsville for scrapping on September 11, 2023

General characteristics
- Class & type: Cape G Class (C5-S-75A)
- Tonnage: 16,563 GT, 19,929 DWT tonnes
- Length: 605 ft 0 in (184.40 m)
- Beam: 82 ft 0 in (24.99 m)
- Height: 140 ft 8 in (42.88 m)
- Draft: 35 ft 0 in (10.67 m)
- Propulsion: Two General Electric turbines, two boilers, single propeller, 19,250shp
- Speed: 20.8 kn (23.9 mph; 38.5 km/h)
- Crew: Reduced Operating Status: 9, Full Operating Status: 32
- Time to activate: 5 days
- Armament: None
- Aviation facilities: Helicopter platform

SS Cape Girardeau (T-AK 2039) is a Modular Cargo Delivery System (MCDS) ship in the National Defense Reserve Fleet. The ship is named for Cape Girardeau, Missouri.

== Commercial service ==
SS Cape Girardeau (ON: 517717) was a Maritime Administration (MARAD) type C5-S-75A hull. It was laid down on 21 August 1967 as the break-bulk freighter SS Alaskan Mail. Built by Newport News Shipbuilding (hull no. 587) under MARAD contract (MA-215), she was delivered on 29 October 1968 and began service with American Mail Line.

In 1973, American President Line, Ltd. purchased American Mail Line and continued operating the ship, changing its name to SS President Adams in 1978.

In order to maintain profitability of the ship, American President Lines sent President Adams for overhaul and modernization, which converted the ship from a type 01 (break-bulk) freighter to a type 58 (partial containerized) freighter. This allowed the ship to carry 332 TEU's as well as 1,082,207 cu ft. of bulk cargo on board.

In January, 1984, President Adams was transferred to the Military Sealift Command (MSC) for a three-year charter, after which she was returned to American President Lines.

== Federal service ==
A year after her three-year lease to the Military Sealift Command, American President Lines transferred the ship permanently to the MARAD in April, 1988. She was then renamed SS Cape Girardeau, and designated T-AK 2039.

As a MARAD ship, Cape Girardeau was homeported in Alameda, CA as part of the Ready Reserve Force.

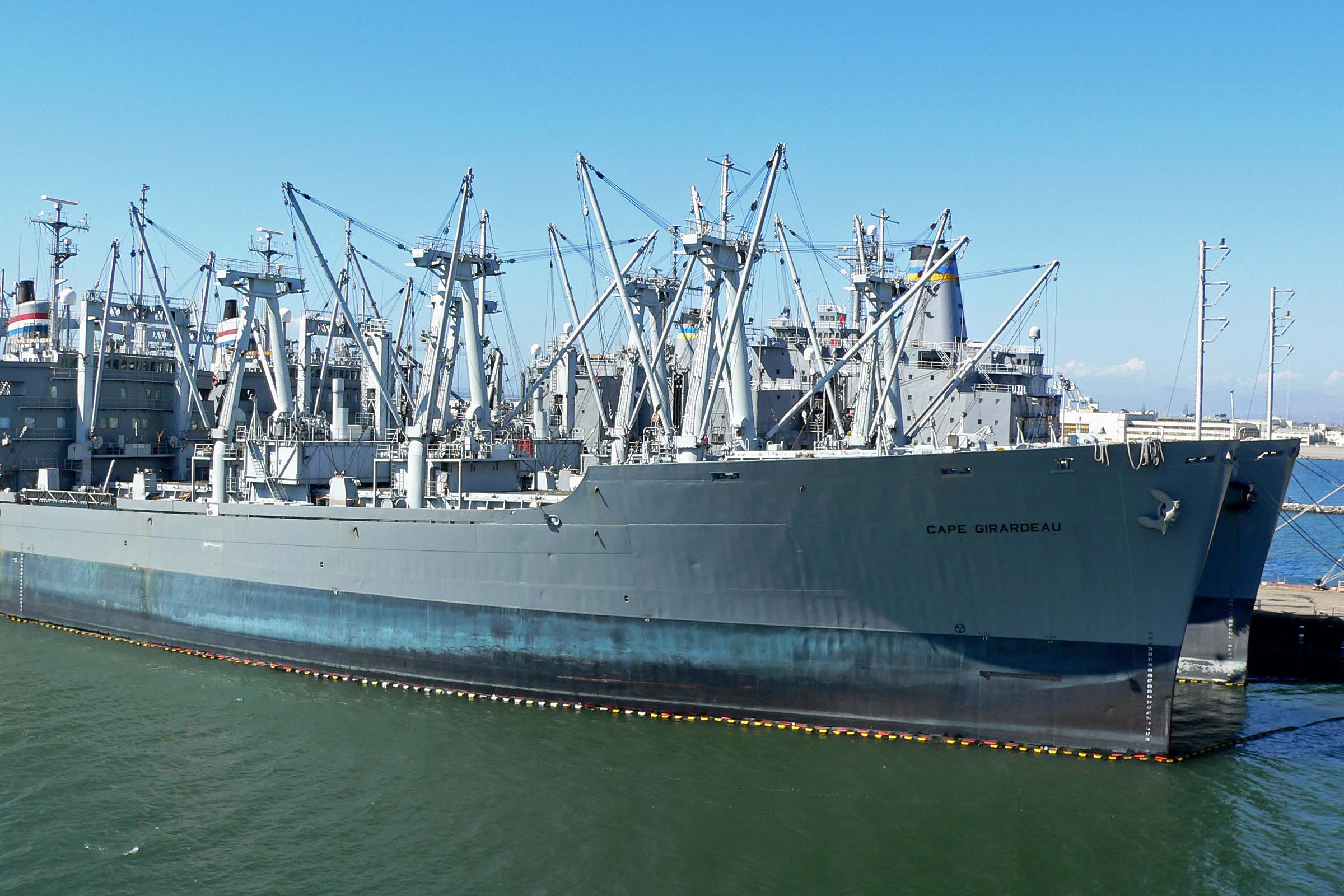
SS Cape Girardeau Moored at Alameda

In October 1989, Cape Girardeau was sent for a three-month drydock maintenance period. Just a year later, she would be activated by the Military Sealift Command for service in Operation Desert Storm.

During Desert Storm, she was assigned to Rear Admiral Stephen Clarey's Amphibious Group 3, carrying supplies in support of the 5th Marine Expeditionary Brigade. She returned home to Suisun Bay on 19 November 1991.

In the following years, she sat in the Reserve Fleet undergoing occasional activation drills and maintenance availabilities.

On January 12, 2001, Cape Girardeau was activated to participate in a west coast MCDS Exercise off the coast of Hawaii, where she became the second MCDS ship to participate in an underway replenishment (the first to do so with an aircraft carrier), by supplying the USS Abraham Lincoln. Upon successful completion of MCDS OPS WESTEX, Cape Girardeau returned home to Alameda.

In 2002, she underwent an activation to test the reserve force readiness.

2004 saw the Cape Girardeau activated for RIMPAC, which saw replenishing US and allied ships to increase interoperability, and to test the ship's delivery systems.

In 2008, the ship underwent a final dry dock period at BAE in San Francisco, before being transferred to the Suisun Bay Reserve Fleet for Ready Reserve Force lay-up in July. On 23 October, she was stricken from the Naval Register. Cape Girardeau was downgraded to Emergency Sealift status in 2009 and was later downgraded to disposal status.

On July 23, 2023, the vessel departed under tow by the tug Julie F to Brownsville to be scrapped and arrived on September 11, 2023.
