= Master–slave =

Master–slave, master/slave, or master and slave may refer to:

- Master–slave (technology), relationship between devices in which one controls the other
- Cow-calf (also known as master and slave), a set of switcher locomotives
- Master–slave dialectic, a concept in Hegelian philosophy
- Master–slave morality, a central theme of Friedrich Nietzsche's works
- Master/slave (BDSM), a type of consensual relationship of dominance and submission
- Letter 47 (Seneca), also known as On Master and Slave
- "Master/Slave", a hidden track by the alternative rock band Pearl Jam on the album Ten
- Master Slave Husband Wife (2023), a history of Ellen and William Craft's escape from slavery by Ilyon Woo

== See also ==
- Master (disambiguation)
- Slave (disambiguation)
