= The Mistress =

The Mistress may refer to:

== Film and television ==
- The Mistress (1927 film), a German silent film
- The Mistress (1953 film), or Vassa Zheleznova, a Soviet film
- The Mistress (1962 film), a Swedish film
- The Mistress (2012 film), a Filipino film
- The Mistress (TV series), a 1985–1987 British sitcom

=== Doctor Who characters ===
- Missy (Doctor Who), a female incarnation of the Master character in Doctor Who
- The Mistress, a depiction of Romana II in a series of Doctor Who audioplays

== Music ==
- The Mistress, a mixtape by Jay Sean, 2011
- "The Mistress", a song by Charlotte Church from Two, 2013
- "The Mistress", a track by Jesper Kyd from the film Tumbbad, 2018

== See also ==
- Mistress (disambiguation)
