= Gabriella Meister =

German businesswoman

- Known for: 63% owner, Rational AG (jointly with heirs)
- Spouse: Siegfried Meister (d. 2017)

Gabriella Meister is a German billionaire businesswoman, and the widow of Rational AG founder Siegfried Meister, who died in 2017. As of October 2021, her net worth is estimated at US$3 billion.

She was married to Siegfried Meister, and they lived in Landsberg am Lech, Germany. He died on 28 July 2017.

Siegfried's 63% stake in Rational AG was inherited by four family members, including Gabriella and their daughter Franziska Wuerbser.
