= Slaver =

Slaver may refer to:

- Slaver, an entity engaged in slavery, such as a:
  - Slave ship
  - Slave trade participant, such as a slave trader or slaveowner
- Slaver, i.e., saliva, either the result or act of drooling as opposed to normal salivation
- Slavers (1978), a film directed by Jürgen Goslar
- Slavers (Dungeons & Dragons), an adventure module for Dungeons & Dragons

== See also ==
- Slave (disambiguation)
