= Combi steamer =

Steam convection cooking appliance

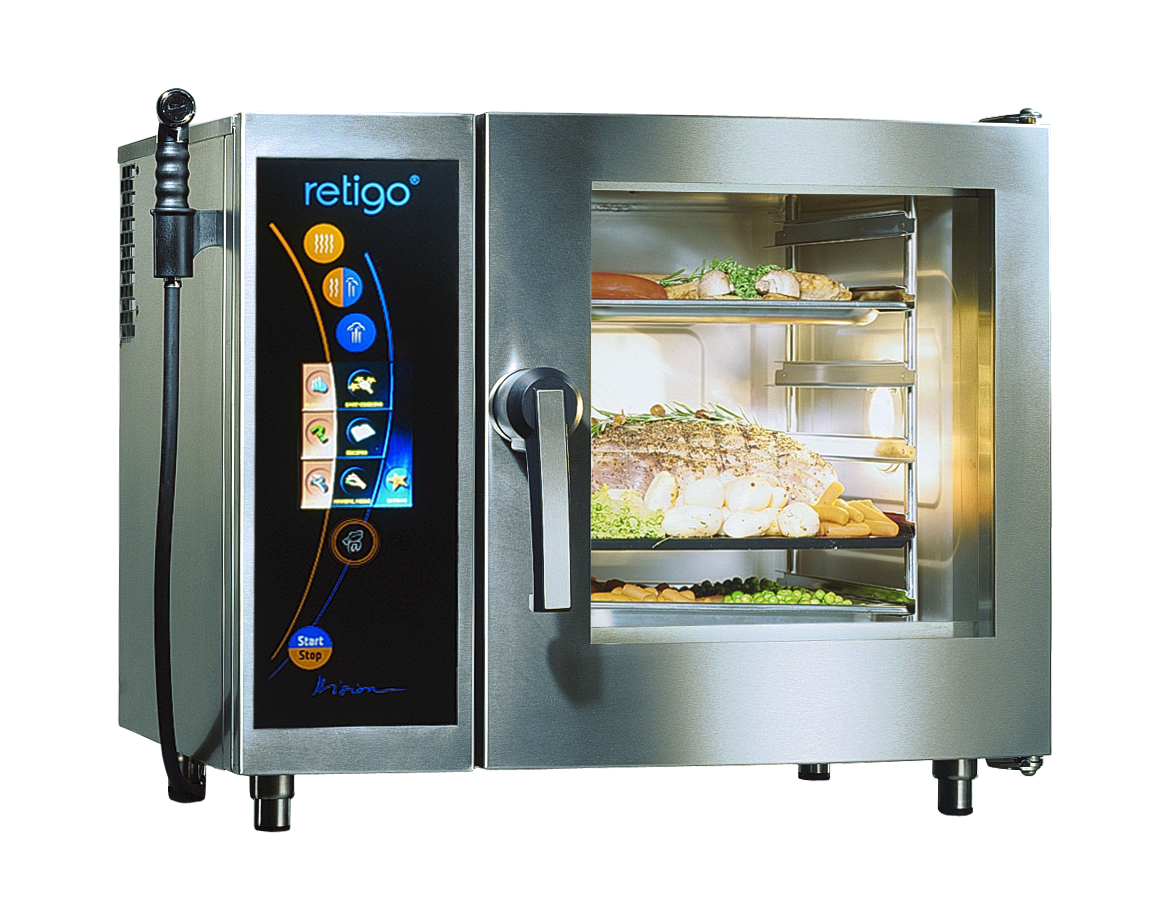
A commercial combi steamer with 6 levels

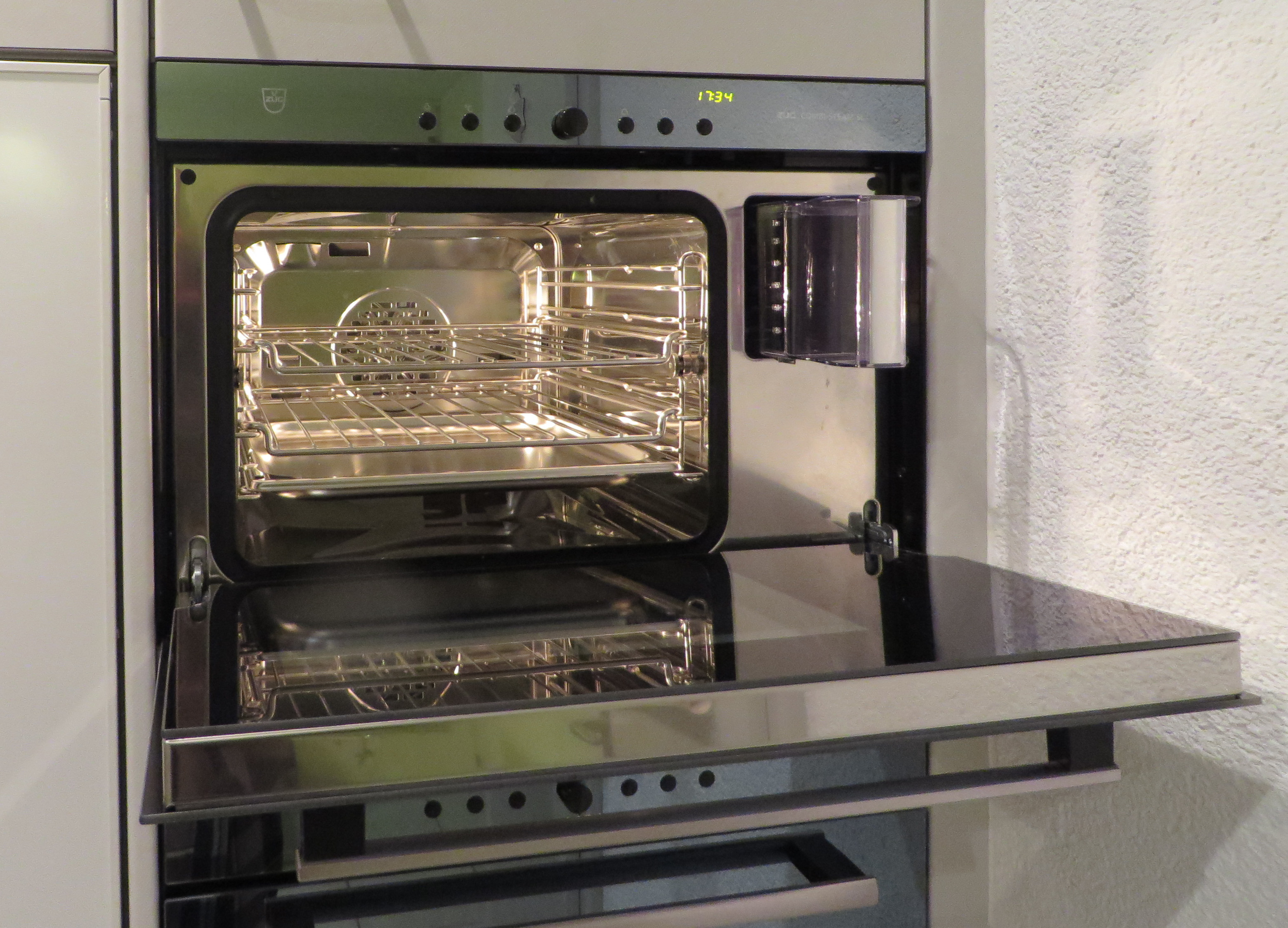
A household combi steamer with 4 levels, cabinet-mounted

Combi steamers (also called combi-steamers, hot-air steamers, combination steam-convection ovens, or simply combi ovens) are combination ovens that expand upon standard convection ovens in that they can also generate conventional moist steam or superheated steam and are capable of shifting between cooking modes automatically during the cooking process. They can be used to simultaneously steam vegetables or potatoes quickly and gently, while also roasting or braising meat and fish, or baking bread. The appliance is fit for many culinary applications, including baking, roasting, grilling, steaming, braising, blanching and poaching. These devices are cooking appliances typically used in professional catering or food service operations. They help gastronomy-industry professionals bridge the gap between economy and menu diversity while also maintaining the desired food quality.

The term convection oven is frequently used in connection with these appliances; however, standard convection ovens cook using only a fan to circulate the hot air around the food, without the additional steaming function.

== History ==
The first combi steamer was invented in the late 1960s by the company Burger Eisenwerke. The company was purchased by Juno in Herborn in 1976 and is now part of the Swedish corporation Electrolux, who developed the appliances further and now markets them under the Electrolux professional brand name.

The technology has been under constant development since its invention. Some manufacturers' models now use intelligent cooking processes to prepare food from start to finish with the touch of a button. Combi-steamer technology has fundamentally transformed the industrial-scale food preparation process, as the devices replace around half of conventional cooking appliances.

Numerous other manufacturers have entered this new market segment— today, over fifty companies around the world offer combi steamers, although that number also includes many industrial kitchen suppliers who merely purchase and rebrand the units.

Initially, the price was very high and they were popular for expensive public catering establishments. Later combi steamers became an integral part of kitchen equipment for many kinds of restaurants and for private households.

== Description ==
Steaming function works very well for foods like vegetables, potatoes and fish, while convection or combination (convection plus steam) heat is suitable for roasting, braising and baking. One disadvantage of convection heat is that foods tend to dry out more quickly; depending on the product, it may also require very long cooking times. Meanwhile, steaming alone does not get foods crispy enough.

Combining convection and steam heat utilizes the advantages provided by each cooking method, yielding tender meat with a crisp outer crust. Users also have complete control over the cooking environment, as the devices allow manual regulation of both temperature and humidity within the cooking chamber.

Combi steamers are used primarily to prepare food for larger numbers of people at one time. Combi steamers replace practically all conventional industrial-scale cooking appliances, such as convection ovens, stoves, pots and grills. They combine the advantages of steaming (e.g., short cooking times, low cooking loss levels, juiciness) with those of convection heat (e.g., intense flavor, appetizing color, crisp crusts).

The variety of cooking programs available, and the fact that they can be combined, provides users with practically limitless options.

== Characteristics ==
Thanks to short cooking times and the presence of steam inside the cooking chamber, combi steamers preserve vitamins and nutrients significantly more effectively than conventional cooking methods. Users can also prepare different dishes in different containers without transfer of flavor. Combi steamers typically offer the following modes of operation:

- Steaming (cooking using steam-saturated air) - typically at 100 °C (212 °F) but also anywhere between 30 and 130 °C (86 and 266 °F). This mode is also suitable for sous-vide or vacuum-method cooking.
- Convection (cooking in a hot-air environment, without feeding in additional steam) - temperatures range from 30 to 250 °C (86 to 482 °F) or 300 °C (572 °F), depending on the model.
- Superheated steam (a combination of the two methods named above) - temperatures range from 30 to 250 °C (86 to 482 °F) or 300 °C (572 °F).

Other special modes are available as well, such as cooking by monitoring core temperature, Delta-T cooking (monitoring the difference between the core temperature and the temperature inside the cooking chamber), low-temperature cooking, and regenerating pre-cooked, cooled food. Some models also have programs for drying moist products. More and more modern units operate using electronic sensor controls, which provide additional advantages in terms of both food preparation options and time efficiency.

== Technology ==
Combi steamers generate steam using one of two systems:

- Boiler or cauldron systems produce steam within a steam generator located outside the cooking chamber; steam is then fed into the cooking chamber as needed.
- Injection systems generate steam directly inside the cooking chamber by spritzing water onto the heating element within the core of the rotating ventilator, or onto a heat exchanger.

Combi steamers typically contain food racks with dimensions corresponding to Gastronorm specifications (GN racks); these racks may vary in width, so they are only suitable for certain sizes of containers (GN1/1 or GN2/3). Different models can hold different numbers of racks; typical sizes include 6, 10, 20, 24, and 40 racks. Units with six or ten racks are usually tabletop devices, while those with 20, 24 and 40 are free-standing. The number of racks may also vary from unit to unit, as they are typically removable and can also be replaced with racks corresponding to gastronorm (GR) roasting pan or baking tray dimensions. These racks provide space for additional roasts or baking trays, since these methods do not require deep containers.

Free-standing units can be filled and emptied rapidly by using so-called rack trolleys. These rolling carts make it possible to transfer entire batches of prepared containers in and out of the combi steamer all at once, which keeps loss of heat through the open door to a minimum. Users can thus cook large amounts of food at once while preparing another batch of containers on another trolley, and then quickly switch one trolley for another. Special plate rack trolleys are useful for quickly regenerating precooked, pre-plated meals.

Combi steamers require a water connection or a separate drinking water tank, as well as a water drain. On most manufacturers' models, the extremely high-output steam generators are at risk of experiencing rapid calcification, so the water connected must not have hardness levels over 6 °dH (107.1 ppm). Electrically heated units require a three-phase alternating current or single phase connection; gas-powered units require a gas line connection and single phase electrical connection. The devices also have exhaust-air lines to release steam into the surrounding air; they may also give off aromas and grease or oil, depending on the cooking method being used.

Generally speaking, users can program combi steamers to perform processes involving several sequential steps, and also save these programs to an electronic cookbook. DIN 18866 (Industrial kitchen appliances - fan, steam and combination ovens; German Institute for Standardization, June 2003) specifies the minimum requirements for combi steamers.

The units may have analog or digital controls; a few are also equipped with PC or USB interfaces, and some have touchscreen user interfaces.

== Advantages ==
The advantages of a combi steamer over other thermal equipment include:

- control of both temperature and humidity in the chamber, which reduces cooking time
- uniform cooking
- process logging
- lower temperatures preserve nutrients
- simultaneous processing of up to 12 different dishes without mingling of flavours
- food preparation without oil or fat; reduced carcinogen formation
- reheating previously prepared food without loss of moisture, or of crispness
- space saving, fewer kitchen appliances needed
- reduction of final product shrinkage losses
- electricity savings
- reduction of labour costs
- self-cleaning

== Disadvantages when compared to a standard microwave oven ==
There are at least two disadvantages to a combi-steamer when compared to a standard microwave oven:

A combi-steamer cannot:

- Applications limited to quantity of cavities
- Pop microwave popcorn
- Reheat beverages such as coffee or tea

== Principal producers ==
By country of origin:

- Australia/New Zealand: Convotherm, Culinaire
- Czech Republic: Retigo
- France: BONNET, Bourgeois
- Germany: RATIONAL AG, Gaggenau Hausgeräte, PALUX, Convotherm, MKN, ELOMA, Miele, AEG (part of Electrolux), Bosch.
- Indonesia: Nayati
- Italy: Lainox, Alphatech, Tecnoinox, MBM, Angelo Po, Foinox, Gico, Gierre, Unox, Olis, Zanussi (part of Electrolux), Electrolux Professional.
- Japan: AIHO, COMET KATO MFG., Hattori Kogyo, HOSHIZAKI Corporation, Maruzen, Nichiwa Electric Corporation, Nihon Choriki, OZAKI, Tanico, Washio Churi Industry
- Russia: Abat (Chuvashtorgtechnika)
- Spain: Fagor
- South Korea: LG Electronics
- Sweden: Electrolux Professional
- Switzerland: V-Zug
- Turkey: Inoksan - Inosmart
- United States: Alto-Shaam, Blodgett Oven Company, Vulcan, Wolf

== Household appliances ==
In addition to the professional food-service models, there are also smaller combi steamers for private household use. Most of these are cabinet-installed appliances built according to European Norm EN 1116 (width: 60 cm) or to the Swiss Measurement System norm (55-cm niche width). The household appliances are largely similar to those used in professional gastronomy, with the following differences:

- Many models have a water container that can be filled from the front, eliminating the need for a water line connection.
- Some units can run on only single-phase or split-phase electric current.

Manufacturers distinguish between combination devices with the same dimensions as standard household ovens (SMS: 76.2 cm, including drawer) and compact half-size devices (SMS: 38.1 cm) that may be either only steam ovens, or combined steamers with baking functions. The size of the usable cooking chamber space may vary based on the method used to generate steam and the location of the water container. Models with water containers on the side have taller, narrower cooking chambers than those whose containers are above or below the cooking chamber. Many new private kitchens include compact combi steamers as an alternative to built-in microwave ovens. When employed as an auxiliary appliance to normal ovens, combi steamers provide several advantages over microwave ovens:

- They allow new combination options when preparing meals, for example steaming vegetables or preparing a gratin in the combi steamer while roasting or braising meat in the conventional oven.
- They can be used to reheat previously prepared food (so-called "regeneration") and give it new characteristics; some foods can be reheated more effectively in combi steamers than in microwaves thanks to the combination of heat and steam. The units also make it possible to regenerate more than one plate of food at the same time.
- For meals consisting of (for example) just a pizza or a gratin, combi steamers can save energy compared to conventional ovens, since the chambers being heated are significantly smaller.

Built-in units cannot be disconnected from mains power. Even when the devices are switched off, their electronics still require electricity. Newer models with so-called stand-by modes often consume far less power in this way than older devices: even though the older models did not contain as many electronic components, they still typically required between 5 and 10 watts of power at all times for the clock, time display and controls. Under Swiss law, as of the beginning of 2013, new household appliances may require no more than one watt of power when in stand-by mode.

=== Countertop appliances ===
In addition to full-size ovens, there are also smaller, countertop combi steamers for private household usage as well. These countertop appliances have the same characteristic changes as the full-size household appliances, except that they are smaller, and cost significantly less than a full-size oven.

== See also ==
- Trivection oven
