= Slave (disambiguation) =

A slave is an individual held in forced servitude.

Slave or slaves may also refer to:

== Arts, entertainment, and media ==
=== Fictional entities ===
- Slave I, a Star Wars spacecraft
- Slave (Blake's 7), a fictional computer in Blake's 7

=== Films ===
- Slave, a 2009 film starring Natassia Malthe
- Slaves (film), a 1969 drama film
- The Slave (1917 comedy film), a 1917 film starring Oliver Hardy
- The Slave (1917 drama film), a 1917 Fox film starring Valeska Suratt
- The Slave (1918 film), a British silent crime film
- The Slave (1953 film), a French-Italian drama film
- The Slave (1962 film), a 1962 film starring Steve Reeves
- My Darling Slave or The Slave, a 1973 sex comedy film
- Ghulam (film), or Slave, a 1998 Indian film

=== Literature ===
- Slave - My True Story, a 2002 autobiography by Mende Nazer
- The Slave (Singer novel), a novel by Isaac Bashevis Singer
- The Slave (Hichens novel), an 1899 novel by Robert Hichens
- The Slave, a 1978 novel by Elechi Amadi
- "The Slave" or "Lu Scavu", a fairy tale from Sicily, Italy

=== Music ===
==== Artists ====
- Slave (band), an Ohio funk band
- Slaves (American band), a Sacramento, California-based rock band, now known as Rain City Drive
- Soft Play, a British punk band formerly known as Slaves

==== Albums ====
- Slave (Amen album), 1994
- Slave (Slave album), 1977
- Slave, by Lucky Dube, 1987

==== Songs ====
- "Slave" (François Feldman song), 1986
- "Slave" (James Reyne song), 1991
- "Slave" (Rolling Stones song), 1981
- "Slave", a song by The Amenta from n0n
- "Slave", a song by Bleeding Through from Love Will Kill All
- "Slave", a song by Elton John from Honky Château
- "Slave", a song by Leprous from The Congregation
- "Slave", a song by Logic from Bobby Tarantino
- "Slave", a song by Paradise Lost from One Second
- "Slave", a song by Pepper from Pink Crustaceans and Good Vibrations
- "Slave", a song by Prince from Emancipation
- "Slave", a song by Silverchair from Freak Show
- "Slave", a song by Soulfly from Enslaved
- "Slave", a song by Trust Company from True Parallels
- "Slave", a song by Weezer from Maladroit
- "Slaves", a song by Bad Religion from 80–85
- "Slaves", a song by The Browning from Hypernova
- "Slaves", a song by Wolves at the Gate from Captors

=== Theater ===
- The Slave (ballet), 1868
- The Slaves (play), a play by Mohammed ben Abdallah
- Slāv, a 2018 Canadian theatre production
- Lo schiavo (The Slave), a 1889 opera by Carlos Gomes

=== Sculpture ===
- The Slave, a sculpture in Philadelphia by Hélène Sardeau

== Places ==
- Slave craton, a geological formation in the Canadian Shield
- Slave River, a Canadian river

== Other ==
- Slave (BDSM), a form of consensual sexual submission
- Slave (technology), part of master/slave model of communication where one device has control over another

== See also ==
- Forced labour under German rule during World War II
- Ibadah, a servant or worshipper (in Islam)
- Slav (disambiguation)
- Slaver (disambiguation)
- Slavey (disambiguation)
