= Meister (surname) =

Meister (German for "master") is a German and Ashkenazi Jewish surname.

It derives from the Middle High German word “meister,” itself originating from the Latin “magister,” and originally referred to a master craftsman or a person of high standing. As a Jewish surname, Meister was often associated with rabbis or leading figures within Jewish communities. The surname is also found outside Germany, particularly in France (especially Alsace), the Netherlands, the Czech Republic, and Poland. In some cases, the name developed as a Germanized form of the Slovenian surnames Majster or Majšter, or the Czech surname Majstr.

Notable people with the surname include:

== A–G ==
- Abraham Meister (birth name of Al Lewis (actor); 1923–2006), American actor
- Alfred Meister (born 1942), Swiss rower
- Alton Meister (1922–1995), American biochemist
- Andi Meister (born 1938), Estonian road engineer and politician
- Beat Meister (born 1965), Swiss cyclist
- Cornelius Meister (born 1980), German conductor and pianist
- David Meister (born 1962), American fashion designer
- Doris Meister (born 1952), German swimmer
- Ernst Meister (1911–1979), German poet and writer
- Erwin Meister, Swiss entrepreneur
- Franz Meister, Austrian para-alpine skier.
- Gabriella Meister, German billionaire businesswoman
- George Meister (1854–1928), American baseball player
- Gérard Meister (1889–1967), French swimmer

== H–M ==
- Heinz Meister, German board game designer
- John Meister (1863–1923), American baseball player
- Joseph Meister (1876–1940), French animal attack victim
- Karl Meister (1891–1967), American baseball player
- Karl Wilhelm von Meister (1863–1935), German politician
- Konrad Meister (1930–2002) was a German pianist
- Linni Meister (born 1985), Norwegian model
- Lothar Meister (1931–2021), German cyclist
- Lucas Meister (born 1996), Swiss handball player
- Marc-Patrick Meister (born 1980), German football manager
- Michael Meister (born 1961), German politician
- Michael Meister (politician, born 1974) (born 1974), German politician
- Michelle Meister (born 1978), German field hockey umpire
- Morris Meister, American school principal and academic administrator

== N–Z ==
- Nick Meister (born 1995), Canadian curler
- Nicolas Meister (tennis) (born 1989), American tennis player
- Nicolas Meister (footballer) (born 1999), Austrian football player
- Nora Meister (born 2003), Swiss Paralympic swimmer
- Ralf Meister (born 1962) General Superintendent of Berlin and bishop-elect of Hanover
- Rudolf Meister (1897–1958), German general
- Siegfried Meister (1938–2017), German billionaire businessman
- Simon Meister (1796–1844), German painter
- Stefan Meister (born 1970), German yacht racer
- Steve Meister (born 1958), American tennis player
- Ted Daryll (Ted Meister; 1940–2021), U.S. musician
- Ulrich Meister (1838–1917), Swiss politician
- Urs Meister (born 1958), Swiss gymnast
- Viktor Meister (1925–2018), Estonian agronomist and economist
- William von Meister (1941–1995), American entrepreneur

== Fictional characters ==
- Music Meister, fictional character in Batman: The Brave and the Bold
- Wilhelm Meister, from the 1795 novel Wilhelm Meister's Apprenticeship by Goethe
