= Bernard A. Clarey =

United States Navy admiral

Bernard Ambrose Clarey
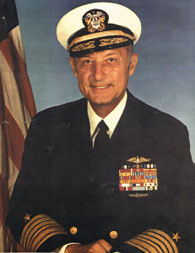
- Admiral Bernard A. Clarey
- Born: May 4, 1912; Oskaloosa, Iowa, US
- Died: June 15, 1996 (aged 84); Honolulu, Hawaii, US
- Military career
- Branch: United States Navy
- Service years: 1934–1973
- Rank: Admiral
- Nickname: Chick
- Commands: U.S. Pacific Fleet
- Conflicts: World War II; Korean War
- Awards: Navy Cross (3); Distinguished Service Medal (5); Silver Star; Legion of Merit; Bronze Star
- Other work: Bank of Hawaii, President

Bernard Ambrose Clarey (May 4, 1912 – June 15, 1996), nicknamed "Chick", was an admiral of the United States Navy. A submarine commander during World War II, he served during the late 1960s as Vice Chief of Naval Operations and in the early 1970s as Commander in Chief, U.S. Pacific Fleet.

== Early life and career ==
Clarey was born in Oskaloosa, Iowa, on May 4, 1912, son of Mrs. S. B. (Jennie A. O'Hearn) Clarey and the late Mr. Clarey. He was graduated from Oskaloosa High School and attended William Penn College for one year. He was appointed to the United States Naval Academy from his native state in 1930. As a midshipman he was on the Staff of the Lucky Bag. He was graduated and commissioned Ensign on May 31, 1934.

His first assignment after graduation was to the cruiser Milwaukee (CL-5) from June 1934 until December 1936. He entered instruction at the Submarine School at Submarine Base New London in January 1937. After designation as a submariner, he reported to the submarine Nautilus (SS-168) in June 1937. He served as Engineer, First Lieutenant and Communications Officer in the Nautilus when she was the flagship of Submarine Division Twelve, based at Pearl Harbor. In June 1941 he reported to Dolphin (SS-169).

== World War II ==
Clarey was executive officer on board Dolphin at Pearl Harbor when the Japanese attacked the Naval Base on December 7, 1941, and subsequently made one war patrol in Dolphin to the Marshall Islands.

After commissioning the Amberjack (SS-219) at New London, Connecticut, on June 19, 1942, he completed two war patrols in Amberjack off Bougainville and Guadalcanal Islands as executive officer. During the first war patrol, which lasted fifty-seven days, the Amberjack sank the 19,000-ton Japanese ship Tonan Maru, a 5,000-ton transport and a 7,000-ton cargo ship. She also delivered 9,000 gallons of aviation fuel, 200 100-pound bombs and a number of US Army Air Corps pilots to Tulagi. On her second war patrol, lasting fifty-one days, she scored one direct hit on a 4,000-ton freighter while patrolling south of Shortland, near Treasury Island.

"For conspicuous gallantry and intrepidity in action in the performance of his duties in the USS Amberjack during a war patrol of that vessel..." he was awarded the Silver Star. The citation further states: "As Assistant Approach Officer, his outstanding skill, excellent judgement and thorough knowledge of attack problems assisted his Commanding Officer considerably in conducting a series of successful torpedo attacks, which resulted in the sinking and damaging of enemy ships totalling more than 43,000-tons. In addition, he was of great assistance in conducting a successful reconnaissance of four enemy positions and completing a vital special mission, contributing immensely to the success of his vessel in evading extremely severe enemy countermeasures..."

Clarey made one additional patrol to the South Pacific as a prospective commanding officer (PCO) in the submarine Peto (SS-265). On January 1, 1944, he became the commanding officer of the new submarine Pintado (SS-387) at Portsmouth, New Hampshire.

Under his command, Pintado reached the Pacific in May 1944, and on her first war patrol in the area west of the Marianas and south of Formosa on a dark night in June, surfaced and fired six bow torpedoes at a Japanese convoy, making direct hits on two targets with all six torpedoes. Later between the Marianas and Luzon she sank three freighters and damaged a large freighter. Clarey was awarded the Navy Cross with the following citation:

For extraordinary heroism as Commanding Officer of the USS Pintado, during the first war patrol of that vessel in enemy Japanese-controlled waters, from May 16 to July 1, 1944. Maneuvering his ship through powerful escort screens, Lieutenant Commander Clarey launched repeated aggressive attacks to sink three Japanese freighters and damage a large freighter despite severe hostile countermeasures...

He was awarded a second Navy Cross, denoted by a Gold Star affixed to the suspension and service ribbon of his original medal, "For extraordinary heroism during Pintado's second war patrol in enemy-infested waters from July 24, 1944 to September 14, 1944". The citation states: "He pressed home a series of aggressive torpedo attacks against heavily escorted enemy ships, sinking two freighters and a large whaling ship of nearly 20,000-tons and maneuvered successfully and avoided damage to his submarine".

He was awarded a third Navy Cross, denoted by a second Gold Star affixed to the suspension and service ribbon of his original medal, for Pintado's third war patrol, in enemy-controlled waters of the South China Sea, between October 9, 1944, and January 1, 1945. The citation states: "Carrying out his duties as Officer in Tactical Command, Commander Clarey skillfully directed the coordinated search for his attack group known as "Clarey's Crushers", against a retiring enemy Task Force and contributed to the destruction of a Japanese light cruiser. He further led his submarines in an attack to sink a destroyer and damage an aircraft carrier. On the night of December 12–13, he conducted three surface attacks, in heavy seas, to sink two enemy merchantmen, which contributed to Pintado's sinking of over 40,000-tons of Japanese shipping".

Clarey also wore a ribbon for the Presidential Unit Citation awarded to Pintado.

Detached from Pintado in April 1945, he was assigned to the staff of Commander Submarine Force Pacific Fleet (COMSUBPAC) and was serving in that assignment at the cessation of hostilities in August 1945.

== Post-war, through late 1950s ==
Following World War II, in December 1945 he reported to the Navy Department, Washington, D.C., where he served until February 1946 in the Office of Public Information, as a member of the Secretary of the Navy's Committee on Reorganization. In April, he was transferred to the Office of the Naval Inspector General. From April 1947 until June 1949, he served on the Staff of Commander Submarine Force, Atlantic Fleet as Aide and Flag Secretary, Legal Officer, and Public Information Officer.

In June 1949, he returned to the Navy Department to serve in the Officer Personnel Division for Submarine Officer Assignments, in the Bureau of Naval Personnel, BUPERS.

In June 1951, he reported as executive officer of the heavy cruiser Helena (CA-75), which operated with the U.S. Seventh Fleet in Korean waters, participating in operations against North Korean and Chinese Communist Forces. He served as "XO" for eleven months and was awarded the Bronze Star with Combat "V" for his service aboard Helena.

After a tour as Commander Submarine Division Fifty Two from May 1952 to July 1953 in San Diego, he was ordered to the Politico-Military Policy Division, as Director Far East Branch, Office of the Chief of Naval Operations.

He was a student at the National War College from August 1955 to June 1956.

In August 1956, he was assigned at Pearl Harbor as chief of staff to COMSUBPAC.

In August 1958, he became commanding officer of fleet oiler Hassayampa. On January 5, 1959, he became the Director for Military Personnel in the Office of the Assistant Secretary of Defense (Manpower).

== Flag assignments ==
As commander of the Second Fleet (left), discussing Joint Operation Clove Hitch III with XVIII Airborne Corps commander, Lieutenant General John L. Throckmorton (right), April 1967.

Clarey was selected for promotion to Rear Admiral in July 1958 and in August 1958 was assigned as Director for Military Personnel Policy in the Office of the Secretary of Defense (OSD). In July 1962, Rear Admiral Clarey again reported to Pearl Harbor as Commander Submarine Force, U.S. Pacific Fleet (COMSUBPACFLT). For exceptionally meritorious service in this position, he was awarded the Legion of Merit.

On June 3, 1964, Clarey was promoted to Vice Admiral and became Deputy Commander in Chief, U.S. Pacific Fleet and Chief of Staff and Aide to Commander in Chief, U.S. Pacific Fleet (CINCPACFLT) at Pearl Harbor. In August, 1966, in Oslo, Norway, he became Commander U.S. Second Fleet (COMSECONDFLT) and Commander Striking Force, Atlantic (NATO).

Returning to the Office of the Chief of Naval Operations (OPNAV) in June 1967, Vice Admiral Clarey assumed the duties of Director, Navy Program Planning and Budgeting. In January 1968, he was appointed Vice Chief of Naval Operations and promoted to the rank of Admiral.

In December 1970, he returned to Pearl Harbor as Commander in Chief, U.S. Pacific Fleet (CINCPACFLT) in what was to be his terminal assignment. Admiral Clarey was relieved of duty on September 30, 1973, and retired from the navy with the rank of admiral on October 1, 1973.

== Post-Navy career ==
Admiral Clarey served as a vice president for the Bank of Hawaii from 1973 to 1977 and died June 15, 1996, at Tripler Army Medical Center in Hawaii.

== Family ==
Admiral Clarey married Jean Webster Scott (1918–2009), the daughter of Captain Leon B. Scott (USNA '15), on May 27, 1937, in Groton, Connecticut. They had two sons: Rear Admiral (retired) Stephen S. Clarey (born 1940) of Coronado, California, and Michael O. Clarey (born 1946) of Sydney, Australia. Tennis journalist Christopher Clarey is his grandson.

== Military Awards and honors ==
While on active duty, Admiral Clarey earned three Navy Cross Medals, the Silver Star Medal, the Presidential Unit Citation, the Bronze Star with Combat "V", the Legion of Merit and five Distinguished Service Medals. In addition, he was awarded the American Defense Service Medal with star, American Campaign Medal, Asiatic-Pacific Campaign Medal with one silver star and four bronze stars (nine operations), World War II Victory Medal, National Defense Service Medal, Korean Service Medal with star, United Nations Service Medal, Philippine Liberation Medal, Philippine Presidential Unit Citation and the Korean Presidential Unit Citation. In addition, after qualification for submarine warfare insignia he received the submarine officer badge, and for successful wartime service the Submarine Combat Patrol Insignia with stars.

Navy Cross with two gold stars	Navy Distinguished Service Medal with four gold stars	Silver Star	Legion of Merit
Bronze Star with Combat V	Presidential Unit Citation	American Defense Service Medal	American Campaign Medal
Asiatic-Pacific Campaign Medal with one silver and four bronze stars	World War II Victory Medal	National Defense Service Medal with one bronze star	Korean Service Medal with one bronze star
Presidential Unit Citation (Philippines)	Republic of Korea Presidential Unit Citation	Philippine Liberation Medal with one bronze star	United Nations Korea Medal

== Civilian Awards and honors ==
A long-time supporter of the Boy Scouts of America, Admiral Clarey was presented the Silver Beaver Award in 1976. He was awarded the Navy League of the United States Stephen Decatur Award for Operational Competence in 1971. A doctorate of humane letters honorary degree was conferred upon him by William Penn College in 1984.

== Namesake ==
In 1998, the floating bridge connecting Ford Island to the mainland was named the Admiral Clarey Bridge in Clarey's honor.

== See also ==
Admiral Clarey Bridge honors his advocating public-private sector collaborations.

Military offices
Preceded by John J. Hyland	Commander in Chief of the United States Pacific Fleet; 1970–1973	Succeeded by Maurice F. Weisner
