= Mistress =

Mistress is the feminine form of the English word "master" (master + -ess) and may refer to:

== Romance and relationships ==
- Mistress (lover), a female lover of a married man
  - Royal mistress
- Maîtresse-en-titre, official mistress of a French king

== Title or form of address ==
- Mistress (form of address)
- Mistress (college), a female college head
- Mistress of the Robes of the UK Royal Household
- Female equivalent of schoolmaster

== In ancient religions ==
- Despoina, a Greek goddess referred to as "the mistress"
- Potnia ("mistress lady"), a title for a Greek goddess

== In arts and entertainment ==
- Mistress (band), a band from Birmingham, England
- Mistress, a band from Germany, fronted by Angela Gossow
- Mistress (1992 film)
- Mistress (1987 film)
- Mistresses (British TV series)
- Mistresses (American TV series)
- Mistress (TV series)
- "Mistress", a song by Disturbed from Believe
- "Mistress", a song by Rebecca Ferguson from Superwoman
- "Mistress", a song by Suede from The Blue Hour
- Mistress (novel), by James Patterson, 2013
- Mistress Isabelle Brooks, American drag queen

== Other uses ==
- Dominatrix, in BDSM

== See also ==
- The Mistress (disambiguation)
