= Marsters =

Marsters is a variant of the more familiar Masters (surname).

It may refer to:

- Alton Marsters, 20th-century American college football player
- Ashley Marsters (born 1993), Australian rugby union player
- Bill Marsters (1923–2004), Cook Island religious leader, first president of the Cook Islands Christian Church
- Charles E. Marsters (1883–1962), American lacrosse player
- Esan Marsters (born 1996), New Zealand professional rugby league footballer
- James Marsters (born 1962), American actor, musician, and comic book writer
- James C. Marsters (1924–2009), American deaf orthodontist who helped invent the first teletypewriter
- Kirsten Fisher-Marsters (born 1998), Cook Islands Olympic swimmer
- Nathaniel Marsters (1758–1843), Nova Scotian farmer, magistrate, and politician
- Siniva Marsters (born 1980), Cook Island discus thrower
- Steven Marsters (born 1999), Cook Islands international rugby league footballer
- Sylvia Marsters (born 1962), New Zealand artist
- Tom Marsters (born 1945), Cook Islands politician
- William Marsters (1831–1899), English adventurer who settled on Palmerston Island, Cook Islands

== See also ==
- Master (disambiguation)
