= Mistress (novel) =

- First edition
- Author: James Patterson and David Ellis
- Language: English
- Genre: Thriller novel
- Publisher: Little, Brown and Co.
- Publication date: August 5, 2013
- Publication place: United States
- Media type: Print (hardcover)
- Pages: 449 pp (first edition, hardcover)
- ISBN: 0316211079 (for first hardcover edition)

Mistress is a stand-alone James Patterson novel, as it is not part any of the series novels written by Patterson.

== Plot ==
Ben Casper is the central character of this novel. The novel is written in the first person from Ben's point of view. Ben has an obsession with recalling trivia that continually sidetracks his thoughts. At the beginning of the book his friend Diana Hotchkiss appears to commit suicide, but the more Ben looks into it, the more it looks like murder. When Ben starts looking too much into this, some group then repeatedly tries to kill him and those associated with him. His ability to remember movie trivia is what keeps him alive to search for the killer of Diana and later others around Ben.

== Reviews ==
This book has been reviewed in a number of places. First of all, it held a number of spots on the Sept. 8, 2013, New York Times Bestseller list. In the combined Print and E-Book Fiction list it held fourth place. In the Hardcover Fiction list it held third place. In the E-Book Fiction list, a separate list from above, Mistress held fifth place.

The Films & Books website had a very positive review of Mistress. The review said, "The story's fast pace precludes boredom and will keep just about anyone reading it riveted." The Publishers Weekly website favorably reviewed the audiobook edition of this book, saying, "[Kevin T.] Collins manages to deliver thrills and plenty of fun in this audiobook that will appeal to listeners who don’t need to take their thrillers too seriously."
