= Metal Master (disambiguation) =

Metal Master or Metal Masters may refer to:

- Chad Collyer (also known as "Metal Master" or "The Metal Master"), an American professional wrestler and stage musician
- Beyblade: Metal Masters, the second season of Beyblade: Metal Fusion
- Metal Masters, a 1993 fighting game released for the Nintendo Game Boy, Atari ST, and the Amiga
- Metal Master (comics), a fictional character in the Marvel Universe

== See also ==
- Direct metal mastering, an analogue audio disc mastering technique
- Metal Mass, a heavy metal music service of worship
