= Stephen Clarey =

American rear admiral

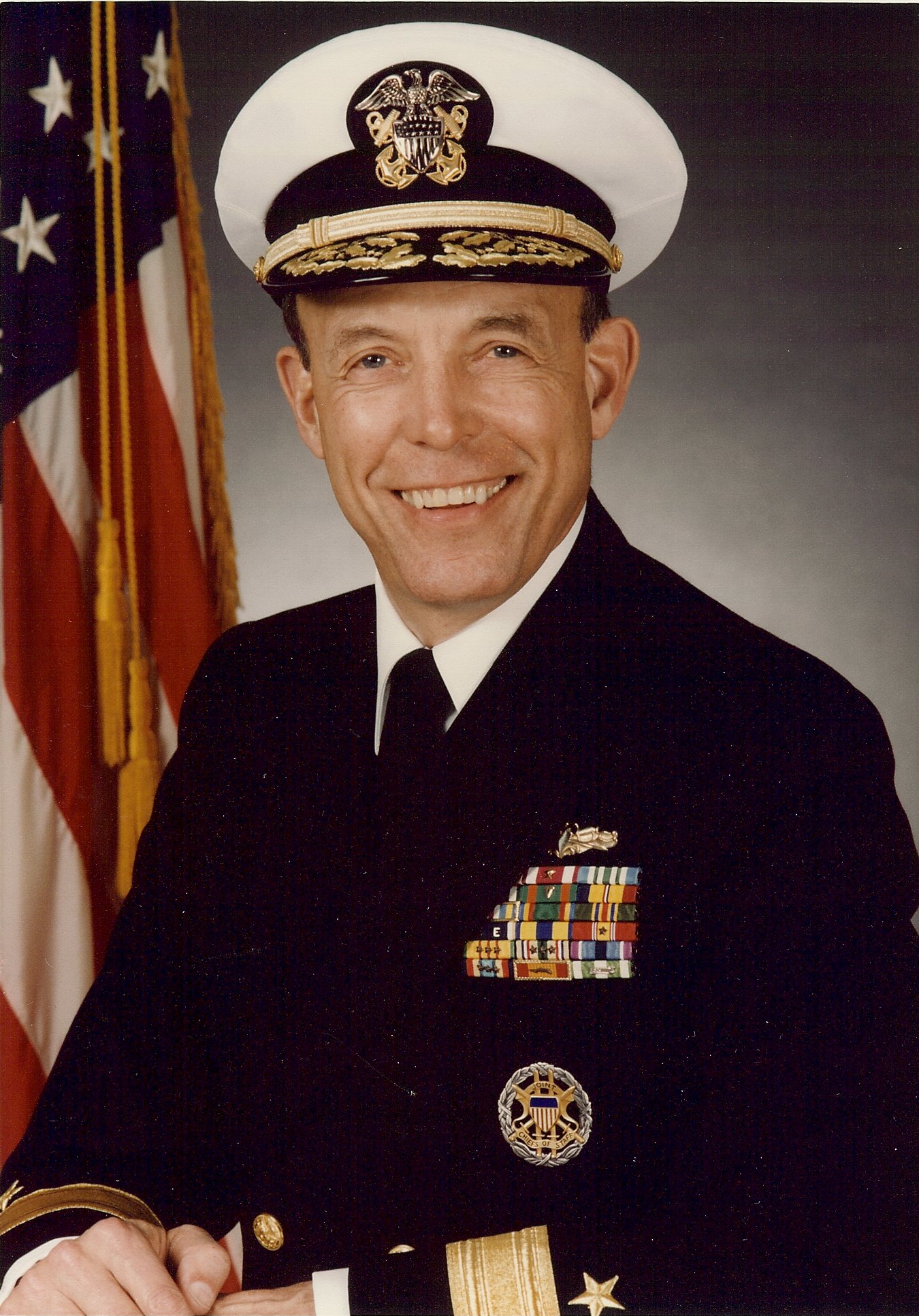
Stephen S. Clarey while serving as a rear admiral in the United States Navy

Stephen Scott Clarey (born 9 July 1940) is a retired United States Navy rear admiral (lower half) who commanded the U.S. Maritime Prepositioning Force during Operation Desert Shield and the Pacific Fleet/5th Marine Expeditionary Brigade Amphibious Task Force during Operation Desert Storm. He retired from the navy in August 1992 after thirty years of service.

== Early life and career ==
Clarey was born in Honolulu, Hawaii, on 9 July 1940, into a navy family, the son of the late Admiral Bernard A. Clarey and Jean Scott Clarey. His father Admiral "Chick" Clarey (USNA ’34) was a highly decorated submarine officer during World War II and served as the Vice Chief of Naval Operations and Commander in Chief, U.S. Pacific Fleet during the late 1960s and early 1970s. His maternal grandfather Captain Leon Scott (USNA ’15) was a submarine commander in the 1920s, assigned to the Asiatic Squadron in the Philippines.

Departing Honolulu shortly after the attack on Pearl Harbor, Clarey led the life of a service junior, moving often and attending thirteen different elementary and secondary schools.

He graduated from Punahou School in 1958 in Honolulu and then Williams College in 1962 in Massachusetts, where he was a member of the Delta Psi/Saint Anthony Hall fraternity, and a team manager for four years for Robert Muir, the U.S. swimming coach during the 1956 Melbourne Olympics.

He joined the navy immediately after graduating from Williams and obtained his commission in October 1962 from Officer Candidate School in Newport, Rhode Island, where he was the regimental adjutant. His son, tennis journalist Christopher Clarey, was born in Newport.

== Vietnam service ==
During his early Navy years Clarey served in destroyers Hollister (DD-788) and Bigelow (DD-942), deploying to the Mediterranean, Caribbean, and Western Pacific. He was the class honorman in Destroyer School Class #13. He made two deployments to the Tonkin Gulf during the Vietnam War, including a seven-month combat deployment providing naval gunfire support to U.S. Marine and Army combat units near the Vietnam DMZ, and interdicting North Vietnamese seaborne logistics during Operation Sea Dragon During the latter operation, Bigelow and other ships of her task unit came under fire eight times from North Vietnamese shore batteries, qualifying her crew the Combat Action Ribbon.

== Sea commands ==
Clarey had four commands-at-sea and made deployments to the Mediterranean, Pacific and Indian Oceans, and the Persian Gulf: the tank landing ship USS Suffolk County, the destroyer USS Elliot, Destroyer Squadron Twenty-One, and Amphibious Group Three, the latter composed of 27 ships and 13 subordinate commands totaling 18,000 military personnel Clarey also served as Executive Officer of USS Reeves from 1976–1978, deploying to the Western Pacific and completing a regular overhaul at Pearl Harbor Naval Shipyard.

During his Mediterranean deployment in command of USS Suffolk County, he made 10 exercise landings in Turkey, Italy, Corsica, Sardinia, and the coast of Spain. Princess Grace and Prince Rainier hosted his ship in Monaco over Christmas 1971, where he and his visiting wife Bonnie were hosted for Christmas Eve mass and dinner at the Royal Palace.

Clarey made the maiden deployment of the Spruance-class destroyer USS Elliot to the Western and Southern Pacific and Indian Oceans in 1979. Notable during the deployment was a period of surveillance operations conducted against the Soviet VSTOL carrier Minsk in the Arabian Sea. Elliot served as the flagship for Destroyer Squadron Thirty-One throughout his command tour.

During his command of Destroyer Squadron Twenty-one, he was embarked aboard USS Enterprise as the Battle Group ASW Commander during Fleetex 83, the largest fleet exercise ever conducted in the Northern Pacific. He subsequently deployed to the Western Pacific as the Surface Combatant Task Group Commander (CTG 75.1) embarked aboard USS Harry W. Hill, conducting 13 national, bi-lateral, and multi-national exercises with U.S. allies from Korea, Australia, Thailand, the Philippines, Malaysia, and Brunei.

== The First Gulf War – Operations Desert Shield and Desert Storm ==
As a flag officer, Clarey deployed twice to the Persian Gulf during the first Gulf War. He commanded the U.S. Maritime Prepositioning Force during Desert Shield and secured the arrival in Saudi Arabian ports of the first thirty prepositioned and fast sealift commercial cargo ships and the link-up of their combat equipment with over 50,000 airlifted Marines and army troops. Deploying from the West Coast again in December 1990, he commanded the Pacific Fleet/5th Marine Expeditionary Brigade Amphibious Task Force of eighteen ships and over 7,000 Marines. In February 1991, during the largest amphibious operation of Desert Storm, those Marines landed administratively in northeast Saudi Arabia where they joined in the coalition ground campaign in the liberation of Kuwait.

En route home from Desert Storm to San Diego, Clarey led an international naval relief force in Bangladesh in the aftermath of a devastating typhoon that killed more than 150,000. Sailors and Marines under his command delivered over 2,000 tons of disaster relief supplies to more than 1.5 million storm-ravaged inhabitants during Joint Task Force Operation Sea Angel.

== Shore assignments ==
Clarey served as a junior officer assignment officer in the Bureau of Naval Personnel from 1967–1969. He received an MBA from Harvard Business School in 1971 and served multiple tours in Washington, D.C., in national security planning and financial management.

Clarey directed the Navy Program Development branch during the early Reagan years and led the development of the financial plan for the president's "600-ship Navy". He later served from 1981 to 1982 as the senior aide and military assistant to the Chief of Naval Operations, Admiral Thomas B. Hayward, participating in senior military diplomatic missions to Morocco, Egypt, Israel, Chile, Argentina, and Brazil.

Following his major command tour in command of Destroyer Squadron Twenty-one, he served for three years (1985–1988) as the deputy commander and chief of staff of the Naval Surface Forces, U.S. Pacific Fleet, in Coronado, California. He was selected for promotion to rear admiral (lower half) in March 1988.

In his first flag officer assignment, he was the comptroller and chief financial officer of the Naval Sea Systems Command, one of the largest business enterprises in the Department of Defense.

== Civilian career ==
Clarey elected to retire from the navy as a rear sdmiral (lower half) in August 1992 after thirty years of service. In 1994, he joined National Steel and Shipbuilding Company (NASSCO), now a General Dynamics Company, in San Diego, where he rose to become the director of marketing and business development. He retired from NASSCO in October 2006.

At NASSCO he directed three multimillion-dollar joint industry–maritime administration–maritime technology (Maritech) commercial business development projects: cruise ships for Hawaii, high-speed electric-drive trailerships and double-hulled crude-oil tankers for Alaskan service. He also conducted the preliminary negotiations for a strategic relationship between NASSCO and Daewoo Shipbuilding and Marine Engineering in Korea, the world's second largest shipbuilder.

== Community service ==
Clarey has been active in community and civic affairs since retiring from the navy. He was treasurer and president of the San Diego USO and helped establish a permanent USO reception center at San Diego International Airport and a 14,000- square foot downtown USO recreation facility. He was a member of the San Diego County Citizens’ Commission on Local Government and Efficiency; was the Secretary of the Board of Governors of Alvarado Hospital; and was a founding director of the San Diego Fleet Week Foundation. He is a member of the Chancellor's Associates at UC San Diego and, as a long-time member of the leadership team at the UC San Diego Osher Lifelong Learning Institute, overseas curriculum and program development, and community outreach programs.

He was married to the former Roberta ("Bonnie") Rouzee (now deceased) of Manhasset, NY (Smith College ’63), former president of RR Clarey Associates, an industrial training consulting company. The Clareys have two adult children.

== Personal awards and decorations ==
- Legion of Merit (5)
- Meritorious Service Medal
- Joint Services Commendation Medal
- Navy Commendation Medal
- Navy Achievement Medal w/ Combat "V"
- Combat Action Ribbon

Clarey was awarded a Williams College Bicentennial Medal in 1994 for "distinguished achievement in naval command and administration.
