= Gil Masters =

American academic

Gilbert 'Gil' Masters was a professor of Civil and Environmental Engineering (emeritus) at Stanford University. Though he officially retired in 2002, he continued to teach two classes at the university until his death in 2026.

He was the author of six books, including the leading environmental science textbook Introduction to Environmental Engineering and Science (Prentice Hall), now in its third edition. He also published Renewable and Efficient Electric Power Systems (Wiley) and Energy for Sustainability: Technology, Planning, Policy (Island Press).

Within the broad field of environmental engineering, Gil Masters specialized in the interrelationships between environmental quality and energy consumption. His main focus was on the design and evaluation of renewable energy systems and energy efficient buildings, including photovoltaics, wind turbines, distributed generation, combined heat-and-power systems, fuel cells, passive solar design, and solar-thermal technologies.

Masters taught environmental courses at Stanford since the mid-1970s, including CE170, Man and the Environment.

Masters earned a number of teaching awards at Stanford, including the Gores Award for Excellence in Teaching, and the Tau Beta Pi teaching award from the School of Engineering.

== Education ==
Masters graduated from the University of California Los Angeles in 1961 with an undergraduate degree in electrical engineering and earned his masters in the same field a year later. As a graduate student at Stanford, he completed his thesis in electrical engineering in four years, titled "Threshold logic synthesis of sequential machines," in 1966.

== Early career ==
After leaving Stanford, Masters took at job at Fairchild Electronics where he helped develop the first 32-bit integrated memory circuit.

After two years, however, he left. After purchasing a VW bus, he traveled around the country. He began teaching electrical engineering courses at the Santa Clara University, but soon began teaching environmental classes. When the professor of a popular class at Stanford, CE170 Man and His Environment, announced his retirement, Masters took over teaching.

== Mid career ==
Masters continued to teach at the university, but as a Professor (Teaching). He focused on classroom teaching, development of new courses and curricula, and engineering education through textbooks and other works.

He gained a reputation as a master teacher, with enrollments in his classes climbing over 500 at a time. Recognized for his remarkable teaching ability, he earned a three-year Bing Fellowship for Undergraduate Teaching.

In 1981, he helped publish the second edition of the controversial book Other Homes and Garbage, titled More Other Homes and Garbage.

From 1982-1986, he served as the School of Engineering Associate Dean for Student Affairs.

For the 1992-1993 school year, he was the Interim Chair of the Department of Civil Engineering and Environmental Engineering.

== Retirement ==
Masters retired in 2002, but continued to teach part-time, six months of the year.

== Impact ==
Masters taught over 5,000 students in his time at Stanford and is credited with launching much of the environmental movement on campus.
