= Richard Masters =

Richard Masters may refer to:

- Richard Masters (football), chief executive of the Premier League
- Richard Master or Masters (died 1588), English physician and personal doctor of Queen Elizabeth I of England
- Richard George Masters (1877–1963), English recipient of the Victoria Cross
- Richard Masters (sailor) (born 1927), Bermudian Olympic sailor
- William Marsters (Richard Masters, 1831–1899), British adventurer
- Richard Masters, American actor who starred in the 1964 film The Starfighters
- Richard Alan Masters, coin designer

== See also ==
- Richard Master (governor) (1746–1800), British member of parliament for Cirencester and colonial governor of Tobago
- Richard Masterson, executed in the United States in 2016
- Sir Richard Masters Gorham (1917–2006), Bermudian politician
