= Rational AG =

German company

RATIONAL AG
- Logo of RATIONAL AG
- Type: Aktiengesellschaft
- Traded as: FWB: RAA; MDAX
- Industry: Manufacturing
- Founded: 1973; 53 years ago
- Headquarters: Landsberg am Lech, Germany
- Key people: Dr. Peter Stadelmann (CEO); Jörg Walter (CFO); Dr. Martin Hermann (CTO); Markus Paschmann (CSO); Walter Kurtz (Chairman of the Supervisory Board); Siegfried Meister (founder)
- Products: Combi steamers
- Revenue: € 1.194 billion
- Number of employees: 2,554 (2024)
- Website: www.rational-online.com

Rational AG is a German manufacturer and retailer of commercial and industrial kitchen equipment for thermal food preparation. The company is based in Landsberg am Lech, Germany, and was founded by Siegfried Meister in 1973. It operates worldwide and has 25 subsidiaries in Europe, Asia, North and South America as well as seven branches in Germany.

== History ==
The company was founded in 1973 by Siegfried Meister (* 1938, † 2017) with 18 employees as a company for the production and distribution of hot air appliances in Germany. These quickly superseded conventional ovens that were used in the commercial sector before then. Initially, the company produced deep fryers and ovens. In 1976, Meister invented the Rational combi steamer for commercial kitchens and started its production. From 1978 onwards, the company concentrated solely on combi steamers and discontinued all other product lines.

From 1991, Rational expanded abroad and founded its first subsidiary in the United Kingdom. In 1992, the company took over the French partner Frima. Since then, local sales companies have been established in multiple countries across the world.

In 2000, "Rational GmbH" was converted to a stock corporation. Since March 3, 2000, the company has been listed in the Prime Standard of the Frankfurt Stock Exchange.

In 2008, Rational opened its third plant in Landsberg. On March 4, 2009, the company was promoted to the MDAX. As of September 22, 2014, Rational AG was listed in the SDAX. In 2012, Peter Stadelmann joined the company and took over the business from 2014.

On August 11, 2016, Rational moved back up to the MDAX, and on September 18, 2017, the stock again moved to the SDAX. In 2018, Frima was renamed Rational and its VarioCookingCenter has since been marketed under the Rational brand.

On September 23, 2019, Rational returned to the MDAX. In April 2022, the contract of CEO Peter Stadelmann was extended until November 2027.

== Company ==
Rational AG, based in Landsberg am Lech, Germany, is a globally active company specializing in equipment for thermal food preparation in professional kitchens. It maintains seven national and 25 international subsidiaries across Europe, Asia, North America, and South America. As of 2024, Rational AG has an export share of approximately 89.1%. In 2024, Rational AG reported annual sales of €1.194 billion and employed around 2,554 people.

== Products ==
Rational AG produces innovative commercial kitchen appliances including the iCombi Pro, iCombi Classic, iVario Pro, and the newly introduced iHexagon (launched in 2024).

The iCombi series consists of intelligent combi steamers combining steaming, baking, roasting, grilling, and convection cooking. The iVario Pro integrates multiple cooking functions—replacing separate kitchen appliances such as tilting pans, kettles, or fryers—in a single multifunctional device.

Introduced in 2024, the iHexagon is Rational's latest innovation. It combines steam, hot air, and microwave technologies, for rapid, consistent, and precise cooking across its six cooking levels; which the company claims reduces preparation times compared to traditional methods.

All Rational appliances, including iHexagon, can be digitally managed through the company's cloud-based ConnectedCooking platform. This allows remote control, digital menu planning, recipe management, as well as access to instructional videos and an extensive online recipe library.

Combi ovens (iCombi product line) generate approximately 90% of Rational's appliance sales, while about 10% comes from the iVario series and newly added iHexagon appliances. Rational manufactures and tests combi ovens primarily at its production site in Landsberg am Lech.
