= Steve Masters =

Steve or Stephen Masters may refer to:

- Stephen Masters (cricketer), English cricketer who flourished in the 1810s
- Stephen Masters (rower) (born 1969), Danish lightweight rower
- Steve Masters (DJ), American radio and club DJ
- Steve Masters (speedway rider) (born 1970), English speedway rider
- Mike Miksche, American artist and sadomasochist
