= Slavey (disambiguation) =

Slavey may refer to:

- Slavey, a First Nations indigenous peoples
- Slavey language, an Athabaskan language
- Slavey Jargon, a trade language used by Indigenous peoples and newcomers in the Yukon area
- Slavey Raychev, (born 1943) a former Bulgarian basketball player
- The Lady Slavey, an 1894 operetta

== See also ==
- Sahtu, formerly the North Slavey people
