= Siegfried Meister =

German billionaire businessman (1938–2017)

- Born: 17 October 1938
- Died: 28 July 2017 (aged 78)
- Occupations: Founder and 63% owner, Rational AG
- Spouse: Gabriella Meister

Siegfried Meister (17 October 1938 – 28 July 2017) was a German billionaire businessman, founder and 63% owner of Rational AG.

== Early life ==
Meister was born in 1938. He trained as an electrical engineer.

== Career ==
In 1973, he founded Rational AG, which rose to success as a result of the popularity of the combination steamer, which he helped to develop. He owned 63.7% of Rational.

In March 2017, Forbes estimated his net worth at US$3.8 billion.

== Personal life ==
He was married to Gabriella Meister, and they lived in Landsberg am Lech, Germany. He died on 28 July 2017.
