= Kristyn Masters =

American bioengineer and academic

Kristyn Simcha Masters
- Education: Rice University; University of Michigan, Ann Arbor
- Scientific career
- Workplaces: University of Colorado Boulder; University of Colorado Denver; University of Wisconsin Madison
- Thesis: Pharmacologically active materials for localized nitric oxide therapy (2002)
- Website: [Masters Lab https://kmasters4.wixsite.com/masters-lab]

Kristyn Simcha Masters is an American bioengineer who is professor and Chair of the Department of Bioengineering at the University of Colorado Denver. She works as Director of the Anschutz Medical Campus Center. Her research looks to create tissue-engineered models of disease, with a focus on cancer and cardiac disease.

== Early life and education ==
Masters studied chemical engineering at the University of Michigan, Ann Arbor. She moved to Rice University for her doctorate, where she studied pharmacologically active materials for nitric oxide therapy. She moved to the University of Colorado Boulder for postdoctoral research.

== Research and career ==
Masters joined the University of Wisconsin–Madison in 2004, where she developed tissue-engineered models of disease, with a focus on cancer and heart disease. To do this, she studied the interactions between cells and biomaterials, investigating how the cellular microenvironment impacts cell behavior. She was made the Vilas Distinguished Achievement Professor in 2016.

Masters moved to the University of Colorado Denver in 2023, where she was made Chair of the Department of Bioengineering and Director of the Anschutz Medical Campus Center.

== Awards and honors ==
- 2008 American Society for Engineering Education Biomedical Teaching Award
- 2008 Outstanding New Educator Award2016 H.I. Romnes Faculty Fellow
- 2018 Elected Fellow of the American Institute for Medical and Biological Engineering

== Selected publications ==
- Rachael H Schmedlen; Kristyn S Masters; Jennifer L West (1 November 2002). "Photocrosslinkable polyvinyl alcohol hydrogels that can be modified with cell adhesion peptides for use in tissue engineering". Biomaterials. 23 (22): 4325–4332. doi:10.1016/s0142-9612(02)00177-1. ISSN 0142-9612. PMID 12219822. Wikidata Q44130310.
- Gennyne A Walker; Kristyn S Masters; Darshita N Shah; Kristi S Anseth; Leslie Leinwand (24 June 2004). "Valvular myofibroblast activation by transforming growth factor-beta: implications for pathological extracellular matrix remodeling in heart valve disease". Circulation Research. 95 (3): 253–260. doi:10.1161/01.res.0000136520.07995.aa. ISSN 0009-7330. PMID 15217906. Wikidata Q47290439.
- Kristyn S Masters; Darshita N Shah; Leslie Leinwand; Kristi S Anseth (1 May 2005). "Crosslinked hyaluronan scaffolds as a biologically active carrier for valvular interstitial cells". Biomaterials. 26 (15): 2517–2525. doi:10.1016/j.biomaterials.2004.07.018. ISSN 0142-9612. PMID 15585254. Wikidata Q51570240.
