= Christopher Clarey =

American sports journalist

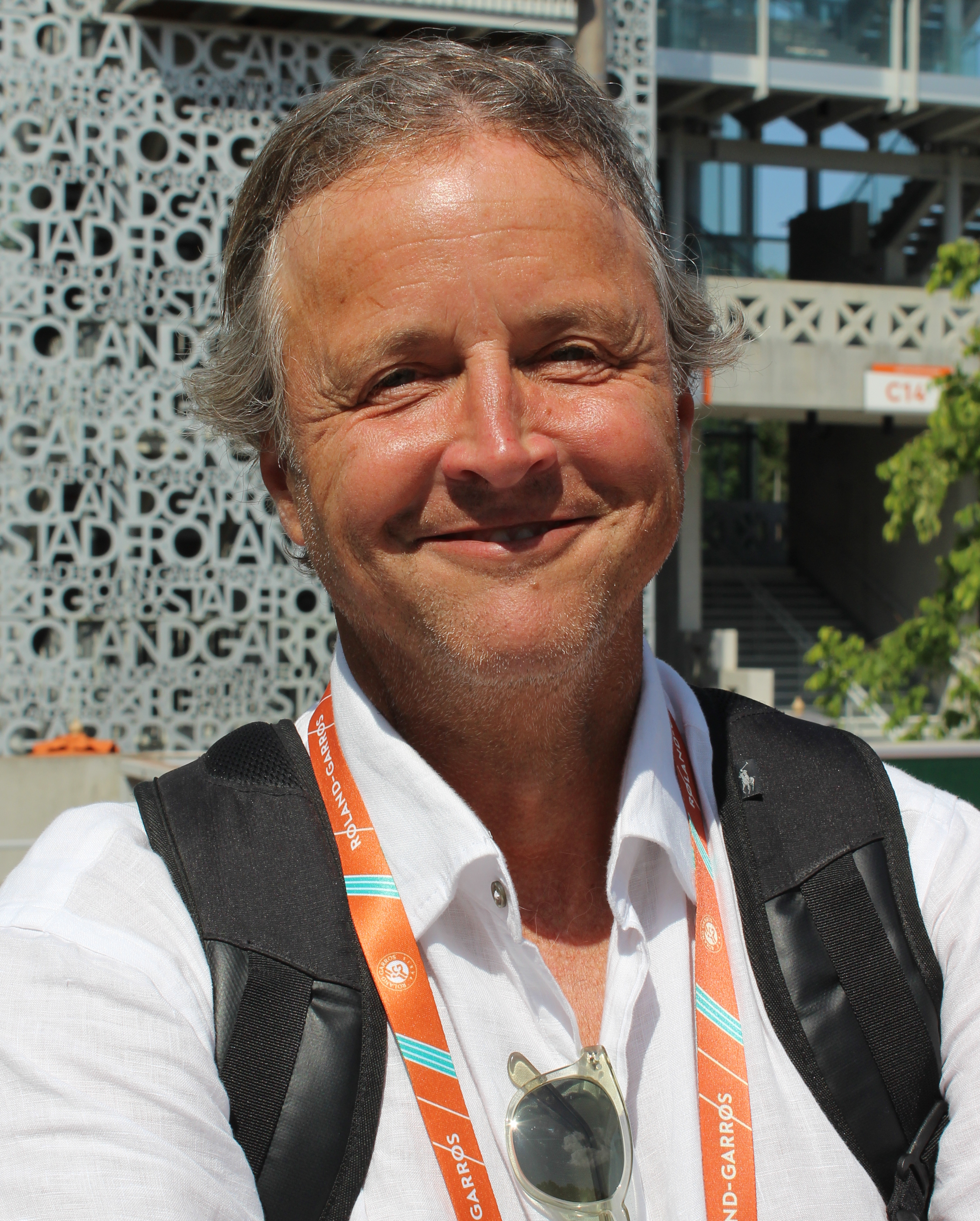
- Clarey at the 2023 French Open
- Born: 1964 (age 61–62); Newport, Rhode Island, U.S.
- Education: Williams College (BA)
- Occupations: Journalist; writer
- Years active: 1991–present

Christopher Clarey (born 1964) is an American sports journalist and author who mostly writes about tennis. He reported for The New York Times from 1991 to 2023. His biography of Roger Federer, The Master, was published in 2021 and was a New York Times bestseller.

== Early life and education ==
Clarey was born in Newport, Rhode Island, to Bonnie Clarey and US Navy Rear Admiral Stephen Clarey. His grandfather was Admiral Bernard "Chick" Clarey. Being in a military family, he moved often in his youth. He attended Punahou School in Honolulu from seventh to ninth grade at the same time that Barack Obama went to the school. He graduated from Coronado High School in California, where he played tennis and soccer and wrote for the student newspaper. He went to Williams College in Massachusetts, where he played tennis, soccer, and volleyball, and received his Bachelor of Arts (BA) in English and history in 1986.

== Career ==
Clarey started his journalism career as an intern at The San Diego Union-Tribune, where he covered local sports, including the National Football League (NFL)'s Chargers. In 1991, he moved to Paris to work as a freelance reporter.

Later that year, he secured his first byline in The New York Times—a profile of the French ice dance siblings Paul and Isabelle Duchesnay—after his former editor at the Union-Tribune recommended him to the Times sports editor. (Note: In Clarey's first Times byline – Clary, Chris (December 26, 1991). "Albertville Profile; Ice Dancing for a Medal, and for France". The New York Times – his surname was misspelled.) He continued to write for the Times and, in 1998, became the chief sports correspondent for its sister publication, the International Herald Tribune. The London Times said in 2021 that Clarey "has a claim to be the doyen of English-language tennis journalism".

The Master, a biography of Roger Federer by Clarey, was published on August 24, 2021, as Federer's tennis career came to an end. Clarey had followed Federer closely for the entirety of his career and reportedly interviewed Federer more than any other journalist. Contemporary reviews in The London Times called The Master the best book on Federer written so far.

In May 2023, Clarey announced that he was leaving the Times to focus on writing books and to launch a newsletter, Christopher Clarey's Tennis & Beyond. His second book, "The Warrior, Rafael Nadal and His Kingdom of Clay" the story behind the fourteen Roland Garros championships won by Rafael Nadal and the history of the tennis venue Roland Garros was published in May 2025 and has already been translated into fourteen languages.

== Personal life ==
Clarey married his wife, Virginie, in Paris in 1991.

== Awards ==
- Alan Trengove Award for Excellence in Tennis Journalism (2017)
- Eugene L. Scott Award, International Tennis Hall of Fame (2018)
- David A. Benjamin Achievement Award, Intercollegiate Tennis Association (2024)
