= Leslie Leinwand =

American biologist

- Born: American
- Education: Cornell University, Yale University and Rockefeller University
- Scientific career
- Fields: Molecular Biology and Cellular Biology
- Workplaces: University of Colorado Boulder, Howard Hughes Medical Institute, and Albert Einstein College of Medicine

Leslie Leinwand is an American biologist and serial entrepreneur who works on the genetics and molecular physiology of inherited diseases of the heart, and on how gender and diet modify the heart. She is currently a Distinguished Professor of Molecular, Cellular, and Developmental Biology, and the Chief Scientific Officer of the BioFrontiers Institute at the University of Colorado Boulder.

== Education ==
Leinwand completed her undergraduate studies at Cornell University, her doctoral studies at Yale University, and her postdoctoral training at Rockefeller University, all in molecular biology.

== Career ==
After completing her postdoctoral training, Leinwand joined the faculty at the Albert Einstein College of Medicine in New York in 1981, where she eventually attained the rank of Full Professor and was Director of the Cardiovascular Research Center. In 1995, she was recruited to the University of Colorado Boulder to chair the Department of Molecular, Cellular, and Developmental Biology. In 2003, she co-founded the Colorado Initiative for Molecular Biotechnology, which was formalized in 2009 as the BioFrontiers Institute, where she continues to serve as its Chief Scientific Officer. She became a Howard Hughes Medical Institute Professor in 2006, and is an Ex-officio Board Member of the Global Down Syndrome Foundation.

== Awards ==
Leinwand is a Fellow of the AAAS, a former MERIT Awardee of the NIH, an Established Investigator of the American Heart Association, and an elected member of both the American Academy of Arts and Sciences and the National Academy of Inventors. Leinwand's excellence in teaching has been recognized by Howard Hughes Medical Institute's Professor Program.
