= Maistre (disambiguation) =

Maistre may refer to:

- Compte de Maistre (French: Count of Maistre), see Joseph-Marie, Comte de Maistre
- Baron Almaury de Maistre (French: Baron Almaury de Maistre), see Baronne Almaury de Maistre
- John A. Gauci-Maistre K.M. (born 1947), Maltese businessman
- Maistre (surname)
- De Maistre (surname)
- Le Maistre (surname)

== See also ==
- Maistre Jhan (1485-1538; French: Maestro Ihan) French composer
- Maistre Wace (1110-1174; French: Maestro Wace) French poet
- Maitre
- Meister
- Master (disambiguation)
- Maestro (disambiguation)
- Magister (disambiguation)
