= Mastre =

Mastre may refer to:

- Mastre (title), a title used for medical doctors in Cyprus, see History of medicine in Cyprus
- Mastre-Pavajeau House, Valledupar, Cesar, Colombia; a noted architectural landmark, see Architecture of Cesar Department
- Angel Mastre, Jr. (politician), a Philippine Liberal party candidate in the 2016 Zambales local elections
- Richard Master aka Richard Mastre (died 1588), personal doctor of Queen Elizabeth I of England

== See also ==
- Mastrevirus
- Mastress, feminine form of title
- Meister
- Maistre
- Maitre
- Master (disambiguation)
- Maestro (disambiguation)
- Magister (disambiguation)
