= Lemaître =

Lemaître, Lemaitre, Le Maitre, or variation, is a French surname meaning "the master" – derived from the Latin word "magister".

Notable people with the surname include:

== Lemaître ==
- Anne Lemaître (born 1957) Belgian applied mathematician
- Delphine Philippe-Lemaître, (1798–1863), French historian, archaeologist, botanist
- Frédérick Lemaître (1800–1876), French actor and playwright
- Georges Lemaître (1894–1966), Belgian Roman Catholic priest and astronomer, who formulated the "Big Bang" theory of cosmologic origin of the physical universe.
  - Named for Georges Lemaître:
    - Lemaître (crater), an impact crater on the Moon
    - 1565 Lemaître, a minor planet
    - the Friedmann–Lemaître–Robertson–Walker metric
    - the Lemaître metric
    - the Lemaître–Tolman metric
    - Lemaitre (band), Norwegian indie electronic band
    - Georges Lemaître ATV, an uncrewed spacecraft
- Jules Lemaître (1853–1914), French critic and dramatist
- Maurice Lemaître (1928–2018), French painter
- Jean Lemaître (mechanical engineer) (1898–1974), Belgian mechanical engineer, who developed a steam locomotive exhaust

== Lemaitre ==
- Christophe Lemaitre (born 1990), French sprinter
- Pierre Lemaitre (born 1951), a French author and a screenwriter
- Rafael Lemaitre, French carcinologist

== LeMaitre/Le Maitre ==
- George D. LeMaitre (1933–2018), American vascular surgeon
  - LeMaitre Vascular, company founded by the surgeon in 1986
- Jade Le Maître (fl. 2010s), a roboticist

== See also ==
- Lemaitre (band), Norwegian indie electronic duo
- Le Maistre (surname)
- Maitre (surname)
