= Maestro (disambiguation) =

Maestro, meaning "master" or "teacher" in Italian, is a term of respect used particularly in the international music world.

Maestro(s) may also refer to:

== Books ==
- The Maestro, a novel by Tim Wynne-Jones
- Maestro (character), a version of the Hulk from an alternate future in Marvel Comics
- Maestro (manga), a manga series by Akira Sasō
- Maestro (novel), a novel by Peter Goldsworthy

== Brand names ==
- Austin Maestro, a car built by Austin-Rover
- Gibson Maestro, the most popular of several Gibson Vibrola vibrato mechanisms for guitar
- Maestro, a brand of gastric electrical stimulator
- Maestro (airline), a Canadian charter airline
- Maestro (debit card), a debit card operated by MasterCard
- Maestro (service), an American live-streaming platform
- Maestro (software), a software application used by NASA and Jet Propulsion Laboratory
- Maestro (TV channel), a Georgian TV channel
- Maestro I, a software-hardware combination considered to be the world's first integrated development environment (IDE) for software
- Maestro PMS, a software product from Northwind Canada Inc.
- Maestro Talent and Management, a defunct Malaysian company owned by Astro

== Film and television ==
- Maestros (film), a 2000 Spanish comedy film
- Maestro (2003 film), an American documentary
- Maestro (2005 film), a Hungarian animated film
- Maestro (2014 film), a French film
- Maestro! (2015 film), a Japanese film
- The Maestro (2018 film), an American film
- Maestro (2021 film), an Indian film
- Maestro (2023 film), an American biographical film about Leonard Bernstein
- Maestro (British TV series), a 2008 BBC reality TV show
- "The Maestro" (Seinfeld), a 1995 episode of the TV show Seinfeld

== Music ==
- "Maestro", makers of the effect unit the Echoplex
- "Maestro", a quarterly magazine about Ennio Morricone
- Maestro (producer), producer of contemporary pop and hip-hop music
- Maestro Fresh Wes, Canadian rapper
- Maestro Harrell, American rapper
- Travis "Maestro" Meeks, singer and guitarist for the band Days of the New
- Maestro di cappella, literally "chapel-master"

=== Albums and EPs ===
- The Maestro (Horace Parlan album), a 1979 album by Horace Parlan
- The Maestro (Cedar Walton album), a 1981 album by Cedar Walton featuring Abbey Lincoln
- Maestro (Kaizers Orchestra album) (2005), and the title song
- Maestro (Taj Mahal album)
- Maestro (Moacir Santos album)
- Maestro (EP), 2005 EP by Kaizers Orchestra
- Maestros (album) by Orquesta El Arranque

=== Songs ===
- "Maestro" (Alla Pugacheva song), 1981
- "Maestro" (Seventeen song), 2024
- "Maestro", from Sarah Close's Caught Up
- "The Maestro", from Beastie Boys' album Check Your Head
- "The Maestro", from Caro Emerald's album The Shocking Miss Emerald, 2013

== People ==
- Maestro (footballer) (António Simão Muanza), Angolan footballer
- The Maestro (wrestler), ring name of professional wrestler Robert Kellum
- Ilaiyaraaja, Indian composer and singer
- Savior (gamer), stage name of StarCraft player Ma Jae-yoon, also known as "The Maestro"
- Maestro Fresh Wes, stage name of Canadian rapper Wesley Williams

== Video games ==
- Maestro (2004 video game), a MusicVR game by Mike Oldfield
- Maestro (2024 video game), a virtual reality game by Double Jack

== Other uses ==
- Maestro, a character in the Zatch Bell! anime series
- The Maestro, a character in Seinfeld
- Maestro (wind), a type of Mediterranean wind

== See also ==
- Maestra (novel), a 2016 novel by British author Lisa Hilton, under the penname L.S.Hilton
- Maestra: Strings of Truth, a 2023 South Korean television series
- Stromae, Belgian musician and producer whose name derives from Maestro
