= List of Karakuri Circus episodes =

Key visual of the series

Karakuri Circus is a Japanese anime television series based on the manga series Karakuri Circus by Kazuhiro Fujita. The 36-episode anime television series adaptation aired from October 11, 2018, to June 27, 2019, on Tokyo MX and BS11.

The series is animated by Studio VOLN and directed by Satoshi Nishimura, with series composition by Toshiki Inoue and Kazuhiro Fujita and character designs by Takahiro Yoshimatsu. Yuki Hayashi composed the series' music and Twin Engine produced the series. The episodes were collected in three Blu-ray sets released by VAP between June 19 and October 23, 2019. Bump of Chicken performed the series' first opening theme song, "Gekkō" (月虹), and Lozareena performed the first ending theme song "Marionette" (マリオネット, Marionetto). The second opening theme song is "Haguruma" (ハグルマ), performed by Kana-Boon, and the series' second ending theme song is "Yūdachi" (夕立ち), performed by Memai Siren. The third opening theme song is "Over Me", performed by Lozareena, while the third ending is the previous first opening song "Gekkō" by Bump of Chicken.

The series was simulcast exclusively on Amazon Video worldwide. In February 2021, Sentai Filmworks announced that they had licensed the series for home video and digital release. It was released on Blu-ray Disc on May 18, 2021.

== Episodes ==
No.	Title	Directed by	Written by	Original release date
1	"The Curtain Rises"; Transliteration: "Kaimaku Beru" (Japanese: 開幕ベル)	Junichi Fujise; Michiru Itabisashi	Toshiki Inoue	October 11, 2018
Narumi Katou is dressed in a bear costume, handing out leaflets for the Straw Circus when Masaru Saiga accidentally bumps into him wheeling a large suitcase. Narumi begins to have a Zonapha attack and tries to make any passer-by laugh. Eventually Masaru laughs, saving Narumi, but the boy is abducted by three men in black suits. Narumi goes to his aid, but the men are too strong and he carries Masaru onto a train to escape. Masaru tells Narumi the story of his father's death and huge inheritance, and that Saiga men have always had an interest in Karakuri clockwork puppets. His grandfather told him to take a special suitcase and seek Shirogane for protection if anything should happen to his father. When more men in black suits ambush them on the train, Narumi realizes that they are puppets when one is destroyed. In desperation, Masaru calls out "Shirogane" and a woman appears wearing a harlequin outfit. She opens Masaru's suitcase and the puppet Harlequin pops out. Shirogane manipulates it to attack and destroy the only remaining black-suited puppet. After explaining who she is, Shirogane accompanies Narumi to a local clinic to treat the unconscious Masaru. Meanwhile, one of those pursuing Masaru sends the puppet Pulcinella after the boy.
2	"Promise"; Transliteration: "Yakusoku" (Japanese: 約束)	Masaharu Tomoda; Masatoshi Hakata	Toshiki Inoue	October 18, 2018
Ashihana directs Pulcinella to attack, and Shirogane counters with Harlequin which is more than a match for Pulcinella and it shreds the other puppet. Meanwhile, Ashihana's gang capture Masaru, but fortunately Narumi is there and rescues the boy, although he begins to have a Zonapha attack. Narumi can't make Shirogane or Masaru laugh and desperately he rushes out to make someone laugh, which is only successful after Shirogane beats him up in a convenience store. Shirogane and Masaru move into Narumi's apartment where they settle into a version of domestic life, however they are being watched from outside. Suddenly, the puppet Grimaldi grabs Masaru through a window and escapes with the boy, leaving Shirogane and Narumi standing in the street. They are approached by Eiryo Ashihana who tells them that he is from the Slaughter Team, hired to kill the boy, whereas Masaru was abducted by the Kidnap Team working for another client and he is being taken to the Saiga villa in Karuizawa. Ashihana offers to take them there, however he warns that the villa is full of the late Saiga's heinous Karakuri puppets and their puppeteers.
3	"Abyss"; Transliteration: "Naraku" (Japanese: 奈落)	Daisuke Yoshida	Toshiki Inoue	October 25, 2018
Masaru's uncle Zenji Saiga tells the boy that he is safe with him, but he is suspicious. While the Slaughter Team prepare to attack the Saiga villa, Narumi bursts through the gates with Shirogane in a frontal attack on the Kidnap Team, prompting the Slaughter Team to follow. Shirogane encounters Takami, but Nakata attacks with the Rolling Arms karakuri, however the main door is a trap which destroys the puppet and kills Nakata. Shirogane then releases Harlequin who destroys the door allowing Ashihana and his men inside. Takami then attacks with her karakuri Theogualtier, but Shirogane destroys it with Harlequin. Meanwhile, while hiding from Zenji, Masaru finds notes written by his father saying that Masaru is bait to trigger the destruction of the Kuroga clan who engaged the Saiga to build their puppets. Meanwhile Narumi and Shirogane fall into a trap and Narumi has a Zonapha attack where Shirogane tells him why she cannot laugh and how she became a puppet master. In the tower above, Masaru desperately jumps from a window to escape Zenji, and fortunately lands safely near Ashihana. Masaru then offers to hire Ashihana's Slaughter Team to work for him.
4	"Swirling Tiger"; Transliteration: "Koran" (Japanese: コラン)	Yūichirō Aoki	Toshiki Inoue	November 1, 2018
Ashihana refuses Masaru's offer to work for him, but changes his mind when shown a diary detailing that the Slaughter Team were being used as lab rats by the Saiga. Ashihana uses Grimaldi to burst back into the villa, but Yamanaka trapps Narumi and Shirogane in the basement, so Masaru agrees to become Zenji's son. However, Zenji still plans to kill them, so Masaru savagely attacks him. Meanwhile, as Shirogane tells Narumi about her sad childhood, Masaru and Ashihana use Grimaldi to rescue them. Yamanaka attacks them again, but Narumi and Shirogane cannot defeat him, however Masaru takes control of Harlequin, turning the tide of the battle until suddenly explosives planted in the villa destroy the building. Masaru, Narumi and Shirogane emerge from the wreckage, and Ashihana manages to help Shirogane escape, however Masaru and Narumi remain trapped in the burning building. The next morning, Masaru is alive, but all that remains of Narumi is his left arm.
5	"Circus – Departure"; Transliteration: "Sākasu 〜 Shuppatsu" (Japanese: サーカス〜出発)	Won Chang-hee	Toshiki Inoue	November 8, 2018
Two months later, Masaru has recovered from his injuries and lives with Shirogane who looks after him. She enrolls in the high school next to his school protect him from bullies. However when the bullies try to antagonize Masaru he shrugs off their actions and shows the scars he received in his encounter while he was away. Elsewhere, Mr. Shinobu Nakamachi is about to be evicted for non-payment of rent while he tries to rebuild a circus. At school, Masaru becomes more accepted, and at high school Shirogane becomes popular because of her many talents, including her acrobatic skills. To cheer up Shirogane, Masaru takes her to see Mr. Nakamachi and convinces her to join his circus with Nori and Hiro and their animal handler Liselotte. Elsewhere, Narumi lays unconscious in intensive care, missing his left arm.
6	"Hell"; Transliteration: "Jigoku" (Japanese: 地獄)	Yoshihisa Matsumoto	Toshiki Inoue	November 15, 2018
Narumi awakes in a hospital in Illinois in the United States, with amnesia and a prosthetic left arm. His savior introduces himself as Guy Christophe Resh. Narumi finds that the hospital run by Dr. Banhart is a research facility and houses 2,000 children suffering from Zonapha, but the staff are also suffering to ensure that they are always smiling to prevent the children from having Zonapha attacks. He also learns that in the final stages, the Zonapha sufferer cannot die, and he sees older children lying comatose, caught between life and death. Resh explains that automata are used by the Midnight Circus to spread the Zonapha syndrome and he asks Narumi to become a Shirogane and help him fight them. He tells Narumi that the last amount of Aqua Vitae which was created by an alchemist many years ago was used to heal him. Lucille Verrneuil enters and announces that Paulmann and Anselmus are attacking the school so Resh goes out to confront them. He uses his Karakuri Olympia to attack the automata and then Narumi joins him to effectively finish them off.
7	"Demonic (Note: This episode has an English title only)"	Shigeru Ueda	Shōji Yonemura	November 22, 2018
Paulmann and Anselmus attack Narumi injuring him, but with his rapid healing ability due to the Aqua Vitae, Narumi is able to destroy them both. To protect the children, Narumi accepts Resh's offer to become a Shirogane and fight the automata. Meanwhile, Shirogane is performing as a clown with the Nakamachi Circus and she is approached by Vilma who challenges her to a contest of skills. Vilma befriends her, but later that she night corners Masaru at the circus camp site and prepares to kill him. Vilma is surprised when Shirogane suddenly arrives and intervenes, but Vilma immobilizes her with her throwing knives. However Shirogane's body recovers enough to fight back with Harlequin and defeats Vilma. Later Vilma is so impressed by the loyalty of Shirogane and the resolve of Masaru that she decides to join them in the Nakamachi Circus.
8	"Moment's Beginning, Moment's End"; Transliteration: "Shun no Hajimari to Owari" (Japanese: 瞬の始まりと終わり)	Junichi Fujise; Daisuke Yoshida	Shōji Yonemura	November 29, 2018
To earn extra money and publicity for the Nakamachi Circus, Shirogane enters a beauty contest at a beach-side fair. As they prepare the circus for opening day, Masaru convinces Lise to perform again and Shirogane reminisces to Vilma about Narumi. Meanwhile, Guy and Lucille fly with Narumi to China to confront the automata, but a group of ten automata hijack the airplane. They challenge Narumi to defeat them without causing them to explode which would kill everyone on board. Narumi defeats them, but then the airplane is attacked by a large number of Mr. Spazza's insectoid automata. Guy exits the plane to deal with Mr. Spazza and the insectoids while Lucille tries to the land the airplane in the bay. Meanwhile, the Nakamachi Circus has its grand opening, however it is interrupted by the airplane crashing into the water nearby, causing everyone to run outside. In the airplane, the automaton Magdalen is still operational and prepares to attack Masaru and others to obtain their blood, but Shirogane intervenes to stop it. Suddenly Magdalen is destroyed and Shirogane and Masaru appear to see Narumi through the flames and smoke.
9	"Memories"; Transliteration: "Kioku" (Japanese: 記憶)	Masatoshi Hakata	Shōji Yonemura	December 6, 2018
Following the airplane crash, Shirogane rescues her wounded former teacher Guy, and helps nurse him back to health. She tells Masaru about her past with Guy and how Narumi caused her to become more human instead of just a puppet. Disturbed by dreams about Narumi, Masaru leaves quietly to search for him. Meanwhile, Narumi, Lucille and Ming-Xia are deep in the mountains of China searching for the Midnight Circus. They find Ming-Xia's father Liang Jian-Feng suffering from Zonapha syndrome at a spring flowing with Aqua Vitae. He tells them about his Bai family ancestors of 200 years earlier, the brothers Yin and Jin, who went to study alchemy in Prague to improve their puppetry skills and Narumi realizes that he knows the story. The brothers encountered the beautiful woman Francine who eventually caused friction between the brothers who both fell in love with her.
10	"Francine"; Transliteration: "Furanshīnu" (Japanese: フランシーヌ)	Masaharu Tomoda	Shōji Yonemura	December 13, 2018
Narumi continues the story using Yin's memories within him. Jin was devastated when Francine agreed to marry Yin, and he abducted her and disappeared. Nine years later Yin found Jin in Quiberon, but Francine was imprisoned by the villagers because of a rare disease. Yin worked to perfect Aqua Vitae to cure her, but just as he succeeded, Francine was killed when the prison was set ablaze. Twenty Three years later, Jin created an automaton in her image called Lady Francine and injected it with Aqua Vitae to bring her to life. He then created clowns to make her laugh, but they failed, so he released the Zonapha syndrome into the village, forcing them to make her laugh or suffer a living death. Lucille reveals she was one of the villagers who suffered at the antics of the murderous clowns. Six years later, Yin returned and sacrificed himself to activate the Aqua Vitae and save the villagers. When Lucille drank the water, she acquired Yin's memories and knowledge along with the puppet Harlequin, and vowed to crush Jin's automata. Suddenly Pantalone appears, seeking the Aqua Vitae for Lady Francine's automatons, but Liang Jian-Feng sets off a massive explosion, destroying both himself and the spring.
11	"Fanfare"; Transliteration: "Fanfāre" (Japanese: ファンファーレ)	Kōhei Hatano	Shōji Yonemura	December 20, 2018
In Harvest, Maine, a group of Shirogane-Os prepare to attack the Midnight Circus which they have located in the Sahara Desert of North Africa. Narumi, Lucille and Ming-Xia travel to the location. Meanwhile, earlier in Deauville, France, George Laroche, a Shirogane-O, offers the bored Kuroga puppeteer and assassin, Ashihana, an opportunity for action. Outside the Midnight Circus tent in the desert, Narumi's group meet the Faceless Commander and his hoard of Shirogane-Os. Les Quatre Pionniers offer to match their four automatons in one-on-one battles with the best of the Shirogane. Suddenly, the Shirogane-O, Zed, charges into the tent and quickly destroys two automatons, but their greatest hero, Merry-Go-Round Olsen, is chosen to challenge him. Olsen easily dispatches Zed and another Shirogane-O with its spinning blades. Rockenfield suggests that Narumi goes next, and he proceeds to smash the device with his bare hands. The next automaton challengers are the acrobat brothers, Orazio and Pedrolino, who are met by Fatima and Ming-Xia who is given drops of blood by Lucille to counteract the Zonapha-filled atmosphere. In the ensuing see-saw battle, the Shirogane win, but Dottore opens a trap-door and they fall into a chamber to be confronted by another challenge.
12	"The Faceless Commander"; Transliteration: "Kao Nashi" (Japanese: 顔無し)	Shigeru Ueda	Toshiki Inoue	December 27, 2018
Fatima and Ming-Xia are deposited into a portable medical capsule for treatment, while the remainder of the group are confronted by two doors which supposedly lead to Lady Francine. Narumi, with the Shirogane Rockenfield, Malina (Lina) and Tor, take one entrance with steps leading downwards in total darkness, while the others pass through the second door. They enter a chamber where they must fight each other to determine the who will pass further. Meanwhile, George and Eiryo travel to the Sahara by helicopter. Below the Midnight Circus complex, Narumi and the Shirogane are confronted by a series of diabolical and deadly traps. The Faceless Commander sacrifices himself to save Narumi who eventually meets up with Tor, Timbavati, Rockenfield and Malina. They now must face Les Quatre Pionniers in a contest before Lady Francine.
13	"Lucille"; Transliteration: "Rushīru" (Japanese: ルシール)	Shinichirō Ushijima	Shōji Yonemura	January 10, 2019
Tor, Timbavati, Rockenfield and Malina unpack their marionettes, and attack the Quatre Pionniers. The badly wounded Narumi tries to reach Doll Francine, but he is too weak. The Pionniers appear to gain the upper hand until Lucille arrives with reinforcements: Fatima, Ming-Xia, Eiryo and George. Lucille surprises them by unveiling a Francine marionette, Lucille's daughter Angelina, stopping the entire Midnight Circus in their tracks. Lucille convinces Dottore to disavow Francine, causing his synthetic body fluids to drain away, but not before he fatally cuts Lucille with his deadly hat, causing her to crystallize and disintegrate. Meanwhile Tor is badly wounded, and self-destructs to eliminate as many automata as possible, enabling Narumi to be treated in the portable medical capsule. When Timbavati tries to reach Lady Francine, Columbine intercepts him and stabs through his body with her Mains Blanches Immaculeés, however he uses his Mamba's Tower of Venomous Fangs to bite himself and then use his Shirogane blood to neutralize Columbine's synthetic body fluids. Columbine melts away as Tor crystallizes and disintegrates.
14	"By the Sea, in the Dead of Night"; Transliteration: "Yofuke no Umi" (Japanese: 夜更けの海)	Won Chang-hee	Toshiki Inoue	January 17, 2019
Pantalone and Arlecchino manage to move enough to reach and destroy the Francine marionette, and then George when he attacks them. Meanwhile the shirogane doctor sacrifices his life to save Narumi on the operating table. Fatima then attacks Pantalone and Arlecchino with her scorpion-like marionette Spinettina, but she is easily defeated. However, Narumi regains consciousness and immediately attacks and defeats Pantalone with his enhanced body. Arlecchino then shoots jets of flames at Narumi, but Fatima lives long enough to see Narumi cut Arlecchino to pieces. Before Narumi destroys her, Lady Francine reveals that she is only a copy, and the real Francine, the source of Zonapha syndrome, is elsewhere. Later, Narumi tracks down Shirogane, and immediately attacks her, accusing her of being Francine. He says that another survivor of Clogue village in Quiberon, who is now head of Fou Industries, told him that Shirogane was created from Aqua Vitae made by Francine. However, just as Narumi prepares to kill Shirogane, he recalls his early time with her and Masaru, and walks away.
15	"Back to the Starting Point"; Transliteration: "Hajimari no Basho e" (Japanese: はじまりの場所へ)	Sō Toyama	Toshiki Inoue	January 31, 2019
As Masaru visits the ruins of his family home in Karuizawa, he recalls past; from the time his mother died to the assassination attempts when he met Shirogane and Narumi. He is greeted by the caretaker who gives him a letter and a set of keys to an underground room, left by Sadayoshi Saiga 30 years ago. Masaru opens the room which triggers a recording telling Masaru that the room has been left in case the memory transfer failed and informs Masaru that he is in fact his father reborn. He exits the room and is attacked by puppeteers of Kuroga village with the ninja marionette, Shogetsu, believing him to be Sadayoshi. Masaru retreats, and with the assistance of Guri-pon, he activates the massive marionette, Goyellemes and defeats Shogetsu. The Kuroga attack again with another marionette, but Mararu counters with the lighter Captain Nemo and slices it to pieces. Masaru then activate the third marionette and tries to escape, but is captured by the Kuroga and brought before the remains of his grandfather Shōji which appears to be still conscious.
16	"Encounter"; Transliteration: "Deai" (Japanese: 出会い)	Masatoshi Hakata	Toshiki Inoue	February 7, 2019
Shōji refuses to believe that Masaru's mind has not been taken over by Sadayoshi and Masaru is forced to drink Shōji's blood which contains his memories. Suddenly, Masaru begins to recall how many years ago, Shōji was learning swordsmanship at Miura Dojo in Nagasaki while also studying to be a doctor under Dr. Bai Yin. Together they completed a marionette which Shōji named a Shirogane. While treating a sick Mr. Nakayama, Shōji encountered a woman who intervened and took over. She was called Tohno-dayu, although her real name was Angelina. By accident, she revealed that she had Bai Yin's marionette, Arlequin, when she enabled Shōji to escape from a burning building. Later, Shōji tracked her down, where she told him about her past and the vial of Aqua Vitae which was given to her. Realizing that he was in love with her, Shōji drank the liquid, vowing to spend eternity with her.
17	"Visitors"; Transliteration: "Otozureshi Mono" (Japanese: 訪れし者)	Daisuke Yoshida	Toshiki Inoue	February 14, 2019
Shōji tells Masaru that Sadayoshi was not his son, and that he and Angelina started to create their own marionettes. The shirogane, Dean Maistre arrived to pick up the marionettes for Lucille, and they later adopted Dean as their son, naming him Sadayoshi. However some time later, Angelina became pregnant. Back in the present, Guy arrives at the underground room and tells Masaru the story of how he contracted Zonapha and was abandoned by his mother and how Lucille turned him into a shirogane. Years later, Lucille sent him on a mission to see Angelina at Kuroga village and extract her Soft Stone to convert Zonapha sufferers into shirogane. Angelina refused to give up the stone and used Arlequin to fight Guy's Olympia, defeating him, but then welcomed him into her household. Then, another Shōji memory shows Masaru how Shōji encountered the Francine automaton whose creator abandoned her because she could not laugh. Shōji adjusted her to make her less powerful and took her home to meet Angelina who welcomed her. Shortly thereafter, Angelina gave birth to a baby girl.
18	"A Smile"; Transliteration: "Bishō" (Japanese: 微笑)	Yoshihisa Matsumoto	Toshiki Inoue	February 21, 2019
Shōji's memory of the past continues. He named his daughter Éléonore and the birth of the baby caused Guy to be conflicted over whether to remove the Soft Stone from Angelina. Meanwhile, Francine wanted to be dismantled because she could not fulfill her purpose to smile and felt that she was missing a vital gear. She and Guy were both affected by the birth of Éléonore and the happiness she brought. Suddenly, automata surrounded the house searching for the Soft Stone, but when Francine ordered them to leave they did not recognize her and attacked. Angelina revealed that the Soft Stone was now inside Éléonore and she entrusted the baby to Francine who escaped. Francine was chased and heavily damaged by some of the automata. She fell into a well with Éléonore who automatically who turned the water into Aqua Vitae which began to consume Francine. Back at the house, Angelina fought the automata with Shōji and Guy while pretending to have the Soft Stone inside her. However, Angelina was mortally wounded by the automata and being both human and shirogane, she crystallized as she died. Shōji continued to fight while Guy followed Francine and he arrived at the well where he realized that Francine had given her life to save Éléonore.
19	"The Truth Behind the Shadow"; Transliteration: "Kage no Shōtai" (Japanese: 影の正体)	Shinichirō Ushijima	Shōji Yonemura	February 28, 2019
Following revelations of the past, Guy again asserts that Masaru is Sadayoshi. Masaru denies it and runs off and encounters Éléonore Shirogane, but he is attacked by Guy and falls down a cliff unconscious. Masaru then recalls the memories of Shōji, from the saving of Éléonore and her life in the Quiberon orphanage under the care and training of Lucille. Then the betrayal of Sadayoshi by using his son Masaru as a vehicle for his memories so that he could essentially become immortal. However, Shōji was already prepared and destroyed the memory data back at Karuizawa causing Sadayoshi to try to kill him. Shōji survived but it was announced that he had died to protect him from Sadayoshi. Meanwhile, Sadayoshi sent Éléonore to join a circus to keep her away from Masaru.
20	"Black Sun"; Transliteration: "Kuroi Taiyō" (Japanese: 黒い太陽)	Won Chang-hee	Shōji Yonemura	March 7, 2019
Masaru admits that he now understands more of his past and recalls that on the night of his father's death, he collapsed after drinking cocoa. As Sadayoshi drove from Karuizawa, downloading his memories into the unconscious Masaru, he encountered Shōji on the road. While Shōji who attacked him, Guy and the Shirogane saved Masaru. As the car crashed, Shōji and Sadayoshi were flipped into a bath of acid, killing Sadayoshi and badly damaging Shōji. Back in the present at Karuizawa, just as Guy prepares to kill Masaru, Daiki reveals himself to be the Faceless Commander and claims that Masauru is his son. He explains how he is the reincarnation of both Bai Jin and Sadayoshi Saiga, and he attacks Guy and Shōji. Appearing like a powerful dark sun, he then prepares to take Masaru who valiantly fights back, however Éléonore suddenly appears and takes a blow meant for Masaru. The Faceless Commander then escapes to a waiting airship, taking Éléonore and Arleqiuin with him, challenging Masaru to follow him. Meanwhile, Shōji's remaining body crystallizes as he dies in Masaru's arms. In the afterlife, Shōji encounters Angelina who has been waiting for him since her death, and they keep their promise to spend eternity together.
21	"Silver Goddess"; Transliteration: "Gin'iro no Megami" (Japanese: 銀色の女神)	Park Jae-ik	Toshiki Inoue	March 14, 2019
Masaru mourns the death of Shōji as the members of the Nakamachi Circus arrive. Suddenly, the villagers fall victim to the Zonapha syndrome, and the Faceless Commander appears calling himself the god Deus. He announces that he has distributed the "sliver goddess" Artemis to destroy all humans. Masaru mounts the flying Jack-O-Lantern puppet and attacks Artemis, but discovers that each Artemis is composed of the Zonapha pathogen, a dust-sized automaton Faceless calls Apollyon. Guy also gives chase with Lise, but he is stopped by the Cupidia automaton which brings Guy down with his arrows. However just as Cupidia is about to kill Guy, it is destroyed by Narumi. Guy then uses Olympus to carry Narumi to the Zonapha Syndrome Research Institute where Fou the jester has completed "Harry", a machine to drive out the Apollyon bugs. Meanwhile, Faceless has reconstructed, Arlecchino, Pantalone and Colombine for his amusement. Narumi and Guy arrive at the Institute, where they meet up with Ming-Xia, Tom, George and Eiryo, but they come under attack from Faceless' automatons. Inside, Ming-Xia finds all the staff dead, killed by automaton Gambler Jones who attacks her and captures Tom as a hostage. Meanwhile, Arlecchino, Pantalone and Colombine still remain loyal to their creator, Francine, and when they take food to Éléonore, they discover she looks exactly like Francine.
22	"Headed to "Harry"!!"; Transliteration: "'Harī' e Mukau!!" (Japanese: 「ハリー」へ向かう！！)	Michiru Itabisashi	Toshiki Inoue	March 21, 2019
The automaton Gambler Jones forces Ming-Xia to gamble against him to save Tom Jones, and she loses every time. Eventually she makes one last bet on the toss of a coin, and before it hits the ground she attacks and destroys the automaton, saving Tom. Narumi and Guy soon arrive and join her to look for "Harry". Meanwhile, George and Eiryo encounter a group of children who are initially scared of them, until George plays a happy melody on a piano. When they go outside George encounters Bola Misteriosa, a powerful shirogane while Eiryo encounters Pantalone, who lets him pass, however Eiryo decides to challenge him.
23	"The Demon's Return"; Transliteration: "Akuma Futatabi" (Japanese: 悪魔再び)	Masatoshi Hakata	Toshiki Inoue	March 28, 2019
While Eiryo fights Pantalone, Bola Misteriosa defeats George and explains that he joined Faceless to rid the beautiful planet Earth of the humans who contribute nothing and consume everything. Eiryo recalls that Ashihana said because automata were created to entertain humans, they can only move at human speed when they are present, and that is why humans use marionettes rather than machines to fight them. However, Pantalone is too fast and impales Eiryo with Polichinelle's own sword. Eiryo remembers that he has some of George's shirogane blood, and uses it in last assault on Pantalone. Pantalone prepares to kill Eiryo but purposely misses as he remembers Francine's words that she will never forgive him if he kills a human. George fights back in a last desperate effort against Bola Misteriosa's Wunderkugel and finally manages to destroy him, but George dies just as the badly wounded Eiryo reaches him. Meanwhile inside, Narumi attacks like a demon and destroys the automata threatening the children. He then fights his way with Ming-Xia to where Dr. Banhart and other scientists were working on Harry and encounters the automata Blom Blom Low and Drill September. Back outside, scores of automata descend to feed on the humans inside, but they are confronted by Guy with Olympia.
24	"Escape"; Transliteration: "Dasshutsu e" (Japanese: 脱出へ)	Yūki Nishihata	Toshiki Inoue	April 4, 2019
Ming-Xia tackles Blom Blom Low, leader of the assault team, while Narumi attacks Drill September. Narumi defeats his opponent, but Blom badly wounds Ming-Xia. Narumi attacks Blom and only manages to defeat the automaton with the aid of components within his enhanced body provided by Timbavati, Tor and Rockenfield. Meanwhile, Eiryo spares Pantalone, saying that he should follow Francine's orders and not harm humans. Guy vainly continues to hold off the automata while Eiryo uses the Long-legged Clown Express train to tunnel into the complex to retrieve Harry, Narumi, the remaining humans and the children. The train exits to find Guy under siege and Pantalone defending him. Pantalone volunteers to hold off the automata so that everyone can escape in the Long-legged Clown Express, but at the last minute, Narumi saves him and they both catch the departing train. Meanwhile, Masaru, Lise and the bird Guri-pon are still chasing Faceless's airship.
25	"At Mont Saint-Michel"; Transliteration: "Mon-San-Missheru Nite" (Japanese: モン・サン・ミッシェルにて)	Daisuke Yoshida	Shōji Yonemura	April 11, 2019
Masaru, Lise and the bird Guri-pon continue chasing Faceless's airship, but they are shot down by Faceless's jester Harlequin, and crash land on Mont Saint-Michel. Aboard the airship, also heading for the island, Arlequino gives Éléonore a tour where she meets automata like Captain Graziano who espouses his ancestry of aristocratic French families and Brighella who interested in martial arts. They all who exist to serve Faceless and none have any empathy or capacity for joy. Meanwhile on the island, Masaru and Lise are confronted by Dr. Lao and his beasts. Lise stays to hold them off while Masaru escapes. He enters the monastery but is caught by the resurrected Colombine who gives him an opportunity to save Éléonore. Suddenly, Naya Steele, leader of the Android-O's on the island, disables Colombine, but after Masaru takes pity and holds her, she retaliates and decides to help him. She leads him to the underground facility where the original human bodies of the Shirogane-O's are stored. Meanwhile, Lise is saved from a beast by Arlequino, but when she humbly thanks him and smiles, it causes an unfamiliar feeling in him. Lise evades the beasts, but after entering the monastery, she trips in the dark and falls into a deep pit.
26	"Animal Show"; Transliteration: "Animaru Shō" (Japanese: アニマル・ショウ)	Kōhei Hatano	Shōji Yonemura	April 18, 2019
Lise finds herself in a pit surrounded by wild beasts that have been created and cast away as failures by Dr. Lao; Gorgon, Basilisk, Unicorn and Cerberus. However, Lise uses her inner strength to tame the beasts and uses them to break out. Unicorn fatally wounds Dr. Lao, and as he dies, he reveals that Unicorn has the transplanted brain of the tiger called Beast, who killed Lise's sister. Elsewhere, Faceless beats Éléonore, trying to make her hate him. His devious plan is to possess Masaru's body and then defeat Faceless to earn Éléonore's love. Meanwhile, Colombine explains to Masaru that the chamber contains the precious bodies of the Shirogane-O's which are held in safety while their expendable mechanical bodies carry out their activities in the real world. Suddenly, Colombine and Masaru are found by Naya and the Android-O's who trap them. However, Masaru and Colombine had earlier set the capsules containing the real bodies to open and the Android-O's are horrified to be confronted by their horribly aged human bodies which emerge from the capsules. Colombine helps free Masaru during the confusion, but Masaru is attacked by Naya, angry that her real body has aged while her shirogane body stayed young. Masaru uses his dismantling skills to disable her, releasing her vital fluids and she dies along with her human body. Masaru exits the chamber but is then confronted by Faceless and his new master automatons.
27	"Download"; Transliteration: "Daunrōdo" (Japanese: 転送(ダウンロード))	Nana Fujiwara	Toshiki Inoue	April 25, 2019
Masaru confronts Faceless and his three master automatons when suddenly Guri-pon delivers the marionette Harlequin to help him fight. Meanwhile, Lise bursts through the cordon of automatons and arrives in a chamber containing a rocket ship which Arlequino tells her that Faceless intends to use to transport himself and Éléonore to an orbiting space station called Alpha. Harlequin chains Éléonore into the rocket and the countdown to launch begins. Colombine then joins Lise to fight the three master automatons enabling Masaru to chase Faceless. Faceless defeats Masaru and places him into his download device to transfer his consciousness into Masaru. Five minutes later, he inhabits Masaru's body, and they stage a mock fight in front of Éléonore in which Faceless allows himself to be defeated. However, the old Faceless begins to suspect that he does not fully control Masaru's body which may still have retained some of the boy's consciousness.
28	"This Little Piggy"; Transliteration: "Buta-chan wa Aru Ite Itta" (Japanese: ぶたちゃんはあるいていった)	Won Chang-hee	Toshiki Inoue	May 2, 2019
Faceless invades Masaru's consciousness, but finds Masaru there who asks Faceless questions about Aqua Vitae. Masaru then reveals that he has regained control of his body because he drank some of Éléonore's blood. Because she is the host of the soft stone, he now has superior recuperative powers and was able to resist Faceless' memory download which his body saw as a disease. Meanwhile outside, Colombine fights the new Diamantina automaton which looks like "Goldilocks" and can generate an unlimited number of teddy bears with sharp teeth and claws. The countdown to launch continues and in desperation, Masaru dismantles Éléonore to free her from the chains that bind her. As the rocket launches, Masaru and Éléonore manage to exit the command capsule, leaving Faceless travelling alone into space. Colombine uses her remaining powers to create a soft landing just before she is engulfed in a fiery explosion. Narumi arrives at Mont Saint-Michel in the Long-legged Clown Express train and meets Arlequino who hands him the unconscious Lise. Meanwhile, Masaru finds the remains of Colombine after she was caught in the explosion and decimated by the Diamantina automaton. She is happy to be held by Masaru as he embraces her and sheds tears for the sacrifice she made.
29	"What Shirogane Did"; Transliteration: "Shirogane no Yatta Koto" (Japanese: しろがねのやったこと)	Park Jae-ik	Shōji Yonemura	May 9, 2019
Éléonore finds herself with the children, medical staff survivors of the Zonapha Syndrome Research Institute, but Fou, Narumi and their allies want to ensure that she is not loyal to Faceless. She passes the test, but she is still mistrusted by many survivors, especially by Ming Xia who was wounded by Faceless' automatons. Meanwhile, Faceless has a new look, that of a handsome young man, and broadcasts from the orbiting satellite, saying that he has ordered every Apollyon to accelerate the spread of the Zonapha Syndrome which will kill everyone on Earth in two weeks. Fou says their only option is to get him to stop the Zonapha bugs and plans to send Harry up to the space station from a launch pad 10,000 away in remote Russia. To convince Ming Xia of Éléonore's genuineness, Guy takes her to the center's water treatment facility where he shows her that shirogane Éléonore has been draining her Aqua Vitae enriched blood into the drinking water daily, to help heal all the sufferers from Zonapha Syndrome.
30	"Pietà"	Masatoshi Hakata	Shōji Yonemura	May 16, 2019
Narumi is still committed to killing Éléonore, so Guy challenges him to a duel. However, Narumi discovers that Guy is dying because his body beginning to crystallize so Narumi calls off the duel. Meanwhile, Masaru discovers that Narumi is still alive after he meets the teacher Sharon Montfort who reveals that she was saved by him after her school bus was attacked by automata, so Masaru flies off to find him. Back at Fou's headquarters, Narumi, Éléonore and the Nakamachi Circus are farewelled as they prepare to take Harry by train to the launch pad while Fou and the other humans depart in helicopters for the Bodny Cosmodrome. Guy Christoph Resh stays behind with Olympia to stall Captain Graziano and the automata when they attack. Masaru finds Guy, but sees that his body has almost completely crystallized. Dying, Guy sends Mararu after the train and sets off an explosion, destroying himself and the 3,000 automata, and sealing off the railway tunnel.
31	"Black Shooting Star"; Transliteration: "Kuro no Ryūsei" (Japanese: 黒の流星)	Seiya Sugihata	Toshiki Inoue	May 23, 2019
Captain Graziano and his partner survive the explosion and are joined by more automata; Wild West Jane and Lady Spider who are being carried by Keniss and Anoss. Meanwhile, Vilma Thorne hands out her knives to the other Nakamachi Circus members. The knives have been tinted with Éléonore's blood causing them to be deadly to the automata. The members of the Nakamachi Circus share stories of their past. Shinobu talks about his generous wife Fusae who took in the orphans, Nori and Hiro, but died during a high wire performance. Vilma talks about her brother Jim who died from the Zonapha Syndrome before they could perform as a knife-throwing team. Wild West Jane and Lady Spider catch up with Masaru who manages to stop Anoss and Lady Spider. Keniss and Wild West Jane catch up with the train, firing Zonapha-filled bullets. Vilma returns fire, but is no match for Wild West Jane's explosive bullets and she is badly wounded. At the last moment, the two women throw their knives at each other, both hitting the mark and ending the lives of Vilma and Wild West Jane. Masaru arrives and destroys Keniss as he sees Vilma fall from the train.
32	"Valediction"; Transliteration: "Itomagoi" (Japanese: 暇乞い)	Daisuke Yoshida	Toshiki Inoue	May 30, 2019
Shinobe Nakamachi consoles Masaru over the death of Vilma, and reveals that members of the Nakamichi Circus have seen Éléonore's memories. Her 90 years of life was spent spilling her blood fighting automata while performing as a circus entertainer until she met Narumi which changed her life. Masaru is prevented from seeing her as she spends time with the Narumi before he is sent into space to confront Faceless although Narumi is still angry with Éléonore and keeps her at arm's-length. Suddenly, the Nakamichis see Lady Spider following the train with Captain Graziano. As they prepare to fight them off, Shinobu reveals that Fou said that if automata are not confronted by humans with weapons, they instinctively try to learn their tricks. Meanwhile, Arlequino and Pantalone detect the presence of Bringhella and Harlequin who are planning to ambush the train and seek Éléonore's Permission to attack and stop them. She agrees, but also orders them to return alive.
33	"The Nakamachi Trio vs Lady Spider"; Transliteration: "Nakamachi San'nin VS Redi・Supaidā" (Japanese: 仲町三人VSレディ・スパイダー)	Yūki Nishihata; Tomoya Shinoda	Toshiki Inoue	June 6, 2019
As the train continues towards the Russian launch pad, the Nakamachi Trio of Shinobu, Nori and Hiro attack Lady Spider, but she foils them by changing her face to look like Fusae. Desperately, Shinobu and Hiro try Fou's strategy and perform circus tricks but it only momentarily distracts Lady Spider from her assault. However, this provides enough time for Nori to separate their carriage from the train and blow up the tracks, and the trio combine to stab and kill Lady Spider with one of Vilma's deadly knives. Meanwhile, Arlequino and Pantalone intercept Bringhella and Harlequin in a nearby hilltop. Arlequino uses powerful sound waves produced by his lute to press Bringhella, but the automaton releases hidden rockets and blasts Arlequino, destroying him. Harlequin also defeats Pantalone and then confesses that he is in love with Francine and wants the reincarnation, Éléonore, for himself. This causes Pantalone to roar out laughing and in a blind rage, Harlequin tears him to pieces. Harlequin then leaps onto the train and as Narumi prepares to fight him, Éléonore steps in front and vows to protect him.
34	"Rearguard"; Transliteration: "Senaka o Mamoru Mono" (Japanese: 背中を守る者)	Won Chang-hee	Toshiki Inoue	June 13, 2019
Harlequin goes to attack Narumi, but Éléonore insists on fighting the automaton herself, willing to sacrifice her life for Narumi. As they fight, Harlequin drags Éléonore from the train, but then Bringhella arrives, and he engages Narumi in a martial arts show of strength. However, when Bringhella fires a missile, it reminds Narumi of his early days learning martial arts, and he counters with a missile-like punch of his own, defeating Bringhella. Meanwhile, Masaru on the Jack-O-Lantern puppet, continues his battle with Captain Graziano and uses the martial arts skills of his grandfather which were downloaded into his consciousness to defeat Graziano. The train finally arrives at the launch pad, and Narumi prepares to fly into orbit in the space shuttle, but they are attacked by a hoard of automata. Narumi starts to fight them and realizes that someone is defending his rear, but doesn't see that it's Masaru. After they defeat all the automata, Narumi turns to see who his ally is, and Masaru blinds him with a camera flashbulb.
35	"Embrace"; Transliteration: "Hōyō" (Japanese: 抱擁)	Michiru Itabisashi	Toshiki Inoue	June 20, 2019
Masaru admits that he temporarily blinded Narumi so that he could travel in the space shuttle to confront Faceless himself, intending to leave Narumi on Earth so he could make Éléonore happy. Lise convinces everyone to let Masaru go, however she separately bids him a tearful goodbye. Meanwhile in the township, Harlequin had dressed Éléonore in a wedding dress while she was unconscious, and he now pursues her. Although weak from loss of blood, Éléonore prepares to fight him again, but the blinded Narumi arrives, and with Éléonore directing him, he angrily smashes Harlequin to pieces. As the rocket carrying the shuttle takes off, Narumi and Éléonore embrace and declare their love for each other. They are happily watched by the remnants of Arlequino and Pantalone before they finally succumb to their injuries. Meanwhile, Eiryō Ashihana stops the automaton Pinball-K from firing a cannon at the rocket, but is fatally shot in the process. Masaru finally arrives at the space station and finds that it contains the facsimile of an old town which is filled with automatons that look like Francine. He encounters Faceless in the body of a young man who looks like Bai Jin which he cloned from his old human body's cells, and Masaru pleads with him for the cure to Zonapha.
36	"The Curtain Falls"; Transliteration: "Heimaku" (Japanese: 閉幕)	Satoshi Nishimura; Junichi Fujise; Masatoshi Hakata	Toshiki Inoue	June 27, 2019
Masaru pleads with Faceless/Bai Jin for the cure to Zonapha, but he refuses and produces a new version of Arlequin which attacks Masaru's Jack-O-Lantern. Faceless accuses Masaru of loving Éléonore, and prepares to kill him out of jealousy. Suddenly, Diamantina arrives and destroys all the Francine automata and then demands that Faceless admits that he loves her. He refuses and dismantles her instead, but as she grinds to a halt, she stabs him and sets of a series of explosions within the space station which begins to head earthward. Faceless surprisingly agrees to help Masaru redirect the falling complex away from inhabited areas by combining the remnants of Arelquin and Jack-O-Lantern to redirect a thrust engine. For a moment, Faceless feels like a big brother helping a younger sibling, just as Bai Yin did for him. Masaru again pleads with Faceless for the cure. As he begins to bleed badly from his stab wound, Faceless reveals that Éléonore's singing changes the Zonapha bugs' deadly mode into becoming a cure. Éléonore begins singing and Masaru returns to Earth's surface an escape shuttle, leaving Faceless and his creation Guri-pon which decides to stay with him. With Éléonore's song, humanity is saved. Six years later, Narumi and Éléonore take their own small circus to war-torn areas of Earth, and an older Masaru saves a pair of children from criminals while wearing a bear suit.
