= Northwind =

Northwind may refer to:

== Companies ==
- Shorthand for Northern Power Systems, a wind energy company
- Northwind (company), a Canadian computer software company that develops property management systems

== Music ==
- Northwind (album), a 2006 album by the Swedish band Falconer
- Northwinds, a 1978 album by David Coverdale

== Other ==
- Northwind, a novel by Gary Paulsen published in 2022
- Northwind (Australian rules football team), Canada's national Australian rules football team
- Northwind (character), a fictional character in the DC Universe
- USCGC Northwind (WAGB-282), a United States Coast Guard icebreaker
- Northwind Glacier, a large glacier in Antarctica
- Northwind Traders, a database sample that is shipped along with the Microsoft Access application.

== See also ==
- North wind
