= Maistre =

Maistre is a surname.

It may refer to:

== Persons ==
- Joseph de Maistre (1753 – 1821), French-language Savoyard political philosopher and diplomat
- Casimir Maistre (1867-1957), French geographer
- François Maistre (1925-2016), French actor
- François-Xavier Maistre (1705-1789), Savoyard politician, father of Joseph and Xavier, from Aspremont, Alpes-Maritimes, France
- John A. Gauci-Maistre K.M. (born 1947), Maltese businessman
- Paul Maistre (1858-1922), French general who fought in WWI
- Richard Master a.k.a. Richard Maistres (died 1588), English physician to Queen Elizabeth I

== Fictional characters ==
- Dean Maistre, a character from Karakuri Circus, see List of Karakuri Circus characters

== See also ==
- Mastre (disambiguation)
- Maitre (surname)
- Le Maistre (surname)
- De Maistre (surname)
