= De Maistre =

de Maistre, Demaistre, or deMaistre is a surname. Notable people with the surname include:

People with this name include:

- Gilles de Maistre (born 1960), French screenwriter
- Henriette-Marie de Sainte-Marie Baronne Almaury de Maistre (1809–1875), French composer
- Joseph de Maistre (1753–1821), Savoyard jurist & political conservative
- Roy De Maistre (1894–1968), Australian artist
- Rodolphe de Maistre (1789–1866), French military man
- Xavier de Maistre (1763–1852), French military man and writer
- Xavier de Maistre (harpist) (born 1973), French harpist

== See also ==
- Le Maistre (surname)
- Maistre (surname)
