= Anteris Technologies =

Australian biotechnology company

Anteris Technologies Limited
- Formerly: Allied Healthcare Group (2011–2013); Admedus (2013–2020)
- Type: Public
- Traded as: ASX: AVR
- Industry: Biotechnology
- Headquarters: Toowong, Australia
- Website: anteristech.com

Anteris Technologies Limited is an Australian biotechnology company.

== History ==
Anteris originates from the merger of Allied Medical and BioMD. Allied Medical was a company spun out of mining company Fortescue in 2005 which focused on selling medical equipment such as catheters. It entered the biotechnology space in July 2010 when it purchased a 38.6 per cent stake in Brisbane-based Coridon for A$3 million. By February 2011, its stake increased to 55 per cent. In February 2011, Allied Medical agreed to a reverse takeover deal with BioMD, a listed biotech company. The takeover was completed in June 2011 resulting in the combined company, Allied Healthcare Group, listing on the Australian Securities Exchange (ASX).

In September 2012, Allied raised $10.4 million to launch CardioCel across Europe. In November 2013, Allied Healthcare changed its name to Admedus. In December 2013, Admedus purchased a manufacturing site in Malaga to scale-up production of CardioCel and support the development and manufacture of additional regenerative tissue products.

In October 2019, Admedus sold its CardioCel and VascuCel patch business to U.S.-based LeMaitre Vascular. Under the agreement, Admedus received A$22.8 million upfront followed by deferred payments of $1 million each at 12 months and at 36 months. Additionally, the company could receive up to $11.4 million in earn-out payments. Admedus retained the right to manufacture CardioCel and VascuCel products at its Malaga facility for LeMaitre over the following three years. In May 2020, Admedus changed its name to Anteris Technologies.
