= LeMaitre Vascular =

Company in Burlington, United States

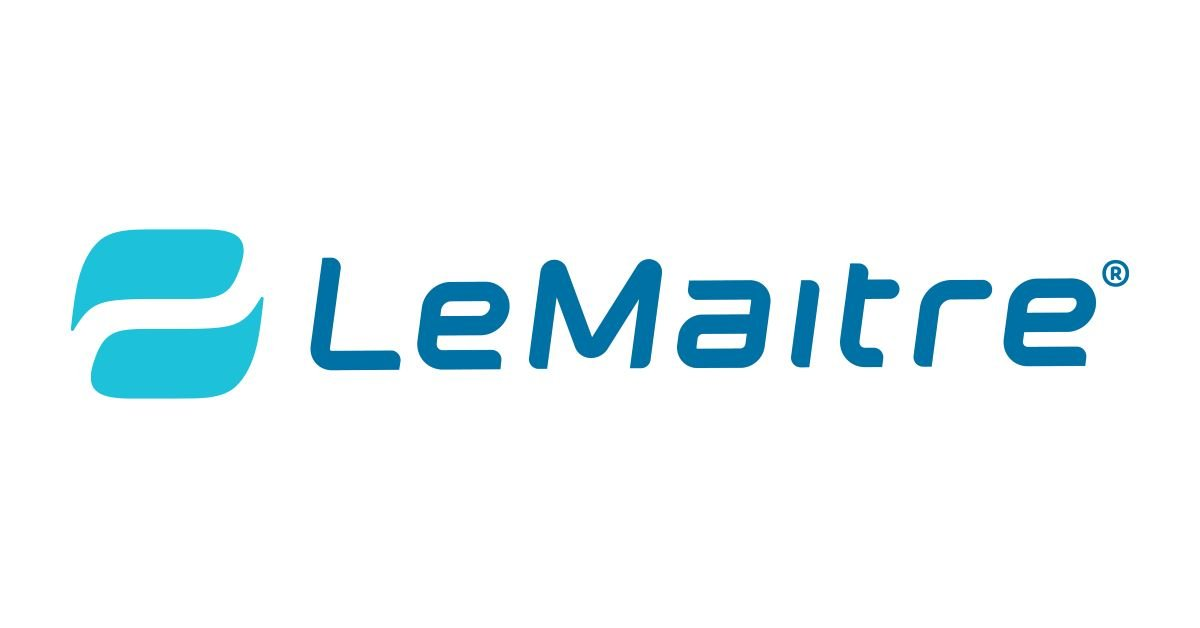
- Company type: Public
- Traded as: Nasdaq: LMAT; S&P 600 Component
- Industry: Medical device
- Founded: January 15, 1986; 40 years ago in Burlington, Massachusetts
- Founders: George D. LeMaitre
- Headquarters: Burlington, Massachusetts, U.S.
- Key people: George W. LeMaitre, Chairman and CEO; Dorian P. LeBlanc, CFO; David B. Roberts, President
- Operating income: ▲US$52.3.million (2024)
- Net income: ▲US$44.0 million (2024)
- Total assets: ▲US$551.82 million (2024)
- Total equity: ▲US$337.29 million (2024)
- Number of employees: 651 (2024)
- Website: www.lemaitre.com

LeMaitre Vascular is an American medical device company established in 1986 by vascular surgeon George D. LeMaitre, and based in Burlington, Massachusetts, which provides devices, implants and human tissue cryopreservation services used by surgeons in the treatment of vascular conditions, particularly peripheral vascular disease. As of 2022, LeMaitre Vascular sells directly to hospitals in 25 countries and through distributors in more than 70 countries throughout North America, Europe and Asia/Pacific Rim.

== History ==
=== Origin ===
The company's founder, George D. LeMaitre, M.D., was a practicing vascular surgeon in Massachusetts, chief of surgery at Lawrence General Hospital, and a clinical instructor at his alma mater, the Tufts University School of Medicine. In 1981, LeMaitre treated an elderly colleague who required a procedure to reroute blood flow in his leg in order to avoid a potential amputation. LeMaitre found it necessary to develop a valvulotome to enable the procedure. Unsatisfied with the options that were available to him, LeMaitre worked with an engineer to design a new device himself. His first patented valvulotome could be used by a surgeon to cut valves in peripheral veins without the requirement of direct vision. As a result, the surgeon could prepare veins for arterial bypass with smaller incisions and less tissue trauma.

LeMaitre succeeded in treating the patient with this invention, leading to further efforts to improve the technology between 1981 and 1984. LeMaitre was so pleased with the success of this new device that he spent the next two years attempting to interest medical product companies in producing it. When none agreed to do so, he mortgaged his house and started his own company in 1986 to introduce the LeMaitre Valvulotome to his colleagues. That same year, the invention was approved by the Food and Drug Administration.

=== Growth and development ===
Following LeMaitre's incorporation of the company, LeMaitre's son, George W. LeMaitre, joined the company and helped grow it from a family-owned company to a publicly held global corporation. In 1996, LeMaitre Vascular introduced the expandable LeMaitre valvulotome, which superseded the original circular-blade LeMaitre valvulotomes. After raising $3 million from investors in 1998, the senior LeMaitre decided to seek investments from other vascular surgeons. By 2004, when George D. LeMaitre stepped down as chair of the Board of Directors, the company had operations and facilities in Sulzbach, Germany, Phoenix, Arizona, St. Petersburg, Florida, Brymbo, Wales and beginning that year in Tokyo, Japan. Later in 2004, the company adopted a lean manufacturing approach to speed product production, and a 2005 profile described LeMaitre Vascular as a $30.5 million company with about 200 employees and "reporting explosive growth". By 2005, LeMaitre himself was noted as being "semiretired" from LeMaitre Vascular, and "focused on a second career in writing". In 2006, the company prepared an initial public offering of 6 million common shares, planned to be priced between $8 and $10 per share. In the late 2000s, LeMaitre had a distribution deal with California-based vascular products company Endologix, which the latter bought out in 2011. George D. LeMaitre died in 2018.

As of 2022, LeMaitre Vascular has continued to develop, manufacture and market disposable and implantable vascular devices for use in both open vascular surgeries and minimally invasive procedures. LeMaitre Vascular's product portfolio has continued to grow as a result of the company's research and subsequent development of new vascular devices, including its most recent generation of LeMaitre's original valvulotome. The company has also expanded through various acquisitions. LeMaitre acquired Applied Medical's vascular clot management business for $14.2 million in 2018, and the biologic patch business of Admedus for $15.5 million in October 2019. In mid-2020, the company acquired vascular graft-maker Artegraft for $90 million, anticipating that the newly acquired product lines would be a substantial proportion of LeMaitre's U.S. sales going forward.

== Products and acquisitions ==
=== Product lines ===
As of 2005, the company was noted to have obtained a quarter of its revenues from sales of valvulotomes, with other products including "embolectomy catheters, carotid shunts, and radiopaque tape". As of 2022, the company delineated its 13 product lines into six categories:

- Aortic
- AV access
- Cardiac
- Carotid
- Lower extremity
- Neuro

=== Acquisitions ===
Since its establishment, LeMaitre Vascular has also made acquisitions of product lines obtained by purchasing the line from other companies, or through purchasing another company in its entirety. These include:

LeMaitre Vascular acquisitions
Year	Acquisition	Key products and services
1998	Whittaker Screen Printing	Radiopaque tape manufacturing operations
1999	Vermed	Embolectomy catheters
2001	Ideas for Medicine	Carotid shunts, balloon catheters, and laparoscopic cholecystectomy devices
2003	Credent	Polycarbonate grafts
2004	VCS Clip	Vessel closure systems
2005	Endomed	Stent grafts
2007	Vascular Innovations	Contrast injector
2007	Vascular Architects	Remote endarterectomy devices
2007	UnBalloon	Stent graft modeling catheters
2007	Biomateriali	Polyester grafts and patches
2010	LifeSpan	ePTFE grafts
2012	XenoSure	Biologic patches
2013	Clinical Instruments	Carotid shunts and embolectomy catheters
2013	TRIVEX	Powered phlebectomy system
2014	Xenotis Pty Ltd	Biosynthetic grafts
2014	PeriVu	Angioscopes
2015	Tru-Incise (Eze-Sit) OUS	Valve cutters
2016	ProCol	Biologic grafts
2016	RestoreFlow	Human tissue cryopreservation services
2018	Syntel and Python	Embolectomy catheters
2018	Cardial	Polyester grafts, valvulotomes, surgical glue
2019	Tru-Incise (Eze-Sit) US	Valve cutters
2019	CardioCel and VascuCel	Biologic patches
2020	Artegraft	Vascular graft production

== Subsidiaries ==
Over the history of its growth, LeMaitre Vascular has established a number of domestic and foreign subsidiaries to carry out its business nationally and internationally.

LeMaitre Vascular U.S. subsidiaries
Subsidiary	Place of incorporation
LeMaitre UK Acquisition LLC	Delaware
LeMaitre Acquisition LLC	Delaware
Vascutech Acquisition LLC	Delaware

LeMaitre Vascular non-U.S. subsidiaries
Subsidiary	Place of incorporation
Biomateriali S.r.l.	Italy
LeMaitre Vascular GmbH	Germany
LeMaitre Vascular GK	Japan
LeMaitre Vascular SAS	France
LeMaitre Vascular Spain, S.L.	Spain
LeMaitre Vascular S.r.l.	Italy
