= George D. LeMaitre =

American physician

George LeMaitre
- Born: 6 December 1933; Lawrence, Massachusetts
- Died: 19 July 2018 (Age 84)
- Education: Boston College (B.A.); Tufts University School of Medicine (M.D.)
- Known for: How to Choose a Good Doctor; Valvulotome improvements
- Spouse: Cornelia Weldon LeMaitre
- Scientific career
- Fields: Medicine

George DeCesare LeMaitre (December 6, 1933 – July 19, 2018) was a Massachusetts-based vascular surgeon, author, and inventor. Of LeMaitre's five published books, his 1979 book, How to Choose a Good Doctor, received wide attention, and his inventions in the field of vascular surgery led to the development of a multinational company, LeMaitre Vascular. In 1981, he developed an improved valvulotome that allowed surgeons to cut valves in peripheral veins with smaller incisions and less tissue trauma.

== Early life, education, and career ==
Born in Lawrence, Massachusetts, LeMaitre graduated from Central Catholic High School in 1951, and received a B.A. in Mathematics from Boston College in 1955, followed by an M.D. from Tufts University School of Medicine in 1959. He received his surgical training at New England Medical Center, Hartford Hospital, and the Carney Hospital.

LeMaitre began practicing general and vascular surgery in 1964, and the following year, he published one of his earliest works, The patient in surgery: a guide for nurses, coauthored with Janet A. Finnegan. In 1966, LeMaitre joined the United States Army, serving until 1968.

== Public activities and writing ==
After leaving the military, George D. LeMaitre resumed his medical practice and became a clinical instructor at Tufts Medical School, while also becoming active in medical organizations and in addressing public concerns. In 1973, LeMaitre argued against the proposed dissolution of the Merrimack Valley Health Planning Council, stating that "[t]he ordinary citizen... should have a local health organization". By 1975, LeMaitre was head of the New England chapter of the incipient American Association of Councils of Medical Staffs. In that capacity, he expressed the willingness of doctors in the region to submit to a rate freeze proposed by Massachusetts Governor Michael Dukakis, noting that this was "a reaffirmation of a long-held tradition and obligation that patients are to be treated regardless of ability to pay". In 1978, LeMaitre became chief of surgery at Lawrence General Hospital.

In 1979, LeMaitre published How to Choose a Good Doctor, contending that while most doctors are good doctors, there are doctors who are bad, and patients should take care to avoid those who are inattentive, lack diligence, and tend towards unnecessary medical procedures. He espoused selecting a doctor with a board certification, but cautioned that neither an Ivy League education nor conspicuously displayed awards served as indicators of professionalism in practice. He also advised that hospitals tend to refer patients only to doctors on their own staff, and that patients should find a doctor who is young enough that they are not likely to retire soon. In addition to How to Choose a Good Doctor, LeMaitre "published numerous articles and books, including a surgical textbook". In a 1985 letter published in the Journal of the American Medical Association, LeMaitre lamented the transition he had observed of the practice of medicine into increasingly businesslike models.

== LeMaitre Vascular ==
In 1981, LeMaitre treated an elderly colleague who required a procedure to reroute blood flow in his leg in order to avoid a potential amputation. LeMaitre found it necessary to develop a valvulotome to enable the procedure. Unsatisfied with the options that were available to him, LeMaitre worked with an engineer to design a new device himself. His first patented valvulotome could be used by a surgeon to cut valves in peripheral veins without the requirement of direct vision. As a result, the surgeon could prepare veins for arterial bypass with smaller incisions and less tissue trauma.

LeMaitre succeeded in treating the patient with this invention, leading to further efforts to improve the technology between 1981 and 1984. LeMaitre was so pleased with the success of this new device that he spent the next two years attempting to interest medical product companies in producing it. When none agreed to do so, he mortgaged his house and started his own company, LeMaitre Vascular, in 1986, to introduce the LeMaitre Valvulotome to his colleagues. That same year, the invention was approved by the Food and Drug Administration. LeMaitre also served as president of the medical staff at Holy Family Hospital in Methuen, Massachusetts from 1988 to 1992. In the ensuing years, LeMaitre's son, George W. LeMaitre, joined the company and helped grow it from a family-owned company to a publicly held global corporation. A 2005 profile described LeMaitre Vascular as a $30.5 million company with about 200 employees and "reporting explosive growth".

== Personal life and death ==
LeMaitre married Cornelia Weldon of Andover, a fellow Boston College student, with whom he had three sons and two daughters.

LeMaitre retired from the practice of surgery in 1997, continuing as a clinical instructor at Tufts Medical School. By 2005, he was noted as being "semiretired" from LeMaitre Vascular, and "focused on a second career in writing". On July 19, 2018, he died at the Holy Family Hospital, at the age of 84.
