= Magister (application) =

Dutch school administration software

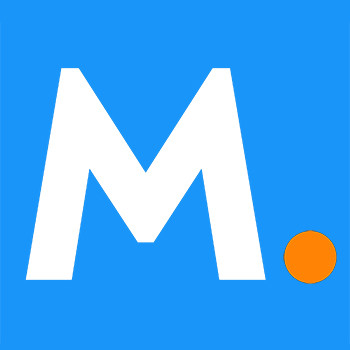
- Developer: Iddink
- Stable release: 6.4.15
- Operating system: Windows, Mac OS X, Linux (before August 2014), Symbian, iOS and Android
- Type: Web application, app
- License: Commercial
- Website: www.magister.nl

Magister is a Dutch online administrative application, used in the schooling system in secondary education. All of the students' information is on this platform. Students, parents and teachers are able to access this at all times. It is used to keep up with the management, administration and health issues of students, and users can also view their grades, timetable, homework assignments and absences. In 2012 the software had a 70% market share in the Netherlands.

Magister was put on the market as a SaaS (software as a service) by the company Schoolmaster, located in Leeuwarden. The company has been a part of the Iddink-groep since 2009.

== Access ==
There are different ways to access Magister.

=== Computer ===
To be able to access Magister, a modern browser that supports JavaScript is required.

=== Mobile phone ===
There is a mobile app for iOS and Android. On this app, students can see their grades and timetables, and message their teacher and other students.

== Magister 6 ==
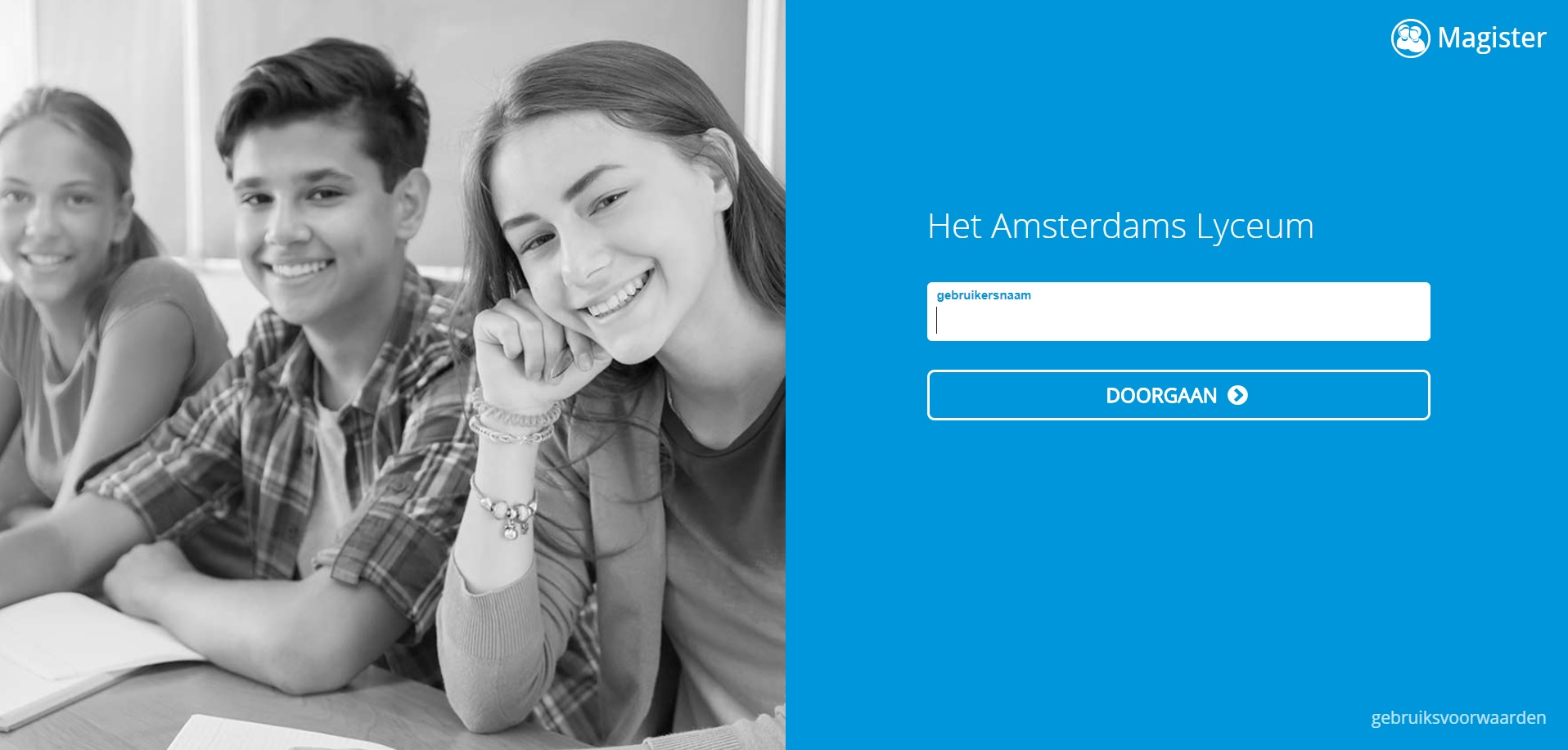
Magister 6 screenshot

Magister 6, the latest version of the program, was published in August 2014. It is available for students, teachers and parents.

After its launch, several groups tried integrating the technology in other ways. This was possible, because the new version offers support to REST-api, which made the process of storing information easier.

== Magister.me ==
Magister.me was a separate website made by Magister where teachers could insert documents and learning materials and allow students to access them. Teachers could also use Magister.me to grade students and log their grades. It was shut down on 31 July 2023, being replaced by Magister.learn.
