= Magister =

Magister is Latin for "master" or "teacher". It may refer to:

== Positions and titles ==
- Magister degree, an academic degree
- Magister novitium, Roman Catholic novice teacher
- Magister equitum, or Master of the Horse
- Magister militum, a master of the soldiers
- Magister officiorum (master of offices), a civilian post of the Roman Empire
- Magister palatii (Master of the Sacred Palace), a Roman Catholic curial position
- Magister, praefectus curiae, a house-master in medieval Europe

== Aircraft ==
- Fouga Magister, a French training aircraft
- Miles Magister, a British training aircraft

== Biology ==
- Neotoma magister, a species of pack rat
- Berryteuthis magister, a species of squid
- Metacarcinus magister, the Dungeness crab
- Sceloporus magister, a species of spiny lizard

== People ==
- Dositheus Magister, 4th-century Roman scholar
- Thomas Magister, 14th-century Byzantine monk and scholar
- Magister Wigbold, 14th-century German pirate

== Other ==
- Magister, a font designed by Aldo Novarese (1966)
- The Magister, a sourcebook for the Forgotten Realms setting of the Dungeons & Dragons RPG
- Magister (application), a Dutch school-administration application
- Master (software), originally Magister, the pseudonym of the Go software AlphaGo
