= Anne Lemaître =

Belgian applied mathematician

Anne Lemaître (born 1957) is a retired Belgian applied mathematician, formerly of the Université de Namur. She is an expert in orbital mechanics and orbital resonance, and their effects in the Solar System on bodies including asteroids, Mercury, and space debris.

== Education and career ==
Lemaître completed her Ph.D. in 1984 at the Université de Namur. Her dissertation concerned Kirkwood gaps, dips in asteroid density caused by orbital resonances with Jupiter; it was supervised by Jacques Henrard. She is a professor emerita in the mathematics department of the Université de Namur.

== Recognition ==
Minor planet 7330 Annelemaître is named in her honor, "for her pioneering analytic studies of the dynamics of minor planets in mean-motion resonances".

== Selected publications ==
- Henrard, J.; Lemaître, A. (1983), "A second fundamental model for resonance", Celestial Mechanics, 30 (2): 197–218, Bibcode:1983CeMec..30..197H, doi:10.1007/BF01234306, MR 0711658
- Lemaître, A. (1984), "High-order resonances in the restricted three-body problem", Celestial Mechanics, 32 (2): 109–126, Bibcode:1984CeMec..32..109L, doi:10.1007/BF01231119, MR 0740277
- Lemaitre, Anne; D'Hoedt, Sandrine; Rambaux, Nicolas (2006), "The 3:2 spin-orbit resonant motion of Mercury", Celestial Mechanics & Dynamical Astronomy, 95 (1–4): 213–224, Bibcode:2006CeMDA..95..213L, doi:10.1007/s10569-006-9032-y, MR 2268199
- Lemaître, A.; Delsate, N.; Valk, S. (2009), "A web of secondary resonances for large A/m geostationary debris", Celestial Mechanics & Dynamical Astronomy, 104 (4): 383–402, Bibcode:2009CeMDA.104..383L, doi:10.1007/s10569-009-9217-2, MR 2524815
