= Maestro Talent and Management =

Maestro Talent and Management Sdn Bhd was a Malaysian talent management, recording, and publishing company. It is wholly owned by Astro All Asia Networks, the dominant pay-TV provider in Malaysia. The company was closed down in Astro's restructuring exercise because of job losses on March 31, 2009.

== History ==
Maestro was established in July 2003 and operated from the former headquarters of Betarecs Sdn Bhd in Petaling Jaya. It started out as a three-man operation headed by music veteran and former performing arts academy Akademi Fantasia principal Freddie Fernandez, with the goal of managing, promoting and identifying aspiring talents.

In early 2009, the late 2000s recession, combined with Maestro's irrelevant conventional business module led to the closure of Maestro. However, the Maestro staff was not thrown in the lurch without compensation, and it was absorbed into the talent management division of Astro Entertainment Sdn Bhd, another of Astro All Asia Networks' subsidiary.
