= Maestro (service) =

American live-streaming service

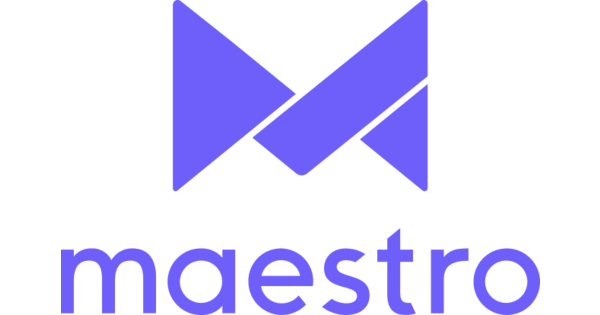
- Website type: Live streaming; Video on demand
- Founder: Ari Evans
- Key people: Ari Evans (CEO)
- Website: maestro.io
- Launched: 2015
- Current status: Active

Maestro is an American video live-streaming service founded in 2015 by Ari Evans. The service was popularized in 2020 following the COVID-19 pandemic, being used primarily by musicians to host online performances and concerts.

== History ==
Maestro was founded in 2015 by Ari Evans as a white-label and direct-to-consumer company. The platform shifted its focus to the music industry following the COVID-19 pandemic, allowing musicians to livestream performances during the lockdown. According to Evans, this shift tripled the company's revenue. In 2021, Sony Music Entertainment invested $15 million in the company, boosting the funding to $22 million as of then. The company has hosted livestreams for musicians including Billie Eilish, Tim McGraw, and Post Malone, and corporations such as Epic Games and ViacomCBS. Evans said Maestro aims to "become a one-stop shop for creators in the livestreaming space". Evans also described Maestro as "if Twitch and Squarespace had a baby".

== Features ==
Maestro allows artists to customize livestreams with interactive tools such as panels and overlays. Panels include static features like chat rooms, social media feeds, and virtual tip jars, while overlays are timed prompts used to encourage audience engagement, such as merchandise purchases or poll responses. The platform also supports direct integration of merchandise stores within livestreams, enabling viewers to buy products without leaving the stream.
