= Le Maistre =

Le Maistre (also Lemaistre, leMaistre) is a surname, and may refer to:

- Antoine Le Maistre (1608–1658), French Jansenist lawyer, author and translator
- Catherine Lemaistre (1590–1651), French religious figure
- Charles LeMaistre (1925–2017), U.S. medical doctor
- Janice leMaistre, Canadian judge
- Jean Le Maistre, Vice-Inquisitor for Rouen, at the Trial of Joan of Arc
- Louis-Isaac Lemaistre de Sacy (1613–1684), French priest
- Malcolm Le Maistre (born 1949), English musician, experimental artist and theatre director
- Mattheus Le Maistre (c.1505–1577), Flemish choirmaster and composer
- Stephen Caesar Le Maistre (died 1777), British judge in India

== See also ==
- Le Maitre (surname)
- De Maistre (surname)
- Maistre (surname)
