= Jade Le Maître =

French engineer

Jade Le Maître is technical director and co-founder of Hease Robotics, a robotic startup which was liquidated by court order on the 7th of November 2019. She also co-launched Lyon-Is-AI and co-founded the Social Robots Community. She grew up in Châteaufort (France).

== Education ==
Le Maître is a graduate engineer. She graduated from the EPF School of Engineering in Sceaux and the Munich University of Applied Sciences.

== Career ==
Le Maître worked in the Communications directorate at the University Pierre and Marie Curie, then joined Innorobo where she worked for two years. In 2016, she co-founded Hease Robotics, a start-up based in Lyon. She is an expert advisor to the European Commission. She figured in the Forbes' "Europe's Top 50 Women In Tech" and "The World's Top 50 Women In Tech" lists of 2018.

== Awards ==
Le Maître was Silver national laureate in the category "Promising Woman Business Executive" for the prize "Les Femmes de l'économie" in 2017.
