= Architecture of Cesar Department =

Colombian architecture

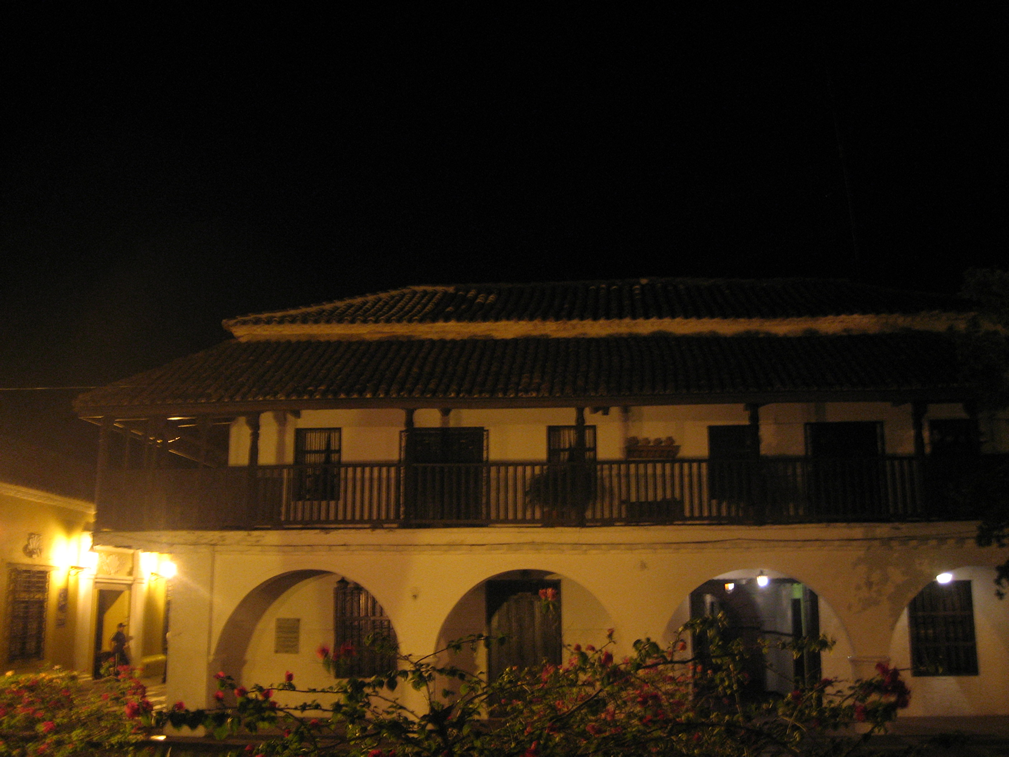
The Mastre-Pavajeau house, built (1802), Valledupar.

The Architecture of Cesar Department refers to the architecture in the Cesar Department of Colombia, which still preserves much of the colonial architecture inherited by the Spanish colonization and the architecture developed by the numerous tribes of indigenous peoples of the Cesar Department that included the Tairona, Chimila, Motilon and Kalina.

== Indigenous architecture ==
Before the arrival of the Spanish the indigenous settlements constructions varied in architectural techniques. Most of the base of the houses were constructed with stones glued together with clay on a flattened terrain, the walls were made using a bareke mix, miking clay, intricate sticks and hay to create solid walls. The roof had a frame of solid sticks forming a cone and covered tightly in grass or palm branches. Indigenous like the Arhuacos had developed villages in the Sierra Nevada de Santa Marta mountain range which interconnected their houses through a system of stone roads and steps. This type of architecture is still practiced in certain indigenous tribes settlements.

== Spanish architecture ==
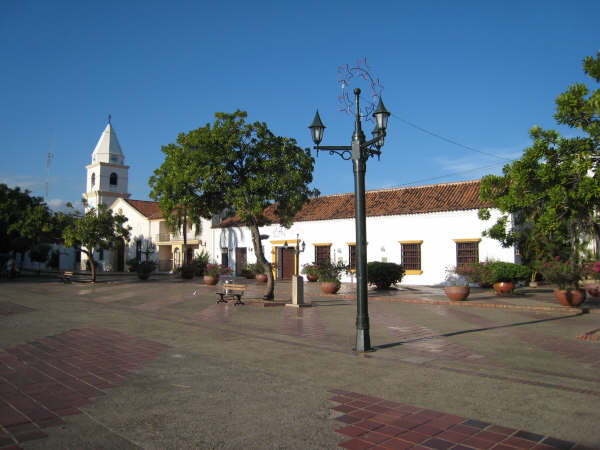
The Molina-Cespedes house and La Concepción church in the Alfonso Lopez main plaza, Valledupar.

Upon the arrival of the Spanish in the region during the early 16th Century, their construction techniques were used for their new settlements which were isolated haciendas in the middle of a large extension of land. Villages had very few houses and were usually built by a church and a commons plaza which was used for the pasture of the horses and cattle. The first houses were constructed using oven made clay bricks, wooden pillars and clay tiles. Houses usually had a single or two floors, squared with a garden in the middle, surrounded by numerous rooms. The doors, windows and balconies were made of wood with metal hinges and nails. Some street roads were covered with stones.

This type of architecture is still used in certain isolated villages in the Cesar Department.

== Colombian architecture ==
Based on standards set by the Colombian government on architectural techniques standards the development in construction began in the 20th Century with the use of cement, river sand and iron based on advancement of the Industrial Revolution.

== See also ==
- Architecture of Colombia
