= List of Karakuri Circus characters =

The three main characters from the series (from left to right): Masaru Saiga, Éléonore "Shirogane" Saiga, and Narumi Katō

The Japanese manga series Karakuri Circus features an extensive cast of characters created by Kazuhiro Fujita.

== Main characters ==
Masaru Saiga (才賀 勝, Saiga Masaru)
Voiced by: Chihiro Ueda
Masaru is the illegitimate son of the Saiga Corporation CEO. His father bequeaths him 18 billion yen as part of a scheme to provoke the Kuroga clan—former clients who commissioned puppet designs from the Saiga family. Now targeted by his paternal relatives, Masaru faces repeated assassination attempts as they deploy puppet-wielding mercenaries to eliminate him and claim his inheritance.
Narumi Katō (加藤 鳴海, Katō Narumi)
Voiced by: Rikiya Koyama
Narumi is a martial artist specializing in Xing Yi Quan who suffers from Zonapha syndrome, a condition that impairs his breathing and can only be alleviated by making others laugh. Despite his lack of comedic talent, he becomes Masaru's protector after rescuing the boy during a street attack.
Shirogane Saiga (才賀 しろがね, Saiga Shirogane)
Voiced by: Megumi Hayashibara
Shirogane, born Éléonore (エレオノール, Ereonōru), is the daughter of Shōji and Angelina Saiga. Raised as an orphan in Quiberon, France, she receives rigorous training in puppet manipulation. Traveling to Japan to honor a debt to Masaru's grandfather, she becomes the boy's protector and caretaker. She operates Harlequin, one of the most formidable puppets, as part of her guardianship duties.

== Saiga Family ==
Shōji Saiga (才賀 正二, Saiga Shōji)
Voiced by: Masahiko Tanaka
Masaru's grandfather and master puppeteer who married Angelina with whom he had their daughter Éléonore.
Sadayoshi Saiga (才賀 貞義, Saiga Sadayoshi)
Voiced by: Toshio Furukawa
Sadayoshi Saiga, born Dean Maistre, is the reincarnation of Bai Yang and CEO of the Saiga Corporation. Adopted by Shōji Saiga, he plots to transfer his consciousness into his illegitimate son Masaru to achieve immortality. Upon his death, he bequeaths his fortune to Masaru while using the inheritance as bait to destroy the Kuroga clan.
Zenji Saiga (才賀 善治, Saiga Zenji)
Voiced by: Akio Otsuka
One of Masaru's uncles who kidnaps the boy and tries to adopt him in an effort to inherit his brother's fortune.
Angelina Saiga (才賀 アンジェリーナ, Saiga Anjerīna)
Voiced by: Megumi Hayashibara
Daughter of Lucille and one of the first Shirogane who held the Soft Stone within her body. She married Shōji Saiga and gave birth to their daughter Éléonore to whom she transferred the Soft Stone.
Éléonore Saiga (才賀 エレオノール, Saiga Ereonōru)
Voiced by: Megumi Hayashibara
Daughter of Shōji and Angelina Saiga who inherited the Soft Stone from her mother Angelina.

== Nakamachi Circus ==
Shinobu Nakamachi (仲町 信夫, Nakamachi Shinobu)
Voiced by: Hisao Egawa
Head of the Nakamachi Circus and husband of Fusae who died during a circus performance.
Noriyuki "Nori" Nakamachi (仲町 紀之, Nakamachi Noriyuki)
Voiced by: Ryota Iwasaki
The older son of Shinobu Nakamachi and reliable big-brother figure to Hiro.
Hiroo "Hiro" Nakamachi (仲町 浩男, Nakamachi Hiroo)
Voiced by: Kaito Ishikawa
The younger son of Shinobu Nakamachi.
Talanda "Lise" Liselotte Tachibana (タランダ・リーゼロッテ・橘, Taranda Rīzerotte Tachibana)
Voiced by: Tomoyo Kurosawa
A young girl working in Nakamachi Circus as the animal handler and beast tamer of the lion called Drum. Her family were wild beast tamers in the Great Long Circus until her sister was killed by a tiger named Beast.
Vilma Thorne (ヴィルマ・ソーン, Vuiruma Sōn)
Voiced by: Marina Inoue
She is a master knife-thrower and assassin hired to kill Masaru, but instead joins the Nakamachi Circus. Her brother died from Zonapha syndrome and she harbors a strong hatred for automated puppets due to a past incident.
Morobi Mitsu'ushi
He is the ringmaster of the Straw Circus, the circus Narumi and Shirogane were working for at the beginning of the series. He is vain, refusing to help the Nakamachis at first and trying to win over Shirogane to come back to the Straw Circus. After the Straw Circus goes bankrupt from he and his son Naota's embezzlement of funds, he ends up joining the Nakamachi Circus.
Naota Mitsu'ushi
He is a member of the Straw Circus who harbors romantic feelings for Shirogane. Along with his father, he joins the Nakamachi Circus after the Straw Circus goes bankrupt.

== Midnight Circus ==
A circus of Automatons led by the four master Automatons known as Les Quatre Pionniers (The Four Pioneers) that travel while spreading Zonapha syndrome in hopes of one day fulfilling their late master/makers final wish "to make Francine smile/laugh".

Doll Francine (フランシーヌ人形, Furanshīnu Ningyō)
Voiced by: Megumi Hayashibara
Doll Francine is the Automaton ruler of the Midnight Circus, created as her master's companion. Unable to smile, she inspired his creation of four elite jester Automatons designed to amuse her. After his death, she assumed control, mass-producing Automatons to fulfill his wish. She spreads Zonapha syndrome in this pursuit and seeks the Soft Stone, a component of life-giving aqua vitae, to achieve true sentience.
Arlecchino (アルレッキーノ, Arurekkīno)
Voiced by: Jun Fukuyama
One of the four master Automatons, he is the musician of the circus. His clothes are all white and his instrument is a mandolin. He is thoughtful and seems quite proud. His attacks involves the manipulation of fire.
Pantalone (パンタローネ, Pantarōne)
Voiced by: Jouji Nakata
One of the four master Automatons, he is the ball walker of the circus. He is quick to anger and is the most irresponsible of the four. His main form of attack is using his arms which possess a very high level of strength making him the physically strongest of the circus.
Dottore (ドットーレ, Dottōre)
Voiced by: Ryūzaburō Ōtomo
Dottore is one of the four master Automatons of the Midnight Circus, serving as its juggler. Driven by curiosity about human experiences, he seeks to understand the meaning of the word "delicious." His mechanical body features extendable arms, and he employs his hat—whose brim functions as a razor-sharp blade—as both a performance prop and weapon.
Columbine (コロンビーヌ, Koronbīnu)
Voiced by: Aoi Yūki
The only woman among the four master Automatons, she is the acrobat/rope walker of the circus and can jump very high. She wants to live a love story like the ones she's read in books, the only flaw is that she cannot feel the sensation of the skin of another person. Her weapons are Les Mains Blanches Immaculeés (Immaculate White Hands).

== Shirogane-O ==
George LaRoche (ジョージ・ラローシュ, Jōji Rarōshu)
Voiced by: Kenji Hamada
Faceless (フェイスレス, Feisuresu)
Voiced by: Toshio Furukawa
The commander of Shirogane forces. He has the ability to stretch his face inhumanly and often approaches matters with a facetious tone. He claims to have lost his lover to an Automaton. He created the Shirogane-O, a subset of Shirogane with mechanical bodies. It is eventually revealed that he was originally Bai Jin, the creator of the automata, and had gone through multiple identities over the years with his most recent one being Sadayoshi Saiga.
Naya Steele (ナイア・スティール, Naia Sutīru)
Voiced by: Sayaka Kinoshita
A female Shirogane-O working under Faceless. She serves as the General Leader of the US Division of the Shirogane-O. She is the first to die during the assault on the Midnight Circus but later appears in a new body.
Ma Lina (馬 麗娜, Mā Riina)
Voiced by: Kayo Ishida
A young female Shirogane-O who is involved in the fight against Les Quatre Pionniers. Her arms and legs can become high-speed drills to attack an adversary.

== Other characters ==
Lucille Berneuil (ルシール・ベルヌイユ, Rushīru Berunuiyu)
Voiced by: Romi Park
Lucille is a nearly 200-year-old survivor of Quiberon village, having prolonged her life by consuming Bai Yin's Aqua Vitae. She collaborates with Guy Christoph Resh and assists Narumi Katō in tracking the Midnight Circus. To preserve the Aqua Vitae-producing Soft Stone as protection against automata, she concealed it within her daughter Angelina, preventing its natural dissolution after two weeks.
Eiryō Ashihana (阿紫花 英良, Ashihana Eiryō)
Voiced by: Takahiro Sakurai
He is a member of the Slaughter Team, hired to kill Masaru and controls the puppet Pulcinella.
Guy Christoph Resh (ギイ・クリストフ・レッシュ, Gī Kurisutofu Resshu)
Voiced by: Nozomu Sasaki
He works at the hospital run by Dr. Banhart which is a research facility and orphanage for children suffering from Zonapha syndrome. He uses the last amount of Aqua Vitae to save Narumi after he is fatally wounded and loses his arm.
Liang Jian-Feng (梁剣峰(リャン・チャンフォン), Hari Kenpō (Ryan Chanfon))
Voiced by: Katsuhisa Houki
He is the Chinese master who taught Narumi martial arts and contracted Zonapha syndrome. His ancestor created Aqua Vitae 200 years earlier.
Liang Ming-Xia (梁明霞(リャン・ミンシア), Ryō Meika (Ryan Minshia))
Voiced by: Yoshino Nanjō
Daughter of Liang Jian-Feng and helps Narumi search for the Midnight Circus.
Fatima (ファティマ)
Voiced by: Ayane Sakura
A young female Shirogane who has jurisdiction of an area in the central Sahara Desert. She acts as the leader of the ground assault on the Midnight Circus.
Timbavati (ティンババティ, Timbatty)
Voiced by: Takahiro Fujiwara
An African male Shirogane who is involved in the fight against Les Quatre Pionniers. His marionette is called Mamba and it uses its Tower of Venomous Fangs to attack an adversary.
Steve Rockenfield (スティーブ・ロッケンフィールド, Sutību Rokkenfīrudo)
Voiced by: Hiromichi Kogami
A middle-aged male Shirogane who is involved in the fight against Les Quatre Pionniers. His marionette is called Pentagona Knocker.
Schwarzes Tor (シュヴァルツェス・トーア, Schwarzse Toa)
Voiced by: Daisuke Egawa
A male Shirogane with long white hair who is involved in the fight against Les Quatre Pionniers. His marionette is also called Schwarzes Tor.

== Historic characters ==
Bai Yin (白銀)
Voiced by: Tomokazu Seki
Bai Yin (Liang Jian-Feng's ancestor) is a Prague-trained alchemist from 200 years ago who physically resembles Narumi. He proposes to Francine, vowing to abandon alchemy to help the poor. His creation, the ruby Soft Stone, produces Aqua Vitae when combined with water and a human soul. While traveling, he mentors Shōji Saiga in medicine, alchemy, and puppetry. He ultimately dissolves his essence into Aqua Vitae to cure Zonapha syndrome, founding the Shirogane line (derived from his Japanese name).
Bai Jin (白金)
Voiced by: Toshio Furukawa
Bai Yin's younger brother and creator of Aqua Vitae. After Francine chooses Yin, Yang creates an artificial Francine and the Midnight Circus automatons: Pantalone, Arlecchino, Dottore, and Columbina. He infects a village with Zonapha syndrome to make his automaton laugh. Before dying, Yang transfers his consciousness into a Bai youth using Aqua Vitae, becoming Dean Maistre. Later adopted by Shōji Saiga as Sadayoshi, he eventually assumes the identity of Commander Faceless.
Francine (フランシーヌ, Furanshīnu)
Voiced by: Megumi Hayashibara
Francine is a young woman bearing a striking resemblance to Shirogane Saiga. After escaping French slave traders, she survives as a street vendor in Prague, often sharing her meager earnings with orphans. When branded a thief for stealing an egg to feed a sick child, she befriends the alchemist brothers Bai Yin and Bai Yang. She accepts Yin's marriage proposal, provoking Yang's jealousy. He abducts her, and she perishes nine years later when the village imprisoning her burns down.
