= Valvulotome =

A valvulotome is a catheter-based controllable surgical instrument used for cutting or disabling the venous valves. This is needed to enable an in situ bypass in patients with an occluded artery (especially femoral artery), where the saphenous vein is disconnected from the venous system and connected to arteries above and below the occluded segment to allow blood to flow to the lower leg.

Since the leg veins usually contain a number of valves that direct flow towards the heart, they cannot directly be used as graft, but if vein valves are removed the arterial blood can flow via the GSV to the lower leg - this is called an in situ graft procedure, a type of vascular bypass.

The valvulotome itself is a long, flexible catheter with a recessed cutting blade at its end for the destruction of venous valves. The valvulotome is inserted at the distal end of the vein, guided to the proximal end, then withdrawn. It is during withdrawal that the valves are destroyed. The blade is designed to prevent exposure of the vein intima to the sharp cutting surface to avoid damage to the vessel wall. It is often designed resembling a hook, with a blunt outer surface and a sharp inner surface that makes contact with the venous valve as the device is withdrawn, but not during insertion.
