= Baronne Almaury de Maistre =

French composer

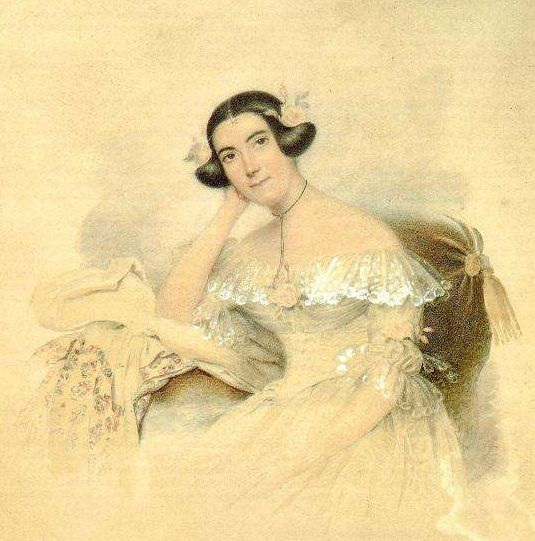
- 1838 watercolor

Baronne Almaury de Maistre (English: Baroness Almaury de Maistre) née Henriette-Marie de Sainte-Marie (31 July 1809, Nevers – 7 June 1875, Chaulgnes) was a French composer. In 1831 she married Baron Charles-Augustin Almaury de Maistre. She maintained a popular salon during the winter months. She composed etudes and an opera, Les Roussalkas, which was created in Brussels at the Théâtre de la Monnaie on March 14, 1870 and also presented at Antwerp on March 18, 1871.
