= Maitre =

Maitre or Maître is a French-language title, associated with lawyers. It is also a surname, equivalent to the English "Master"

Notable people with the surname include:

- Jean-Philippe Maitre (1949–2006), Swiss politician
- Romain Maitre (born 1988), French motorcycle racer

== Other uses ==
- Wolfgang Niedecken, German rock musician whose nickname is Maître

== See also ==
- Maistre (surname)
- Le Maitre (surname)
