= John A. Gauci-Maistre =

Maltese businessman (born 1947)

John A. Gauci-Maistre K.M.
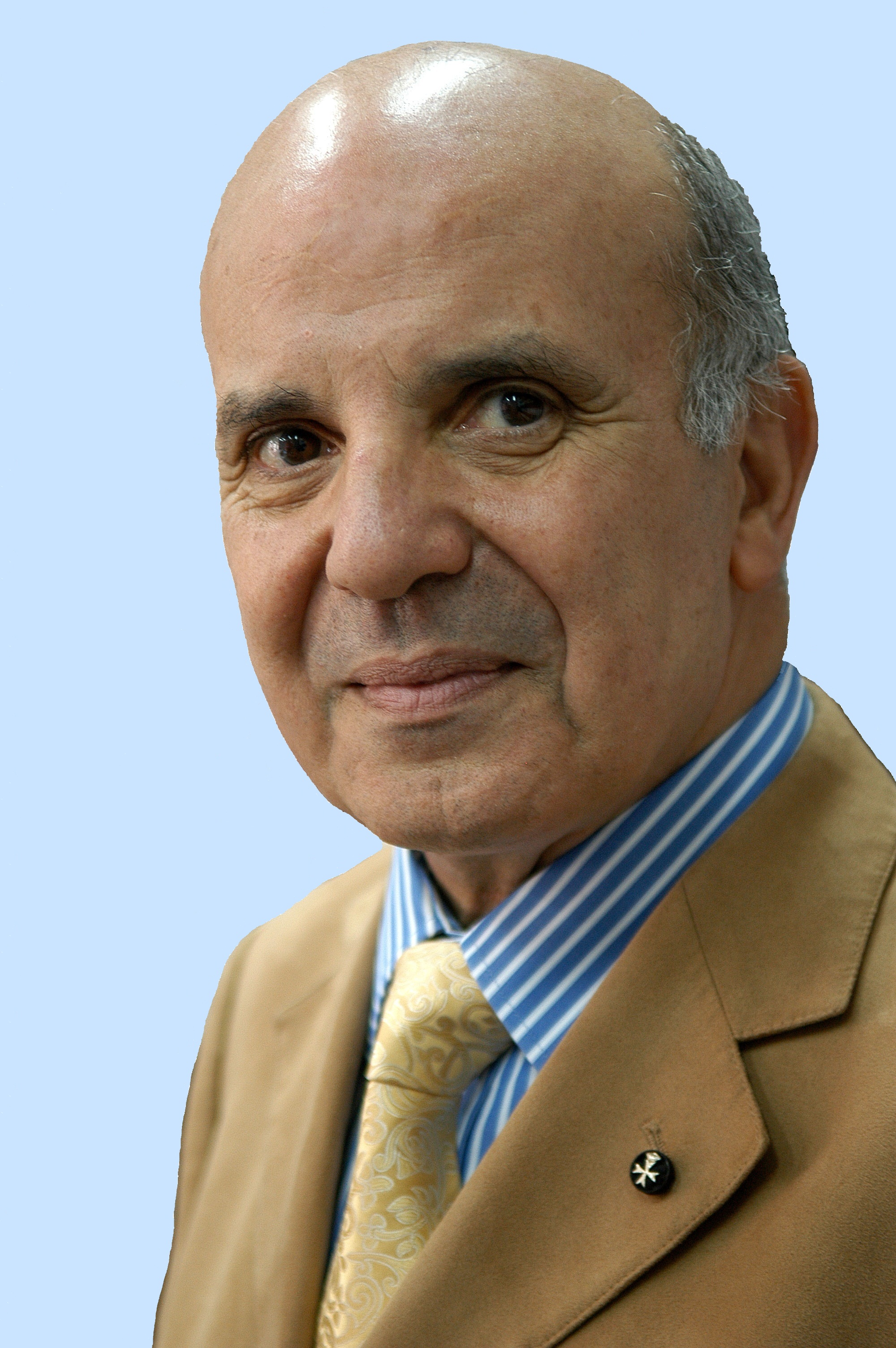
- Born: 1947 (age 78–79); Sliema, Malta
- Occupation: Businessman
- Children: 4
- Parent(s): Judge Agostino Gauci-Maistre; Winifred Mifsud

John A. Gauci-Maistre (born 1947) is a Maltese businessman associated with maritime services, corporate and fiduciary services, and conference organisation in Malta. He is the founder and chairman of the Economicard Group of Companies.

== Early life and career ==
Gauci-Maistre was born in Sliema, Malta, in 1947, the son of Judge Agostino Gauci-Maistre and Winifred Mifsud. He attended St. Aloysius’ College in Malta and later worked in the United Kingdom, where he gained experience in management and accounting while employed with Southwell & Tyrrel. After returning to Malta, he became involved in the management of the Penta Hotel in Paceville.

Gauci-Maistre has contributed commentary to maritime-related publications, including Lloyd’s List and Fairplay.

== Economicard Group of Companies ==
The Economicard Group of Companies is a group of Malta-based entities operating in maritime services, corporate and fiduciary services, legal services, and conference organisation. Companies within the group include GM International Services Limited, Economicard Worldwide Limited, GM Corporate & Fiduciary Services Limited, GM International Conferences & Exhibitions, GM & Associates – Advocates, and GM For You.

== Economicard Worldwide Limited ==
In 1973, Gauci-Maistre founded Economicard Worldwide Limited, which introduced a cash discount card system in Malta. The company later expanded into travel-related services and was appointed General Sales Agent for Olympic Airways in Malta from 1981 until 2009.

=== Computing distribution ===
During the late 1970s and 1980s, Economicard Worldwide Limited acted as a distributor for Commodore computers in Malta, including the Commodore 64 and later the Amiga. The company also offered computer training courses to the public during this period.

== GM International Services Limited ==
Following the enactment of the Merchant Shipping Act in 1973, which established the Malta Ship Register, Gauci-Maistre founded GM International Services Limited in 1974. The company provides ship and yacht registration services under the Malta flag.

Industry publications have described Gauci-Maistre as an early contributor to the development of the Malta Ship Register during its formative years.

== GM Corporate & Fiduciary Services ==
In 1988, Gauci-Maistre established GM Nominee, which later evolved into GM Corporate & Fiduciary Services Limited following legislative changes to Malta’s financial services framework. The firm provides corporate administration, fiduciary, and related professional services to international clients.

== Conferences and exhibitions ==
Through GM International Conferences & Exhibitions Limited, Gauci-Maistre has been involved in the organisation of conferences and exhibitions in Malta. In 2018, he was involved in organising the Malta Maritime Summit, which focused on maritime policy, logistics, sustainability, and related topics.

== Other roles ==
Gauci-Maistre has served on the boards of the Malta Chamber of Commerce, Enterprise and Industry and the Malta Trade Fairs Corporation. He also served as President of the Maltese–Italian Chamber of Commerce and as President of the Casino Maltese between 2009 and 2011.

== Recognition ==
In 2022, Gauci-Maistre received a lifetime achievement award recognising his contribution to the maritime industry and the development of ship registration under the Malta flag.

== Honours ==
In 2000, Gauci-Maistre was appointed a knight of the Sovereign Military Order of Malta.

== Personal life ==
Gauci-Maistre is married to Ann Marie Pace and has four children. One of his children, Sarah Engerer, is a barrister practising in Malta and has held senior legal roles within the family’s business interests; she has also serves as Honorary Consul of Uruguay in Malta.
