= Northwind (company) =

Software company in Canada

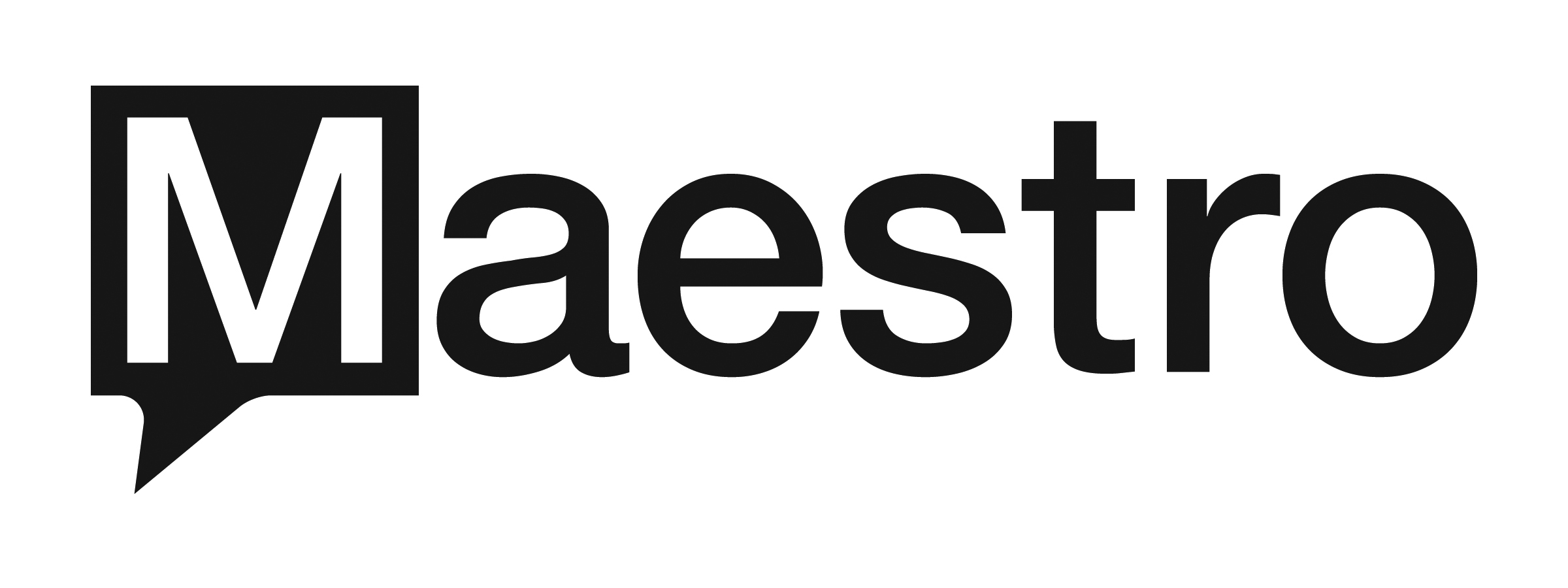

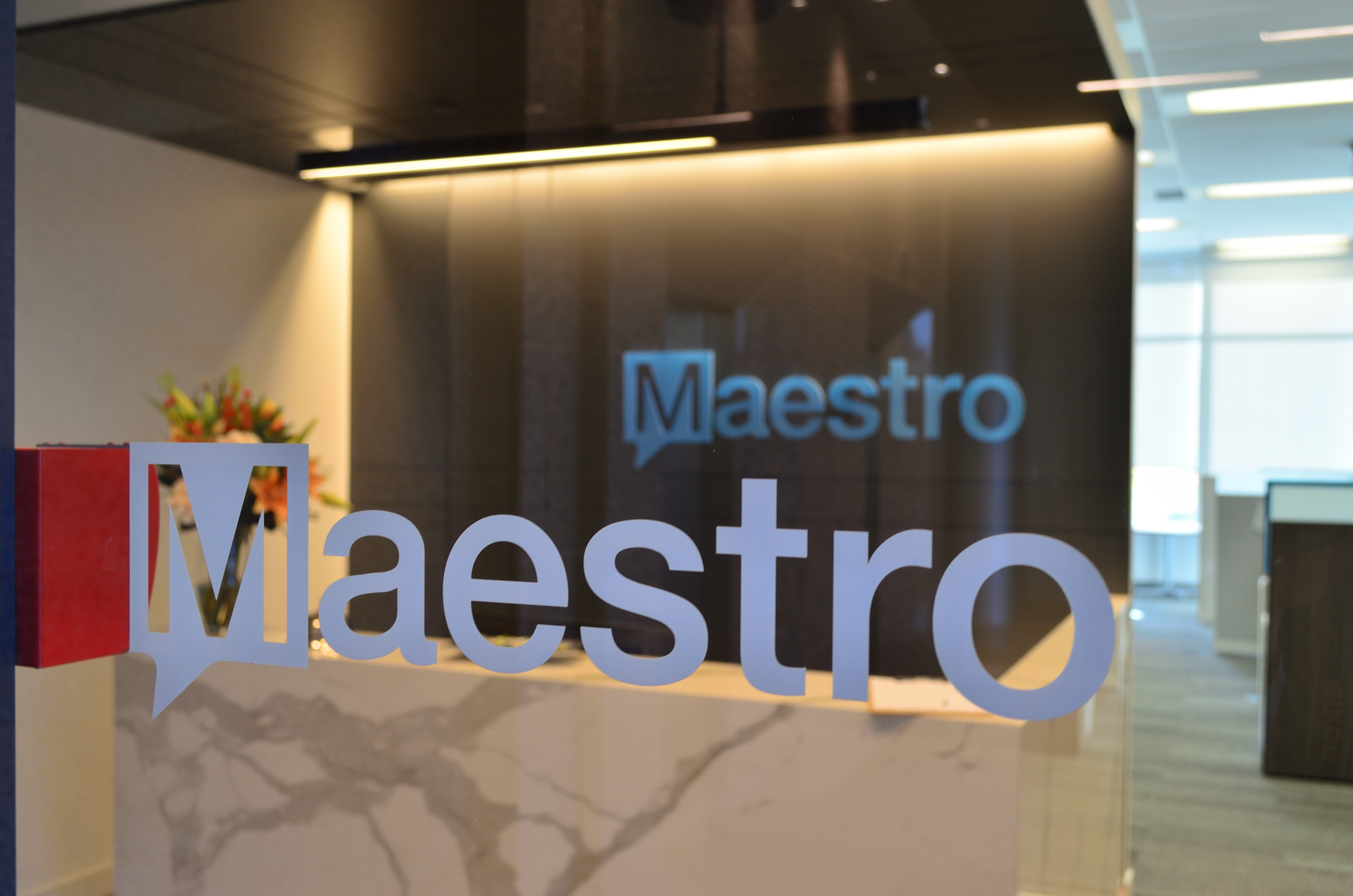
- Northwind office in Markham
- Company type: Private
- Industry: Software Development
- Founded: Toronto, Ontario, Canada, 1978
- Headquarters: Markham, Ontario, Canada
- Key people: Warren Dehan, Audrey MacRae

Northwind is a privately held company that develops property management systems, as well as GDS/web based booking products for the hospitality industry. Maestro Enterprise Suite, the company's flagship product, includes a variety of modules which can be co-ordinated to comply with a hotel or hotel chain's requirements. Maestro is a multi-platform system with over 10,000 users. It allows optimized adaptability to single or multi-property businesses. Northwind's headquarters are in Markham, Ontario, with sales and support offices located worldwide.

== History ==
- 1978 – Company formed to respond to the need for custom software development
- 1979 – Custom development of back office accounting, travel agency commission payables, and guest history management for a major Canadian hotel chain
- 1980 – Ongoing development of various custom software modules in a mini computer environment
- 1982 – Begin development of UNIX based hotel property management system (PMS)
- 1983 – Development of Telephone Answering Services Management software
- 1984 – Computerized Hospitality Solutions (CHS) Front Office successfully introduced to the market
- 1986 – Decision to focus strictly on hospitality and retire non-hotel software
- 1989 – U.S. sales office established in Florida.
- 1992 – Begin development of UNIX and Windows version of new client/server PMS “CHS2000”
- 1994 – CHS2000 Version 1 successfully introduced to the market
- 1994 – First installation of CHS2000 Windows PMS
- 1997 – Yield management functionality implemented as an integrated component of CHS2000
- 1999 – CHS legacy software retired, existing clients offered free upgrade to Maestro
- 1999 – CHS2000 redesigned and deployed as Maestro PMS
- 2000 – Spa & Activities Management module developed for resort operations
- 2001 – Shuttle Services Management module developed
- 2002 – Extended Stay Management enhancements added to PMS
- 2002 – Maestro Enterprise Multi-Property deployed
- 2003 – Enhanced service initiative (Diamond Plus) deployed to all Maestro users
- 2003 – Development of condominium owner accounting module
- 2003 – ResEze real-time fully integrated Web Booking Engine introduced
- 2004 – Added ASP Citrix & Terminal Services based support
- 2005 – Enhanced security features including credit card masking and database encryption added for PCI compliance
- 2006 – Enhanced Spa & Activities Management, Retail POS, and interfaces including 2-way GDS/OTA, 2-way Yield management
- 2006 – Added Fine Dining POS, Club Membership and Golf Scheduling Modules
- 2007 – Integrated Member Management system introduced
- 2007 – Table Reservations with On-line functionality introduced
- 2008 – ResWave Booking Engine extends functionality of online presence for clients
- 2008 – Maestro Users Group is formed to promote client collaboration
- 2008 – Diamond Plus Service expanded to include free On-Demand Live Training and Beginners Education program, Web Connection initiative of online features & functions deployed
- 2010 – Launches Maestro Self-Service Touch Screen Kiosk, fully tokenized interface for payment card processing & Maestro PMS Certified for PCI Compliancy, PA-DSS Standards
- 2011 – Integrated online property based member Loyalty Program, handheld checkin/checkout support
- 2012 – Online loyalty program integration
- 2013 – Introduction of self serve eLearning website for Maestro PMS users
- 2014 – Introduction of Maestro Web, a browser based, feature equivalent version of Maestro PMS
- 2014 – EMV credit card support added (Chip and Pin) for secure credit card payments
- 2015 – Mobile tools added including housekeeping, online check in, and tablet based folio display
- 2016 – Post Checkin Surveys, Mobile Checkout, Online Payment Portal
- 2017 – Northwind acquires assets of Navicom Inc. to provide reputation management for its clients

== Products & services ==
=== Maestro Enterprise Suite ===
The Maestro Enterprise Suite is a sophisticated property management system used by single and multi-property hotel groups to share information between all branches of an operation, allowing for total network control. The Maestro Enterprise Suite has the following modules:

- Maestro Property Management Suite
- Maestro Sales & Catering Suite
- Maestro Multi-Property Suite
- Maestro Corporate Enterprise Suite

=== ResWave ===
ResWave is Northwind's real-time, on-line web booking suite, allowing package customization of guest services such as room, spa, dining & event reservations, and group management.

=== Diamond Plus ===
Diamond Plus is a support service initiative provided by Northwind to its clients. The service includes access to a 24/7 support center, remote training facilities for clients, software customization, and access to self-serve web training and documentation.

== Executives ==
- Warren Dehan – President
- Audrey MacRae – Vice President
