= Meister =

German term that means master craftsman

Meister (pronounced [ˈmaɪstɐ]) means 'master' in German (as in master craftsman, or as an honorific title such as Meister Eckhart). The word is akin to master and maestro. In sports, Meister is used for the current national, European or world champion (e.g. Deutscher Meister, Europameister, Weltmeister).

== Etymology ==
Meister is derived from the Greek word "μήστωρ" (adviser, counselor, adept, scientist), the Latin word "magister" (teacher), the German "meister" from Old High German "meistar".

Meister has been borrowed into English slang, where it is used in compound nouns. A person referred to as “Meister” is one who has extensive theoretical knowledge and practical skills in his profession, business, or some other kind of work or activity. For example, a “puzzle-meister” would be someone highly skilled at solving puzzles. These neologisms sometimes have a sarcastic intent (for example, “stubble-meister” for someone with a short, neat beard, or “crier-meister” for someone who often cries).

== Professional degree ==
In Germany and Austria, the word Meister also assigns a title and public degree in the field of vocational education. The German Meister title qualifies the holder to study at a University or Fachhochschule, whether the Meister holds the regular entry qualification (Abitur or Fachhochschulreife) or not.[1] In 2012, the commissions of the states and the federal government, as well as the associated partners, concluded that the Meisterbrief is equivalent to a bachelor's degree (Deutscher Qualifikationsrahmen für lebenslanges Lernen and European qualification framework EQF, Level 6, Niveau 6). In the year 2020 plans were finalised to rename the meister title to "professional bachelor"

The Master craftsman is the highest professional qualification in crafts and is a state-approved grade. The education includes theoretical and practical training in the craft and also business and legal training, and includes the qualification to be allowed to train apprentices as well. The status of Master craftsman is regulated in the German Gesetz zur Ordnung des Handwerks, HwO (Crafts and Trades Regulation Code).

To become a master craftsman usually requires vocational training in the specific crafts in which the examination should be taken (a successfully completed apprenticeship and examination, called Gesellenprüfung). In addition to attaining the journeyman (Geselle) degree, until 2004 the Crafts and Trades Regulation Code did furthermore require practical experience of 3 years as a journeyman. In the German field of Meister education, specialised training courses for the Meisterprüfung ("Meister examination") can be followed. The duration of the courses can take 1 to 2 years. The examination includes theoretical, practical and oral parts and takes 5 to 7 days (depending on the craft). In some crafts, the creation of a masterpiece is also part of the examination.

In professional life, Meister usually refers to a higher degree in vocational education.

== Police ==
The shoulder boards of the Meister (Ordnungspolizei, as well as the West German police until the 1980s). Before 1945, the background stripes were dark brown for the regular police units, and ginger brown for the Gendarmerie. After the war, the color was changed to black for all police units, and dark green for the Bundesgrenzschutz.

Meister, in compositions such as Polizeimeister or Wachtmeister, has a tradition in the ranks of various German police forces, partially also in Switzerland. During the Second World War, Meister was the highest enlisted rank of the German Ordnungspolizei (equivalent to the Stabsfeldwebel in the Wehrmacht, or Sturmscharführer in the Waffen-SS).

Currently, the German police in various lands is using the rank of Polizeimeister (=Master of the Police) instead. The rank insignia is two colored stars (the color depends on the land).

== See also ==
- Burgomaster
- Wachtmeister
