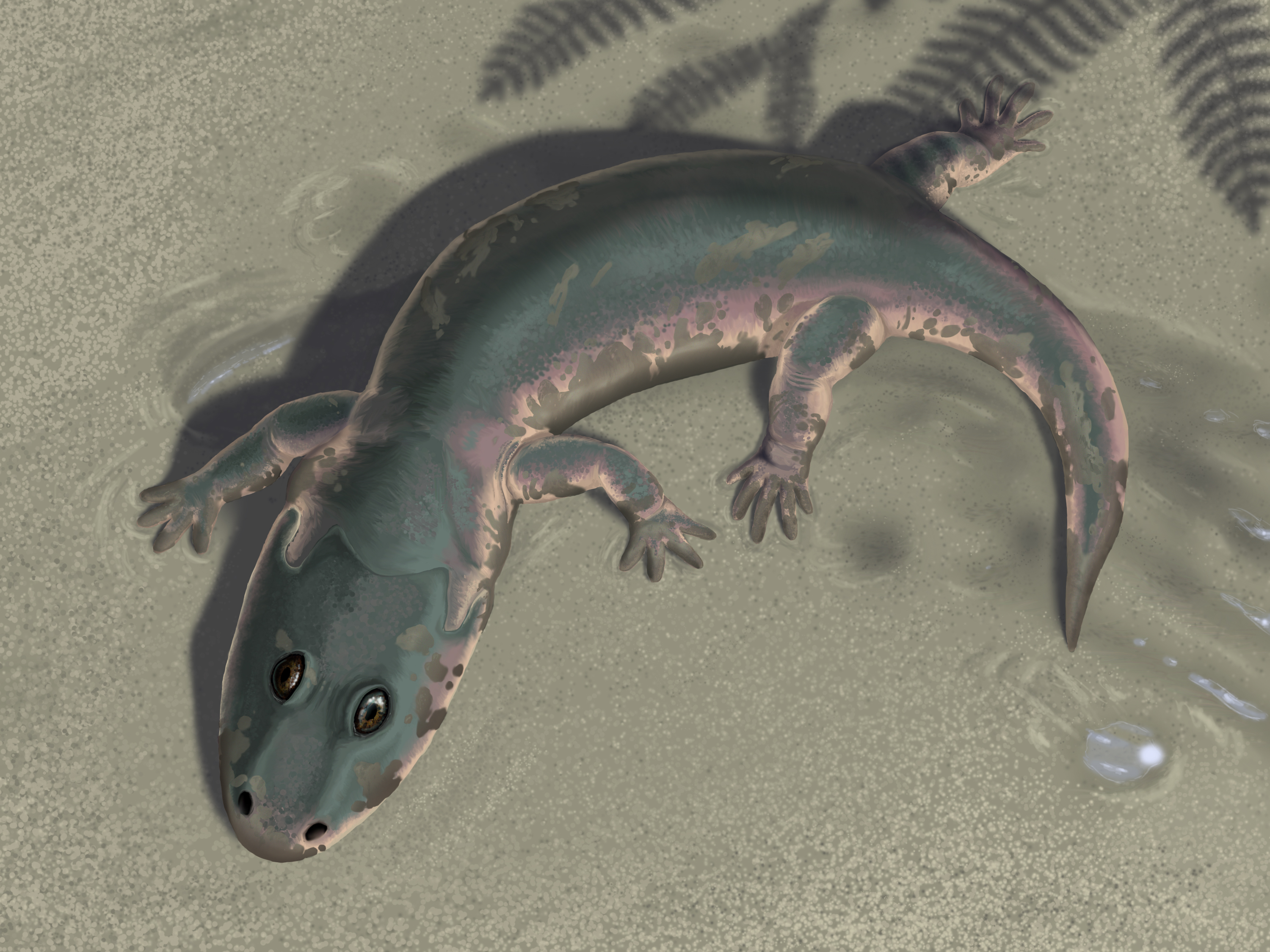
- Life restoration of Cryobatrachus kitchingi

Scientific classification
- Kingdom: Animalia
- Phylum: Chordata
- Clade: Tetrapoda
- Order: †Temnospondyli
- Suborder: †Stereospondyli
- Family: †Lydekkerinidae
- Genus: †Cryobatrachus; Colbert and Cosgriff, 1974

Type species
- †Cryobatrachus kitchingi Colbert and Cosgriff, 1974

= Cryobatrachus =

Cryobatrachus Temporal range: Early Triassic

Extinct genus of temnospondyls

Cryobatrachus (from Greek, κρύος (krýos, "cold") and βάτραχος (batrakhos, "frog")) is an extinct genus of temnospondyl amphibian from the Early Triassic of Antarctica. The type species is Cryobatrachus kitchingi. It is known from a partial skull and an imprint of the skull roof, both found in the Fremouw Formation of the Transantarctic Mountains at about 85° south latitude and described in 1974. Many small bone fragments have also been identified, although they cannot be attributed with certainty to C. kitchingi. Cryobatrachus has been classified in the family Lydekkerinidae, as it is similar in appearance to the genus Lydekkerina from South Africa.^{[a]} Because only a small number of features distinguish it from other lydekkerinids, Cryobatrachus kitchingi has more recently been considered a nomen dubium, meaning that its distinction from other better-known species may be unwarranted.

== Discovery and specimens ==
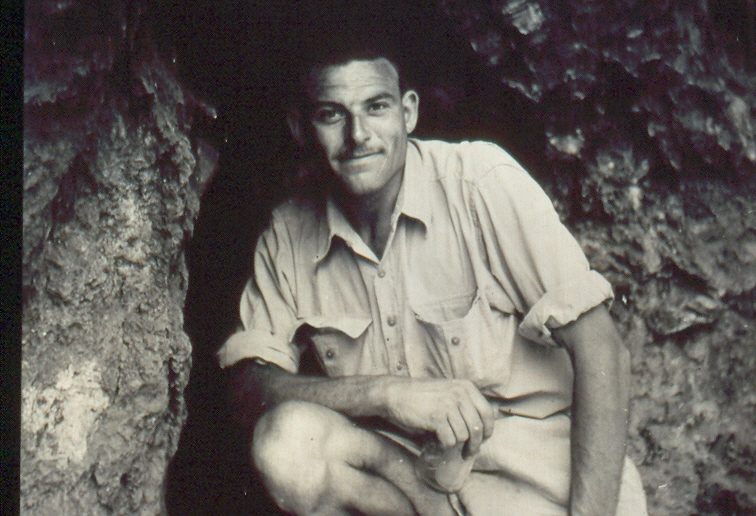
James Kitching, the discoverer of Cryobatrachus and the namesake of its type species, C. kitchingi

Fossils of Cryobatrachus were first found by South African paleontologist James Kitching in the austral summer of 1971–72 as part of an expedition headed by the Institute for Polar Studies at Ohio State University, now known as the Byrd Polar Research Center. Paleontologists Edwin Harris Colbert of the American Museum of Natural History and John Cosgriff of Wayne State University described these fossils in 1974, positing the new genus and species Cryobatrachus kitchingi with the specific name honoring Kitching. All specimens were uncovered from the lower part of the Fremouw Formation, which dates back to the Early Triassic. The holotype specimen, cataloged as AMNH 9503, is a partial skull with the ventral surface of the dermal bones present. The palate and braincase are not preserved. An additional paratype specimen called AMNH 9556 includes an impression of the skull roof, but no preserved bones. AMNH 9503 was found on Kitching Ridge (which is also named after James Kitching) near Shackleton Glacier, and AMNH 9556 was found on Mount Kenyon near McGregor Glacier. Two crushed skulls from Kitching Ridge were also considered possible specimens of Cryobatrachus, as was part of an upper jaw from Halfmoon Bluff (which is on the opposite side of Shackleton Glacier as Kitching Ridge). Colbert and Cosgriff tentatively attributed six smaller fragments from Coalsack Bluff to Cryobatrachus, including parts of lower jaw, the clavicle, and the interclavicle. Fifteen other Coalsack Bluff fragments, attributed as possible remains of Cryobatrachus based on their small size alone, were described. These bones included parts of the legs, hips, vertebrae, and skull. A 1977-78 expedition found a bone fragment on Collinson Ridge and an interclavicle on Shenk Peak southeast of the paratype locality on Mount Kenyon, both of which were referred to Cryobatrachus in 1984.

== Description ==
While most temnospondyls are characterized by features on the upper surface of the skull roof or the palate, only the underside of the skull roof is exposed in the holotype of Cryobatrachus. This part of the skull is not very well known in other temnospondyls, since it is normally hidden by the palate. The rock encasing the upper surface of the holotype skull was not removed because of time constraints during the 1971–72 expedition and fear that the specimen might be damaged.

Cryobatrachus is most similar in appearance to the temnospondyl Lydekkerina from South Africa, and to several other temnospondyls in the family Lydekkerinidae such as Limnoiketes. In all of these temnospondyls, the eye sockets are closer to the tip of the snout than they are to the back of the skull. The skull of Cryobatrachus is about 4.5 centimetres (1.8 in) long, smaller than those of Lydekkerina, which are normally 7 to 8 centimetres (2.8 to 3.1 in) long. Unlike Lydekkerina, Cryobatrachus has a slightly oval-shaped skull that is widest near its middle rather than at the very back. The eye sockets are spaced closer together than they are in Lydekkerina. The parietal foramen, a small hole at the top of the skull behind the eyes, is oval-shaped rather than circular as in most other temnospondyls. A space in the squamosal bone called the otic notch extends far into the skull, as in other lydekkerinids and a similar group of Triassic temnospondyls called rhinesuchids. However, the notch in Cryobatrachus is unusual in that it is crescent- rather than oval-shaped and that it ends in a sharp point rather than a rounded margin. Cryobatrachus can be distinguished from another group of Triassic temnospondyls called capitosaurians in that its quadratojugal bones (which make up the back of the upper jaws) end at the level of the tabular horns (which project from the back of the skull roof). In most capitosaurians, the quadratojugals extend past the tabular horns.

As is the case in other lydekkerinids, Cryobatrachus lacks the deep grooves on the skull that support a lateral line sensory system in other temnospondyls. The paratype specimen of Cryobatrachus shows that the upper surface of the skull was covered in small pits, with only a shallow groove running between the eye sockets. The lack of a lateral line system in Cryobatrachus and other lydekkerinids is usually taken as evidence that they spent most of their time on land, since lateral lines are typically only present in aquatic animals that use them to detect vibrations in water.

== Notes ==
1. During the Early Triassic, Antarctica and South Africa were near one another as both were part of the landmass Gondwana.
