= Texas Tech Shackleton Glacier Expedition =

The Texas Tech Shackleton Glacier Expedition took place first from 1962/63 and then again from 1964/65. The expedition, led by F. Alton Wade, was sponsored by Texas Technological College (now Texas Tech University). It explored areas of Antarctica.

== Exploration ==
Areas explored during and named by the expedition include:

- Matador Mountain– Named in honor of the Texas Tech student body, which was originally known as the Matadors.
- Red Raider Rampart– Named in honor of the Texas Tech student body, which is now known as the Red Raiders.
- Shanklin Glacier– Named in honor of CWO David M. Shanklin, USA, of the U.S. Army Aviation Detachment which supported the expedition.
- Ringed Nunatak, named for the ring of moraine that completely surrounds the nunatak.
- Shenk Peak– Named in honor of John C. Shenk, who was a Texas Tech graduate student and member of the expedition.
- Simplicity Hill– Named because of the ease with which they were able to approach the feature, and because of the relative simplicity of its geologic nature.
- Yeats Glacier– Named for Vestal L. "Pappy" Yeats, a Texas Tech faculty member and participant in the expedition in both 1962/63 and 1964/65.
