= Epidote Peak =

Mountain in the Ross Dependency, Antarctica

- Location within Antarctica

Geography
- Continent: Antarctica
- Range coordinates: 84°46′S 176°56′W
- Parent range: Queen Maud Mountains

Epidote Peak (84°46′S 176°56′W) is a prominent rock peak just north of the mouth of Held Glacier, lying along the west side of Shackleton Glacier in the Queen Maud Mountains of Antarctica. The Texas Tech Shackleton Glacier Expedition, 1964–65, named it for the abundance of the mineral epidote. Local concentrations of this mineral gives the peak a spotted appearance. The name was approved by US-ACAN in 1966.

== Geology ==
The steep slopes of Epidote Peak expose two distinct geologic units, the Greenlee and Taylor formations. Metasedimentary strata of Greenlee Formation only outcrop on the northern end of Mount Greenlee and the lower eastern slopes of Epidote Peak. The remainder of the exposed bedrock of Epidote Peak consists of metavolcanic rocks of the Taylor Formation. A ridge crest west of Epidote Peak exposes a third geologic unit composed of highly sheared undifferentiated marble and metasedimentary rocks.

The Greenlee Formation consists of beds of fine-grained, micaceous quartzite and argillite that form the eastern slopes of Epidote Peak on the west side of Shackleton Glacier. They have been metamorphosed from what were originally feldspathic graywackes, quart siltstones and shales. The clay fraction of the original sedimentary rocks has been recrystallized into biotite and in some cases biotite-hornblende-epidote. The foliation in these strata has developed parallel to bedding. At the base of the slopes of Epdiote Peak that are adjacent ot Shackleton Glacier, the micaceous quartzites and argillites are intruded by granitic migmatitic gneisses. The quartzites are dark gray to brown and occur in beds that range in thickness from 0.05–1 m (0.16–3.28 ft). Many of the beds exhibit fine laminations. Some of these strata are slightly calcareous. The grain size of the original sediments that initially comprised these quartzites and their even bedding indicate that they were deposited in a very low energy environment. The strata within the Greenlee Formation strike northwest-southeast to north-south and dip southwest-west.

Overlying the Greenlee Formation at Epidote Peak is the Taylor Formation. It consists of a series of highly metamorphosed and sheared basaltic lava flows interbedded with graywackes and felsitic volcanic rocks. Some of the basaltic lava flows are amygdaloidal and some are brecciated along with the interbedded graywacke in shear zones. Plagioclase is sometimes observed as phenocrysts 1 mm (0.039 in) in what might be intermediate-mafic lava flows. Within the ridge crest west of Epidote Peak, the Taylor Formation consists of highly sheared silicic volcanic rocks, typically porphyritic felsite. These rocks exhibit shades of brown and gray and may be porphyritic or non-porphyritic. Considerable amounts non-porphyritic felsite or, alternatively, chert is also present within these silicic volcanic rocks. Epidote is common as vein filling in cracks.

At the western ends of ridges associated with Epidote Peak, thick beds of white, coarsely crystalline marble are exposed. On one ridge, a bed of marble that is tectonically pinched from a thickness of 100 to 10 m (328 to 33 ft) between massive felsite in a distance of 100 m (330 ft). Thin, circa 2 to 4 cm (0.79 to 1.57 in) thick, beds of quartzite within the marble are ripped apart and disharmonically folded. East of the outcrop of this deformed marble bed, several other 10 to 15 m (33 to 49 ft) thick marble beds are exposed. The relationship of the marble beds to each other and the Taylor and Greenlee formations is completely obscured by intense cataclasis and shearing of them and enclosing strata. A similar bed of white marble crops out on the summit of Epidote Peak. These marble beds are currently correlated with the early Cambrian Shackleton Limestone of the Holyoake and Churchill mountains.

The strata that form Epidote Peak and associated ridges are metamorphic rocks and intrusive granitic rocks that are part of the Ross orogenic belt, which is exposed throughout the Transantarctic Mountains. These are former sedimentary rocks involved in the Neoproterozoic to early Paleozoic Ross orogeny. Elsewhere in the Transantarctic Mountains, these metamorphic rocks and intrusive granitic rocks are truncated by a regionally extensive unconformity known as the Kukri peneplain. The Kukri peneplain is overlain by relatively undeformed Devonian–Jurassic sedimentary rocks of the Beacon Supergroup.
