= Prince Olav Mountains =

Mountain range in Antarctica

- Location within Antarctica

Highest point
- Elevation: 4,125 m (13,533 ft)
- Prominence: 1,542 m (5,059 ft)
- Listing: Ultra; Ribu

Geography
- Continent: Antarctica
- Region: Ross Dependency
- Range coordinates: 84°57′S 173°00′W

The Prince Olav Mountains (84°57′S 173°00′W) is a mountain group in the Queen Maud Mountains in Antarctica stretching from Shackleton Glacier to Liv Glacier at the head of the Ross Ice Shelf.

== Discovery and naming ==
The Prince Olav Mountains were discovered in 1911 by Roald Amundsen on the way to the South Pole, and named by him for the then Crown Prince Olav of Norway.

== Main peaks ==
This range includes the following high mountains and peaks:

Mountain/Peak	Metres	Feet	Coordinates
Mount Wade	4,084	13,399	84°51′S 174°19′W
Mount Fisher	4,080	13,390	85°06′S 171°03′W
Centennial Peak	4,070	13,350	84°57′S 174°00′W
Mount Ray	3,904	12,808	85°07′S 170°48′W
Mount Sellery	3,895	12,779	84°58′S 172°45′W
Mount Oliver	3,800	12,500	84°56′S 173°44′W
Mount Campbell	3,790	12,430	84°55′S 174°00′W
Jones Peak	3,670	12,040	85°05′S 172°00′W
Mount Finley	3,470	11,380	85°01′S 173°58′W
Mount Smithson	3,000	9,800	84°59′S 172°10′W

== Location ==
The Prince Olav Mountains extend in a generally northwest – southeast direction between the Shackleton Glacier to the west and the Liv Glacier to the east. The Gabbro Hills and Lillie Range are to the northeast. In the northwest the mountains include the Waldron Spurs, including Nilsen Peak and Mount Orndorff, the Longhorn Spurs, including Cape Surprise, Garden Spur and Olds Peak, and Cathedral Peaks including Mount Kenney, McCuistion Glacier and Lubbock Rudge, all to the west of Barrett Glacier. The Dick Glacier runs west to the Shackleton Glacier to the south of Lubbock Ridge.

The central part of the range is separated from the Gabbro Hills by Watt Ridge, terminating in Mount Llano. It includes, from northwest to southeast, Mount McCue, Mount Munson, Mount Wade, Mount Campbell, Mount Oliver, Mount Dodge, Mount Sellery and Mount Smithson. The Holzrichter Glacier, Krout Glacier and Harwell Glacier drain east into Gough Glacier. The Yeats Glacier drains west into Shackleton Glacier. The Mount Finley massif is southwest of the central portion, north of the McGregor Glacier, which flows west to the Shackleton Glacier. It is north of the Cumulus Hills.

The southeastern part of the Prince Olaf Mountains include Jones Peak and the Seabee Heights to the southwest of the DeGanahl Glacier, which joins the LaVergne Glacier east of Garcia Point. North of the DeGanahl Glacier are, from west to east, Mount Fisher, Mount Ray, Mount Wells, Mount Roe and Mercie Peak, opposite Hardiman Peak where Zotikov Glacier joins Liv Glacier from the west.

== Western features ==
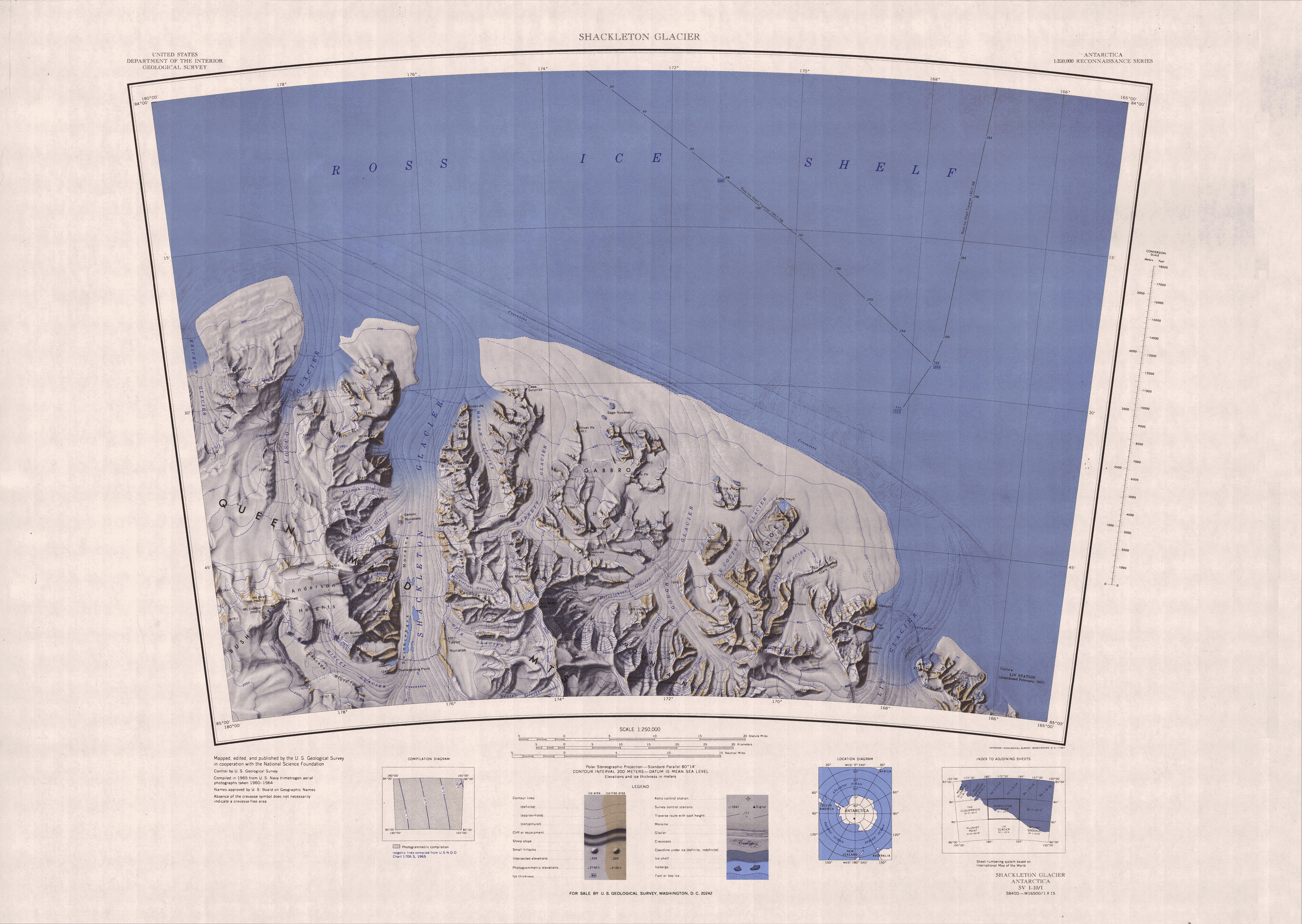
Prince Olav Mountains center south of map

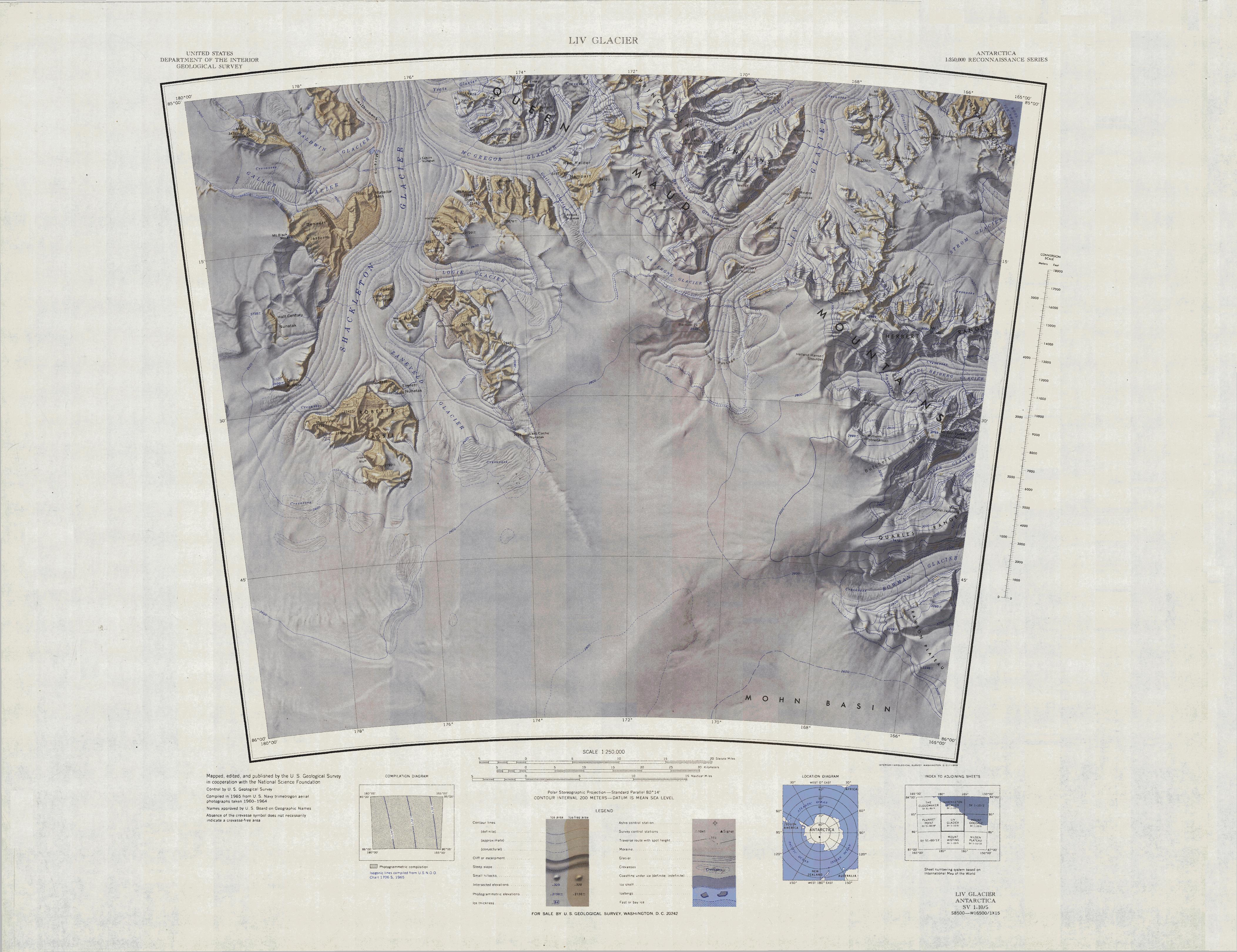
Prince Olav Mountains northeast of map

Features extending northwest of the range, just east of the Shackleton Glacier, include:

=== Waldron Spurs ===
84°35′S 175°40′W. A group of rocky spurs at the east side of the terminus of Shackleton Glacier in the foothills of the Queen Maud Mountains. Discovered by the United States Antarctic Service (United States Antarctic Service) (1939–41), and named by the United States Advisory Committee on Antarctic Names (US-ACAN) for Lieutenant Commander James E. Waldron, United States Navy Reserve, pilot with Squadron VX-6 in 1957-58.

=== Nilsen Peak ===
84°32′S 175°25′W. A prominent peak 780 metres (2,560 ft) high at the north end of Waldron Spurs, marking the east side of the mouth of Shackleton Glacier. Named by US-ACAN for W.B. Nilsen, Master of the United States Naval Ship Chattahoochee during Operation Deep Freeze 1965.

=== Mount Orndorff ===
84°37′S 175°26′W. A peak 1,520 metres (4,990 ft) high standing 5 nautical miles (9.3 km; 5.8 mi) south of Nilsen Peak, at the west side of Massam Glacier. Named by US-ACAN for Lieutenant Commander Howard J. Orndorff, United States Navy, a member of the winter party at McMurdo Station in 1963.

=== Longhorn Spurs ===
84°36′S 174°45′W. A high ridge, 12 nautical miles (22 km; 14 mi) long, extending north from the Prince Olav Mountains between Massam and Barrett Glaciers to the edge of the Ross Ice Shelf. A series of rock spurs extend from the west side. Visited and so named by the Texas Tech Shackleton Glacier Party (1964–65) because of the resemblance of the spurs to the horns of longhorn cattle.

=== Cape Surprise ===
84°31′S 174°25′W. A cape marking the northern end of Longhorn Spurs, between Massam and Barrett Glaciers, at the edge of the Ross Ice Shelf. It is composed of rocks of the Beacon and Ferrar groups. So named by the Southern Party of NZGSAE (1963–64) because this is the first place where rocks of these groups have been found on the coast, surprising the geologists.

=== Garden Spur ===
84°33′S 174°45′W. A spur on the west side of Longhorn Spurs, 3 nautical miles (5.6 km; 3.5 mi) south of Cape Surprise. So named by the Southern Party of New Zealand Geological Survey Antarctic Expedition (NZGSAE) (1963–64) because of the rich flora of mosses, algae and lichens found there.

=== Olds Peak ===
84°40′S 174°41′W. A peak 1,480 metres (4,860 ft) high standing 6 nautical miles (11 km; 6.9 mi) northeast of Mount Kenney in the south part of Longhorn Spurs, Queen Maud Mountains. Named by US-ACAN for Commander Corwin A. Olds, United States Navy, who participated in Antarctic Support Activity during United States Navy OpDFrz 1964.

=== Mount Wendland ===
84°42′S 175°18′W. A peak 1,650 metres (5,410 ft) high near the head of Massam Glacier, 2 nautical miles (3.7 km; 2.3 mi) northeast of Mount Kenney, in the Prince Olav Mountains. The feature was geologically mapped on November 18, 1970, by the United States Antarctic Research Program (USARP) Ohio State University Party of 1970-71. Named by US-ACAN for Vaughn P. Wendland, geologist and field assistant with the Ohio State party.

=== Cathedral Peaks ===
84°44′S 175°40′W. A rugged mountain mass surmounted by several conspicuous peaks, located north of Lubbock Ridge and extending for about 8 nautical miles (15 km; 9.2 mi) along the east margin of Shackleton Glacier. From the glacier the peaks resemble the spires and turrets of a cathedral. Named by F. Alton Wade, who worked in this area as leader of the Texas Tech Shackleton Glacier Party, 1962-63.

=== Mount Kenney ===
84°44′S 175°28′W. A sharp summit 2,030 metres (6,660 ft) high in the Cathedral Peaks, rising 3 nautical miles (5.6 km; 3.5 mi) east of Shackleton Glacier and 10 nautical miles (19 km; 12 mi) northwest of Mount Wade. Discovered and photographed by United States Navy Operation Highjump, 1946–47. Named by US-ACAN for 1st Lieutenant Leroy S. Kenney, United States Marine Corps Reserve, helicopter and airplane pilot with United States Navy Squadron VX-6 during Deep Freeze operations.

=== Mount Ehrenspeck ===
84°46′S 175°35′W. One of the Cathedral Peaks, a group of summits that form a portion of the wall on the east side of Shackleton Glacier. The peak is 2,090 metres (6,860 ft) high and stands 2 nautical miles (3.7 km; 2.3 mi) southwest of Mount Kenney. Named by US-ACAN for Helmut Ehrenspeck, geologist with the Ohio State University Party of 1970–71 which geologically mapped this vicinity.

=== Lubbock Ridge ===
85°50′S 175°25′W. A high ridge, about 5 nautical miles (9.3 km; 5.8 mi) long, extending west from Mount Wade and terminating in a steep bluff at the east side of Shackleton Glacier. Named by F. Alton Wade, leader of the Texas Tech Shackleton Glacier Party (1962–63), in honor of Lubbock, Texas, home of Texas Technological College, to which all three members of the party were affiliated.

== Central features ==
=== Watt Ridge ===
84°45′S 173°47′W. A ridge, 7 nautical miles (13 km; 8.1 mi) long, extending northwest from Mount Llano and terminating at the east side of Barrett Glacier. Named by US-ACAN for Lieutenant Commander Robert C. Watt, United States Navy, Supply Officer during United States Navy OpDFrz 1964.

=== Mount Llano ===
84°48′S 173°21′W. A mountain peak 1,930 metres (6,330 ft) high in the foothills of the Prince Olav Mountains, standing 6 nautical miles (11 km; 6.9 mi) northeast of Mount Wade. Surveyed by the United States Ross Ice Shelf Traverse Party (1957–58) under A.P. Crary. Named after George Albert Llano, American biologist and authority on polar lichems; Program Manager for Biological and Medical Sciences, Office of Polar Programs, National Science Foundation, 1960–77; member of several seasonal expeditions to Antarctica from 1957-58.

=== Mount McCue ===
84°45′S 174°41′W. A peak 1,710 metres (5,610 ft) high standing 5.5 nautical miles (10.2 km; 6.3 mi) northwest of Mount Wade. Discovered by the United States Antarctic Service, 1939-41. Surveyed by A.P. Crary (1957–58) and named by him for James A. McCue, United States Navy, radio mechanic, who was in charge of the first Beardmore Camp during the 1957–58 season.

=== Mount Munson ===
84°48′S 174°26′W. A mountain 2,800 metres (9,200 ft) high rising from the northwest flank of Mount Wade, 3 nautical miles (5.6 km; 3.5 mi) from its summit. Discovered and photographed by R. Admiral Byrd on flights to the Queen Maud Mountains in November 1929. Named by US-ACAN for Capt. William H. Munson, United States Navy, Commanding Officer of United States Navy Air Development Squadron Six, otherwise known as VX-6, 1959-61.

=== Mount Wade ===
84°51′S 174°19′W. A massive mountain 4,085 metres (13,402 ft) high which is a most distinctive landmark in its region, standing 4 nautical miles (7.4 km; 4.6 mi) northwest of Mount Campbell. The feature is easily viewed from positions on Shackleton Glacier or the Ross Ice Shelf. Discovered and photographed by R. Admiral Byrd on flights to the Queen Maud Mountains in November 1929. Named by US-SCAN after Franklin Alton Wade (1903–78), geologist with the ByrdAE (1933–35), senior scientist at West Base of the US AS (1939–41), and leader of two Texas Tech Shackleton Glacier Parties (1962–63 and 1964–65) to this vicinity; Senior Scientist USARP Marie Byrd Land Survey, 1966–67 and 1967-68.

=== Centennial Peak ===
84°57′S 174°00′W. A peak 4,070 metres (13,350 ft) high situated 6.5 nautical miles (12.0 km; 7.5 mi) south-southeast of Mount Wade. Mapped by USGS from surveys and United States Navy air photos 1960-65. Named by US-ACAN in recognition of the Centennial of the Ohio State University in 1970, the same year the University's Institute of Polar Studies celebrated its Decennial. The University and the Institute have been very active in Antarctic investigations since 1960.

=== Mount Campbell ===
84°55′S 174°00′W. A prominent peak 3,790 metres (12,430 ft) high standing 3.5 nautical miles (6.5 km; 4.0 mi) southeast of Mount Wade. Discovered and photographed by the United States Antarctic Service (1939–41), and surveyed by A.P. Crary (1957–58). Named by Crary for Joel Campbell of the United States Coast and Geodetic Survey, Antarctic Project Leader for geomagnetic operations, 1957-60.

=== Mount Oliver ===
84°56′S 173°44′W. A peak over 3,800 metres (12,500 ft) high, standing 2 nautical miles (3.7 km; 2.3 mi) southeast of Mount Campbell. Discovered and photographed by the United States Antarctic Service, 1939-41. Surveyed by A.P. Crary (1957–58) and named by him for Norman Oliver, Air Force Cambridge Research Center, who was Antarctic Project Leader for aurora operations, 1957-60.

=== Mount Dodge ===
84°52′S 172°22′W. A mainly ice-free peak 1,760 metres (5,770 ft) high on a mountain spur descending northward from the Prince Olav Mountains, at the confluence of Holzrichter and Gough Glaciers. Discovered by the United States Ross Ice Shelf Traverse Party (1957–58) under A.P. Crary, and named for Professor Carroll William Dodge, who analyzed and reported upon lichens and lichen parasites for the ByrdAE. 1933-35.

=== Mount Sellery ===
84°58′S 172°45′W. A prominent peak 3,895 metres (12,779 ft) high between Mounts Oliver and Smithson. Discovered and photographed by Rear Admiral Byrd on the Baselaying Flight of Nov. 18, 1929, and surveyed by A.P. Crary in 1957-58. Named by Crary for Harry Sellery of the United States National Bureau of Standards, who was Antarctic Project Leader for ionosphere studies, 1957-60.

=== Mount Smithson ===
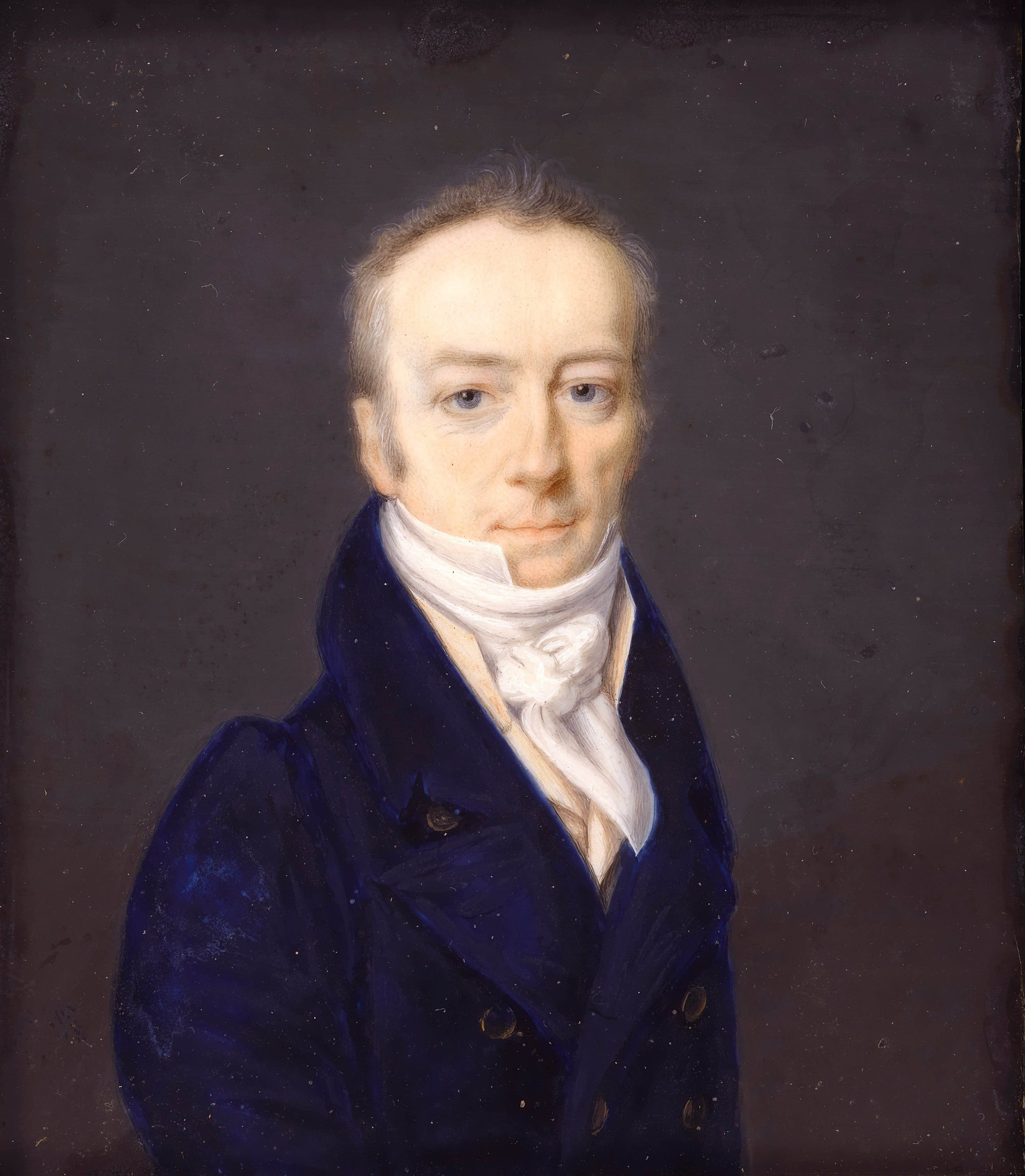
James Smithson 1816

84°59′S 172°10′W. A mountain over 3,000 metres (9,800 ft) high along the north escarpment of the Prince Olav Mountains, standing 3 nautical miles (5.6 km; 3.5 mi) east of Mount Sellery between the heads of Krout and Harwell Glaciers. Named by US-ACAN for James Smithson, English philanthropist. In 1835, his property came into the possession of the United States Government, having been bequeathed by him for the purpose of founding an institution at Washington, DC, to be called the Smithsonian Institution for the increase and diffusion of knowledge among men.

== Eastern features ==
=== Jones Peak ===
85°05′S 172°00′W. A mainly ice-free peak, 3,670 metres (12,040 ft) high, standing 5 nautical miles (9.3 km; 5.8 mi) west-northwest of Mount Fisher at the head of DeGanahl Glacier. Named by US-ACAN for John M. Jones, Program Officer of the Committee on Polar Research, National Academy of Sciences, 1957-63.

=== Seabee Heights ===
85°13′S 171°15′W. Rugged snow-covered heights rising to 3,400 metres (11,200 ft) high. The heights are about 15 nautical miles (28 km; 17 mi) long and 5 nautical miles (9.3 km; 5.8 mi) wide and are bounded by the flow of the DeGanahl, LaVergne and Liv Glaciers. Named by US-ACAN for the United States Navy Construction Battalions (Seabees) which have played a significant role in the building of United States Antarctic stations.

=== Garcia Point ===
85°14′S 170°16′W. A conspicuous point which forms the south side of the terminus of DeGanahl Glacier, where the latter enters Liv Glacier. Named by US-ACAN for Leopoldo Garcia, USARP meteorologist at South Pole Station, winter 1965.

=== Mount Fisher ===
85°06′S 171°03′W. A domed, snow-capped summit 4,080 metres (13,390 ft) high standing 2 nautical miles (3.7 km; 2.3 mi) northwest of Mount Ray. Discovered and photographed by R. Admiral Byrd on flights to the Queen Maud Mountains in November 1929, and named by him for the Fisher brothers, Detroit industrialists and contributors to the ByrdAE, 1928-30.

=== Mount Ray ===
85°07′S 170°48′W. A peak, 3,905 metres (12,812 ft) high, standing 1.5 nautical miles (2.8 km; 1.7 mi) southeast of Mount Fisher. Named by US-ACAN for Carleton Ray, USARP zoologist at McMurdo Station in the 1963–64, 1964–65, and 1965–66 summer seasons.

=== Mount Wells ===
85°10′S 169°48′W. A massive ice-covered mountain standing at the west side of Liv Glacier, about 4 nautical miles (7.4 km; 4.6 mi) northwest of June Nunatak. Named by US-ACAN for Harry Wells, Executive Secretary of the Committee on Polar Research, National Academy of Sciences, 1962-66.

=== Mount Roe ===
85°08′S 169°36′W. A flattish, largely ice-covered mountain overlooking the west side of Liv Glacier. It stands 1 nautical mile (1.9 km; 1.2 mi) northeast of Mount Wells at the southeast end of Prince Olav Mountains. Named by US-ACAN for Lieutenant Donald W. Roe, Jr., of US Navy Squadron VX-6, a member of the 1961 winter party at McMurdo Station and squadron safety officer in the 1962-63 season.

=== Mercik Peak ===
85°05′S 169°06′W. A conspicuous peak, 1,425 metres (4,675 ft) high, located 7 nautical miles (13 km; 8.1 mi) northeast of Mount Wells, on the ridge descending from the latter. Named by US-ACAN for James E. Mercik, USARP aurora scientist at South Pole Station, winter 1965.

=== Hardiman Peak ===
85°01′S 169°23′W. A peak, 1,210 metres (3,970 ft) high, forming the east extremity of the ridge along the north side of Zotikov Glacier. Named by US-ACAN for Terrance L. Hardiman, USARP geomagnetist/seismologist at South Pole Station, 1965.

== Sources ==
- Alberts, Fred G., ed. (1995), Geographic Names of the Antarctic (PDF) (2 ed.), United States Board on Geographic Names This article incorporates public domain material from websites or documents of the United States Board on Geographic Names.
- Liv Glacier, USGS: United States Geological Survey
- Shackleton Glacier, USGS: United States Geological Survey

This article incorporates public domain material from websites or documents of the United States Geological Survey.
