= James Kitching =

South African vertebrate palaeontologist

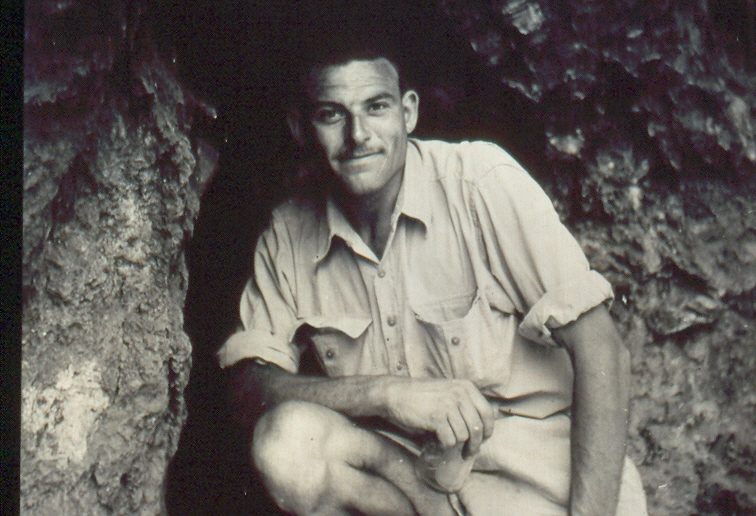
- Kitching in 1947
- Born: 6 February 1922
- Died: 24 December 2003 (aged 81)
- Education: University of the Witwatersrand
- Scientific career
- Fields: Vertebrate paleontology
- Workplaces: University of the Witwatersrand

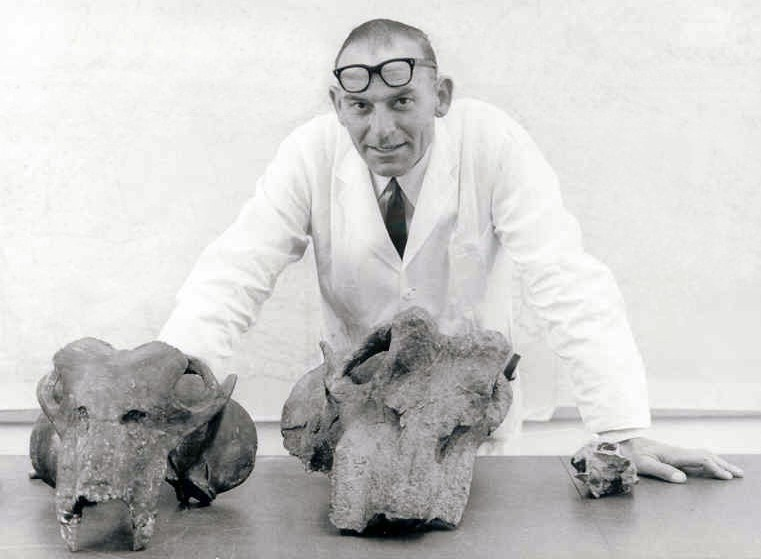
Kitching with Lystrosaurus fossils

James William Kitching (6 February 1922 – 24 December 2003) was a South African vertebrate palaeontologist and regarded as one of the world’s greatest fossil finders.

== Career ==
His work in the southern hemisphere, including Antarctica, led to the establishment of one of the world's finest fossil collections, housed at the Bernard Price Institute for Palaeontological Research (BPI) in Johannesburg. He contributed greatly to the Karoo palaeontology of southern Africa, and Gondwana, and was an authority on the stratigraphic and distributional relationships of Permo-Triassic reptiles from South Africa. He published more than fifty papers and books on various facets of palaeontology. His contribution to Karoo palaeontology of southern Africa and Gondwana, earned him international recognition.

Kitching also studied Pleistocene mammals. In this regard he excavated and researched fossils from several cave sites, the most notable being the Cave of Hearths and the limeworks at Makapansgat where he discovered the type specimen of what Professor Raymond Dart described as a new species of the "ape man" Australopithecus, A. prometheus in 1947. This is now considered a synonym of the type species, A. africanus, which Dart described in 1925. Together with Professor Raymond Dart, he undertook pioneering taphonomic research on the bone accumulations at Makapansgat. These projects entailed spending time in the Netherlands, Belgium and France to study Palaeolithic mammalian faunas; he was also involved in the analysis of fossils from Pinhole Cave in England.

Despite not having had a standard undergraduate academic background, he was permitted by the Senate of the University of the Witwatersrand to register for a Master of Science degree. For his research on Karoo fossils, completed in 1972, he was awarded a doctorate. Having refined the biostratigraphy of the rocks of the Beaufort Group in South Africa, he started a major collecting project in the Triassic and Jurassic rocks of the Elliot and Clarens Formations in South Africa, and published the first biostratigraphic scheme for these lithological units as well.

== Awards and honours ==
At the time of his retirement at the age of 68 in 1990, Professor James Kitching was Reader in Karoo Biostratigraphy and also Director of the Bernard Price Institute for Palaeontological Research. Subsequently, he was appointed Honorary Research Professorial Fellow at the Institute, a position he held until his death. He received numerous national and international awards including honorary doctorates from UPE and Wits, the Gold Award of the Zoological Society of South Africa, The Draper Award of the Geological Society of South Africa, honorary life membership of the Society of Vertebrate Paleontology in the United States and the Palaeontological Society of Southern Africa, and most recently the prestigious Morris Skinner Award of the Society of Vertebrate Paleontology.

== Early life ==
His introduction to fossils and collecting started at the age of six, when he scoured the countryside around Nieu-Bethesda, where he grew up, to find specimens for Robert Broom. A year later he discovered the type specimen of Youngopsis kitchingi Broom. This fossil was the first of many new species which he would present to science in later years. When the University of the Witwatersrand set up the Bernard Price Institute for Palaeontological Research, he was appointed as the first member of staff on 26 October 1945 and mandated to collect fossils from the Karoo. His first collecting trip was to the Graaff-Reinet district where he had spent his youth with his brothers Ben and Scheepers.

== Footnotes ==
A prominent rock ridge (85°12′S 177°06′W) on the west side of Shackleton Glacier, between Bennett Platform and Matador Mountain, in the Queen Maud Mountains in Antarctica is officially mapped 'Kitching Ridge' in his honour. Invited to join the Ohio State University Institute of Polar Studies 1970-71 geological party to the Queen Maud Mountains as part of the US Antarctic Research Programme, he, together with James (Jim) Collinson, was the first person to identify and collect therapsid (proto-mammal) fossils there, of Lystrosaurus Zone age, confirming the former continental link between southern Africa and Antarctica.

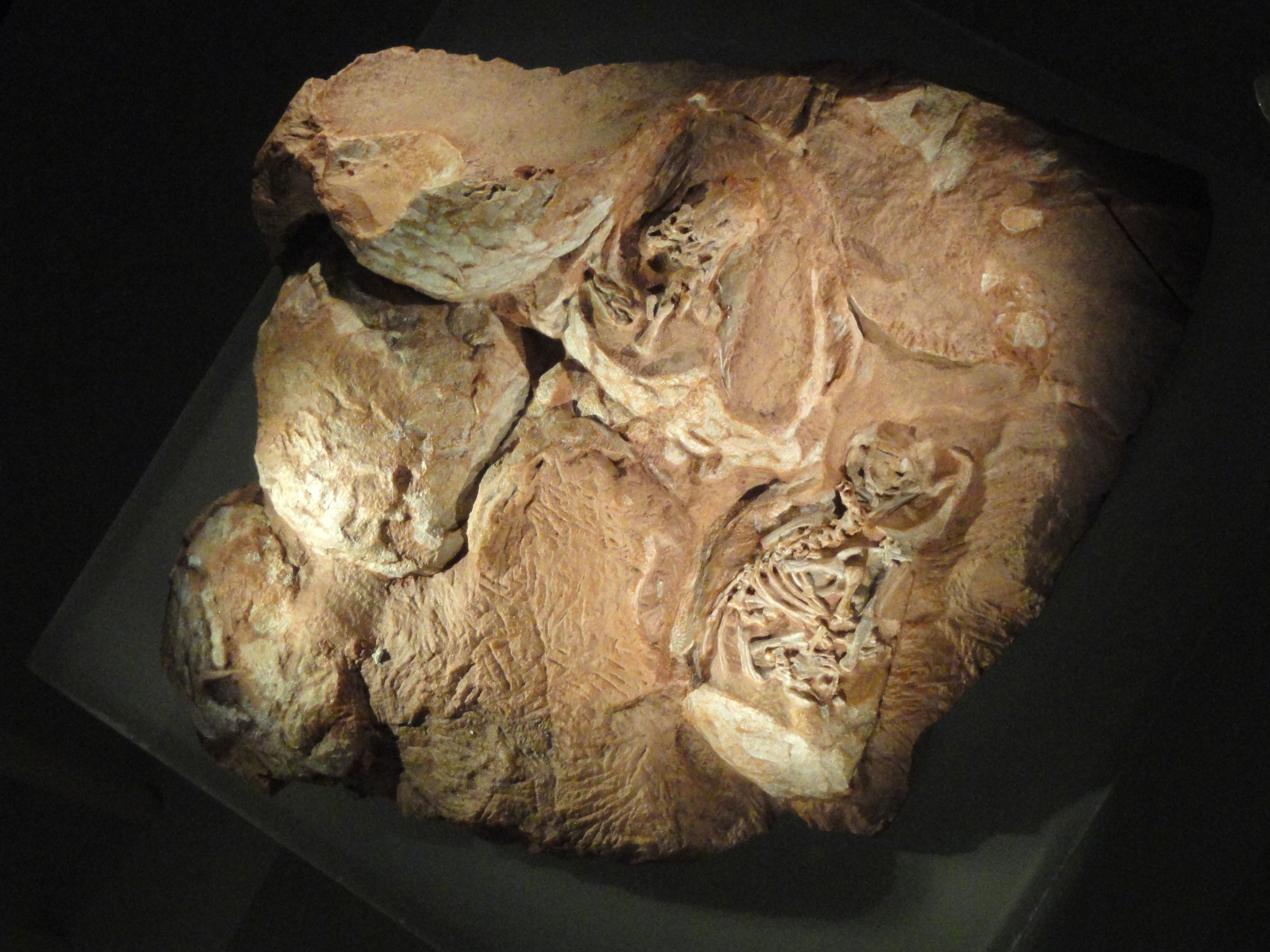
Cast of eggs and an embryo, Royal Ontario Museum

In 1977 James Kitching recovered seven Massospondylus eggs that had been exposed by roadmaking operations in the Golden Gate Highlands National Park in South Africa. In January 2000, Professor Robert Reisz from the University of Toronto at Mississauga in Canada was on a research visit to South Africa and borrowed the fossil eggs to take back to Canada. Diane Scott of his laboratory carried out the difficult preparation under a high magnification microscope. Hans Sues, a Smithsonian palaeontologist who helped analyse the 190-million-year-old eggs — the oldest from a vertebrate animal ever discovered — confirmed that Kitching had been correct in his identification of the eggs. The embryos are so well preserved, that they have yielded remarkable insights into dinosaur biology and behaviour. They are the oldest evidence for caregiving among dinosaurs in that the animals' undeveloped teeth suggest that Massospondylus hatchlings needed help in feeding.

He married Betty Kitching and had a family of one son and two daughters.

== Sources ==
- Tribute to James Kitching by Bruce Rubidge & Mike Raath (Bernard Price Institute for Palaeontological Research)
