= Franklin Alton Wade =

American geologist

Franklin Alton Wade (1903–1978) was an American geologist. One of his chief scientific interests was the geology of Antarctica, to which he traveled several times, including twice with the explorer Admiral Richard E. Byrd.

== Early life ==
Wade was born in Akron, Ohio, in 1903. He received Bachelor of Science and Master of Arts degrees at the same ceremony in 1926, from Kenyon College in Ohio. After working for a short time as an industrial chemist, he enrolled in a PhD programme at Johns Hopkins University.

== Antarctic expeditions and research ==
Wade was a member of the second Antarctic expedition led by the Admiral Richard E. Byrd in 1933. While there, he was part of a 77-day sled journey into Marie Byrd Land. The field work on this expedition was later the foundation of his doctoral dissertation.

Wade was then selected by Byrd to take the role of chief scientist for his third Antarctic expedition. On this expedition he took two students with him, a practice he would continue in his later expeditions.

He was geologist with the Byrd Antarctic Expedition (1933–35), senior scientist at West Base of the U.S. Antarctic Service (USAS) (1939–41), and leader of two Texas Technological College (Texas Tech) Shackleton Glacier Parties (1962–63 and 1964–65) and Senior Scientist U.S. Antarctic Research Program (USARP), Marie Byrd Land Survey, 1966–67 and 1967–68. The Marie Byrd Land Survey was a complex operation involving fixed wing and helicopter camps. A major product of that project was a series of geologic and topographic maps of scale 1:250,000.

Wade personally nominated for naming, by the U.S. Board of Geographic Names, several Antarctic mountains and ridges whilst he worked as leader of the Texas Tech Shackleton Glacier Party, 1962–63. These include:

- Cathedral Peaks (84°44′S 175°40′W), a rugged mountain mass that Wade perceived to have spires, resembling a cathedral, when viewed from the Shackleton Glacier.
- Lubbock Ridge (84°52′S 175°25′W) a high ridge around 5 nautical miles (9 km) long, which extends west from Mount Wade and terminates in a steep bluff at the east side of Shackleton Glacier. Wade named this ridge for Lubbock, where Texas Tech University is located.
- Mount Kenyon (85°10′S 174°52′W) a mountain, 2,260 metres (7,400 ft) high, which stands 1 nautical mile (2 km) northwest of Shenk Peak in the northern part of the Cumulus Hills. He named the mountain after Kenyon College, Ohio, which he had attended almost 30 years before the expedition.

== Academia ==
During his PhD programme, Wade worked as a instructor in geology at the University of Delaware. Wade accepted a similar position at the Miami University in his home state of Ohio in 1936. He then received his Doctor of Philosophy degree from Johns Hopkins University in 1937.

He was head of the Geology department at Texas Tech University, but resigned the position in 1964 to focus on active Antarctic research. His successor in the position, Richard Maddox, later said: "For Al, the paperwork and meetings were a waste of the time he could have spent in teaching and research."

== Legacy ==
Two weeks after his death from a heart attack on October 1, 1978, Congressman George H. Mahon made a tribute to Wade in front of the United States House of Representatives in praise of Wade's achievements, his "enthusiasm for life, his Christian dedication and his youthful spirit."

Mount Wade is named for Wade. It was first discovered by Roald Amundsen in 1911. It has the highest elevation of any of the Prince Olav Mountains, at 4,085 m (13,402 ft).

== Bibliography ==
- Wade, F. Alton (1945). "An Introduction to the Symposium on Scientific Results of the United States Antarctic Service Expedition, 1939-1941". Proceedings of the American Philosophical Society. 89 (1): 1–3. ISSN 0003-049X. JSTOR 985310.
- Wade, Franklin Alton; Mattox, Richard Benjamin (1960). Elements of Crystallography and Mineralogy. Harper. p. 332.
