= Erb Range =

Mountain range in Antarctica

- Location within Antarctica

Geography
- Continent: Antarctica
- Range coordinates: 84°38′00″S 177°36′00″W
- Parent range: Queen Maud Mountains

The Erb Range (84°38′00″S 177°36′00″W) is a rugged mountain range rising to 2,240 metres (7,350 ft) between Kosco Glacier and Shackleton Glacier in the Queen Maud Mountains, and extending north from Anderson Heights to Mount Speed on the west side of the Ross Ice Shelf.

== Discovery and naming ==
The range was photographed from aircraft of the United States Antarctic Service Expedition, 1939–41, and surveyed by A.P. Crary, leader of the U.S. Ross Ice Shelf Traverse, 1957–58. It was named by the Advisory Committee on Antarctic Names in 2008 after Karl A. Erb who played a major role in guiding the United States Antarctic Program as both the National Science Foundation (NSF) Senior Science Advisor in the mid 1990s and subsequently as Director of the Office of Polar Programs from 1998 until 2007 and beyond. During his tenure as the Senior Science Advisor, he helped to guide NSF through the process of justifying and then securing Congressional funding for the redevelopment of the South Pole Station.

== Location ==
Extending north from Anderson Heights the features along the west side of the lower Shackleton Glacier include (from south to north) Mount Butters, just north of the Mincey Glacier, Thanksgiving Point, Mount Greenlee, Held Glacier, Epidote Peak, Geyasimou Glacier, Mount Cole, Forman Glacier, Mount Franke, Mount Wasko, McGinnis Peak, Oppegaard Spur and Mount Speed.

== Features ==
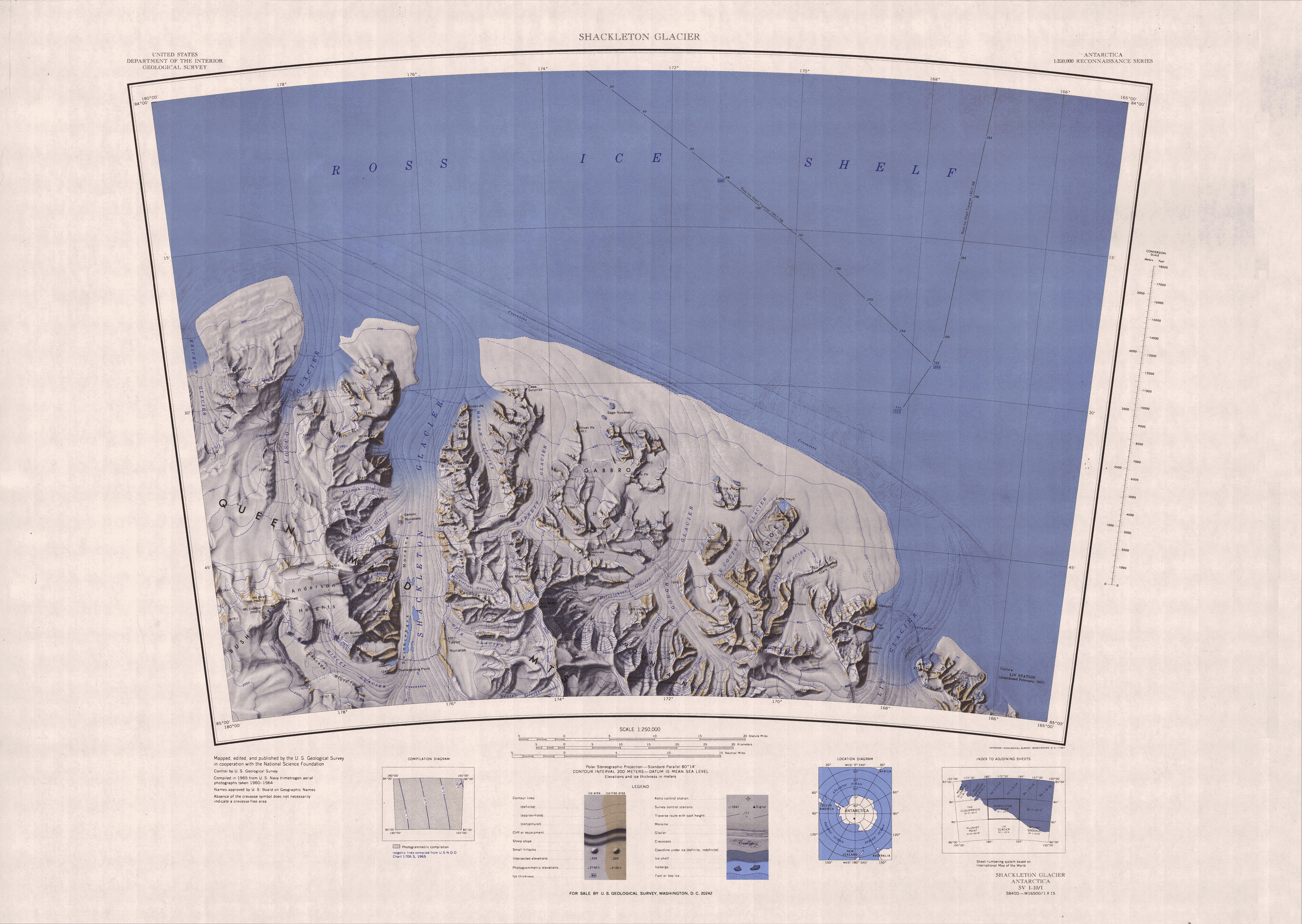
Erb Range to the west of the map

Features, from north to south, include:

=== Mount Speed ===
84°30′S 176°50′W. A roughly circular, mound-shaped mountain with several low summits at the edge of Ross Ice Shelf, standing at the west side of the mouth of Shackleton Glacier. Discovered by the United States Antarctic Service Expedition (USAS) (1939–41), and surveyed by Albert P. Crary, leader of the United States Ross Ice Shelf Traverse (1957–58). Named by Crary for Lieutenant Harvey G. Speed, United States Navy, Squadron VX-6, who wintered at Little America V in 1957.

=== Oppegaard Spur ===
84°29′S 177°22′W. A narrow rock spur, 2 nautical miles (3.7 km; 2.3 mi) long, extending northwest from the southwest portion of Mount Speed, standing just east of Kosco Glacier where the latter enters Ross Ice Shelf. Discovered and photographed by the United States Antarctic Service, 1939–41. Named by United States Advisory Committee on Antarctic Names (US-ACAN) for Richard D. Oppegaard, Seaman Apprentice, United States Navy, a member of the United States Naval Support Force, Antarctica, who lost his life in a shipboard accident, Nov. 8, 1957.

=== McGinnis Peak ===
84°32′S 177°52′W. A prominent peak 1,270 metres (4,170 ft) high, with a large, bare cirque in the north slope, standing near the edge of the Ross Ice Shelf, just E of the lower part of Kosco Glacier and 3.5 nautical miles (6.5 km; 4.0 mi) SW of Oppegaard Spur. Discovered by the USAS, 1939-41. Surveyed by A.P. Crary in 1957-58, and named by him for Lyle McGinnis, seismologist with the United States Victoria Land Traverse Party in 1958-59.

=== Mount Wasko ===
84°34′S 176°58′W. A double-peaked, saddle-shaped mountain 1,170 metres (3,840 ft) high, on the west side of Shackleton Glacier, 3 nautical miles (5.6 km; 3.5 mi) north of Mount Franke. Discovered by the USAS (1939–41), and surveyed by A.P. Crary (1957–58). Named by Crary for Lt. Cdr. Frank Wasko, USNR, of Squadron VX-6 at Little America V in 1957-58.

=== Mount Franke ===
84°37′S 177°04′W. A prominent mountain (1,600 metres (5,200 ft)), with much rock exposed on its north side, standing between Mount Wasko and Mount Cole along the west side of Shackleton Glacier, Discovered and photographed by the USAS, 1939–41. Surveyed by A.P. Crary in 1957-58 and named by him for Lt. Cdr. Willard J. Franke, USN, of USN Squadron VX-6, who wintered at Little America V, 1958.

=== Mount Cole ===
84°40′S 177°08′W. A mountain over 1,400 metres (4,600 ft) high on the west side of Shackleton Glacier, between the mouths of Forman and Gerasimou Glaciers. Discovered and photographed by United States Navy Operation Highjump, 1946-47. Named by US-ACAN for Nelson R. Cole, Aviation Machinist's Mate with USN Squadron VX-6, who lost his life in a helicopter crash in the McMurdo Sound area in July 1957.

=== Epidote Peak ===
84°46′S 176°56′W. A prominent rock peak just north of the mouth of Held Glacier, overlooking the west side of Shackleton Glacier. So named by the Texas Tech Shackleton Glacier Party (1964-65) because of the abundance of the mineral epidote which gives the peak a spotted appearance.

=== Mount Greenlee ===
84°51′S 177°00′W. A steep-sided, jagged mountain (2,030 m) of metamorphic rock which overlooks the west side of Shackleton Glacier just east of Mount Butters. Named by F. Alton Wade, leader of the Texas Tech Shackleton Glacier Party (1962-63), for David W. Greenlee, a member of the party.

=== Thanksgiving Point ===
84°56′S 177°00′W. A conspicuous rock nunatak at the west side of Shackleton Glacier, just north of the mouth of Mincey Glacier. So named by the Texas Tech Shackleton Glacier Party (1962-63) because they reached this point on Thanksgiving Day, 1962.

=== Mount Butters ===
84°53′S 177°28′W. The snowcapped summit, 2,440 metres (8,010 ft) high, of a buttress-type escarpment at the extreme southeast end of Anderson Heights, between Mincey Glacier on the south and Shackleton Glacier on the east. Discovered and photographed by United States Navy Operation Highjump (1946-47) on the flights of Feb. 16, 1947, and named by US-ACAN for Capt. Raymond J. Butters, USMC, navigator of Flight 8A.

=== Anderson Heights ===
84°49′S 178°15′W. A roughly rectangular snow-covered tableland, 7 nautical miles (13 km; 8.1 mi) long and 6 nautical miles (11 km; 6.9 mi) wide, with an elevation somewhat over 2,400 metres (7,900 ft) high, located between Mount Bennett and Mount Butters in the east part of the Bush Mountains. Discovered and photographed by United States Navy Operation Highjump (1946-47) on the flights of Feb. 16, 1947, and named by US-ACAN for Lt. George H. Anderson, United States Navy, pilot of Flight 8 of that date from Little America to the South Pole and return.

== Sources ==
- Alberts, Fred G., ed. (1995), Geographic Names of the Antarctic (PDF) (2 ed.), United States Board on Geographic Names This article incorporates public domain material from websites or documents of the United States Board on Geographic Names.
- "Erb Range", Geographic Names Information System, United States Geological Survey, United States Department of the Interior
- Shackleton Glacier, USGS
- This article incorporates public domain material from websites or documents of the United States Geological Survey.
