= Kosco Glacier =

Glacier in Antarctica

- Location within Antarctica
- Coordinates: 84°27′S 178°0′W
- Terminus: Ross Ice Shelf

Kosco Glacier (84°27′S 178°0′W) is a glacier about 20 nautical miles (37 km; 23 mi) long, flowing from the Anderson Heights vicinity of the Bush Mountains of Antarctica northward to enter the Ross Ice Shelf between Wilson Portal and Mount Speed.

== Discovery and naming ==
The Kosco Glacier was discovered by the United States Antarctic Service, 1939–41, and was named by the Advisory Committee on Antarctic Names for Captain George F. Kosco, U.S. Navy, chief aerologist and chief scientist of U.S. Navy Operation Highjump, 1946–47.

== Features ==
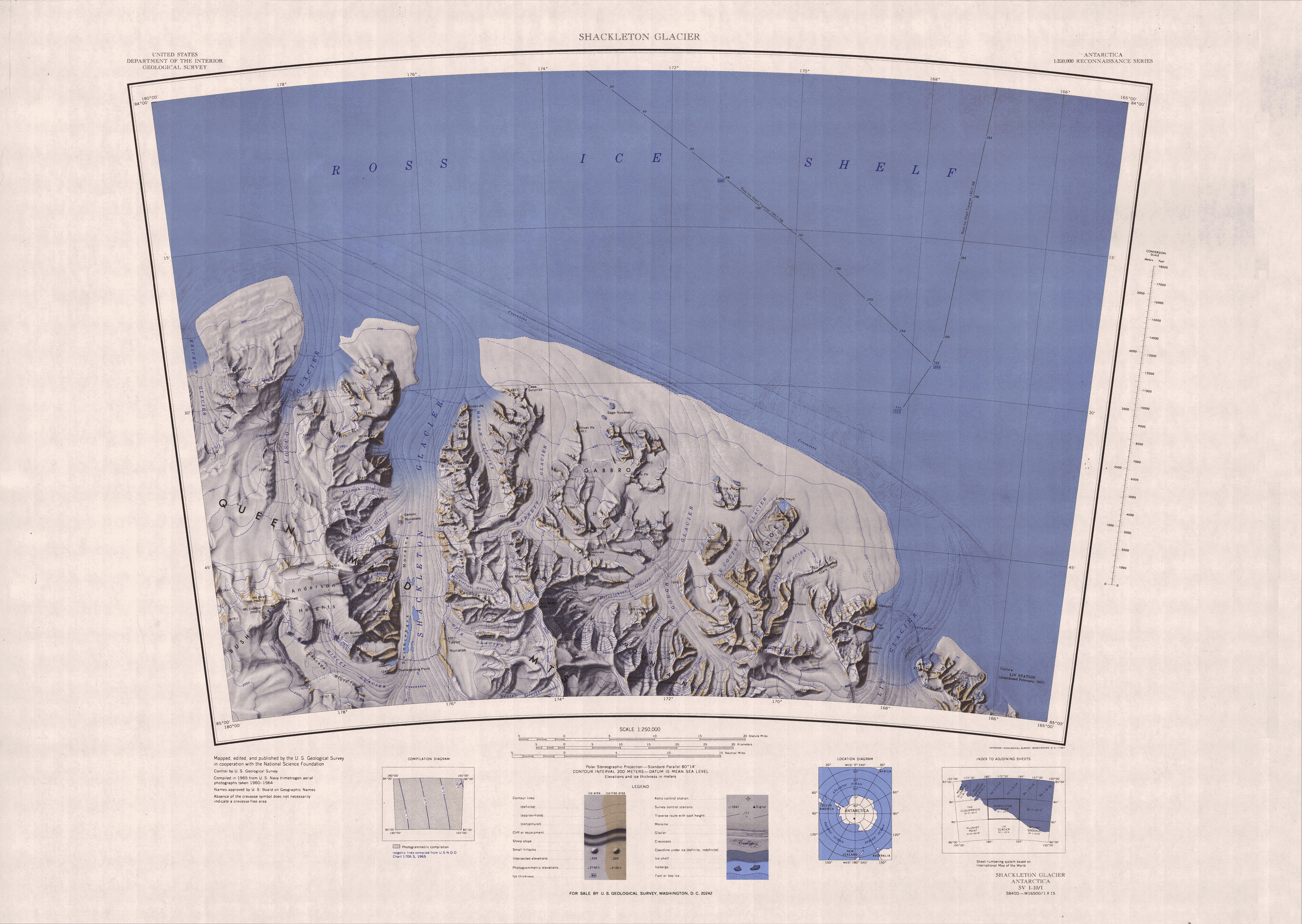
Kosco Glacier in west of map, entering Ross Ice Shelf

The Kosko Glacier forms to the north of Anderson Heights and flows north. It passes McGinnis Peak to its east and then Wilson Portal to its west before entering the Ross Ice Shelf.

=== Pallid Peak ===
84°37′S 178°49′W. A small peak 1,500 metres (4,900 ft) high along the west side of Kosco Glacier, 7 miles (11 km) southwest of McGinnis Peak. The descriptive name was proposed by Edmund Stump of the USARP Ohio State University party which geologically mapped the peak on December 3, 1970. Composed entirely of white crystalline marble, the Peak lacks contrast with the snow that skirts it to a high level.

=== Wilson Portal ===
84°28′S 178°54′W. A coastal mountain rising over 1,000 metres (3,300 ft) high, which is snow covered except for its north steep rock face. Spurs descend northeast from the feature. It stands 2.5 nautical miles (4.6 km; 2.9 mi) southeast of O'Leary Peak and overlooks the west side of the mouth (or portal) of Kosko Glacier where the latter enters Ross Ice Shelf. Discovered and photographed by USAS (1939–41) and surveyed by A.P. Crary (1957-58). Named by Crary for Charles R. Wilson, chief aurora scientist at Little America V (1958) and glaciologist of the U.S. Victoria Land Traverse Party (1958-59).

== Sources ==
- Alberts, Fred G., ed. (1995), Geographic Names of the Antarctic (PDF) (2 ed.), United States Board on Geographic Names This article incorporates public domain material from websites or documents of the United States Board on Geographic Names.
- Shackleton Glacier, USGS: United States Geological Survey
- This article incorporates public domain material from websites or documents of the United States Geological Survey.
