= Roberts Massif =

Mountain in Ross Dependency, Antarctica

- Location within Antarctica

Geography
- Continent: Antarctica
- Region: Ross Dependency
- Range coordinates: 85°32′S 177°5′W

Roberts Massif (85°32′S 177°5′W) is a remarkable snow-free massif at the head of Shackleton Glacier. It rises to over 2,700 metres (8,900 ft) and is about 60 square nautical miles (210 km^{2}; 79 sq mi) in area.

== Discovery and naming ==
Roberts Massif was visited by the Southern Party of the New Zealand Geological Survey Antarctic Expedition (NZGSAE) (1961–62), who named it for Athol Renouf Roberts (1911–1981), leader at Scott Base for 1961–62.

== Location ==
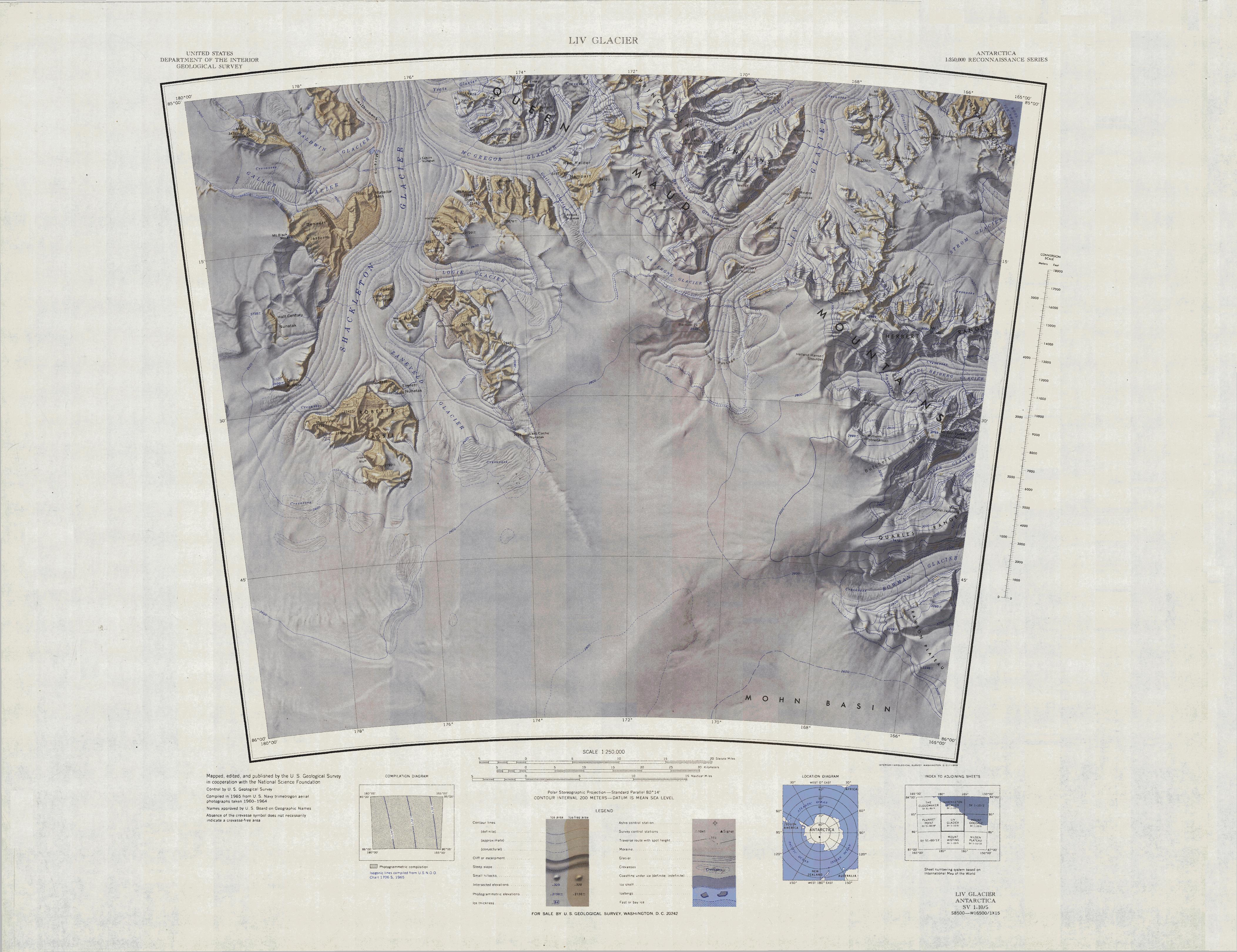
Roberts Massif in west center of map

Roberts Massif is to the south of the point where the Zaneveld Glacier converges from the east with the Shackleton Glacier from the west, opposite Dismal Buttress and Half Century Nunatak on the northwest side of the Shackleton Glacier. The Cumulus Hills are to the northeast, across Zaneveld Glacier. Features, from south to north, include Fluted Peak, Grass Bluff, Misery Peak and Everett Nunatak.

== Features ==
=== Fluted Peak ===
85°37′S 176°40′W. A fluted snow peak rising at the southeast extremity of Roberts Massif. The only snow peak on the massif, it is visible for many miles to the south as a distinctive landmark. Surveyed and named by the Southern Party of the NZGSAE (1961–62) because of its appearance.

=== Grass Bluff ===
85°35′S 177°14′W. A wedge-shaped rock bluff 4 nautical miles (7.4 km; 4.6 mi) northwest of Fluted Peak, in the southern part of Roberts Massif. Named by the United States Advisory Committee on Antarctic Names (US-ACAN) for Robert D. Grass, United States Antarctic Research Program (USARP) meteorologist at South Pole Station, winter 1964.

=== Fernette Peak ===
85°35′S 176°58′W. A peak (2,700 m) that rises above the south-central part of Roberts Massif in the Queen Maud Mountains. Mapped by the United States Geological Survey (USGS) from surveys and United States Navy air photos, 1960-65. Named by US-ACAN for Gregory L. Fernette, USARP field assistant in Antarctica during the 1968-69 season.

=== Munizaga Peak ===
85°32′S 177°37′W. An ice-free peak, 2,590 metres (8,500 ft) high, located 3 nautical miles (5.6 km; 3.5 mi) east-southeast of Misery Peak in the Roberts Massif. Mapped by the USGS from surveys and U.S. Navy air photos, 1960-65. Named by the US-ACAN for Fernando S. Munizaga, Chilean geologist who participated in the USARP Ellsworth Land Survey, 1968-69, and accompanied the Texas Technological College geological party in a survey of Roberts Massif in the same season.

=== Misery Peak ===
85°31′S 178°16′W. A peak, 2,725 metres (8,940 ft) high, at the extreme west side of Roberts Massif, occupied as a survey station. So named by the Southern Party of the NZGSAE (1961-62) to describe the many miserable hours spent here while waiting for clouds to disperse.

=== Everett Nunatak ===
85°28′S 176°40′W. A massive rock nunatak standing just northeast of Roberts Massif, at the southwest side of Zaneveld Glacier. Named by the Texas Tech Shackleton Glacier Expedition (1964-65) for James R. Everett, graduate student at Texas Technological College, a member of the expedition who first explored the feature.

== Nearby features ==
=== Dismal Buttress ===
85°27′S 178°42′W. A mainly ice-free rock bluff, overlooking the west side of the head of Shackleton Glacier about 3 nautical miles (5.6 km; 3.5 mi) NW of Roberts Massif. So named because of several depressing incidents experienced here by the Southern Party of the NZGSAE (1961-62), including the loss of Dismal, the party's only lead dog, which had to be destroyed.

=== Half Century Nunatak ===
85°22′S 178°50′W. A prominent nunatak, displaying a high east-facing rock escarpment, located 4 nautical miles (7.4 km; 4.6 mi) north of Dismal Buttress at the west side of upper Shackleton Glacier. Named by the Southern Party of the NZGSAE (1961-62) which, near this nunatak, celebrated the 50th anniversary of Amundsen reaching the South Pole.

== Sources ==
- Alberts, Fred G., ed. (1995), Geographic Names of the Antarctic (PDF) (2 ed.), United States Board on Geographic Names This article incorporates public domain material from websites or documents of the United States Board on Geographic Names.
- Liv Glacier, USGS: United States Geological Survey

This article incorporates public domain material from websites or documents of the United States Geological Survey.
