= Mount Finley =

Mountain in Ross Dependency, Antarctica

- Location within Antarctica

Geography
- Continent: Antarctica
- Range coordinates: 85°01′S 173°58′W
- Parent range: Queen Maud Mountains

Mount Finley (85°01′S 173°58′W) is a prominent mountain, 3,470 metres (11,380 ft) high, on the ridge which extends south from Mount Wade, located 5 miles (8.0 km) south-southwest of Mount Oliver in the Queen Maud Mountains. Mount Finley was named by Rear Admiral Byrd for John H. Finley, President of the American Geographical Society at the time of the Byrd Antarctic Expedition 1928-30.

== Nearby features ==
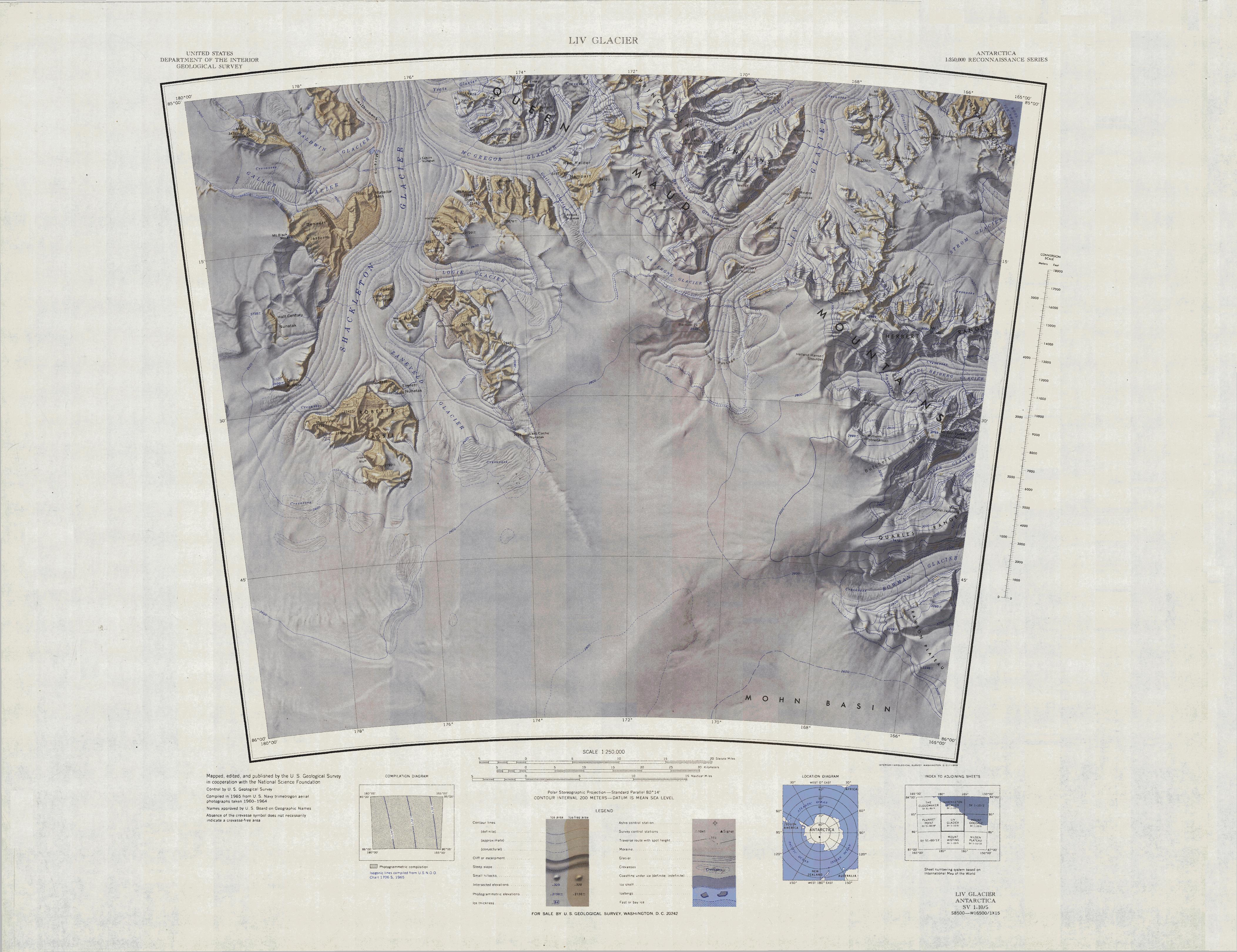
Mount Finley in north center of map

Mount Finley is in the northeast of a massif that is bounded by the Yeats Glacier to the north and the McGregor Glacier to the south, both tributaries of the Shackleton Glacier to the west. Other features of the massif, from west to east, are Lockhart Ridge, Pendant Ridge, Simplicity Hill, Crilly Hill, Keel Hill and Bynam Peak.

=== Lockhart Ridge ===
85°02′S 174°50′W. A conspicuous ridge about 4 nautical miles (7.4 km; 4.6 mi) long, extending west along the south side of Yeats Glacier and terminating at Shackleton Glacier. Named by the Texas Tech Shackleton Glacier Expedition (1964-65) for CWO James J. Lockhart, pilot with the U.S. Army Aviation Detachment which supported the expedition.

=== Pendant Ridge ===
85°04′S 174°45′W. A ridge about 3 nautical miles (5.6 km; 3.5 mi) long, extending southwest to the north side of the mouth of McGregor Glacier, 1.5 nautical miles (2.8 km; 1.7 mi) northwest of Simplicity Hill. So named by the Texas Tech Shackleton Glacier Expedition (1964 65) because a pyramidal peak at its southern extremity appears to be dangling from the ridge as a pendant.

=== Simplicity Hill ===
85°06′S 174°38′W. A small ice-free hill rising 1 nautical mile (1.9 km; 1.2 mi) west of Crilly Hill, at the north side of McGregor Glacier. So named by the Texas Tech Shackleton Glacier Expedition (1964-65) because of the ease with which they were able to approach the feature, and because of the relative simplicity of its geologic nature.

=== Crilly Hill ===
85°06′S 174°29′W. The central of three ice-free hills at the north side of McGregor Glacier, 6 nautical miles (11 km; 6.9 mi) south-southwest of Mount Finley. Named by the Texas Tech Shackleton Glacier Expedition (1964-65) for Specialist 6th Class Clifford L. Crilly, medic with the U.S. Army Aviation Detachment which supported the expedition.

=== Keel Hill ===
85°06′S 174°13′W. A small ice-free hill, standing at the north side of McGregor Glacier, about 1.5 nautical miles (2.8 km; 1.7 mi) east of Crilly Hill, in the Queen Maud Mountains. Named by the Texas Tech Shackleton Glacier Expedition (1964-65) for Specialist 5th Class Elbert E. Keel, member of the U.S. Army Aviation Detachment which supported the expedition.

=== Bynum Peak ===
85°03′S 173°41′W. A rock peak 3 nautical miles (5.6 km; 3.5 mi) southeast of Mount Finley, overlooking the north side of McGregor Glacier in the Queen Maud Mountains. Named by US-ACAN for Gaither D. Bynum, USARP satellite geodesist at McMurdo Station, winter 1965.

== Sources ==
- Alberts, Fred G., ed. (1995), Geographic Names of the Antarctic (PDF) (2 ed.), United States Board on Geographic Names This article incorporates public domain material from websites or documents of the United States Board on Geographic Names.
- Liv Glacier, USGS: United States Geological Survey
- This article incorporates public domain material from websites or documents of the United States Geological Survey.
