= Bush Mountains =

Mountain group in Antarctica

- Location within Antarctica

Highest point
- Elevation: 3,580 m (11,750 ft)

Geography
- Continent: Antarctica
- Range coordinates: 84°57′S 179°30′E
- Parent range: Queen Maud Mountains

The Bush Mountains is a series of rugged elevations at the heads of the Ramsey and Kosco glaciers in Antarctica. The Bush Mountains extend from Mount Weir in the west to Anderson Heights overlooking Shackleton Glacier in the east.

== Exploration and naming ==
They were photographed at a distance by the Byrd Antarctic Expedition (Byrd AE) on several flights to the Queen Maud Mountains in November 1929. The mountains were further defined from aerial photographs taken by the USAS (1939–41), US Navy Operation Highjump (1946–47), and USN Operation Deep Freeze (1956–63). The Bush Mountains were named by the Advisory Committee on Antarctic Names (US-SCAN) on the recommendation of Rear Admiral Richard Evelyn Byrd, after James I. Bush, United States financier and patron of the Byrd AE, 1928–30.

== Location ==
The Bush Mountains are at the head of the Ramsey Glacier and its tributary the Bowin Glacier. Features, from west to east, include Fulgham Ridge, Mount Weir, McIntyre Promontory, Mount Cromie, Mount Boyd and Mount Bennett. The mountains terminate at Anderson Heights and Cascade Bluff to the east, at the head of Kosco Glacier and Mincey Glacier.

== Features ==
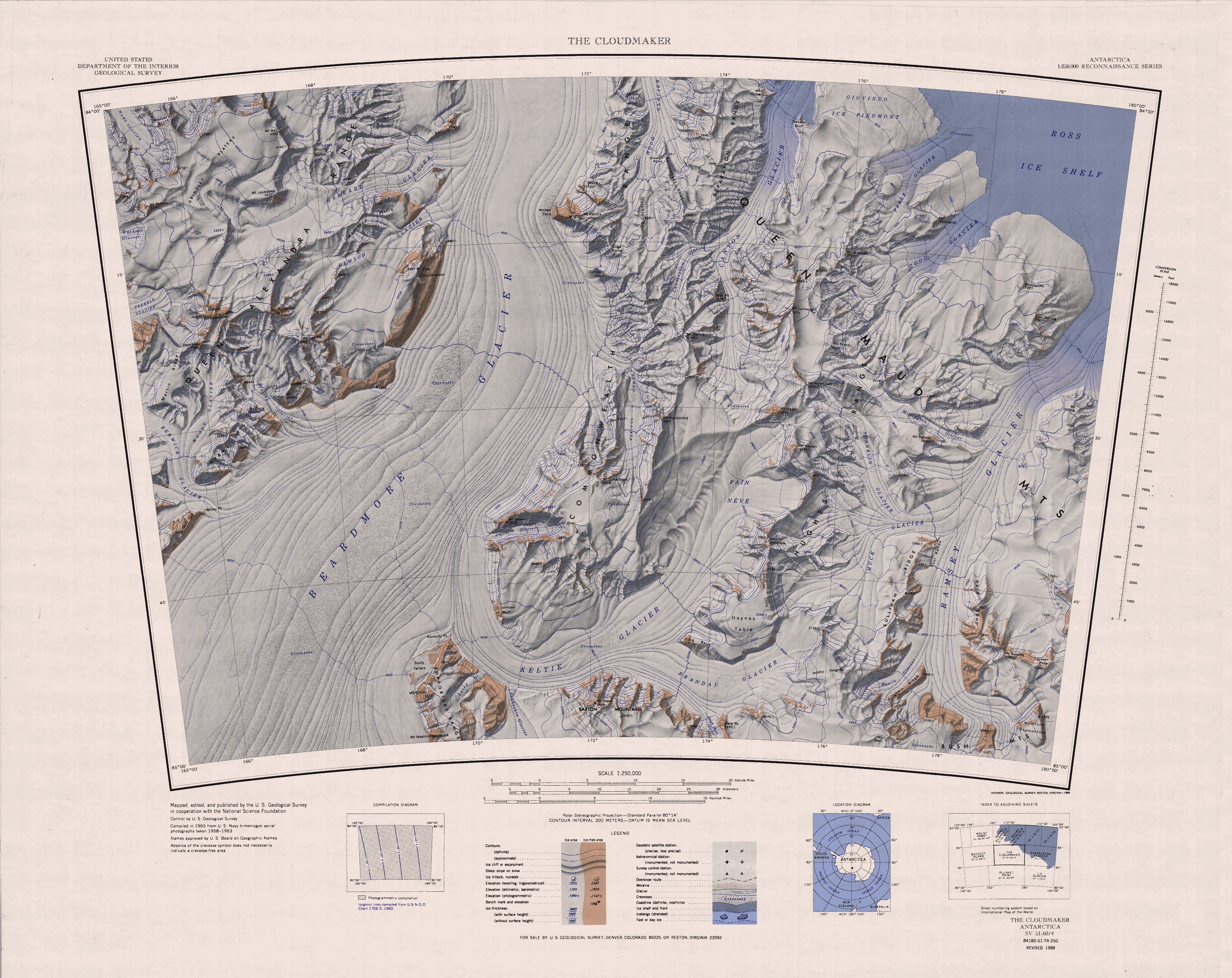
Bush Mountains to the southeast of the map

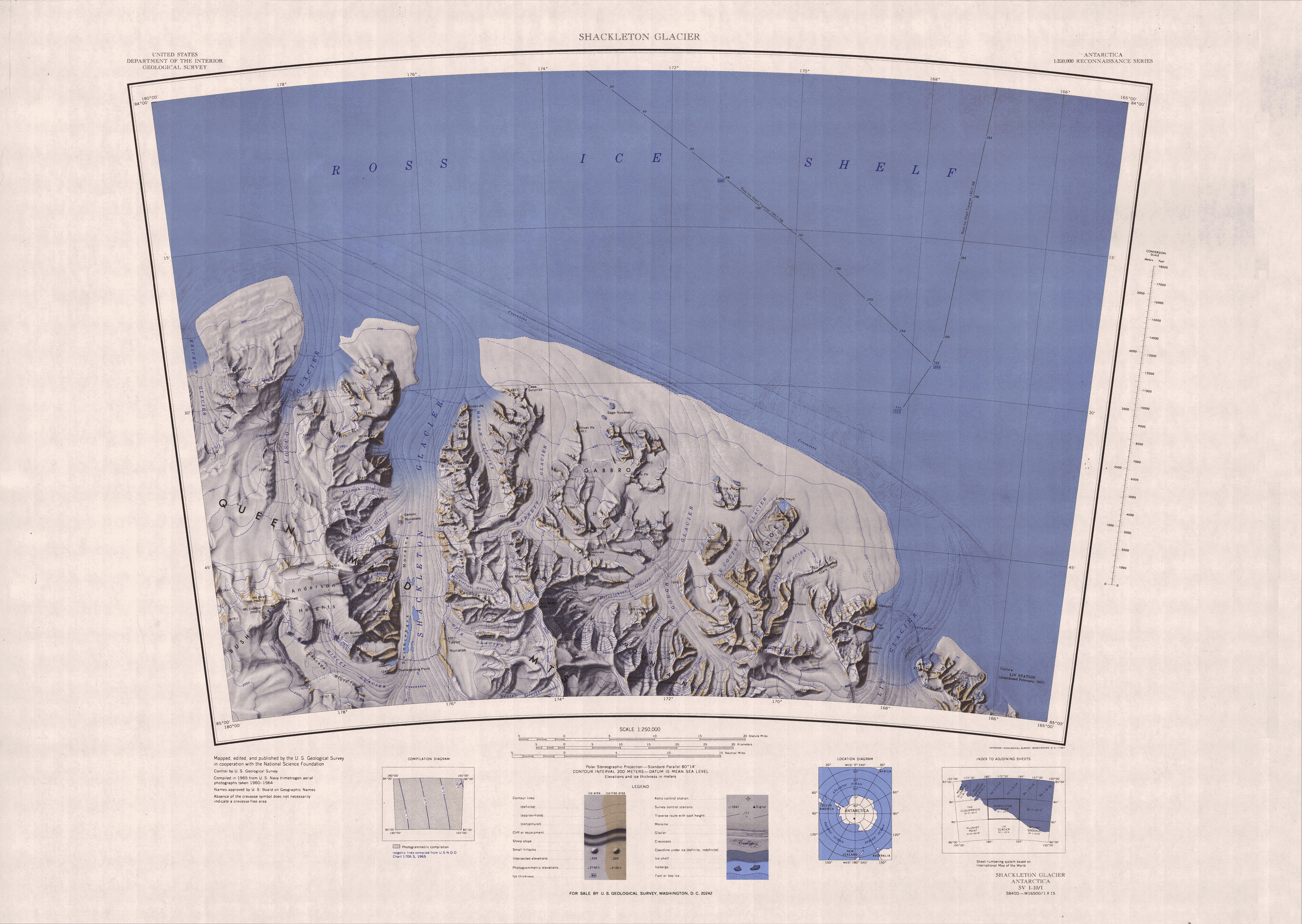
Bush Mountains to the southwest of the map

Geographical features and nearby features include:

=== Mount Weir ===
84°59′S 177°10′E. A steep section of the polar plateau escarpment with almost all of the rock exposed facing northeast, standing just south of the base of Fulgham Ridge at the head of Ramsey Glacier. Discovered and photographed by United States Navy Operation Highjump on Flight 8A of Feb. 16, 1947, and named by United States [[Advisory Committee on Antarctic Names]] (US-ACAN) for Maj. Robert R. Weir, United States Marine Corps, pilot of this flight.

=== Mount Cromie ===
84°50′S 179°14′W. A snow-covered mountain, 2,950 metres (9,680 ft) high, rising 1.5 nautical miles (2.8 km; 1.7 mi) southeast of Mount Boyd in the Bush Mountains. Discovered and photographed by the United States Antarctic Service, 1939-41. Surveyed by A.P. Crary, leader of the United States Ross Ice Shelf Traverse Party (1957-58), and named by him for William Cromie, assistant glaciologist with the party.

=== Mount Boyd ===
84°48′S 179°24′W. A pyramidal mountain, 2,960 metres (9,710 ft) high, standing 3 nautical miles (5.6 km; 3.5 mi) west of Mount Bennett, in the Bush Mountains. Discovered and photographed by the United States Antarctic Service, 1939-41. Surveyed by A.P. Crary, leader of the United States Ross Ice Shelf Traverse Party (1957-58), and named by him for Walter Boyd, Jr., glaciologist with the party.

=== Mount Bennett ===
84°49′S 178°55′W. A prominent mountain, 3,090 metres (10,140 ft) high, about 3 nautical miles (5.6 km; 3.5 mi) east of Mount Boyd, surmounting the west part of Anderson Heights, Queen Maud Mountains. Discovered by the United States Antarctic Service (1939-41), and surveyed by the United States Ross Ice Shelf Traverse Party (1957-58) led by A.P. Crary. Named by Crary for Hugh Bennett, seismologist with the party.

=== Cascade Bluff ===
84°57′S 178°10′W. A low, mainly ice-covered bluff that forms the southwest wall of Mincey Glacier in the Queen Maud Mountains. The feature was so named by the Texas Tech-Shackleton Glacier Party, 1962-63, because water cascades over the bluff during warm periods.

== Sources ==
- Alberts, Fred G., ed. (1995), Geographic Names of the Antarctic (PDF) (2 ed.), United States Board on Geographic Names This article incorporates public domain material from websites or documents of the United States Board on Geographic Names.
- The Cloudmaker, USGS
- Shackleton Glacier, USGS
- This article incorporates public domain material from websites or documents of the United States Geological Survey.
