= Bennett Platform =

Mesa on Shackleton Glacier, Antarctica

- Location within Antarctica

Geography
- Continent: Antarctica
- Region: Ross Dependency
- Range coordinates: 85°13′S 177°50′W

Bennett Platform (85°13′S 177°50′W) is a high, nearly flat, snow-free mesa of dark rock of Antarctica, about 5 nautical miles (9.3 km; 5.8 mi) long and 2.5 nautical miles (4.6 km; 2.9 mi) wide, located immediately east of Mount Black, on the west side of Shackleton Glacier.

== Discovery and naming ==
Bennett Platform was discovered and photographed by U.S. Navy Operation Highjump (1946–47), on the flights of February 16, 1947, and named by the United States Advisory Committee on Antarctic Names (US-ACAN) for Floyd Bennett, copilot on the Byrd North Pole Flight of May 1926.

== Location ==
Bennett Platform is on the west side of Shackleton Glacier opposite the point where Logie Glacier joins it from the east through a gap in the Cumulus Hills. Gallup Glacier runs along its north side. Features include Mount Black in the west and Matador Mountain in the east. Nearby features include Mount Rosenwald to the northwest, Mount Heekin to the north and Half Century Nunatak to the south.

== Features and nearby features ==
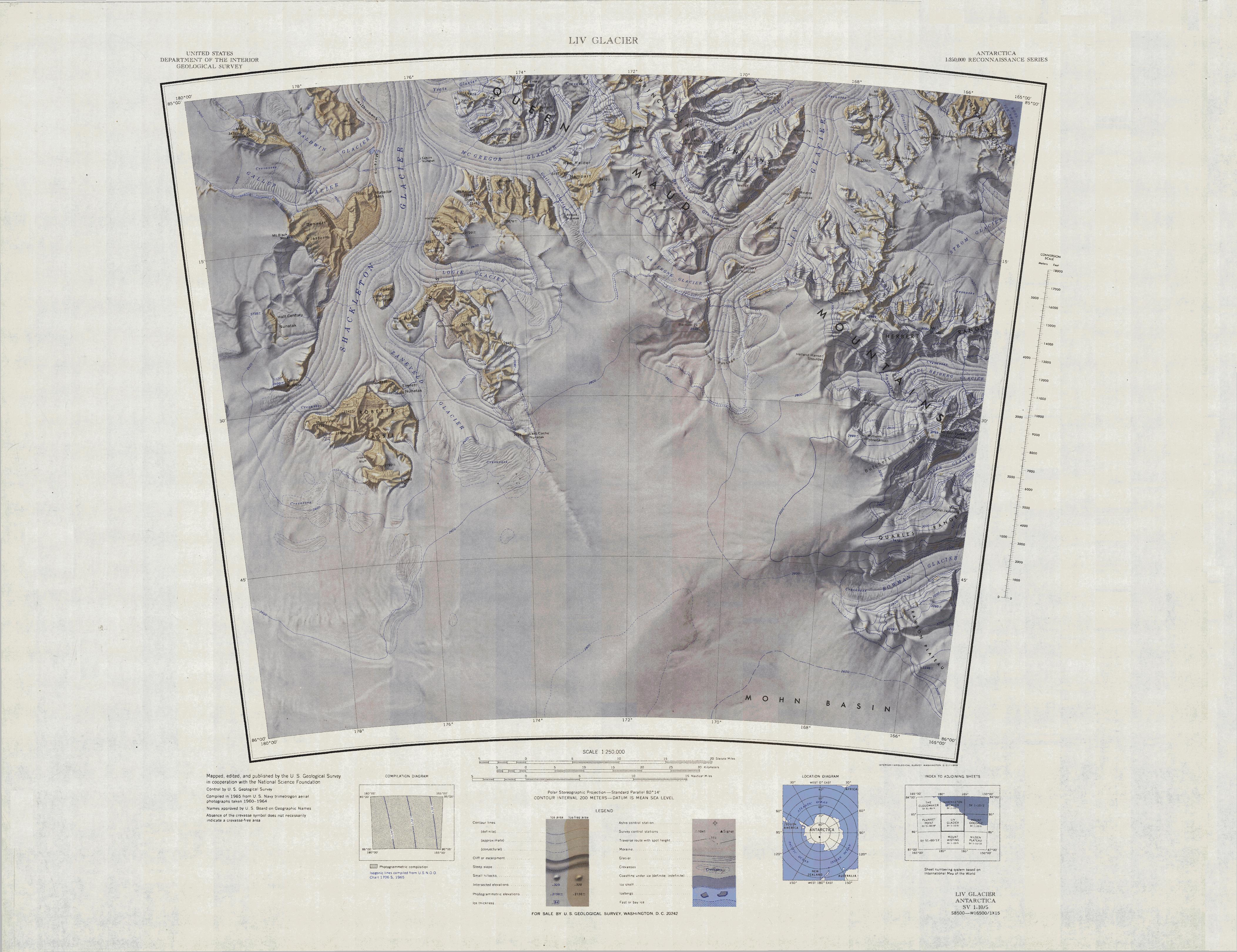
Bennett Platform in northwest of map

=== Mount Black ===
85°14′S 178°22′W. A prominent mountain, 3,005 metres (9,859 ft) high, with a gentle snow-covered slope on its southwest side and a steep rock face on its northwest side, forming a part of the polar escarpment just west of Bennett Platform and the upper reaches of Shackleton Glacier. Discovered and photographed by Rear Admiral Richard E. Byrd on his return flight from the South Pole in November 1929, and named by him for Van Lear Black, American financier and contributor to ByrdAE of 1928-30 and 1933-35.

=== Kitching Ridge ===
85°12′S 177°06′W. A prominent rock ridge on the west side of Shackleton Glacier, between Bennett Platform and Matador Mountain. Named by US-ACAN for South African vertebrate paleontologist James W. Kitching who first found fossils here. Kitching was an exchange scientist with the Ohio State University Institute of Polar Studies 1970-71 geological party to the Queen Maud Mountains.

=== Matador Mountain ===
85°10′S 176°50′W. A prominent, ice-free mountain, 1,950 metres (6,400 ft) high, standing at the south side of the mouth of Gallup Glacier where the latter enters Shackleton Glacier. Named by F. Alton Wade, leader of the Texas Tech Shackleton Glacier Expedition (1962-63) because all three members of the party were affiliated with this college. "Matador" is the general name for the student body at Texas Technological College.

=== Mount Rosenwald ===
85°04′S 179°06′W. A spectacular mountain, 3,450 metres (11,320 ft) high, which forms a distinctive landmark between the heads of Gallup and Baldwin Glaciers. The mountain is entirely snow covered on the southwest side but has nearly vertical exposed-rock cliffs on the northeast side. Discovered and photographed by Rear Admiral Richard E. Byrd on the South Pole Flight of November 1929. Named by Byrd for Julius Rosenwald of Chicago, a contributor to the ByrdAE of 1928-30 and 1933-35.

=== McDonough Nunataks ===
85°08′S 179°59′E. Small group of isolated rock nunataks at the south margin of the Queen Maud Mountains, rising above the ice plateau 5 nautical miles (9.3 km; 5.8 mi) west of Mount Rosenwald. Named by US-ACAN for John W. McDonough, USARP ionospheric physicist at the South Pole Station, 1962.

=== Mount Heekin ===
85°03′S 177°16′W. A large, ice-free mountain overlooking the north side of the mouth of Baldwin Glacier where the latter enters Shackleton Glacier. Discovered and photographed by USN OpHjp (1946-47) on the flights of February 16, 1947, and named by US-ACAN for Lt. (j-g-) Robert P. Heekin, USN, navigator of Flight 8.

== Sources ==
- Alberts, Fred G., ed. (1995), Geographic Names of the Antarctic (PDF) (2 ed.), United States Board on Geographic Names This article incorporates public domain material from websites or documents of the United States Board on Geographic Names.
- Liv Glacier, USGS: United States Geological Survey

This article incorporates public domain material from websites or documents of the United States Geological Survey.
