= Shackleton Glacier =

Glacier in Antarctica

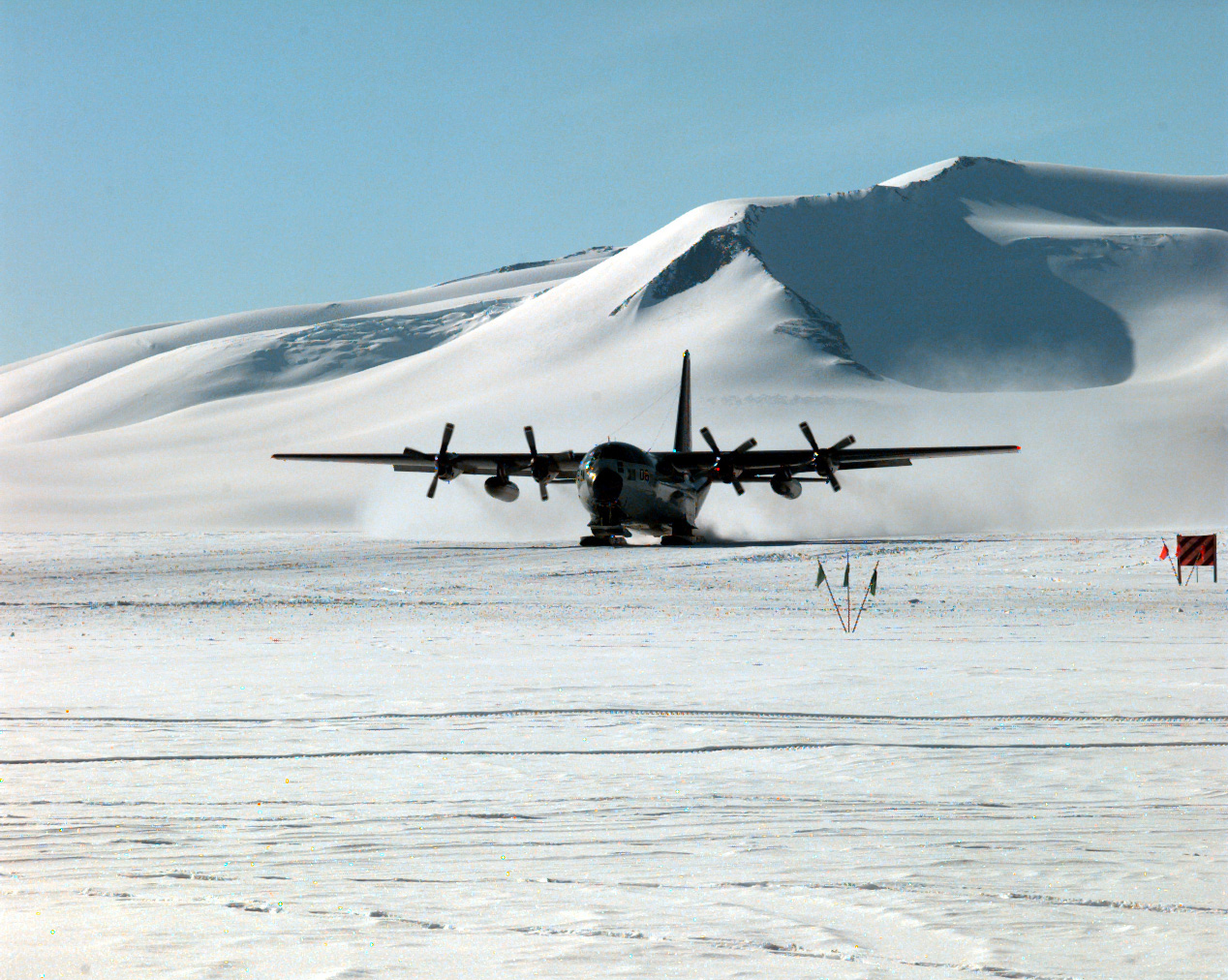
- U.S. Navy Lockheed LC-130 prepares to take off from Shackleton Glacier, Jan. 22, 1996.

- Location within Antarctica
- Coordinates: 84°35′S 176°20′W
- Terminus: Ross Ice Shelf

Shackleton Glacier (84°35′S 176°20′W) is a major Antarctic glacier, over 60 nautical miles (110 km; 69 mi) long and from 5 to 10 nautical miles (9.3 to 18.5 km; 5.8 to 11.5 mi) wide, descending from the Antarctic Plateau from the vicinity of Roberts Massif and flowing north through the Queen Maud Mountains to enter the Ross Ice Shelf between Mount Speed and Waldron Spurs. Discovered by the United States Antarctic Service (USAS) (1939–41) and named by the Advisory Committee on Antarctic Names (US-ACAN) for Sir Ernest Shackleton, British Antarctic explorer.

== Course ==
The Shackleton Glacier originates in the East Antarctic Ice Sheet and flows northeast between Dismal Buttress to the northwest and Roberts Massif to the southeast. It is joined from the right (east) by Zaneveld Glacier, which also originates in the ice sheet. Further north it is joined from the right by the Logie Glacier, which flows west through the Cumulus Hills. Flowing north, the Shackleton Glacier is joined from the left (west) by the Gallup Glacier and the Baldwin Glacier and from the right (east) by McGregor Glacier just past Eckins Nunatak.

The Swithinbank Moraine extends north from Matador Mountain along the west side of the Shackleton Glacier to the Gemini Nunataks. It crosses the mouths of the Gallup, Baldwin, Mincey and Field glaciers, left tributaries of the Shackleton Glacier.

Past Lockhart Ridge the Shackleton Glacier is joined from the right by the Yeats Glacier. The glacier flows north through the Queen Maud Mountains, with the Anderson Heights to its west and the Cathedral Peaks to its east. Below the Gemini nunataks the Gerasimou Glacier and Forman Glacier enter from the west before the mouth of the Shackleton Glacier. From the right (east) the Shackleton Glacier is fed by the Dick Glacier and McCuistion Glacier. It is joined by the Massam Glacier at its mouth. The Barrett Glacier enters the Ross Ice Shelf just east of the Shackleton Glacier.

== Left tributaries ==
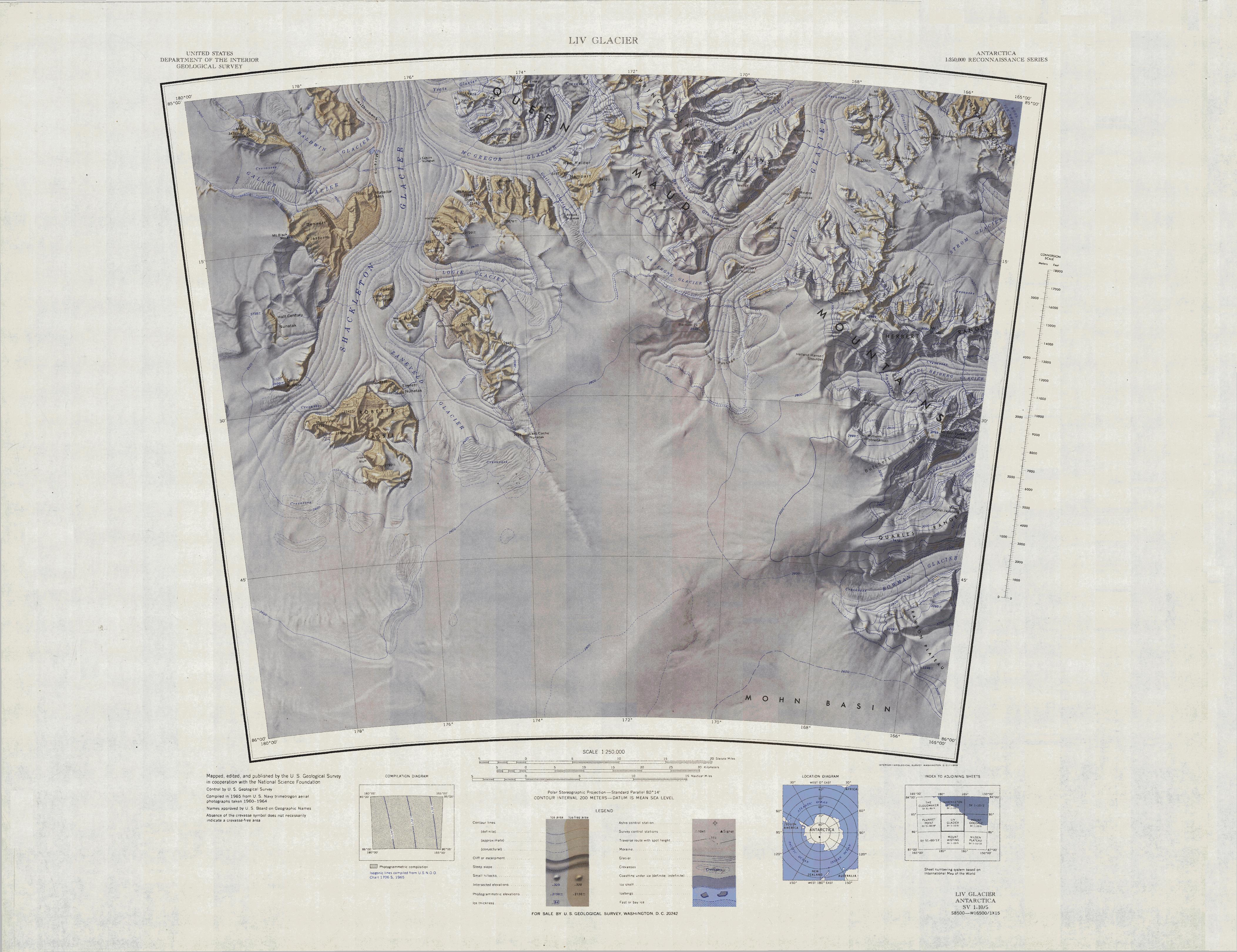
Upper course of the glacier (west of map)

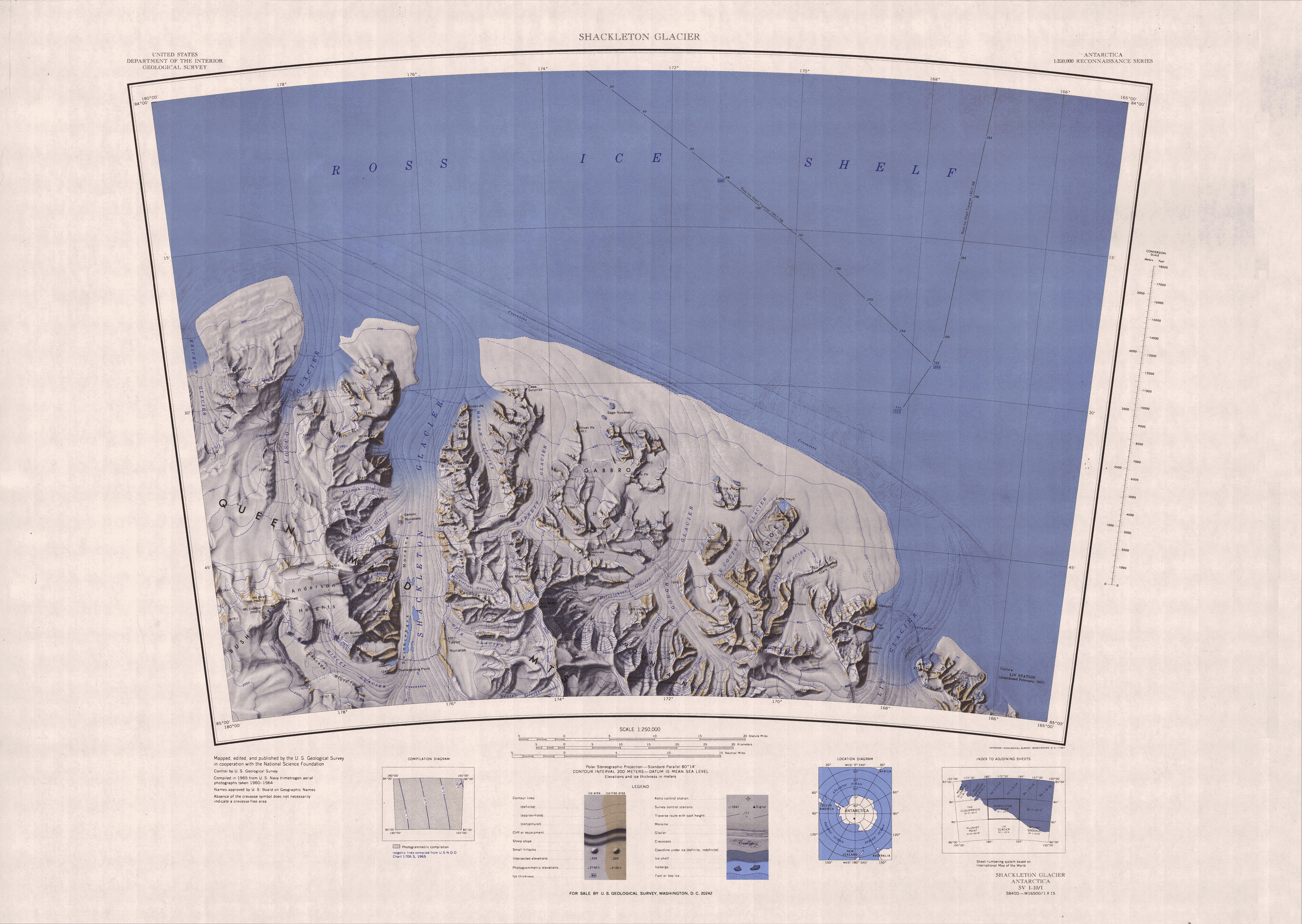
Lower course of the glacier (west of the map)

Tributaries from the left (west) of the glacier are:

=== Gallup Glacier ===
85°09′S 177°50′W. A broad glacier, about 12 nautical miles (22 km; 14 mi) long, flowing east between Mount Rosenwald and Mount Black to enter Shackleton Glacier just north of Matador Mountain. Named by US-ACAN after Commander F.S. Gallup, Jr., United States Navy. Commanding Officer of Squadron VX-6 during Operation Deep Freeze (OpDFrz) 1965.

=== Baldwin Glacier ===
85°06′S 177°10′W. A broad glacier, flowing generally eastward from a large icefalls at the escarpment west of Mount Rosenwald and entering Shackleton Glacier south of Mount Heekin. Discovered and photographed by United States Navy Operation Highjump (OpHjp) (1946–47) on the flights of Feb. 16, 1947. Named by US-ACAN for Sgt. George E. Baldwin, United States Marine Corps (USMC), photographer on Flight 8A.

=== Mincey Glacier ===
84°57′S 177°30′W. A glacier, 10 nautical miles (19 km; 12 mi) long, draining the south slopes of Anderson Heights in the Bush Mountains and flowing southeast to enter Shackleton Glacier at Thanksgiving Point. Discovered and photographed by USN OpHjp (1946–47) on the flights of Feb. 16, 1947. Named by US-ACAN for Master Sgt. A.V. Mincey, USMC, radio operator of Flight 8A.

=== Held Glacier ===
84°47′S 177°00′W. A tributary glacier, 3 nautical miles (5.6 km; 3.5 mi) long, flowing east from Anderson Heights to enter Shackleton Glacier just south of Epidote Peak. Named by US-ACAN for Lieutenant George B. Held, Civil Engineer Corps, USN, Public Works Officer at McMurdo Station during 1964.

=== Gerasimou Glacier ===
84°42′S 177°03′W. Steep-walled tributary glacier, 5 nautical miles (9.3 km; 5.8 mi) long, entering the west side of Shackleton Glacier opposite Gemini Nunataks. Named by the Texas Tech-Shackleton Glacier Party, 1964–65, for Helen Gerasimou, polar personnel specialist with the Office of Antarctic Programs, National Science Foundation.

=== Forman Glacier ===
84°39′S 177°10′W. A tributary glacier, 4 nautical miles (7.4 km; 4.6 mi) long, flowing east to enter Shackleton Glacier between Mount Franke and Mount Cole, in the Queen Maud Mountains. Named by US-ACAN after John H. Forman, Construction Mechanic, USN, a member of the McMurdo Station winter party, 1959.

== Right tributaries ==
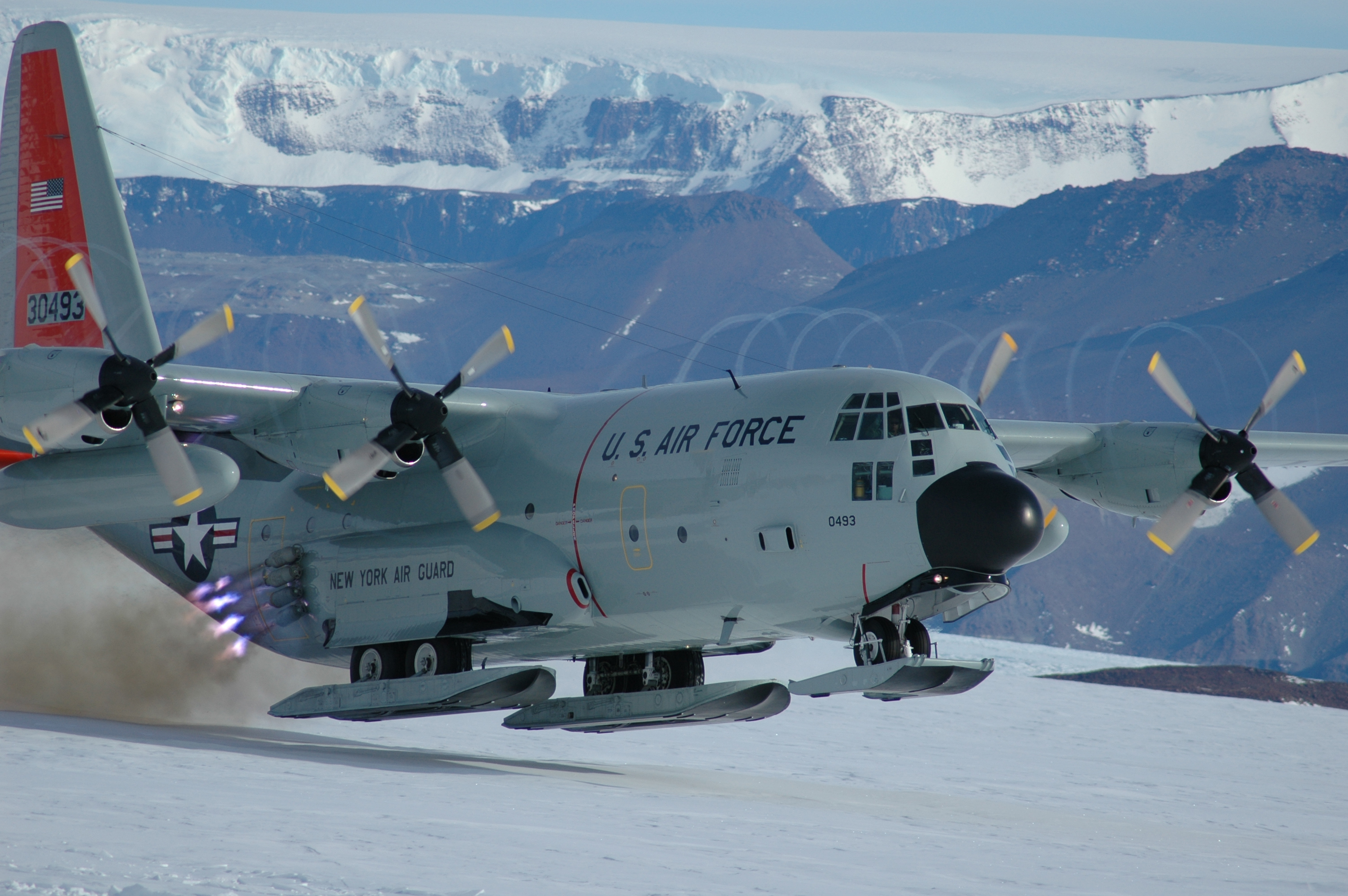
Lockheed LC-130 takes off from the Shackleton Glacier 25 November 2007

Tributaries from the right (east) of the glacier are:

=== Zaneveld Glacier ===
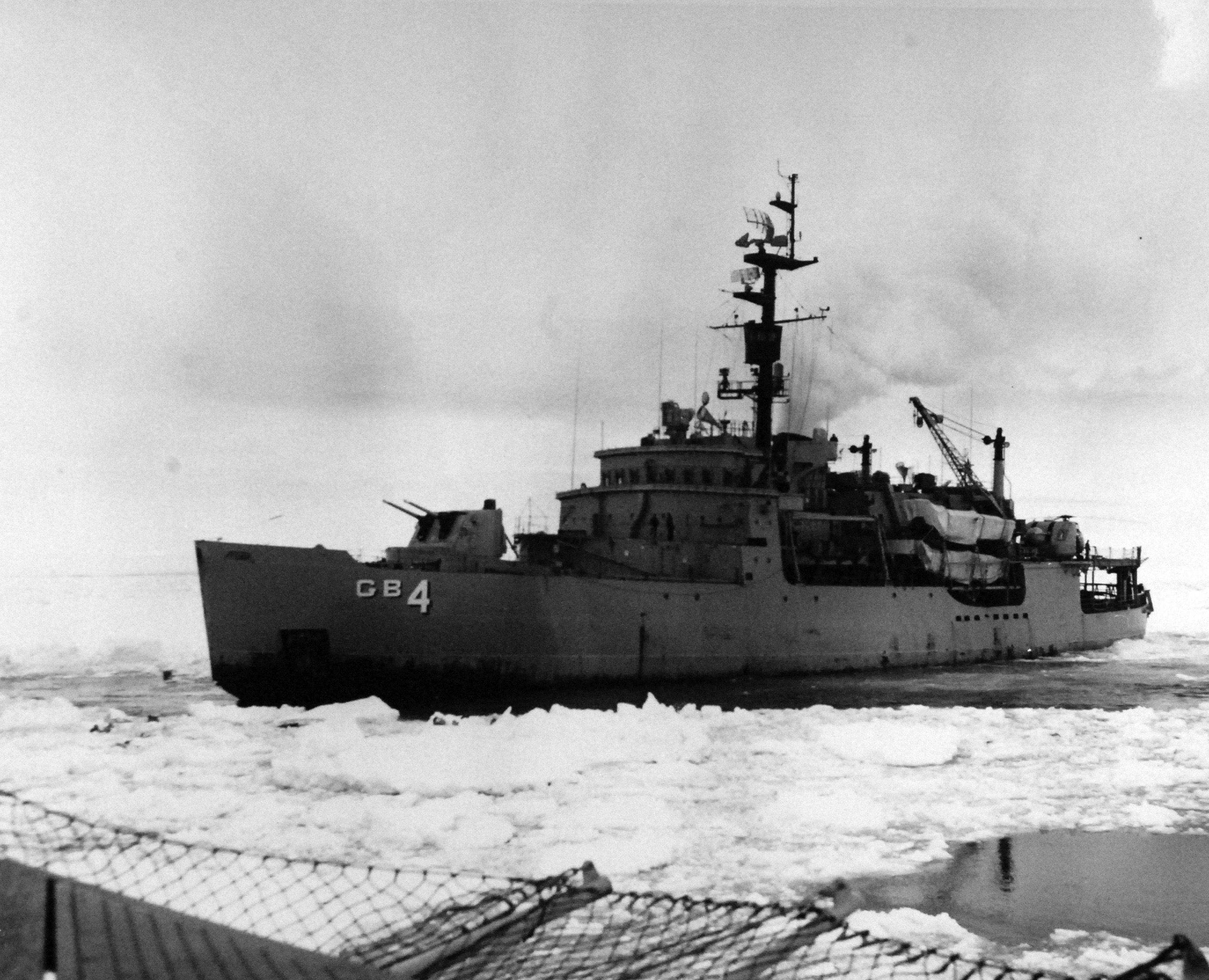
USS Glacier

85°26′S 176°25′W. A broad tributary glacier, flowing from the polar plateau northwest between Roberts Massif and Cumulus Hills to enter the upper part of Shackleton Glacier. Named by US-ACAN for Jacques S. Zaneveld, United States Antarctic Program (USARP) biologist at McMurdo Station, 1963–64 and 1964–65, who participated in the cruise of the USS Glacier, January-March 1965.

=== Logie Glacier ===
85°18′S 175°20′W. A tributary glacier, about 10 nautical miles (19 km; 12 mi) long and 2 nautical miles (3.7 km; 2.3 mi) wide, flowing west through the Cumulus Hills to enter Shackleton Glacier just northeast of Vickers Nunatak. Named by the Southern Party of the New Zealand Geological Survey Antarctic Expedition (NZGSAE) (1961–62) for W.R. Logie, New Zealand maintenance officer and field mechanic who spent nearly two years in the Antarctic and was Deputy-Leader of Scott Base during the 1962–63 season.

=== Brunner Glacier ===
85°14′S 175°38′W. A narrow steep-walled glacier 2 nautical miles (3.7 km; 2.3 mi) long, descending the west slope of the Cumulus Hills between Landry Bluff and Halfmoon Bluff to enter Shackleton Glacier. Named by the Texas Tech Shackleton Glacier Expedition (1964–65) for S/Sgt. Donald R. Brunner, member of the U.S. Army Aviation Detachment which supported the expedition.

=== Gillespie Glacier ===
85°11′S 175°12′W. A small tributary glacier just southwest of Mount Kenyon, descending the west slopes of the Cumulus Hills to enter Shackleton Glacier. Named by US-ACAN for Lester F. Gillespie, USARP meteorologist at South Pole Station, winter 1962.

=== McGregor Glacier ===
85°08′S 174°50′W. A tributary glacier, 14 nautical miles (26 km; 16 mi) long and 3 nautical miles (5.6 km; 3.5 mi) wide, draining the southwest slopes of the Prince Olav Mountains and flowing west to enter Shackleton Glacier just north of Cumulus Hills. Named by the Southern Party of NZGSAE (1961–62) for V.R. McGregor, geologist with that party.

=== Gatlin Glacier ===
85°10′S 173°30′W. A tributary glacier 7 nautical miles (13 km; 8.1 mi) long, flowing northwest between the Cumulus Hills and Red Raider Rampart to enter the south side of McGregor Glacier. Named by US-ACAN for Harold C. Gatlin, USARP meteorologist at the South Pole Station, winter 1964.

=== Yeats Glacier ===
85°01′S 175°00′W. A tributary glacier about 8 nautical miles (15 km; 9.2 mi) long, flowing west from the north side of Mount Finley to enter Shackleton Glacier just north of Lockhart Ridge. Named by F. Alton Wade, leader of the Texas Tech Shackleton Glacier Expeditions (1962-63 and 1964–65), for Vestal L. Yeats, a member of the Texas Technological College faculty and of both expeditions.

=== Dick Glacier ===
84°53′S 175°50′W. A tributary glacier, 7 nautical miles (13 km; 8.1 mi) long, flowing west from Mount Campbell to enter Shackleton Glacier just north of Taylor Nunatak, in the Queen Maud Mountains. Named by US-ACAN for Lt. Alan L. Dick, a member of U.S. Navy Squadron VX-6 during Deep Freeze 1964.

=== McCuistion Glacier ===
84°49′S 175°30′W. A tributary glacier, 4 nautical miles (7.4 km; 4.6 mi) long, which flows west along the north side of Lubbock Ridge to enter Shackleton Glacier. Named by US-ACAN for Joshua P. McCuistion, Construction Driver 1st Class, USN, who was injured in an Otter airplane crash on Dec. 22, 1955, following take-off from the Cape Bird area.

=== Massam Glacier ===
84°33′S 175°12′W. A glacier, 11 nautical miles (20 km; 13 mi) long, flowing north between Waldron Spurs and Longhorn Spurs to enter the Ross Ice Shelf just east of the mouth of Shackleton Glacier. Named by the Southern Party of NZGSAE (1963–64) for D. Massam, a member of that party.

=== Barrett Glacier ===
84°37′S 174°10′W. A glacier draining from the north slopes of the Prince Olav Mountains, about 15 nautical miles (28 km; 17 mi) long, flowing between Longhorn Spurs and Gabbro Hills to the Ross Ice Shelf. Named by the Southern Party of NZGSAE (1963–64) for Peter J. Barrett, geologist with that party.

== Other features ==
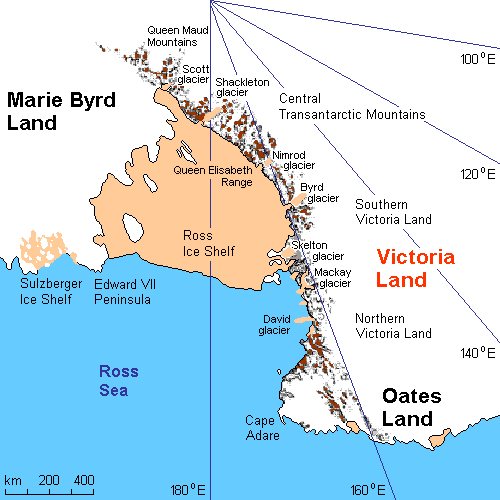
Area map of Shackleton glacier.

Features in the glacier, from south to north, include:

=== Vickers Nunatak ===
85°20′S 176°40′W. A massive nunatak in the upper Shackleton Glacier, about 11 nautical miles (20 km; 13 mi) southeast of Mount Black. Named by the Southern Party of the NZGSAE (1961–62) for E. Vickers, radio operator at Scott Base, who was in contact with the Southern Party almost every day during the three months they were in the field.

=== Eckins Nunatak ===
85°07′S 175°51′W. A small, isolated nunatak lying 5 nautical miles (9.3 km; 5.8 mi) northeast of Matador Mountain, in the east part of Shackleton Glacier. Named by US-ACAN for Henry J. Eckins, USARP meteorologist at South Pole Station, winter 1961.

=== Taylor Nunatak ===
84°54′S 176°00′W. A large nunatak at the east side of Shackleton Glacier, just south of the terminus of Dick Glacier, in the Queen Maud Mountains. Named by the Southern Party of NZGSAE (1961–62) for Thomas F. Taylor, topographic surveyor, USGS, who worked near the mouth of Shackleton Glacier in the summers of 1960-61 and 1961–62, and in the Pensacola Mountains, 1962–63.

=== Swithinbank Moraine ===
85°00′S 177°05′W. A spectacular medial moraine in the Shackleton Glacier. It trends northward from Matador Mountain. Named by the Southern Party of the NZGSAE (1961–62) for Charles W. Swithinbank, a member of the University of Michigan glaciological and survey parties to the major glaciers feeding the Ross Ice Shelf in 1960-61 and 1961-62.

=== Gemini Nunataks ===
84°42′S 176°38′W. Two nunataks of similar size and appearance in a prominent position near the west wall of Shackleton Glacier, just southeast of Mount Cole. Named by F. Alton Wade, leader of the Texas Tech Shackleton Glacier Party (1962–63), after the constellation Gemini, which contains the twin stars Castor and Pollux.

== Sources ==
- Alberts, Fred G., ed. (1995), Geographic Names of the Antarctic (PDF) (2 ed.), United States Board on Geographic Names This article incorporates public domain material from websites or documents of the United States Board on Geographic Names.
- Liv Glacier, USGS: United States Geological Survey
- Shackleton Glacier, USGS: United States Geological Survey
- This article incorporates public domain material from websites or documents of the United States Geological Survey.
