= Cumulus Hills =

Hills in Antarctica

- Location within Antarctica

Geography
- Continent: Antarctica
- Region: Ross Dependency
- Range coordinates: 85°20′S 175°0′W

The Cumulus Hills (85°20′S 175°0′W) are several groups of largely barren hills in Antarctica. Divided by the Logie Glacier, they are bounded by Shackleton Glacier on the west, McGregor Glacier on the north and Zaneveld Glacier on the south.

== Discovery and naming ==
The exposed rock in this area was observed on a number of occasions to give rise to the formation of cumulus clouds, considered to be very rare at this elevation. The hills were named by the Southern Party of the New Zealand Geological Survey Antarctic Expedition (1961–62) because of these clouds.

== Features ==
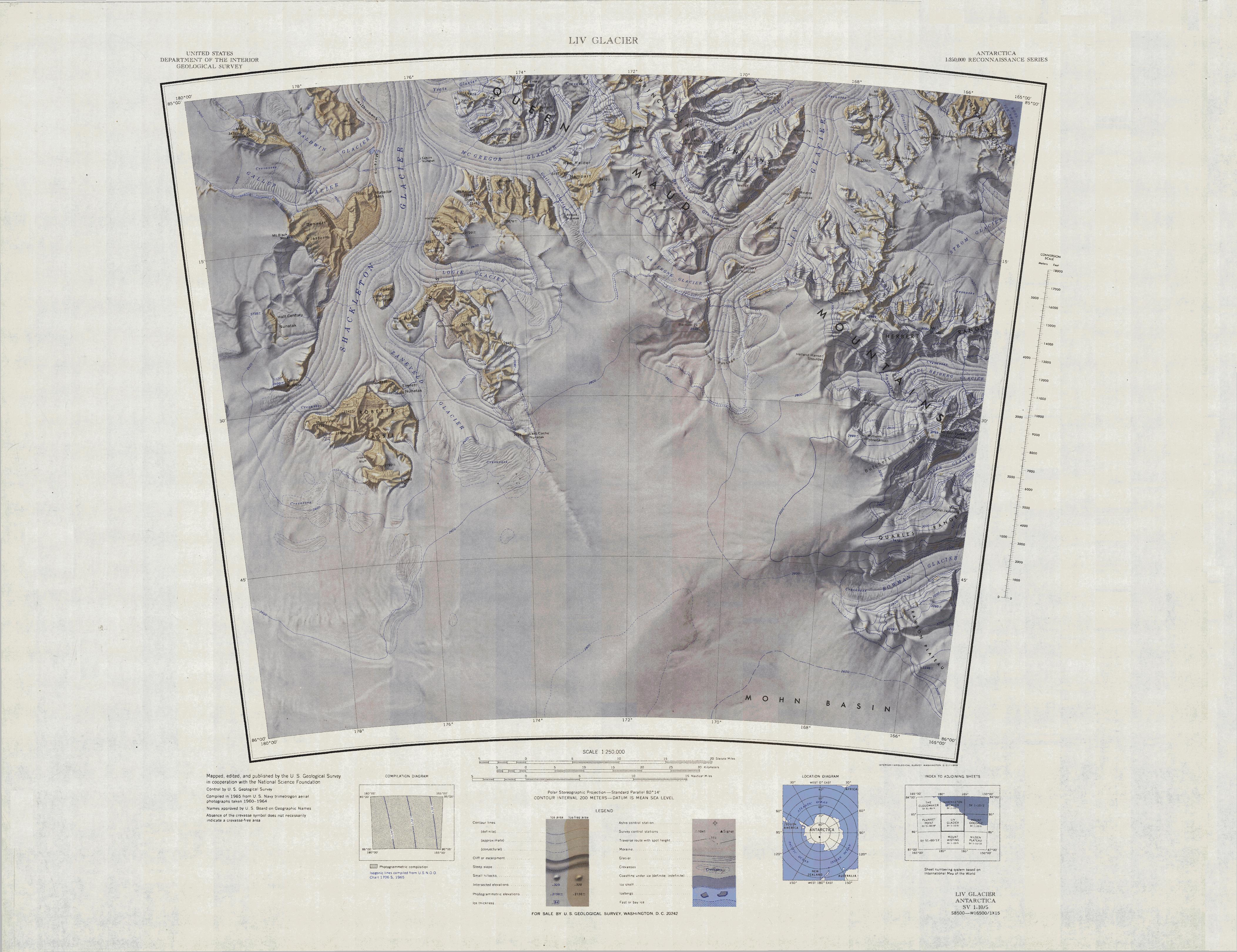
Cumuls Hills in northwest of map

The Cumulus Hills are bounded by the Shackleton Glacier to the west, Zaneveld Glacier to the south and McGregor Glacier and Gatlin Glacier to the north. There is a large snowfield to the east. From south to north, features include Schroeder Hill, Wiest Bluff, Vickers Nunatak and Ellis Bluff, all south of Logie Glacier, which flows west into Shackleton Glacier. North of this are Landry Bluff, separated by Brunner Glacier from Halfmoon Bluff, Gillespie Glacier, Shenk Peak, Mount Kenyon, La Prade Valley, Rougier Hill and Cheu Valley. To the east of Gatlin Glacier is Red Raider Rampart.

=== Schroeder Hill ===
85°23′S 175°12′W. A rock prominence, 2,680 metres (8,790 ft) high, standing 3.5 nautical miles (6.5 km; 4.0 mi) southeast of Ellis Bluff. Named by the United States Advisory Committee on Antarctic Names (US-ACAN) for Henry B. Schroeder, USARP meteorologist at South Pole Station, winter 1964, who was field assistant at Byrd Station, 1964-65.

=== Wiest Bluff ===
85°22′S 176°22′W. A prominent bluff, 2,160 metres (7,090 ft) high, standing just north of the confluence of Shackleton and Zaneveld Glaciers and marking the west extremity of the Cumulus Hills. Named by US-ACAN for William G. Wiest, USARP ionospheric scientist at the South Pole Station, 1964.

=== Ellis Bluff ===
85°20′S 175°35′W. A rock bluff rising to 2,280 metres (7,480 ft) at the south side of the mouth of Logie Glacier. Named by US-ACAN for W. Ellis, a chief air controlman, United States Navy, during Operation Deep Freeze 1965 and 1966.

=== Landry Bluff ===
85°16′S 175°37′W. A rock bluff in the Cumulus Hills, standing just north of the mouth of Logie Glacier, where the latter joins Shackleton Glacier. Named by US-ACAN for Edward J. Landry, USARP meteorologist who wintered at Byrd Station in 1963 and at South Pole Station in 1965.

=== Halfmoon Bluff ===
85°13′S 175°38′W. A rock bluff overlooking the east side of Shackleton Glacier, rising immediately north of the mouth of Brunner Glacier. So named by the Texas Tech Shackleton Glacier Expedition (1964–65) because its sheer cliffs and crescent shaped top give it the appearance of a half moon.

=== Collinson Ridge ===
85°13′S 175°21′W. A bare rock spur next north of Halfmoon Bluff in the northwest part of Cumulus Hills. Mapped by USGS from surveys and U.S. Navy aerial photographs, 1960-64. Named by US-ACAN for Prof. James W. Collinson, Ohio State University, a member of the Institute of Polar Studies geological expedition who worked at this spur in 1970-71.

=== Shenk Peak ===
85°11′S 174°45′W. A sharp peak 2,540 metres (8,330 ft) high, standing just southeast of Mount Kenyon, between Gillespie Glacier and LaPrade Valley. Named by the Texas Tech Shackleton Glacier Expedition (1964–65) for John C. Shenk, graduate student at Texas Technological College and a member of the expedition.

=== Mount Kenyon ===
85°10′S 174°52′W. A mountain, 2,260 metres (7,410 ft) high, standing 1 nautical mile (1.9 km; 1.2 mi) northwest of Shenk Peak in the north part of the Cumulus Hills. Named by F. Alton Wade, leader of the Shackleton Glacier Party of USARP (1962–63) after Kenyon College, Gambler, Ohio, his Alma Mater.

=== Barry Hill ===
85°10′S 174°44′W. An ice-free hill just west of the mouth of LaPrade Valley and about 1 nautical mile (1.9 km; 1.2 mi) north-northeast of Mount Kenyon. Named by US-ACAN for Lt. Richard P. Barry, CEC, United States Navy, communications officer at McMurdo Station, winter 1957, who participated in United States Navy Operation Deep Freeze I, II and III, 1955-58.

=== LaPrade Valley ===
85°11′S 174°36′W. A valley with steep rock walls and ice-covered floor, about 3 nautical miles (5.6 km; 3.5 mi) long, extending north to McGregor Glacier, just west of Rougier Hill. Named by the Texas Tech Shackleton Glacier Expedition (1964–65) for Kerby E. LaPrade, graduate student at Texas Technological College, and a member of the expedition.

=== Thrinaxodon Col ===
85°12′S 174°19′W. A rock col 2 nautical miles (3.7 km; 2.3 mi) southeast of Rougier Hill. The col is along the ridge that trends southward from Rougier Hill. The name was proposed to US-ACAN in 1971 by geologist David H. Elliot of the Ohio State University Institute of Polar Studies. The col is a very important fossil (vertebrate) locality at which several specimens of the mammal-like reptile Thrinaxodon were found.

=== Rougier Hill ===
85°10′S 174°30′W. An ice-free hill just east of LaPrade Valley in the north part of the Cumulus Hills, overlooking the south side of McGregor Glacier. Named by the Texas Tech Shackleton Glacier Expedition (1964 65) for Michael Rougier, staff photographer with Life Magazine who was seriously injured while climbing this hill with the expedition.

=== Cheu Valley ===
85°11′S 173°54′W. A narrow, north–south trending valley in the Cumulus Hills, about 3 nautical miles (5.6 km; 3.5 mi) long, with its north end opening at the south side of McGregor Glacier, just west of the mouth of Gatlin Glacier. Named by the Texas Tech-Shackleton Glacier Expedition (1964–65) for Specialist 5th Class Daniel T.L. Cheu, member of the U.S. Army Aviation Detachment which supported the expedition.

=== Ringed Nunatak ===
85°13′S 173°13′W. A small but conspicuous nunatak located in the icefall at the head of Gatlin Glacier. So named by the Texas Tech Shackleton Glacier Expedition (1964–65) because a ring of moraine completely surrounds the nunatak.

=== Red Raider Rampart ===
85°09′S 173°12′W. A rugged ice and rock wall just east of the juncture of the Gatlin and McGregor Glaciers. Named by the Texas Tech Shackleton Glacier Expedition (1964–65) for the student body of Texas Technological College, whose athletic representatives are known as the Red Raiders.

== Sources ==
- Alberts, Fred G., ed. (1995), Geographic Names of the Antarctic (PDF) (2 ed.), United States Board on Geographic Names This article incorporates public domain material from websites or documents of the United States Board on Geographic Names.
- Liv Glacier, USGS: United States Geological Survey

This article incorporates public domain material from websites or documents of the United States Geological Survey.
