= Baker (disambiguation) =

A baker is someone who primarily bakes bread.

Baker or Bakers may also refer to:

== Business ==
- Bakers Coaches, trading name BakerBus, a bus and coach operator in Staffordshire, England
- Baker Hughes, an oilfield services company
- Baker McKenzie, a law firm headquartered in Chicago
- Baker Motor Vehicle, an American automobile manufacturer from 1899 to 1914
- Baker Publishing Group, an Evangelical Christian book publisher
- Baker Skateboards, an American skateboarding company founded in 2000
- Baker's bourbon, a Jim Beam product
- Baker's Chocolate, a line of baking chocolate produced by Kraft Foods
- Baker's Drive-Thru, a chain of fast-food restaurants in Southern California
- Baker's Supermarkets, an American supermarket chain

== Military ==
- USS Baker (DE-190), a US Navy destroyer escort in commission from 1943 to 1946
- USS Paul G. Baker, the name of more than one US Navy ship
- Baker (military code-name), a series of training exercises conducted by the US Army and several Asian countries
- Baker rifle, used by the British Army
- Baker, the second of two nuclear weapon tests in Operation Crossroads, conducted by the US in 1946

== People and fictional characters ==
- Baker (surname), including a list of people and fictional characters with the surname
- Baker Mayfield (born 1995), American football player
- Standard author abbreviation of John Gilbert Baker (1834–1920), English botanist

== Places ==
=== Multiple countries ===
- Baker Island (disambiguation), several islands
- Baker Lake (disambiguation), several lakes
- Baker River (disambiguation), several rivers in North and South America
- Mount Baker (disambiguation), several mountains

=== Iran ===
- Baker, Iran, a village in Fars Province
- Baker, Mamasani, a village in Fars Province

=== United States ===
- Baker, California, a census-designated place
- a former name of Boron, California
- Baker, Florida, an unincorporated community in Okaloosa County
- Baker County, Florida
- Baker County, Georgia
- Baker, Illinois, an unincorporated community
- Baker, Kansas, an unincorporated community
- Baker, Louisiana, a city
- Bakers, Michigan, a ghost town
- Baker, Minnesota, an unincorporated community and census-designated place
- Baker, Missouri, an inactive village
- Baker, Montana, a city
- Baker, Nebraska, a ghost town
- Baker, Nevada, a census-designated place
- Baker, North Dakota, an unincorporated community
- Baker, Oklahoma, an unincorporated community
- Baker County, Oregon
- Bakers, Tennessee, a neighborhood of Nashville
- Baker, West Virginia, an unincorporated community
- Diocese of Baker in Oregon
- Baker City, Oregon
- Bakers Island, Massachusetts
- Mount Baker, Washington state
- Baker Mountain (Piscataquis County, Maine)
- Baker Mountain (West Virginia)
- Baker Peak (Idaho)
- Baker Peak, in the Snake Range of Nevada
- Baker Peak (Vermont), a mountain in Vermont
- Baker Township (disambiguation)

=== Other countries ===
- Bakers, Saint Peter, Barbados, a populated place in the parish of Saint Peter, Barbados
- Baker Lake (Nunavut), Canada, a body of water
- Baker Channel, in Chile
- Baker's Island, Hampshire, England

== Sports ==
- Baker, a pickleball term
- Baker format, a team game format in bowling
  - Baker 300, a perfect score using the format in tenpin bowling

== Other uses ==
- Baker Street, London, England
- Baker University, a private, residential university in Baldwin City, Kansas, United States
- Baker House, an undergraduate dormitory at MIT
- Baker's Biographical Dictionary of Musicians
- The Baker (Indianapolis, Indiana), a historic apartment building
- The Baker (2007 film), a British comedy crime thriller
- The Baker (2022 film), Canadian-American vigilante action film
- Baker Bowl, popular name for a demolished baseball park in Philadelphia, Pennsylvania, United States
- Baker Trail, a hiking trail in Pennsylvania

== See also ==
- Baker v. Carr, a 1962 US Supreme Court case
- Baker v. Nelson, a 1972 Minnesota Supreme Court case
- Baker v. Vermont, a 1999 Vermont Supreme Court case
- Baker Act, common alternate name for the Florida Mental Health Act
- Bakker
- Becker (disambiguation)
