= Baker Hill =

Baker Hill or variant, may refer to:

- Baker Hill site, a 16th-century Huron-Wendat village, see Ratcliff Site
- Bakerhill, Alabama, a town in U.S.A.
- Bakers Hill, Western Australia, a town in Australia
- Baker's Hill, England, a village in UK
- Bakery Hill, Victoria, suburb of Ballarat

== See also ==
- Baker (disambiguation)
- Baker Mountain (disambiguation)
- Mount Baker (disambiguation)
