= Baker Mountain =

Baker Mountain may refer to:

- Baker Mountain (Colorado), US
- Baker Mountain (Piscataquis County, Maine), US
- Baker Mountain (West Virginia), US
- Baker Mountain (ski area), in Moscow, Maine, US

== See also ==
- List of mountains named Baker Mountain
- Baker (disambiguation)
- Baker Peak (disambiguation)
- Mount Baker (disambiguation)
