= Holzrichter =

Holzrichter is a surname. Notable people with the surname include:

- John Holzrichter, American physicist
- William Holzrichter (1922–2005), American table tennis player

== See also ==
- Holzrichter Glacier, a glacier of the Ross Dependency, Antarctica
