= Baker Peak =

Baker Peak may be:

- Baker Peak (Idaho)
- Baker Peak (Nevada), in the Snake Range of Nevada
- Baker Peak (Vermont), a mountain in Vermont

== See also ==
- Baker (disambiguation)
- Baker Mountain (disambiguation)
- Mount Baker (disambiguation)
