= Mount Baker (disambiguation) =

Mount Baker is a volcano located in Washington, United States.

Mount Baker may also refer to:

== Places ==
- Mount Baker (Ruwenzoris), in the Ruwenzori Range on the border of Uganda and the Congo
- Mount Baker (Waputik Mountains), in the Canadian Rockies
- Mount Baker (Antarctica), in Antarctica
- Mt. Baker Ski Area, located on the mountain in Washington
- Mount Baker, Seattle, a neighborhood in Seattle
  - Mount Baker (Link station), a rail station that serves the neighborhood
- Mount Baker Secondary School, Cranbrook, British Columbia, Canada
- Mount Marcus Baker, in Alaska

== Other uses ==
- USS Mount Baker, either of two ships named after this mountain:
  - USS Mount Baker (AE-4), an ammunition ship of the U.S. Navy
  - USNS Mount Baker (T-AE-34), an ammunition ship commissioned in 1972

== See also ==
- Baker (disambiguation)
- Baker Mountain (disambiguation)
- Baker Peak (disambiguation)
