= USS Mount Baker =

USS Mount Baker may refer to the following ships operated by the United States Navy:

- USS Mount Baker (AE-4), a Type C2 ship originally commissioned as Kilauea in May 1941 and renamed Mount Baker, March 1943. She was decommissioned and struck in 1969
- USS Mount Baker (T-AE-34), is a Kilauea-class ammunition ship commissioned July 1972 as USS Mount Baker (AE-34)

== See also ==
- Mount Baker (disambiguation)
