= Lillie Range =

Mountain range of Antarctica

- Location within Antarctica

Geography
- Continent: Antarctica
- Region: Ross Dependency
- Range coordinates: 84°50′S 170°25′W

The Lillie Range (84°50′S 170°25′W) in Antarctica extends northward from the Prince Olav Mountains (in the vicinity of Mount Fisher) to the Ross Ice Shelf. Mounts Hall, Daniel, Krebs and Mason are in the range.

== Naming ==
The Lillie Range was named by the Southern Party of the New Zealand Geological Survey Antarctic Expedition (NZGSAE) (1963–64) for A.R. Lillie, professor of geology at the University of Auckland.

== Location ==
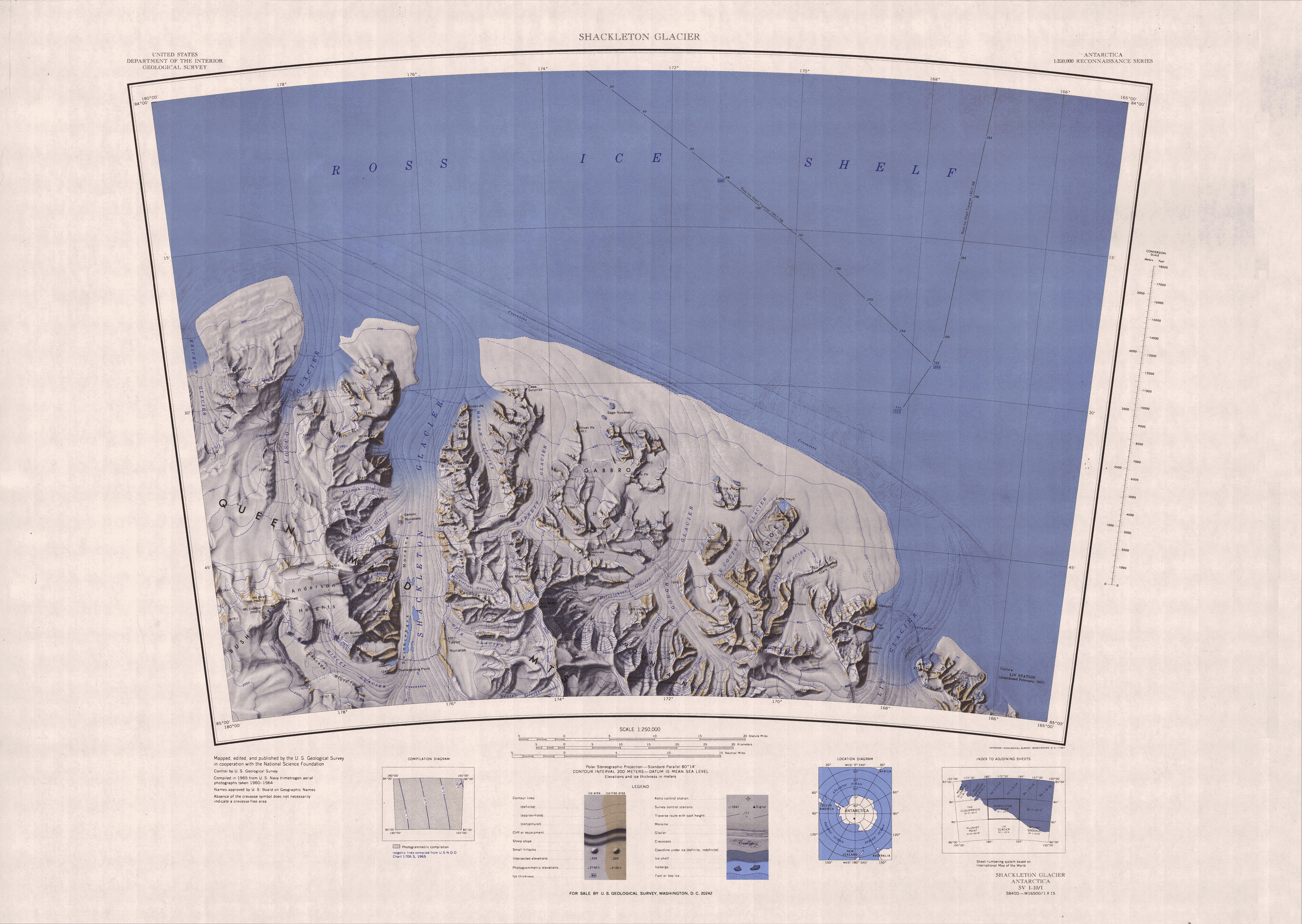
Lillie Range in northeast

The Lillie Range lies to the east of the lower Gough Glacier and to the west of the mouth of the Liv Glacier, extending along the Ross Ice Shelf to the north. Coastal features, from west to east, include the Bravo Hills and Mount Thurman, Le Couteur Glacier, Cape Irwyn and Mount Mason, Morris Glacier, Clark Spur and Mount Henson. Beside the mouth of Liv Glacier are, from north to south, The Tusk, Mayer Crags, Mount Koob, Tantalus Bluffs and Mount Ferguson. Further inland are Mount Skinner, Mount Krebs, Mount Dryfoose, Allaire Peak, Mount Daniel and Mount Hall.

== Coastal features ==
Features along the Ross Ice Shelf, to the north of the range, from west to east:

=== Bravo Hills ===
84°41′S 171°00′W. A group of low peaks rising to 780 metres (2,560 ft) high, which borders the Ross Ice Shelf between Gough and Le Couteur Glaciers. So named by the Southern Party of NZGSAE (1963-64) because their supply Depot B (Bravo) was located nearby.

=== Mount Thurman ===
84°42′S 170°51′W. The highest summit, 780 metres (2,560 ft) high, in the Bravo Hills along the edge of Ross Ice Shelf, located between the mouths of Gough and Le Couteur Glaciers. Named by the United States Advisory Committee on Antarctic Names (US-ACAN) for Commander Robert K. Thurman, United States Navy, Assistant Chief of Staff for Operations, United States Naval Support Force, Antarctica, 1963.

=== Le Couteur Glacier ===
84°42′S 170°30′W. A glacier, 15 nautical miles (28 km; 17 mi) long, which drains the northwest slopes of Mount Hall and Mount Daniel and flows north along the west side of Lillie Range to the Ross Ice Shelf. Named by the Southern Party of NZGSAE (1963-64) for P.C. Le Couteur, geologist with the New Zealand Federated Mountain Clubs Antarctic Expedition, 1962–63.

=== Cape Irwyn ===
84°41′S 170°05′W. A rock cape at the edge of the Ross Ice Shelf forming the north extremity of Lillie Range in the foothills of the Prince Olav Mountains. Named by the Southern Party of the NZGSAE (1963-64) for Irwyn Smith, relief radio operator at Scott Base, 1963-64.

=== Mount Mason ===
84°43′S 169°48′W. A peak, 815 metres (2,674 ft) high, at the edge of Ross Ice Shelf, surmounting the north extremity of Lillie Range. Discovered and photographed by the Byrd Antarctic Expedition (1928-30) and named for Howard F. Mason, radio engineer who wintered with that expedition at Little America.

=== Morris Glacier ===
84°46′S 169°30′W. A glacier, 10 nautical miles (19 km; 12 mi) long, which drains north from Mount Daniel to the Ross Ice Shelf between Lillie Range and Clark Spur. Named by the southern party of NZGSAE, 1963-64, for Commander Marion E. Morris, United States Navy, Executive Officer (later Commanding Officer) of Squadron VX-6, who piloted the aircraft which flew the 1963-64 party's reconnaissance.

=== Clark Spur ===
84°47′S 169°12′W. A narrow, rocky spur about 3 nautical miles (5.6 km; 3.5 mi) long, extending from the foothills of Prince Olav Mountains to the edge of the Ross Ice Shelf. The spur forms the east side of the mouth of Morris Glacier, about 6 nautical miles (11 km; 6.9 mi) northwest of Mount Henson. Discovered and photographed by the Byrd Antarctic Expedition (1928-30) and named for Arnold H. Clark, asst. physicist who wintered with the expedition.

== Liv Glacier mouth ==
Features along the west of the mouth of the Liv Glacier are, from north to south:

=== Mount Henson ===
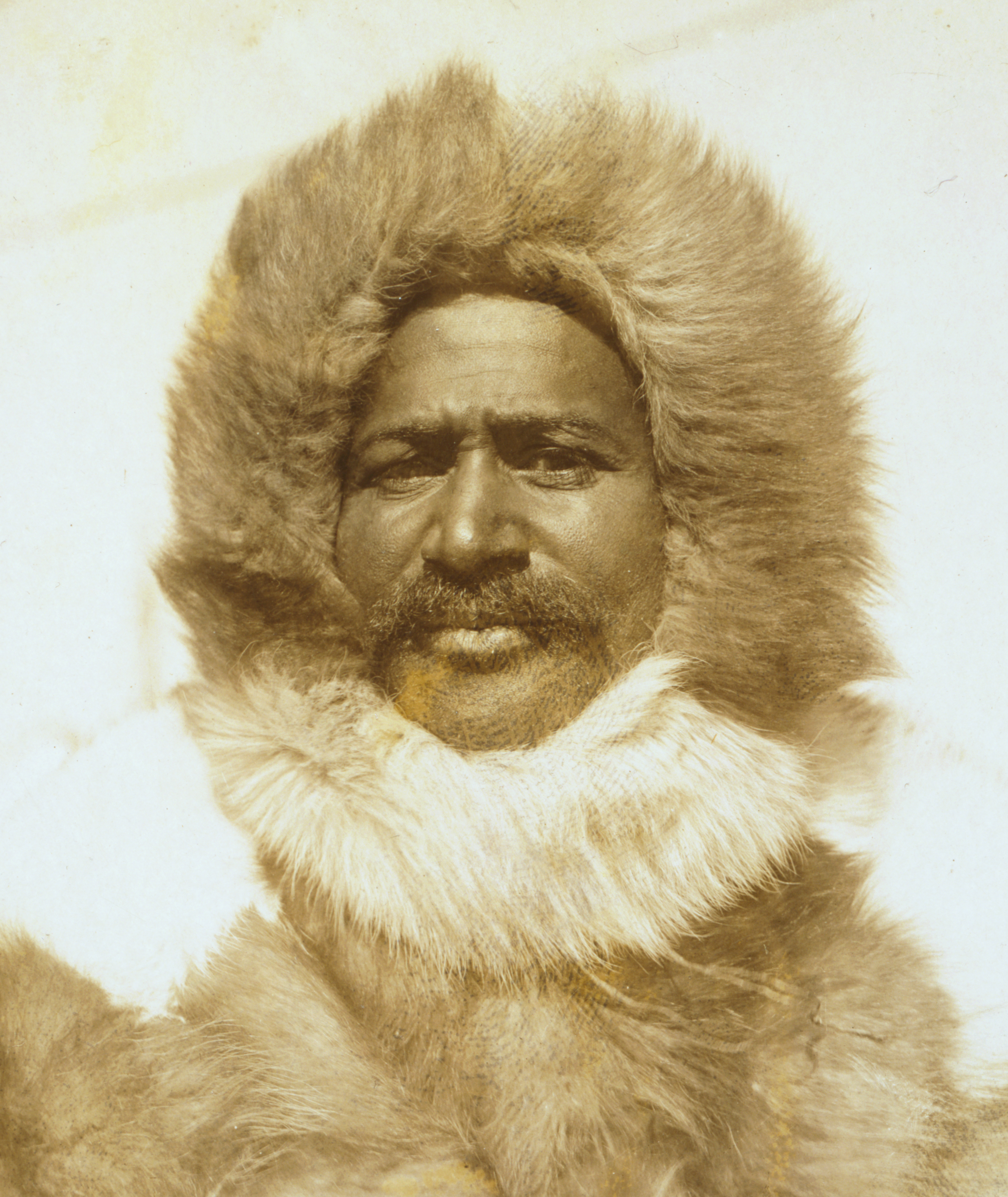
Matthew Henson 1910

84°50′S 168°21′W. An ice free summit, 905 metres (2,969 ft) high, standing at the northeast extremity of Mayer Crags, forming the northwest portal to Liv Glacier where the latter enters Ross Ice Shelf . Discovered and photographed by the Byrd Antarctic Expedition (1928–30), in November 1929, and named for Matthew Henson, a member of R. Admiral Peary's party which reached the North Pole in 1909.

=== The Tusk ===
84°52′S 168°15′W. A sharply pointed peak of white marble, about 460 metres (1,510 ft) high, in the east part of Mayer Crags. It stands 1.5 nautical miles (2.8 km; 1.7 mi) south of Mount Henson at the west side of the terminus of Liv Glacier. A descriptive name given by the Southern Party of the NZGSAE, 1963-64.

=== Mayer Crags ===
84°53′S 168°45′W. A rugged V-shaped massif, 10 nautical miles (19 km; 12 mi) long, surmounted by several sharp peaks, located at the west side of the mouth of Liv Glacier, where the latter enters Ross Ice Shelf. Named by US-ACAN for Lt. Robert V. Mayer, United States Navy, pilot of Hercules aircraft in four Antarctic seasons; plane commander for a mid-winter evacuation flight on June 26, 1964.

=== Mount Koob ===
84°53′S 169°02′W. The highest peak, 1,600 metres (5,200 ft) high, in Mayer Crags, standing 4 nautical miles (7.4 km; 4.6 mi) northwest of Mount Ferguson. Named by US-ACAN for Deny D. Koob, United States Antarctic Research Program (USARP) biologist at McMurdo Station in the 1964-65 and 1965-66 seasons.

=== Tantalus Bluffs ===
84°55′S 168°25′W. High rock bluffs forming the northeast shoulder of Mount Ferguson, overlooking the west side of the terminus of Liv Glacier near its entry into Ross Ice Shelf. So named by the Southern Party of NZGSAE (1963-64) because the bluffs appeared to be of geologic interest, but could not be reached. In attempting to penetrate the crevasse field northeast of the bluffs one of the geologists was injured in a crevasse accident.

=== Mount Ferguson ===
84°56′S 168°35′W. An irregular, mound-shaped mass, 1,190 metres (3,900 ft) high, which surmounts the south part of Mayer Crags on the west side of Liv Glacier. Discovered and photographed by the ByrdAE (1928-30), and named for Homer L. Ferguson, president of the Newport News Shipbuilding and Dry Dock Co., Newport News, VA, which made repairs and alterations on ByrdAE ships.

== Inland features ==
=== Mount Skinner ===
84°46′S 171°10′W. A flattish, mainly ice-free mesa, 3 nautical miles (5.6 km; 3.5 mi) long and 2 nautical miles (3.7 km; 2.3 mi) wide. It arises to 1,060 metres (3,480 ft) immediately south of Bravo Hills, between Gough and Le Couteur Glaciers, near the edge of the Ross Ice Shelf. Surveyed by the United States Ross Ice Shelf Traverse Party (1957-58) under A.P. Crary, and named for Bernard W. Skinner, aviation and tractor mechanic with the ByrdAE (1933-35).

=== Mount Krebs ===
84°50′S 170°20′W. A prominent rock peak, 1,630 metres (5,350 ft) high, surmounting the central part of the main ridge of Lillie Range, 4 nautical miles (7.4 km; 4.6 mi) north of Mount Daniel, in the foothills of the Prince Olav Mountains. Discovered by the United States Ross Ice Shelf Traverse Party (1957-58) under A.P. Crary, and named by him for Cdr. Manson Krebs, United States Navy, helicopter and airplane pilot of United States Navy Squadron VX-6 during Deep Freeze operations.

=== Mount Dryfoose ===
84°52′S 169°56′W. A ridge-type mountain about 2 nautical miles (3.7 km; 2.3 mi) long, with peaks rising above 1,600 metres (5,200 ft) high, located 3 nautical miles (5.6 km; 3.5 mi) northeast of Mount Daniel astride the ridge descending northeast from the south part of Lillie Range. Discovered by the United States Ross Ice Shelf Traverse Party (1957-58) under A.P. Crary, and named after Lt. Earl D. Dryfoose, Jr., United States Navy Reserve, pilot of United States Navy Squadron VX-6 during Deep Freeze operations.

=== Allaire Peak ===
84°53′S 170°54′W. .A rock peak, 1,900 metres (6,200 ft) high, standing 3 nautical miles (5.6 km; 3.5 mi) northwest of Mount Hall, between Gough and Le Couteur Glaciers in the Prince Olav Mountains. Named by US-ACAN for Captain C.J. Allaire, USA, on the Staff of the Commander, United States Naval Support Force, Antarctica, during United States Navy OpDFrz 1963.

=== Mount Daniel ===
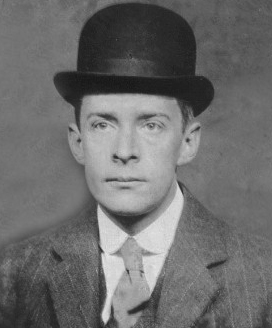
Robert W. Daniel

84°54′S 170°17′W. A prominent peak 2,440 metres (8,010 ft) high, standing 1 nautical mile (1.9 km; 1.2 mi) north of Mount Hall, in the Lillie Range of the Queen Maud Mountains. Discovered and photographed by the Byrd Antarctic Expedition (1928-30), and named by Byrd for Robert Williams Daniel of Lower Brandon, VA, a contributor to the expedition.

=== Mount Hall ===
84°55′S 170°22′W. A rock peak, 2,430 metres (7,970 ft) high, standing 1.5 nautical miles (2.8 km; 1.7 mi) southwest of Mount Daniel, surmounting the snow-covered, tabular mountain block which forms the south end of Lillie Range, in the foothills of the Prince Olav Mountains. Discovered and photographed by the United States Ross Ice Shelf Traverse Party (1957-38) under A.P. Crary, and named by him for Lt. Cdr. Ray E. Hall, United States Navy, pilot of United States Navy Squadron VX-6 during Deep Freeze Operations.

=== Curtis Peaks ===
84°56′S 169°36′W. A small cluster of peaks surmounting the end of the ridge which extends east from Mount Hall of the Lillie Range, in the Queen Maud Mountains. Discovered and photographed by the United States Ross Ice Shelf Traverse Party (1957-58) led by A.P. Crary, and named for Lt. Cdr. Roy E. Curtis, United States Navy, pilot with United States Navy Squadron VX-6 during Deep Freeze Operations.

== Sources ==
- Alberts, Fred G., ed. (1995), Geographic Names of the Antarctic (PDF) (2 ed.), United States Board on Geographic Names This article incorporates public domain material from websites or documents of the United States Board on Geographic Names.
- Shackleton Glacier, USGS: United States Geological Survey
- This article incorporates public domain material from websites or documents of the United States Geological Survey.
