= Gough Glacier =

Glacier in Antarctica

- Location within Antarctica
- Coordinates: 84°42′S 171°35′W
- Terminus: Ross Ice Shelf

Gough Glacier (84°42′S 171°35′W) is an Antarctic glacier about 25 nautical miles (50 km) long, flowing from the northern slopes of the Prince Olav Mountains and the base of the Lillie Range and trending northward to the Ross Ice Shelf, between the Gabbro Hills and the Bravo Hills. It was named by the Southern Party of the New Zealand Geological Survey Antarctic Expedition (1963–64) for A.L. Gough, surveyor of the party.

== Course ==
Gough Glacier is the largest of the glaciers between the Liv Glacier and the Shackleton Glacier. Gough Glacier rises in the Prince Olav Mountains between Mount Smithson and Mount Hall. The Harwell glacier enters it from the left (west) near its head. It flows northwest to Mount Dodge. The Krout Glacier enters from the left before Mount Dodge, and the Holzrichter Glacier enters from the left beyond Mount Dodge. The Gough Glacier then turns to the north and flows to the Ross Ice Shelf between the Gabbro Hills to the west and the Bravo Hills to the east.

== Geology ==
The area around the glacier has late granodiorites and porphyritic adamellites. Pretectonic intrusives have been found on the western side of Gough Glacier, ranging from gabbro to adamellite. Glacial erratics of dolerite and of Beacon Group sedimentary rocks baken by dolerite sills have been found on the steep heights of the Bravo Hills, about 360 metres (1,180 ft) above the level of the Ross Ice Shelf. The nearest outcrops of these rocks are at the head of the Gough Glacier, which must have carried the erratics to the Bravo Hills at a time when the level of the glacier was higher.

== Tributaries ==
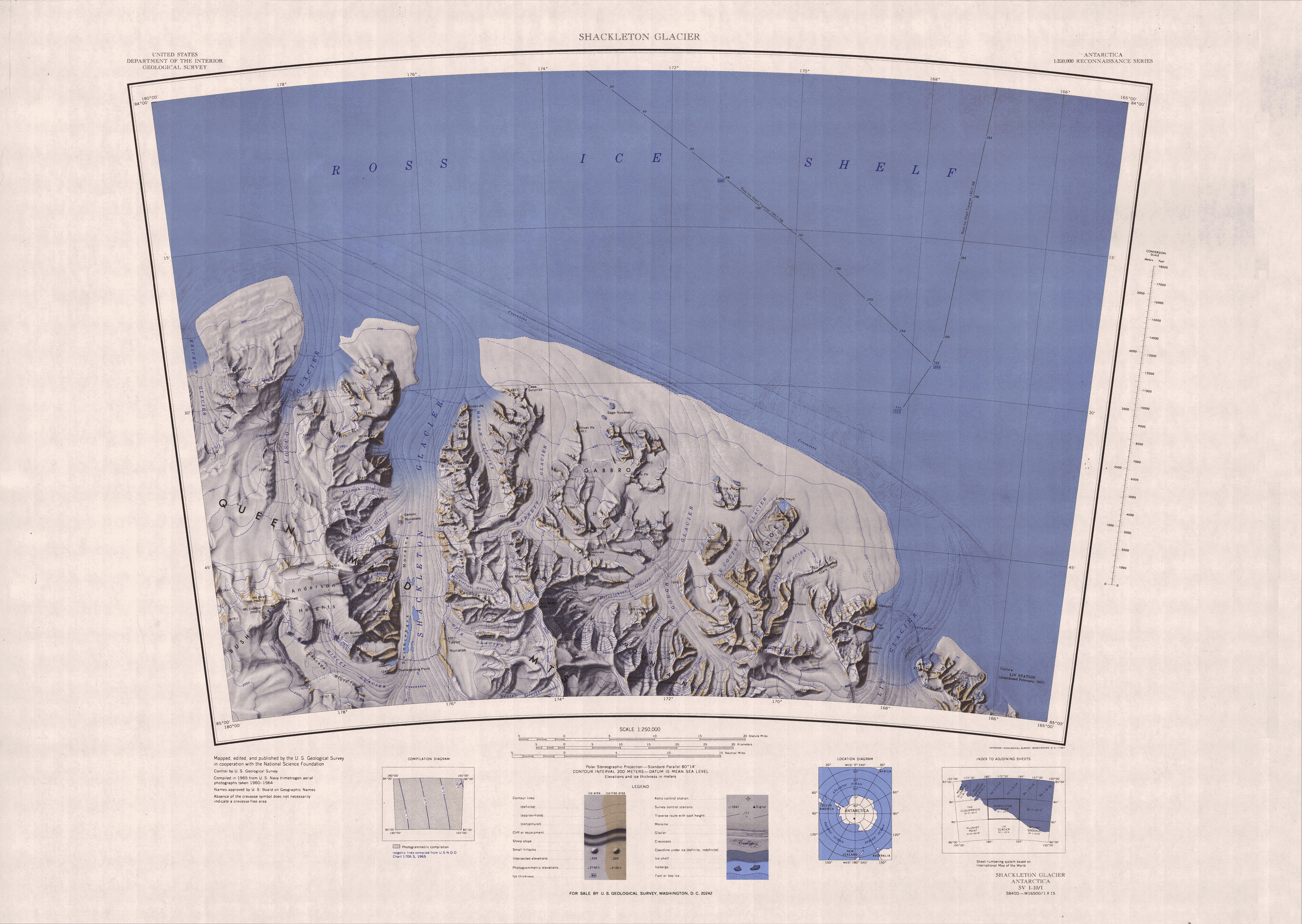
Gough glacier just east of center on the map

=== Harwell Glacier ===
84°57′S 171°29′W. A steep-walled tributary glacier, 3 nautical miles (5.6 km; 3.5 mi) long, descending the north slopes of the Prince Olav Mountains just east of Mount Smithson to enter the upper part of Gough Glacier. Named by the Advisory Committee on Antarctic Names (US-ACAN) for Lieutenant Thomas W. Harwell, CEC, USN, who participated in Naval Support Activity during Operation Deep Freeze 1964.

=== Krout Glacier ===
84°53′S 172°12′W. A tributary glacier, 4 nautical miles (7.4 km; 4.6 mi) long, draining the north slopes of the Prince Olav Mountains between Mount Sellery and Mount Smithson and entering Gough Glacier just east of Mount Dodge. Named by US-ACAN for Equipment Operator 1st Class Walter L. Krout, USN, of Operation Deep Freeze, 1964.

=== Holzrichter Glacier ===
84°50′S 172°30′W. A broad tributary glacier which drains the northeast slopes of the Prince Olav Mountains between Mount Wade and Mount Oliver and enters the Gough Glacier just north of Mount Dodge. Named by US-ACAN for Captain Max A. Holzrichter, USN, Deputy Commander and Chief of Staff, U.S. Naval Support Force, Antarctica, 1964 and 1965.

== Sources ==
- Alberts, Fred G., ed. (1995), Geographic Names of the Antarctic (PDF) (2 ed.), United States Board on Geographic Names This article incorporates public domain material from websites or documents of the United States Board on Geographic Names.
- McGregor, V.R. (May 1965), "Geology of the area between the Axel Heiberg and Shackleton Glaciers, Queen Maud Range, Antarctica", New Zealand Journal of Geology and Geophysics, 8 (2), The Royal Society of New Zealand
- Shackleton Glacier, USGS: United States Geological Survey
- This article incorporates public domain material from websites or documents of the United States Geological Survey.
