= Mount Pisgah (Essex County New York) =

Mountain in Essex County

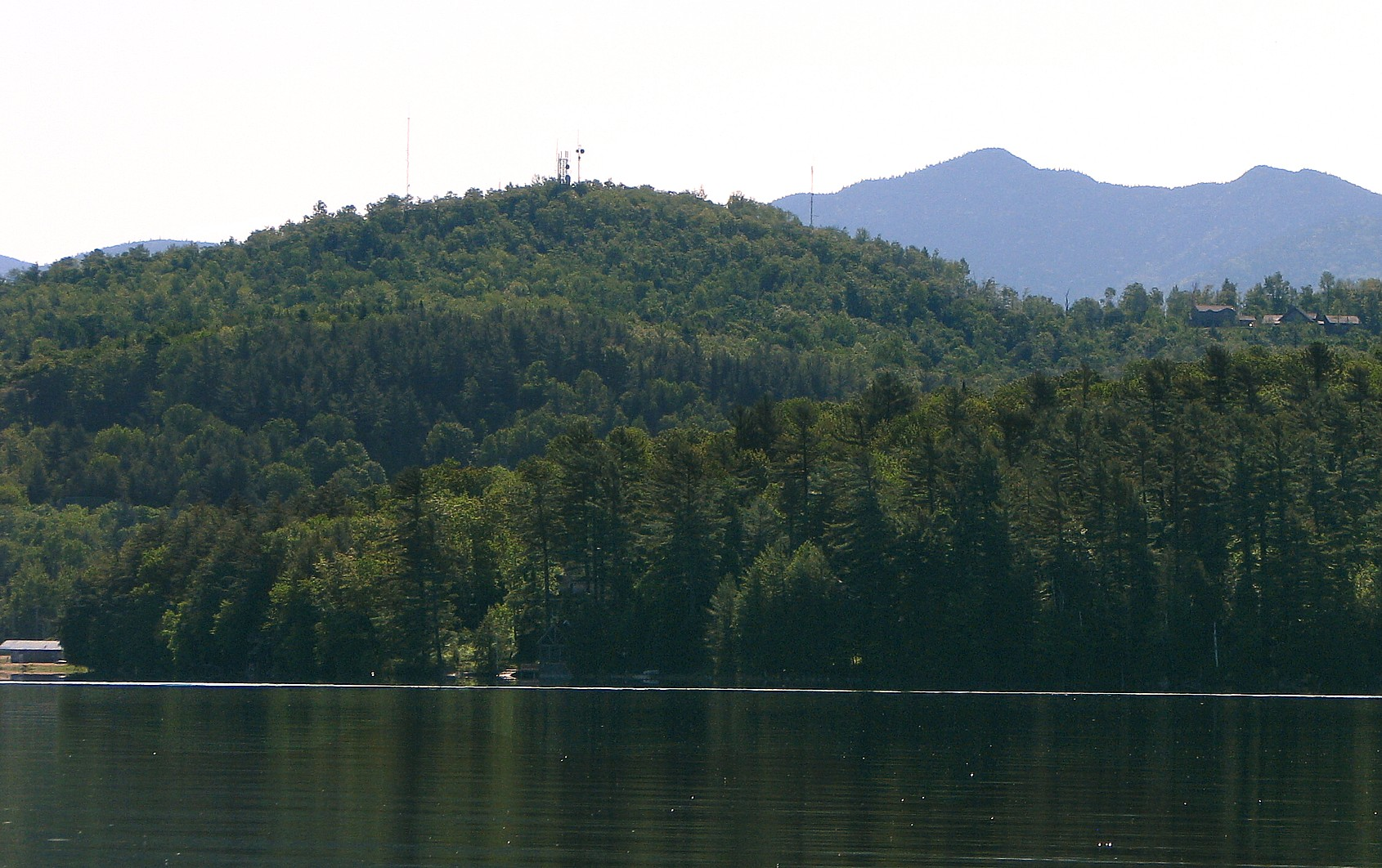
- Radio towers mark the summit of Mount Pisgah, left, from Lower Saranac Lake, the twin peaks of McKenzie Mountain at right

Highest point
- Elevation: 2,090 ft (640 m)
- Coordinates: 44°20′27″N 74°07′41″W

Geography
- Location within New York Adirondack Park Location within the United States
- Location: Essex County, New York
- Topo map: USGS Saranac Lake

Mount Pisgah is a 2,090-foot-tall (640 m) mountain in Essex County on the northern edge of the village of Saranac Lake. The mountain is privately owned. There is a small, dispersed housing development on the south side, communications towers on the summit, and a village ski area on the north side.

It is one of three small mountains surrounding Saranac Lake: the others are Baker Mountain and Dewey Mountain. The name comes from the Bible: it was the mountain east of Jordan from which Moses was permitted to view the promised land. In the 1890s it was called Jenkins Hill.

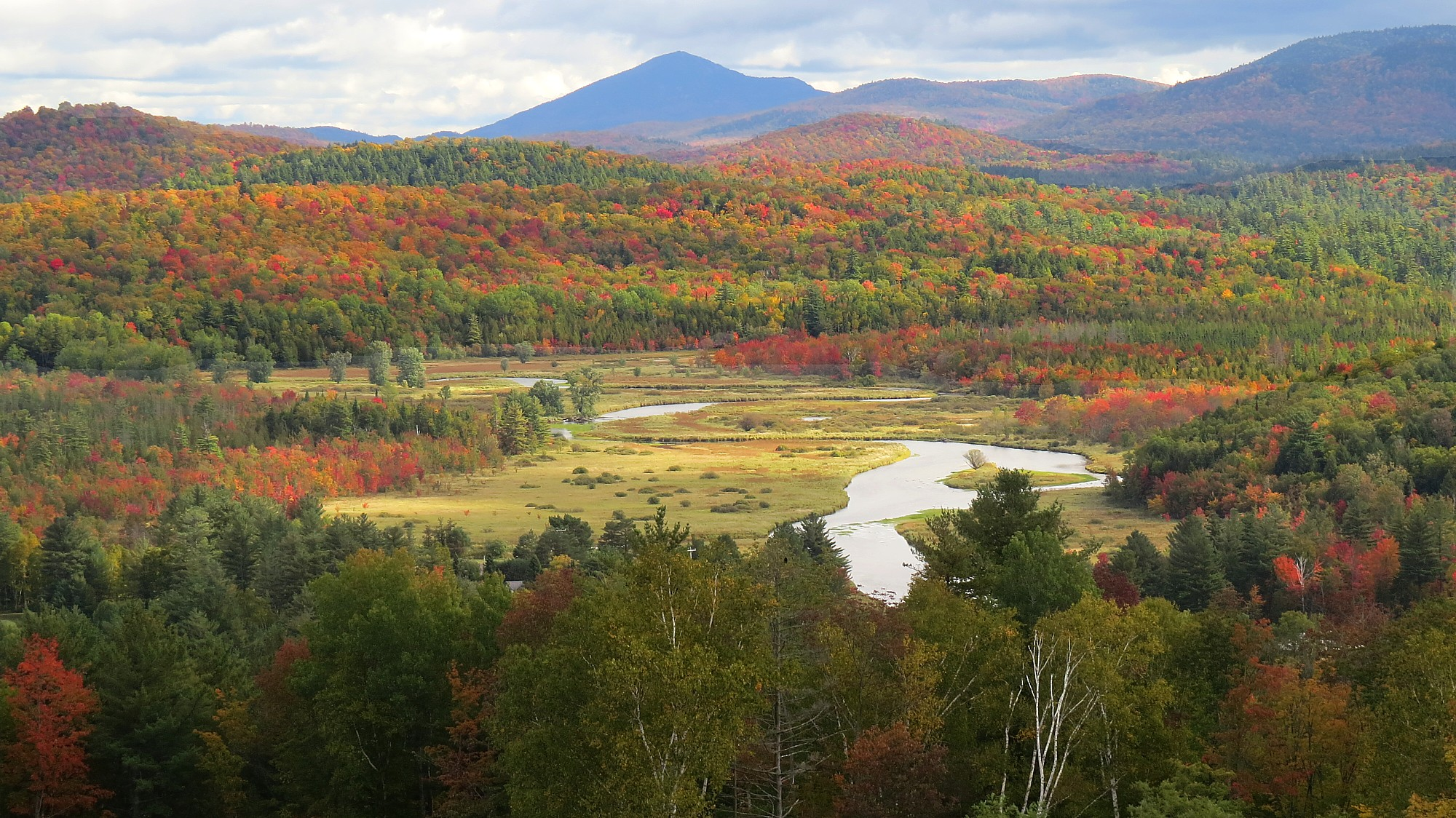
View north from the top of the ski area at Mount Pisgah of the Saranac River valley

In 1952, poet, novelist and short story writer Sylvia Plath broke her leg skiing on Mount Pisgah while visiting her boyfriend, Dick Norton, who was curing at New York State Sanatorium at Ray Brook. She fictionalized this incident in her novel The Bell Jar.
