= Dewey Mountain =

Mountain in New York, United States

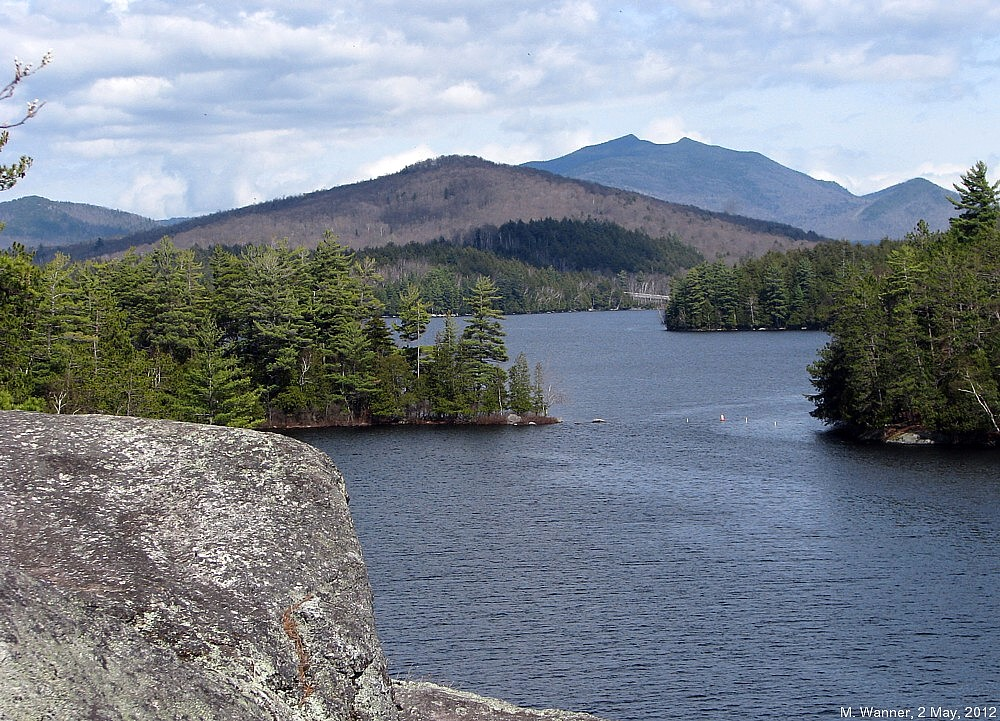
- Dewey Mountain (center), Saranac Lake, New York, from Bluff Island, Lower Saranac Lake. McKenzie Mountain at right

Highest point
- Elevation: 2,090 ft (640 m)
- Coordinates: 44°18′37″N 74°09′06″W

Geography
- Location within New York Adirondack Park Location within the United States
- Location: Franklin County, New York
- Topo map: USGS Saranac Lake

There is another Dewey Mountain in Chittenden County, Vermont

Dewey Mountain is a 2,090-foot-tall (640 m) mountain in Franklin County, New York just south of the village of Saranac Lake. A hill that slopes down to Lake Flower and is a shoulder of Dewey Mountain has been called Blood Hill, Maple Hill, or sometimes Reservoir Hill. It is one of three small mountains surrounding Saranac Lake: the others are Baker Mountain and Mount Pisgah. Dewey Mountain was originally called Ring Hill. Kiwassa Lake Road runs along the eastern side of the hill and the adjacent shoulder of Dewey Mountain. The Dewey Mountain Recreation Center operates a ski center on the west side of the mountain. In the 1920s weekly ski meets were held consisting of ski jumping followed by a cross-country race—early Nordic combined. Competitors would come from around New England, New York City and Montreal. One of the jumps was on Blood Hill, an eastern shoulder of Dewey. In the 1940s there was a downhill ski area on the west side of the mountain served by a rope tow.
