= Barnum Peak =

Mountain in Ross Dependency, Antarctica

- Location within Antarctica

Highest point
- Peak: 2,940 metres (9,650 ft)
- Elevation: 2,940 m (9,650 ft)
- Coordinates: 85°23′S 171°40′W

Naming
- Etymology: J.D. Barnum, publisher of the Syracuse Post-Standard and contributor to a Richard E. Byrd expedition

Geography
- Continent: Antarctica
- Region: Ross Dependency

Climbing
- First ascent: Àlex Simón, Vicente Castro, David Hita, and friend (2003)

Barnum Peak (85°23′S 171°40′W) is a peak, 2,940 metres (9,650 ft) high, surmounting the east end of a prominent snow-covered rock divide near the head of Liv Glacier, just south of the mouth of LaVergne Glacier. It was discovered by Rear Admiral Byrd on the Byrd Antarctic Expedition flight to the South Pole in November 1929, and named by him for J.D. Barnum, publisher of the Syracuse Post-Standard and contributor to the expedition.
