= Igor Zotikov =

Russian glaciologist

Igor Alekseevich Zotikov
- Зотиков, Игорь Алексеевич
- Born: March 7, 1926; Moscow, Russian SFSR, Soviet Union
- Died: August 23, 2010 (aged 84); Moscow, Russia
- Burial place: Vostryakovskoe cemetery
- Education: Doctor of Sciences in Geology
- Alma mater: Moscow Aviation Institute
- Occupations: Glaciologist, polar explorer, academic
- Employer: Russian Academy of Sciences
- Known for: Predicting the existence of fresh water lakes under the Antarctic ice sheet
- Awards: Order of the Badge of Honour; Antarctic Service Medal

Igor Alekseevich Zotikov (Russian: Зотиков, Игорь Алексеевич) (March 7, 1926 – August 23, 2010) was a Russian glaciologist, polar explorer and academic. Zotikov was best known for predicting the existence of fresh water lakes under the Antarctic ice sheet, later to be discovered as Lake Vostok. For his efforts a glacier was named after him, Zotikov Glacier.

== Early life and education ==
Zotikov was born on March 7, 1926, in Moscow. In 1949 Zotikov graduated from the Moscow Aviation Institute as an engineer. Although he wanted to be a test pilot, he did not fly due to near-sightedness.

He received his Doctor of Sciences in geology from the Energy Institute Krzhizhanovsky under the Academy of Sciences of the Soviet Union (Russian Academy of Sciences). Interested in glaciology, he joined the expedition to Antarctica during the International Geophysical Year (IGY) of 1957–1958.

Zotikov wrote his thesis based on the findings from the expedition. The thesis was published in 1963 by the International Association of Hydrological Sciences. Zotikov's thesis discussed the interaction between the ocean and glaciation. Obtaining results from the IGY, regarding thermal physics of large ice sheets, it theoretically showed that in the central part of the ice sheet, there could be continuous melting and freshwater subglacial lakes underneath the Antarctic ice.

Zotikov was not the first scientist to propose the idea of fresh water under the Antarctica's ice sheets. At the end of the 19th century, Peter Kropotkin theorized that the immense weight of ice can cause a significant amount of pressure, which can lower the pressure melting point of the ice sheet's lower parts. As a result, the ice may turn into liquid water.

In 1963 Zotikov wrote his dissertation furthering Kropotkin's theory. His DSc thesis observed that the temperature at the bottom of the ice sheet below Vostok Station is at the melting point of ice and it is located beneath the thickest part of the ice sheet. Zotikov observed that lakes might exist at the ice/rock barrier, and that microorganisms could exist there.

== Career ==
Before Zotikov became a glaciologist, in between college and his postgraduate education, he worked for three years on the heat transfer and thermodynamic problems of designing jet engines. Following that he worked from 1952 until 1958 on the atmospheric entry problems of the first Soviet ballistic missile, the R-7 Semyorka. His work was related to the melting and evaporation of the missile's nose by the heat that was generated re-entering Earth's atmosphere.

After receiving his Doctor of Sciences, Zotikov worked for the Russian Academy of Sciences. During his forty-year career with the academy he spent several years overwintering both at the Russian Vostok Station and United States' McMurdo Station. In 1965, as a Soviet exchange scientist and member of Operation Deep Freeze '65, Zotikov studied the process of freezing and melting at the bottom of the Ross Ice Shelf and collaborated with leading American specialists on deep drilling.

The National Science Foundation invited Zotikov to join the Ross Ice Shelf Project investigating whether freezing or melting occurs at the bottom of the Ross Ice Shelf. He worked on this project from 1972 to 1978 and wrote two papers based on his findings, Thermal Drilling of the Glacier and Antifreeze-thermodrilling for Core Through the Central Part of the Ross Ice Shelf (J-9 Camp), Antarctica. Both papers were published by the Cold Regions Research and Engineering Laboratory.

Confirmation of the existence of Lake Vostok occurred in 1993 by G.P. Ridley (UK) using the European Remote-Sensing Satellite's laser altimetry. A subsequent paper was published in the journal Nature in 1996 co-authored by Zotikov.

In 2003 and 2004 Zotikov received a grant from the Fulbright Foundation for eight months on the project Geographical Study of Lake Vostok in Antarctica. The project was conducted under the direction of Roger Barry who was a director at the National Snow and Ice Data Center of the Cooperative Institute for Research in Environmental Sciences of the University of Colorado Boulder. Zotikov co-authored a paper published in the Journal of Glaciology in 2004 about his findings, The Kolka-Karmadon rock/ice slide of 20 September 2002: An extraordinary event of historical dimensions in North Ossetia, Russian Caucasus.

=== Books ===
Zotikov is the author of two scientific books about his findings in Antarctica. The Thermophysics of Glaciers and The Antarctic Subglacial Lake Vostok: Glaciology, Biology and Planetology, the later summing up his lifetime of scientific papers on the subject.

Zotikov was the first to translate the book The Prophet by Kahlil Gibran into Russian, published by Raduga in 1989. The original publication was in 1923 by Alfred A. Knopf.

In his later years Zotikov wrote several non-fiction books that were self-published in Russia such as I was not looking for a kiwi bird and Picnic on the Appalachian Trail.

== Legacy and death ==
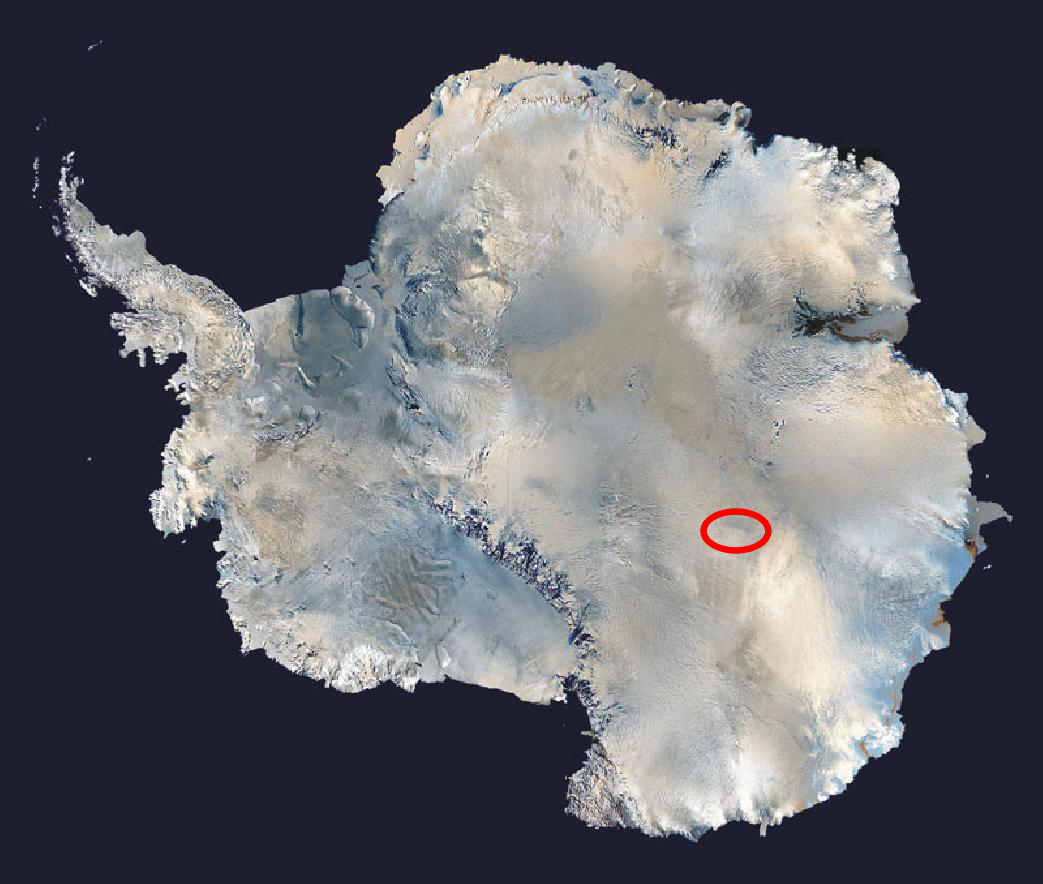
Location of Lake Vostok in East Antarctica

Zotikov was not the first scientist to propose the idea of fresh water under the Antarctica's ice sheets. At the end of the 19th century, Peter Kropotkin theorized that "the tremendous pressure exerted by the cumulative mass of thousands of vertical meters of ice could decrease the melting point at the lowest portions of the ice sheet to the point where the ice would become liquid water".

In 1963 Zotikov wrote his dissertation furthering Kropotkin's theory. His DSc thesis indicated "the temperature at the bottom of the ice sheet below Vostok Station to be at the ice melting point as well as being beneath the thickest part of the ice sheet". It occurred to him that lakes might exist at the ice/rock barrier, and that microorganisms could exist there.

Confirmation of the existence of Lake Vostok occurred in 1993 by G.P. Ridley (UK) using the European Remote-Sensing Satellite's laser altimetry. A subsequent paper was published in the journal Nature in 1996 co-authored by Zotikov.

Zotikov died on August 23, 2010, from Prostate cancer and is buried at the Vostryakovskoe cemetery in Moscow, Russia.

Three years after Zotikov's death, On July 3, 2013, a paper was published titled Subglacial Lake Vostok (Antarctica) Accretion Ice Contains a Diverse Set of Sequences from Aquatic, Marine and Sediment-Inhabiting Bacteria and Eukarya in the PLOS One journal by the Public Library of Science, confirming there is life in Lake Vostok.

== Recognition and awards ==
- Two Order of the Badge of Honour
- Antarctic Service Medal
- Zotikov Glacier namesake
- Gratitude of the President of the Russian Federation

== Publications ==
=== Books ===
- The Thermophysics of Glaciers (1986)
- The Prophet (Russian translation) (1989) ^{note}
- The Antarctic Subglacial Lake Vostok: Glaciology, Biology and Planetology (2006)

==== Self published books ====
Self-published books by Zotikov

===== Non-fiction =====
- 460 days in the Fourth Soviet Antarctic Expedition (Russian: 460 дней в Четвертой Советской антарктической экспедиции)
- Year of the American polar explorers (Russian: Год у американских полярников)
- Unraveling the mysteries of the icy continent (Russian: Разгадка тайн ледяного континента)
- Winter Soldiers (Russian: Зимние солдаты)

===== Fiction =====
- I was not looking for a kiwi bird (Russian: Я искал не птицу киви)
- Picnic on the Appalachian Trail (Russian: Пикник на Аппалачской тропе)
- Royal Musketeers (Russian: Королевские мушкетёры)
- Sex without borders (Russian: Секс без границ)
- Captain Flint's Gold (Russian: Золото капитана Флинта)
- Assassin's Remorse (Russian: Раскаяние наёмного убийцы)
- Exorcist and Prince of Darkness (Russian: Экзорцист и Принц Тьмы)
- War of Two Worlds 2. Battle on Earth (Russian: Война двух миров 2. Битва на Земле)
- Return shot Rook (Russian: Ответный выстрел Грача)
- Exorcist and Fire God (Russian: Экзорцист и Огненный бог)
- The story of the Jester' (Russian: История про шута)

=== Scientific publications ===
- Bottom melting in the central zone of the ice shield of the Antarctic continent and its influence upon the present balance of the ice mass (1963). International Association of Hydrological Sciences
- The Thermal and Compositional Structure of the Koettlitz Ice Tongue, McMurdo Sound, Antarctica (1966). International Conference on Low Temperature Science; Conference on Physics of Snow and Ice; Conference on Cryobiology.
- Thermal Drilling of the Glacier (1974). Cold Regions Research and Engineering Laboratory for the National Science Foundation
- Antifreeze-thermodrilling for Core Through the Central Part of the Ross Ice Shelf (J-9 Camp), Antarctica (1979). Cold Regions Research and Engineering Laboratory for the National Science Foundation
- Core Drilling Through the Ross Ice Shelf (Antarctica) Confirmed Basal Freezing (1980). Science
- Large deep freshwater lake beneath the ice of central East Antarctica (1996). Nature
- The Kolka-Karmadon rock/ice slide of 20 September 2002: An extraordinary event of historical dimensions in North Ossetia, Russian Caucasus (2004). Journal of Glaciology

== Notes ==
a. Zotikov was the first to translate the book The Prophet by Kahlil Gibran into Russian, published by Raduga in 1989. The original publication was in 1923 by Alfred A. Knopf.
