= List of peaks named Baker Mountain =

Mountain summits in the United States named Baker Mountain:

Name	USGS link	State	County	USGS map	Elevation	
Baker Mountain		Arizona	Gila	Aztec Peak	7,572 ft	2,308 m
Baker Mountain		Arizona	Gila	Reno Pass	4,042 ft	1,232 m
Baker Mountain		Arkansas	Polk	Eagle Mountain	1,978 ft	603 m
Baker Mountain		Colorado	Clear Creek	Grays Peak	12,398 ft	3,779 m
Baker Mountain		Colorado	Park	Eagle Rock	9,511 ft	2,899 m
Baker Mountain		Colorado	Grand	Rabbit Ears Peak	9,819 ft	2,993 m
Baker Mountain		Colorado	Grand	Mount Richthofen	12,346 ft	3,763 m
Baker Mountain		California	Fresno	Tucker Mountain	2,835 ft	864 m
Baker Mountain		Georgia	Lumpkin	Neels Gap	3,540 ft	1,080 m
Baker Mountain		Maine	Somerset	Bingham	787 ft	240 m
Baker Mountain		Maine	Piscataquis	Number Four Mountain	3,527 ft	1,075 m
Baker Mountain		Maine	Cumberland	North Windham	489 ft	149 m
Baker Mountain		Montana	Park	McLeod Basin	7,293 ft	2,223 m
Baker Mountain		New York	Essex	McKenzie Mountain	2,441 ft	744 m
Baker Mountain		North Carolina	Catawba	Longview	1,739 ft	530 m
Baker Mountain		Oklahoma	Latimer	Baker Mountain	1,906 ft	581 m
Baker Mountain		Tennessee	White	Sparta	1,562 ft	476 m
Baker Mountain		Tennessee	Van Buren	Welchland	1,818 ft	554 m
Mount Baker		Alaska	Sitka	Sitka D-7	1,968 ft	600 m
Baker Mountain		Utah	Box Elder	Russian Knoll	5,528 ft	1,685 m
Baker Mountain		Virginia	Prince Edward	Madisonville	699 ft	213 m
Mount Baker		Washington	Whatcom	Mount Baker	10,420 ft	3,180 m
Baker Mountain		Washington	Okanogan	Keystone	3,353 ft	1,022 m
Baker Mountain		West Virginia	Hampshire	Yellow Spring	2,047 ft	624 m
