= Gabbro Hills =

Hills in Antarctica

- Location within Antarctica

Highest point
- Elevation: 1,500 m (4,900 ft)

Geography
- Continent: Antarctica
- Area: Marie Byrd Land
- Range coordinates: 84°42′S 173°0′W

The Gabbro Hills (84°42′S 173°0′W) are a group of rugged ridges and coastal hills which border the Antarctic Ross Ice Shelf between Barrett Glacier and Gough Glacier and extend south to Ropebrake Pass. They were so named by the Southern Party of the New Zealand Geological Survey Antarctic Expedition (NZGSAE) (1963–64) because of the prevalence of gabbro, a dark, plutonic rock, in the area.

== Location ==
The Gabbro Hills lie to the north of the Prince Olav Mountains in the Queen Maud Mountains, east of Barrett Glacier, north of the Ross Ice Shelf and northwest of the Holzrichter Glacier and Gough Glacier. Watt Ridge, which terminates in Mount Llano to the southeast, defines the limit of the Prince Olav Mountains along the southern edge of the range. To the north of these are Ropebreak Pass, Amphibole Peak, Mount Baker, Polaris Peak, Mount Roth. Mount Justman and Olliver Peak. The Sage Nunataks are to the north.

== Features ==
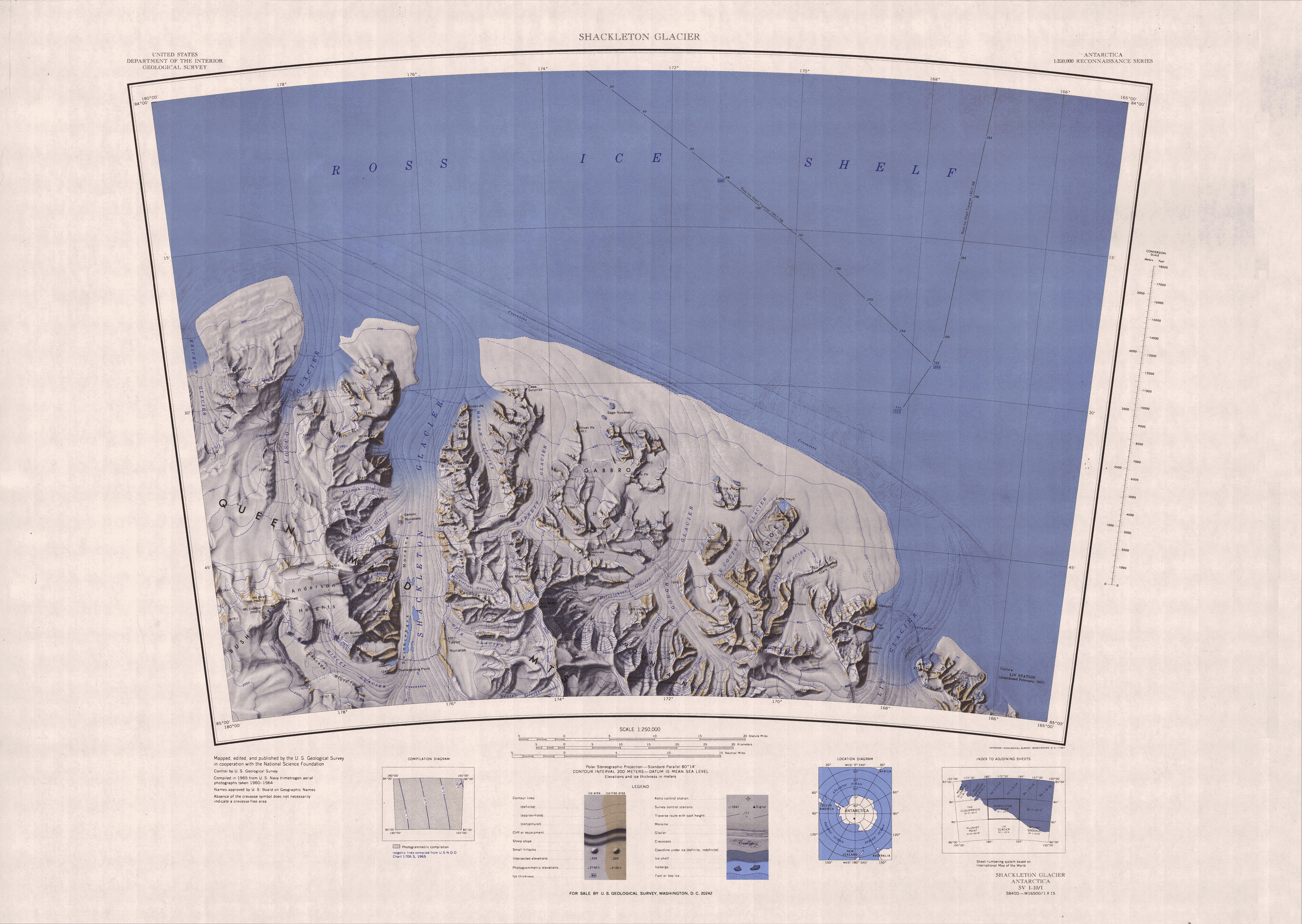
Gabbro Hills in south center of map

Features, from south to north, include:

=== Ropebrake Pass ===
84°45′S 173°25′W. A steep, narrow snow pass between the south end of Gabbro Hills and Mount Llano, permitting passage between the Barrett and Gough Glaciers. So named by the Southern Party of NZGSAE (1963-64) because of the large number of rope brakes used in its crossing.

=== Amphibole Peak ===
84°44′S 173°26′W. The highest peak in the Gabbro Hills, 1,660 metres (5,450 ft) high, standing 4 nautical miles (7.4 km; 4.6 mi) north of Mount Llano. So named by the Southern Party of NZGSAE (1963-64) because minerals of the Amphibole group were found on the peak.

=== Mount Baker ===
84°44′S 172°21′W. A mountain, 1,480 metres (4,860 ft) high, in the southeast part of Gabbro Hills near the edge of the Ross Ice Shelf, standing at the west side of Gough Glacier, 6 nautical miles (11 km; 6.9 mi) east of Amphibole Peak. Discovered by the U.S. Ross Ice Shelf Traverse Party (1957-58) under A.P. Crary, and named for Gladys E. Baker, who assisted in analyzing, classifying and reporting upon lichens for the ByrdAE (1933-35).

=== Polaris Peak ===
84°39′S 172°40′W. A rounded peak 970 metres (3,180 ft) high rising 4 nautical miles (7.4 km; 4.6 mi) southwest of Mount Roth in the Gabbro Hills. So named by the Southern Party of NZGSAE (1963-64) because they drove a Polaris motor toboggan to the summit.

=== Mount Roth ===
84°35′S 172°22′W. A rock peak 870 metres (2,850 ft) high located 3 nautical miles (5.6 km; 3.5 mi) east of Mount Justman in the northeast corner of Gabbro Hills, near the edge of the Ross Ice Shelf. Discovered and photographed by the Byrd Antarctic Expedition (1928-30) and named for Benjamin Roth, mechanic and U.S. Army representative on that expedition.

=== Mount Justman ===
84°35′S 172°56′W. A mountain 740 metres (2,430 ft) high along the edge of Ross Ice Shelf, standing in the north part of Gabbro Hills, midway between Olliver Peak and Mount Roth. Named by US-ACAN for Lt. Cdr. L.G. Justman, United States Navy, Assistant Ship Operations Officer on the Staff of the Commander, U.S. Naval Support Force, Antarctica, 1964.

=== Olliver Peak ===
84°34′S 173°33′W. A rock peak 630 metres (2,070 ft) high along the edge of Ross Ice Shelf. It stands at the east side of the mouth of Barrett Glacier and is the northwesternmost summit in Gabbro Hills. Named by US-ACAN for Cdr. George R. Olliver, United States Navy, who was injured in the crash of an Otter aircraft on Dec. 22, 1955, following a take-off from near Cape Bird.

=== Sage Nunataks ===
84°33′S 173°00′W. Two ice-free nunataks, 1 nautical mile (1.9 km; 1.2 mi) apart, located at the edge of the Ross Ice Shelf just north of Mount Justman and the Gabbro Hills. Named by US-ACAN for Richard H. Sage, builder, United States Navy, a member of the winter party at Byrd Station in 1959 and the South Pole Station in 1964.

== Sources ==
- Alberts, Fred G., ed. (1995), Geographic Names of the Antarctic (PDF) (2 ed.), United States Board on Geographic Names This article incorporates public domain material from websites or documents of the United States Board on Geographic Names.
- Shackleton Glacier, USGS: United States Geological Survey
- This article incorporates public domain material from websites or documents of the United States Geological Survey.
