= Baker Mountain (New York) =

Mountain in the Adirondacks

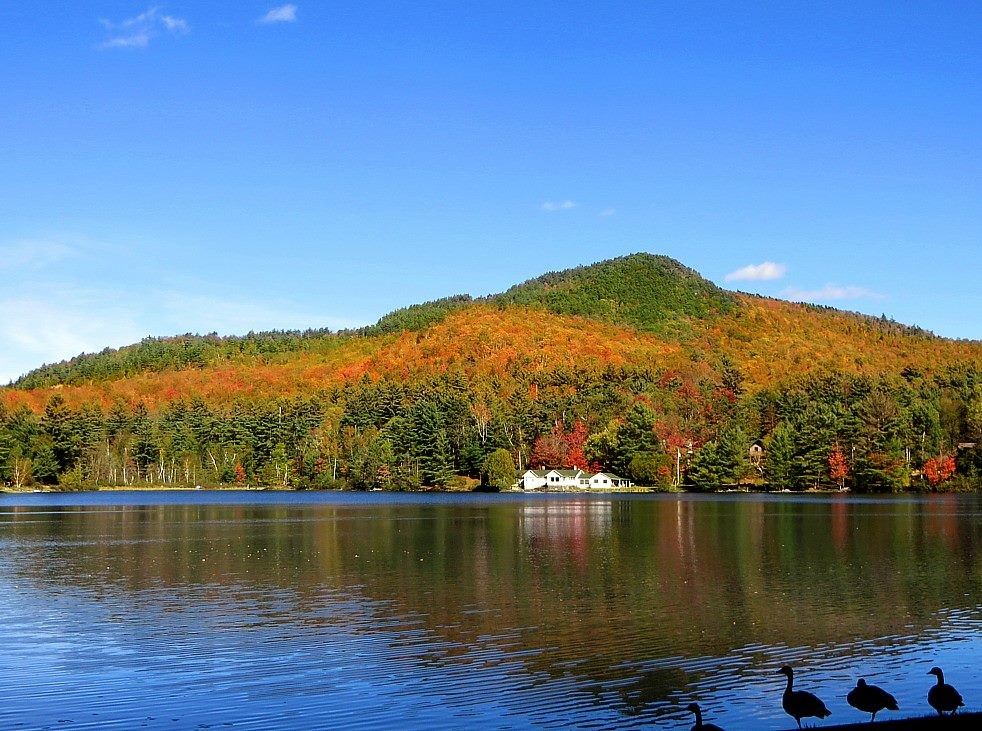
- Baker Mountain rising above Moody Pond, Saranac Lake, New York

Highest point
- Elevation: 2,454 ft (748 m)
- Coordinates: 44°20′6″N 74°6′13″W

Geography
- Location within New York Adirondack Park Location within the United States
- Location: Essex County, New York, United States
- Parent range: Adirondacks
- Topo map: USGS McKenzie Mountain

Climbing
- Easiest route: Hike

Baker Mountain is a 2,454-foot-tall (748 m) mountain in Essex County, New York east of Saranac Lake. It is part of the McKenzie Mountain Wilderness Area. The trail to the top is about 0.9 miles (1.4 km) long; the hike is part of the "Saranac Sixer". Moody Pond lies at its foot.

It is one of three small mountains surrounding Saranac Lake: the others are Mount Pisgah and Dewey Mountain.

There were major forest fires on Baker in 1903 and 1908.

The first recorded ascent of Baker Mountain on skis was made by Edwin R. Stonaker on March 11, 1916.

In the prohibition era, the Mt. Baker Club was a speakeasy at the foot of the mountain.
