= Baker Mountain (ski area) =

Ski area in Moscow, Maine

- Interactive map of Baker Mountain
- Location: Moscow, Maine, United States
- Nearest major city: Waterville, Maine
- Coordinates: 45°5′5″N 69°54′20″W
- Top elevation: 767 feet (234 m)
- Base elevation: 540 feet (160 m)
- Trails: 5
- Lift system: 1

Baker Mountain is a small community ski area located in Moscow, Maine. It consists of five runs (3 beginner and 2 intermediate) and a T-bar lift. The ski area is on the southern end of Pierce Hill (el. 1,310 ft or 400 m), just north of its namesake, Baker Mountain (el. 780 ft or 240 m) It was started in 1930 by Allen Quimby Jr.

Baker Mountain is run by its pass holders, who volunteer their time. During school vacations the club operates a ski school.

== History ==
In the 1930s Allen Quimby Jr., operated a veneer mill in Bingham. An avid skier, Quimby put in the first rope tow at Baker Mountain; by the 1940s a second tow was installed. In 1968 the rope tows were removed and a T-bar was installed to bring skiers to the top of the open slope.
