= USS Paul G. Baker =

USS Paul G. Baker has been the name of more than one United States Navy ship, and may refer to:

- USS Paul G. Baker (DE-755), a destroyer escort cancelled in 1944
- USS Paul G. Baker (DE-642), a destroyer escort in commission from 1944 to 1947
