= Bakers, Tennessee =

Neighborhood in Nashville, Tennessee

Coordinates: 36°22′20″N 86°45′36″W

Bakers is a neighborhood in Nashville, Davidson County, Tennessee, in the United States.

== History ==
Bakers was historically known as Bakers Station and Baker. A post office was established as Bakers Station in 1875, renamed Baker in 1882, and remained in operation until it was discontinued in 1922. The community was named for a member of the Baker family, the original owner of the town site.
