= Baker Peak (Nevada) =

Mountain in Nevada, United States

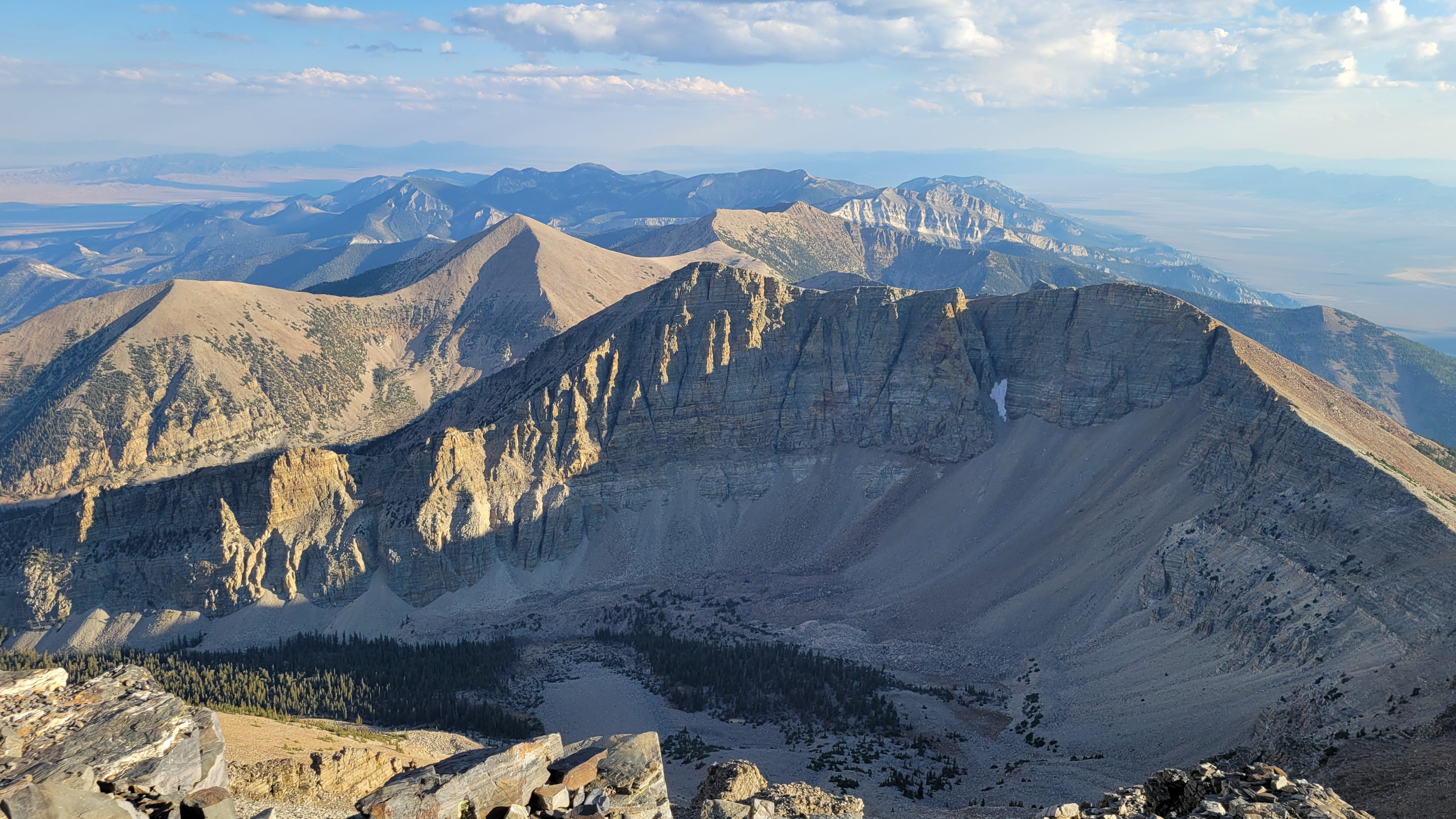
- North aspect, centered

Highest point
- Elevation: 12,303 ft (3,750 m)
- Prominence: 492 ft (150 m)
- Parent peak: Wheeler Peak
- Isolation: 0.98 mi (1.58 km)
- Coordinates: 38°58′11″N 114°19′02″W

Geography
- Location within Nevada Location within the United States
- Interactive map of Baker Peak
- Country: United States
- State: Nevada
- County: White Pine
- Protected area: Great Basin National Park
- Parent range: Snake Range; Great Basin Ranges
- Topo map: USGS Wheeler Peak

Geology
- Rock age: Cambrian
- Rock type: Quartzite

Climbing
- Easiest route: class 2

Baker Peak is a mountain in White Pine County, Nevada, United States.

== Description ==
Baker Peak is a 12,303-foot-elevation (3,750-meter) summit set in the Snake Range and Great Basin National Park. It is the fourth-highest summit in the state of Nevada. The mountain has two peaks: the 12,303-ft east peak and a 12,297-ft west peak which are 0.43 mile (0.69 km) apart. Precipitation runoff from the mountain drains west into Spring Creek and east into Baker Creek, which both end in the Great Basin where it evaporates or sinks underground — i.e., it is endorheic as no water reaches the ocean. Topographic relief is significant as the summit rises 1,700 feet (518 meters) above Baker Lake in one mile (1.6 km), and 6,400 feet (1,951 meters) above Spring Valley in six miles (9.7 km). The nearest higher peak is Wheeler Peak, one mile (1.6 km) to the north. The mountain's toponym has been officially adopted by the United States Board on Geographic Names. The Baker name refers to the nearby town of Baker, Nevada, which is named after an early settler, George W. Baker.

== Climate ==
Baker Peak is set within the Great Basin Desert which has hot summers and cold winters. The desert is an example of a cold desert climate as the desert's elevation makes temperatures cooler than lower elevation deserts. Due to the high elevation and aridity, temperatures drop sharply after sunset. Summer nights are comfortably cool. Winter highs are generally above freezing, and winter nights are bitterly cold, with temperatures often dropping well below freezing.

== Gallery ==
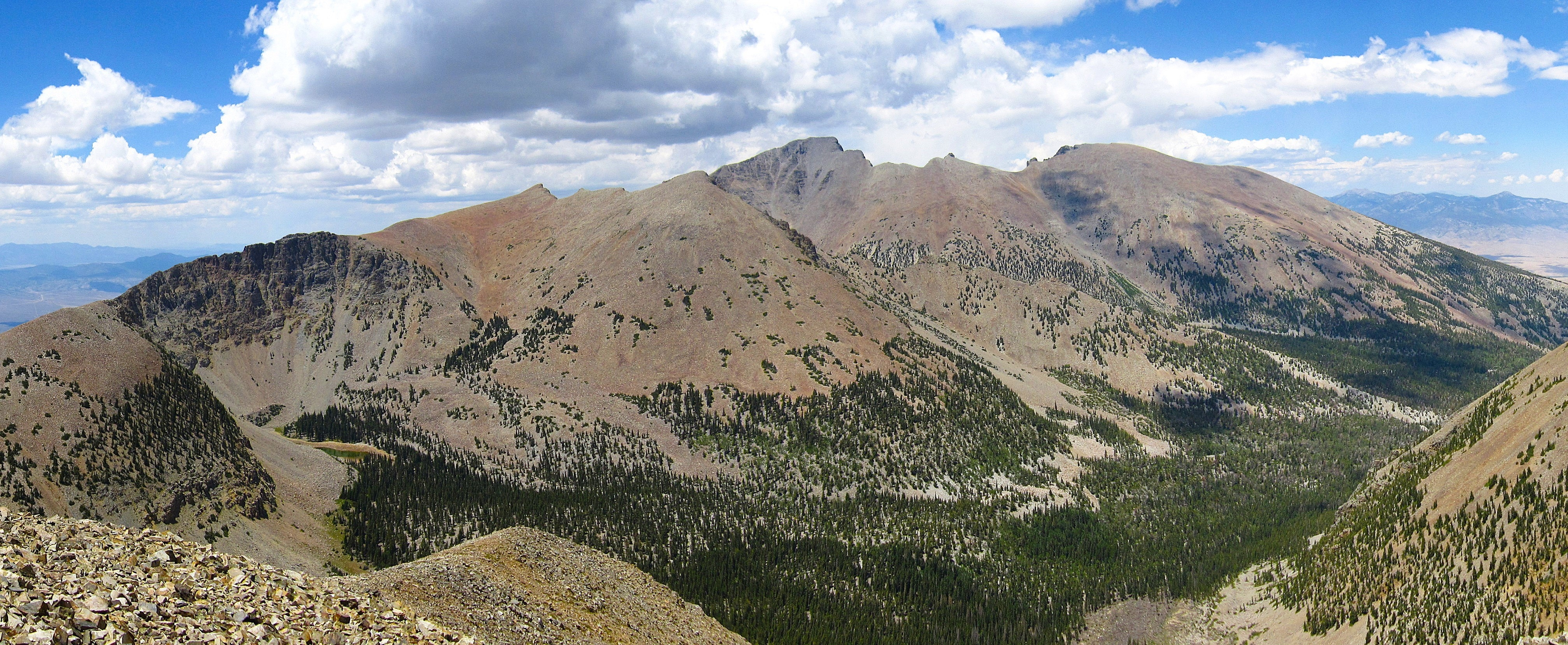
Baker Peak and Wheeler Peak viewed from southeast

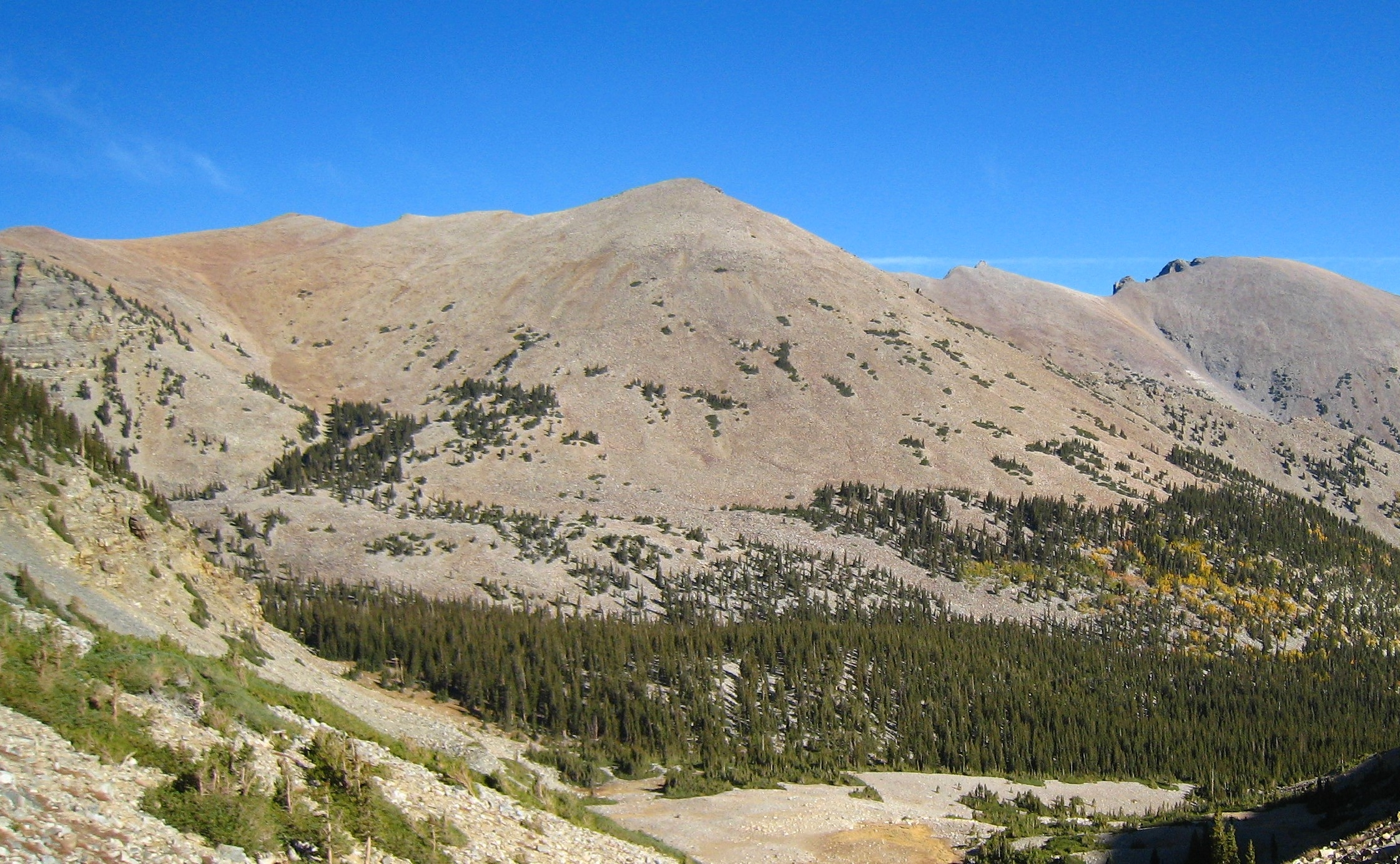
South aspect

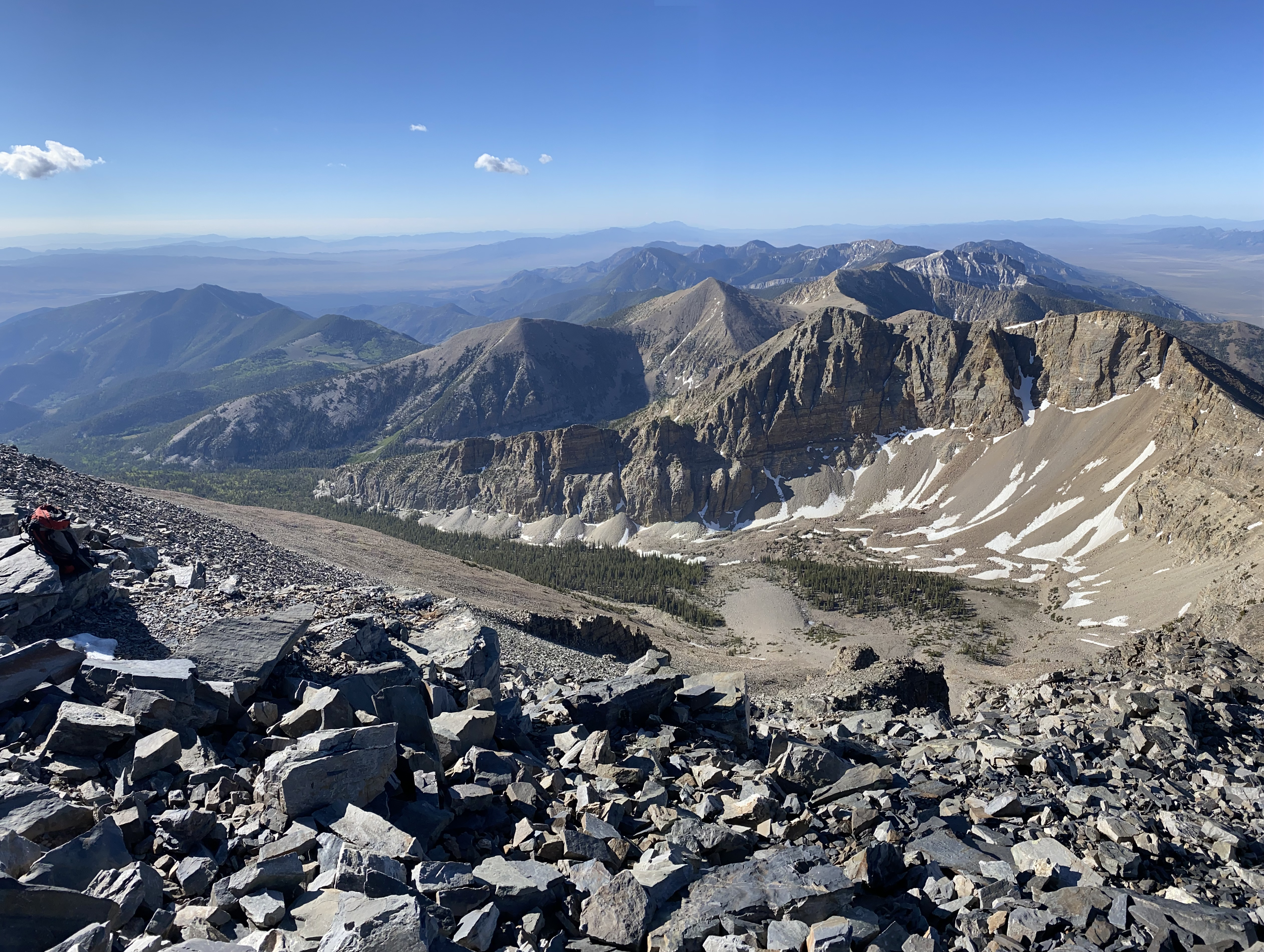
Baker Peak (right of center) viewed from Wheeler Peak

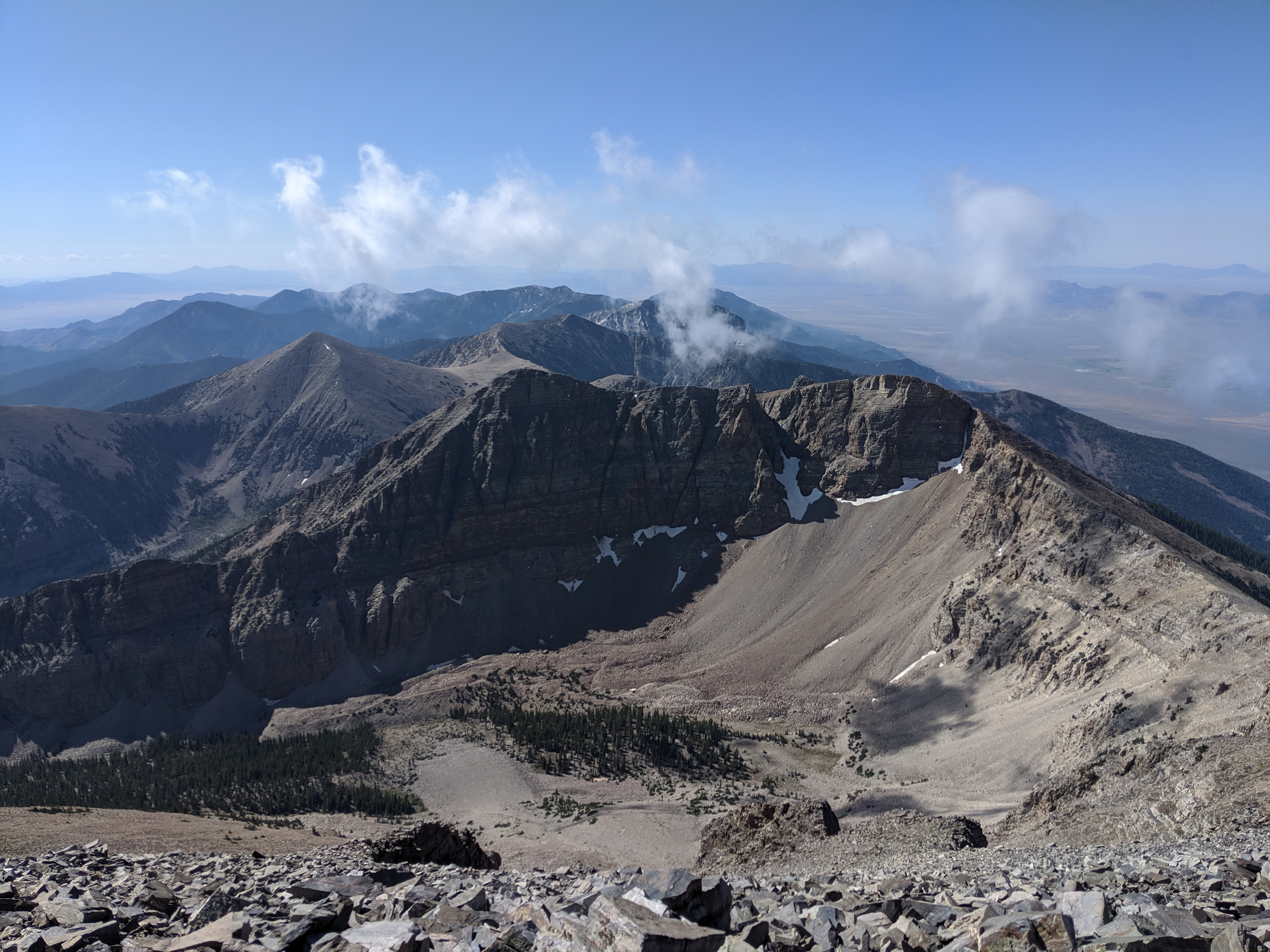
Baker Peak viewed from Wheeler Peak

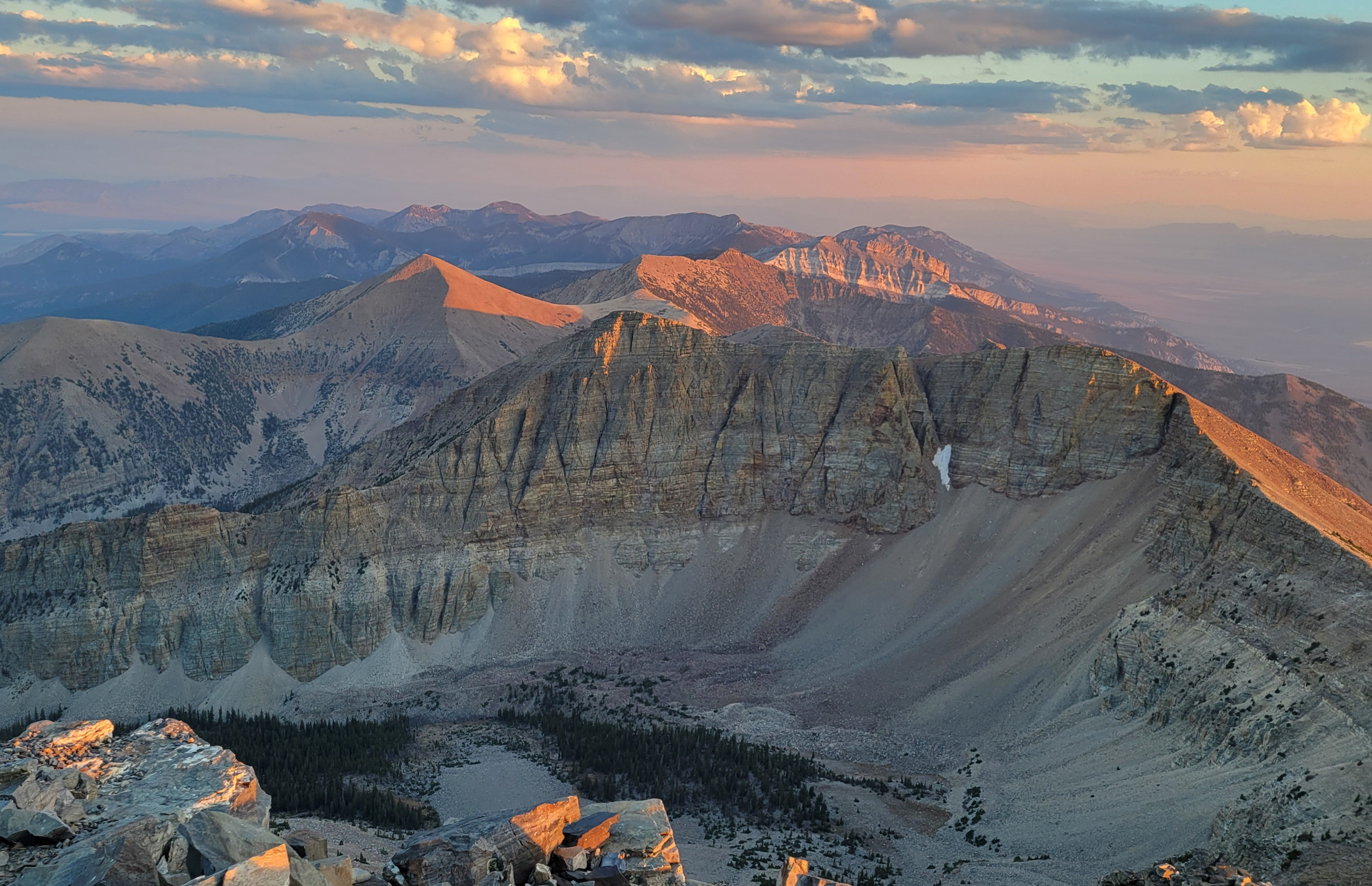
Baker Peak viewed from Wheeler Peak

== See also ==
- List of mountain peaks of Nevada
