= Baker (military code-name) =

Baker is the code-name for a series of training exercises conducted by the United States Army and several Asian countries which hosted the exercises. The purpose of the exercises is to practice and develop counter-narcotics operations.

Some of the operations in this series include:

- Baker Blade: Classified exercise.
- Baker Mint: Conducted by the US Army and Malaysia in 1997.
- Baker Mint 99-1: Conducted by the US Army and Malaysia in 1999. Trained on military intelligence and photo-surveillance.
- Baker Mint Lens 99: Conducted by the US Army and Malaysia in 1999.
- Baker Mondial V: Conducted by the US Army and Mongolia in 1997. Trained on medical procedures.
- Baker Mongoose II: Conducted by the US Army and Mongolia in 1995.
- Baker Piston Lens 2000: Conducted by the US Army and the Philippines in 2000.
- Baker Tepid: A series of eight exercises conducted by the US Army and Thailand.
- Baker Torch: A series of three exercises conducted by the US Army and Thailand from 1999 to 2001. Trained on border control.
- Baker Torch Lens: Conducted by the US Army and Thailand. Trained on diving.
