= Bahlu =

Bahlu بهلو
- Village
- Location within Iran
- Coordinates: 30°09′11″N 51°35′04″E
- Country: Iran
- Province: Fars
- County: Mamasani
- Bakhsh: Central
- Rural District: Javid-e Mahuri

Population (2006)
  - Total: 154
- Time zone: UTC+3:30 (IRST)
  - Summer (DST): UTC+4:30 (IRDT)

Bahlu (Persian: بهلو, also Romanized as Bahlū; also known as Baker and Darreh Bahlū) is a village in Javid-e Mahuri Rural District, in the Central District of Mamasani County, Fars province, Iran. At the 2006 census, its population was 154, in 38 families.
