= Baker's Drive-Thru =

Fast-food restaurant of Southern California

Baker's Burgers, Inc.

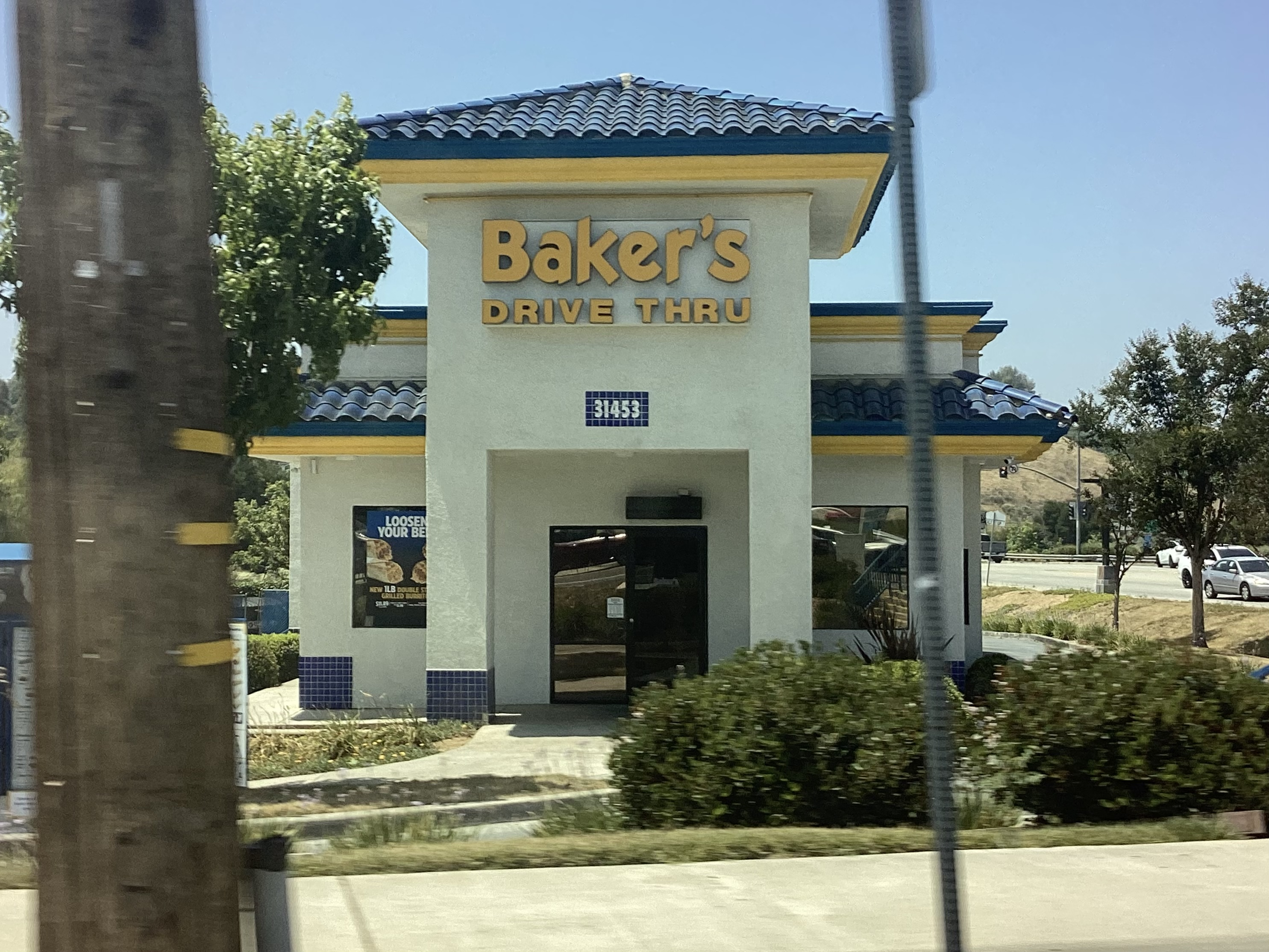
- A Baker's at Yucaipa, California
- Formerly: Baker's Drive-Thru
- Type: Private
- Industry: Fast-food
- Founded: 1952; 74 years ago
- Founder: Neal T. Baker
- Headquarters: San Bernardino, California, United States
- Number of locations: 39
- Area served: Inland Empire, Victorville - Hesperia
- Owner: Carol Baker (deceased 2017)
- Website: bakersdrivethru.com

Baker's Burgers, Inc., doing business as Baker's Drive-Thru, is a chain of fast-food restaurants in the Inland Empire region of Southern California. The menu combines both American fast food and Mexican specialties. It features hamburgers, french fries, tacos, burritos, quesadillas, and milkshakes. A breakfast menu and vegetarian menu are also available at most locations.

All Baker's locations are in San Bernardino County and Riverside County, California. Three stores are located in the Victorville - Hesperia area of Northern San Bernardino County. The corporate offices are on Riverwalk Parkway in Riverside.

== History ==
=== Neal and Carol Baker ===
Inspired by the success of McDonald's, Neal Baker founded his first restaurant in San Bernardino in 1952; 74 years ago. He called it "Baker's Burgers." (San Bernardino was also the location of the first McDonald's.) Three years later, Baker added Mexican food to the menu. Burgers were sold at one window and Mexican food at another. He called this the "Twin Kitchen" concept.

A second store was opened in Rialto the following year. As of 2023, there are 39 Baker's Drive-Thru locations. Upon the death of Neal Baker, his widow Carol took over control of the privately held company. She died in 2017, leaving the second generation of Bakers in charge.

=== Legal problems ===
After struggling for over 30 years to make Baker’s a success, Baker hired Joe Amlani in 1986 to conduct a complete overhaul on the concept and establish their operations as they exist today. Shortly after Carol Baker’s passing in 2017, Amlani was let go while under contract. Amlani pursued legal action in San Bernardino County Superior Court.

After the Baker children took over, they appointed Jason Talley as their new CEO, nephew of Neil and Carol Baker's son-in-law Terry Talley. Jason tried adamantly to not pay what Amlani said he was owed on his contract and tried to invoke ERISA preemption in Federal Court. That motion was brought to Central District in California in early 2018. The Baker Family's motion was denied and the case was sent back to Superior Court of San Bernardino. After months of delays, the courts finally settled the case and sided with Amlani.

=== New menu items ===
In 1995, Baker's began adding a vegetarian menu to locations, originally called the Loma Linda Kitchen menu due to the prevalence of vegetarians in Loma Linda. Seventh-day Adventists, who are traditionally vegetarian, comprise about half the population of Loma Linda.

The first two locations that featured this menu were in Loma Linda and Yucaipa. The vegetarian menu has since been added to most locations.

=== Charities ===
Baker's Drive-Thru restaurants are involved in the Inland Empire through charities and civic works. According to its website, the company has contributed more than $3 million to Easter Seals of Southern California. Baker's also supports the Children's Fund, high school sports and university programs.

In May 2013, the Baker Family Learning Center was opened in Muscoy, on land that Neal Baker donated. It houses a public library and pre-school.

== See also ==
- List of hamburger restaurants
