= Baker Island (disambiguation) =

Baker Island is an uninhabited atoll just north of the equator in the central Pacific Ocean.

Baker Island may also refer to:

- Baker Island (Alaska), an island in the Alexander Archipelago of southeastern Alaska, US
- Baker Island (British Columbia), an island in the Broughton Archipelago, Canada
- Baker Island (Maine), an island in the Town of Cranberry Isles, Maine, US
- Baker Island (Pennsylvania), an alluvial island in Forest County, Pennsylvania, US
- Baker Island (West Virginia), a former island on the Ohio River in Hancock County, West Virginia, US
- Baker Island in McDougall Sound, Qikiqtaaluk, Nunavut, Canada

== See also ==
- Bakers Island, a private residential island in Massachusetts Bay, in Salem, Massachusetts, US
- Baker's Island, an island in Langstone Harbour, Hampshire, England
