= Baker, Illinois =

- Unincorporated community
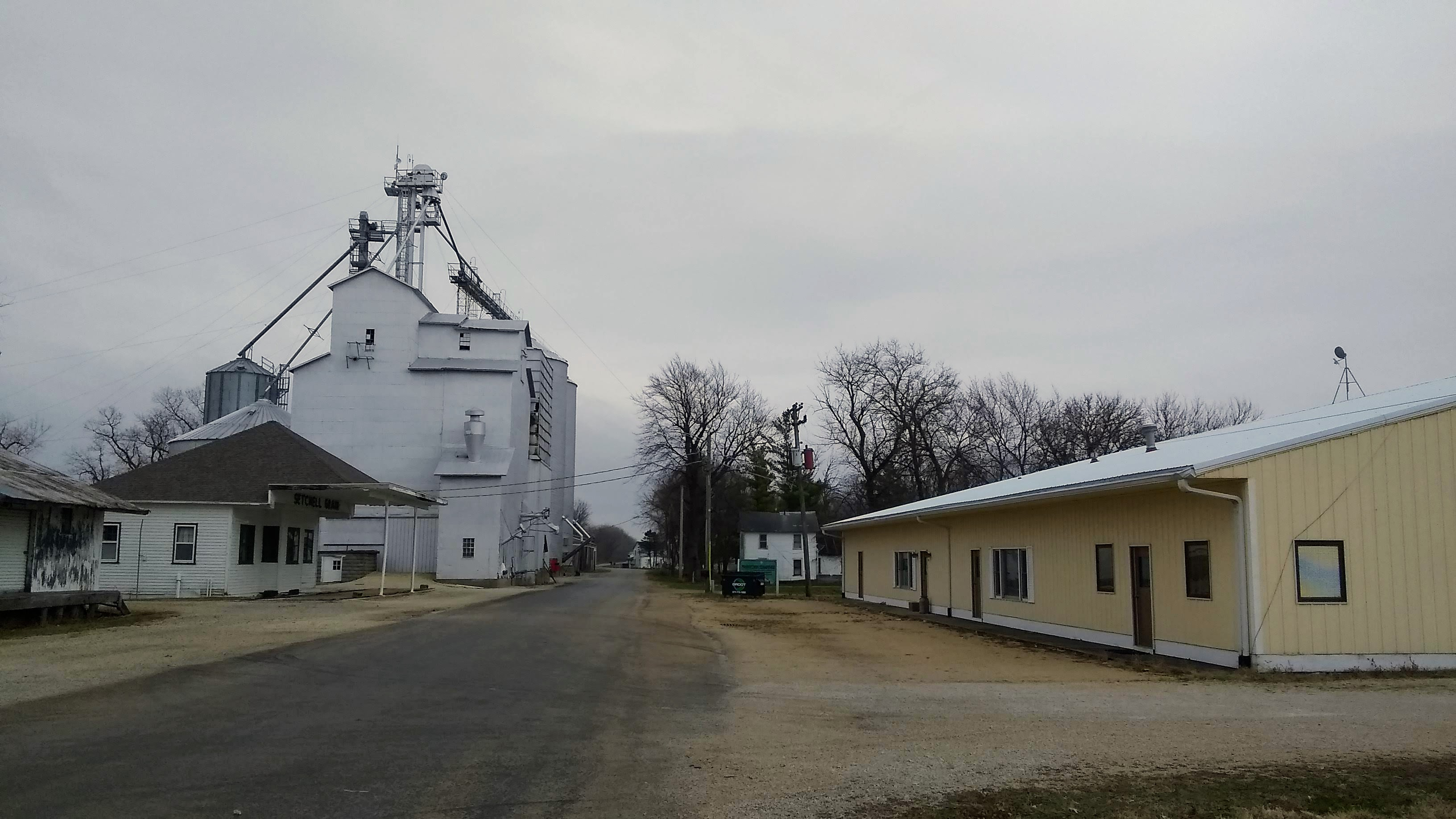
- N 4253rd Rd

- Location within Illinois Location within the United States
- Coordinates: 41°33′20″N 88°48′40″W
- Country: United States
- State: Illinois
- County: LaSalle
- Township: Adams
- Elevation: 673 ft (205 m)
- Time zone: UTC-6 (Central (CST))
  - Summer (DST): UTC-5 (CDT)
- Area codes: 815 & 779
- GNIS feature ID: 403816

Baker is an unincorporated community in Adams Township, LaSalle County, Illinois, United States. Baker is located near Illinois Route 23, 4 miles (6.4 km) south of Leland.
