= Baker River =

Baker River may refer to one of the following rivers:

In Canada:

- Baker River (New Brunswick)

In Chile:

- Baker River (Chile)

In the United States:

- Baker River (New Hampshire)
- Baker River (Washington)
