= John Holzrichter =

John F. Holzrichter
- Education: PhD
- Alma mater: University of Wisconsin; Stanford University; University of Heidelberg
- Occupation: Physicist

John F. Holzrichter is an American physicist, formerly the President of the Hertz Foundation, and currently a Fellow of the American Association for the Advancement of Science.

== Education ==
Holzrichter received a BS with honors in applied mathematics and engineering physics from the University of Wisconsin in 1964. He then received an MS in applied mathematics as a Fulbright Fellow at the University of Heidelberg in 1965 and PhD in physics from Stanford University in 1971. Between 1969 and 1971, he held a Hertz Foundation Fellowship. During his career he constructed the first dye laser at Stanford to photo-induce magnetic signals in the anti-ferromagnetic MnFe.

== Career ==
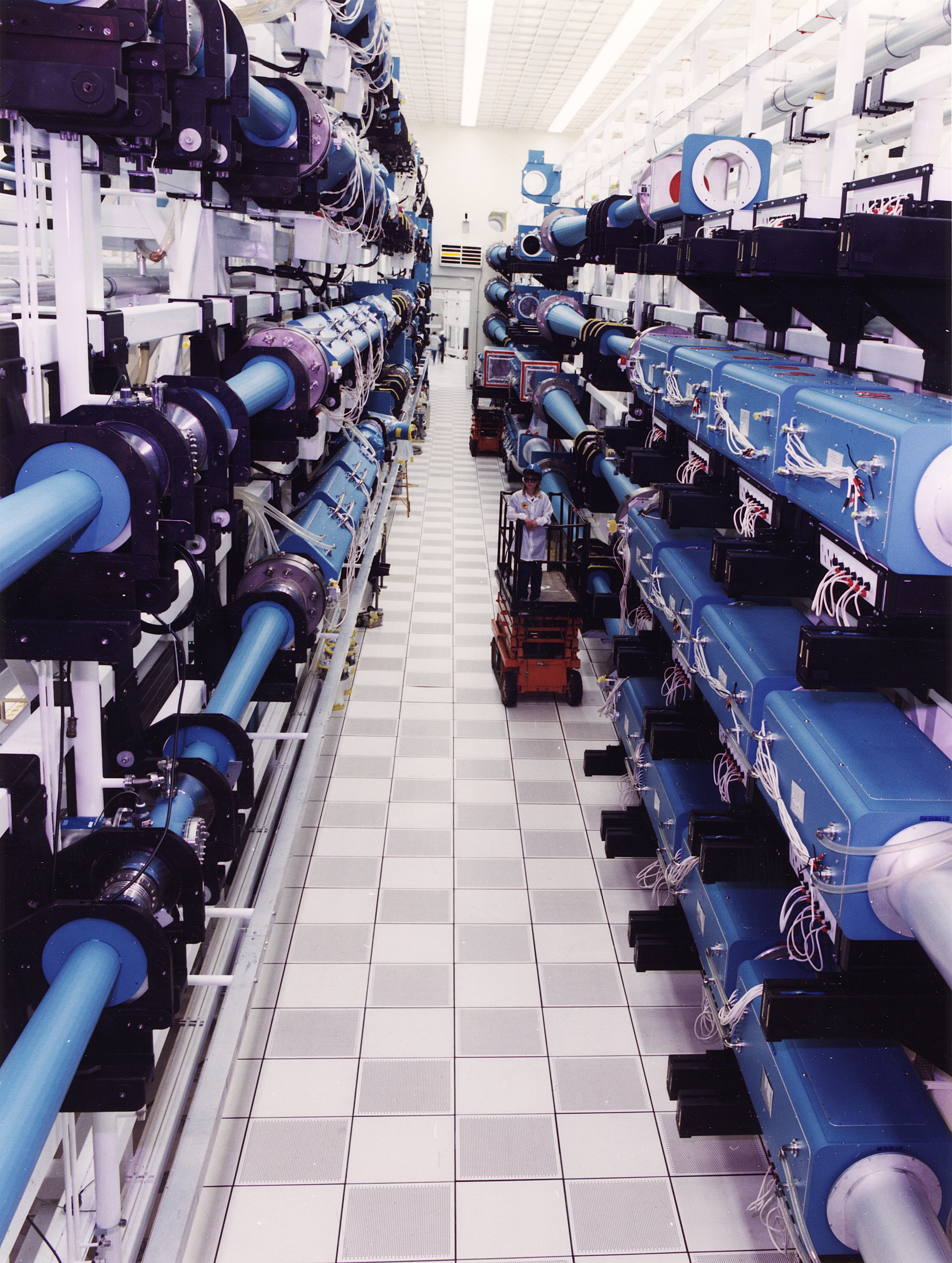
Nova laser at the Lawrence Livermore National Laboratory

Holzrichter began his career at the Naval Research Laboratory in 1971, and moved to LLNL in 1972. Holzrichter served as the deputy director of ICF and fusion lasers, and then director of the Lawrence Livermore National Laboratory's institutional research and development program, He remains at LLNL as senior scientist. His work has included research into lasers for inertial confinement ICF fusion. He played a major role in the design and construction of the Shiva, Novette, Nova, and NIF Laser systems. His research has also included speech recognition and research management. He developed a new program for the Directors of LLNL to use for investing in new technologies (known as LDRD). He is the co-inventor of radar-acoustic speech recognition.

As an educator, Holzrichter has been a research professor at the University of California at Davis. He also holds ten patents. He is a Fellow of the American Association for the Advancement of Science. Between 1999 and 2009, he served as the president of the Fannie and John Hertz Foundation, when he retired as emeritus president. Holzrichter has authored book chapters and papers in journals including Physical Review Letters, Nature and the Proceedings of the National Academy of Sciences.
