= The Baker (Indianapolis, Indiana) =

- Baker
- U.S. National Register of Historic Places
- U.S. Historic district – Contributing property
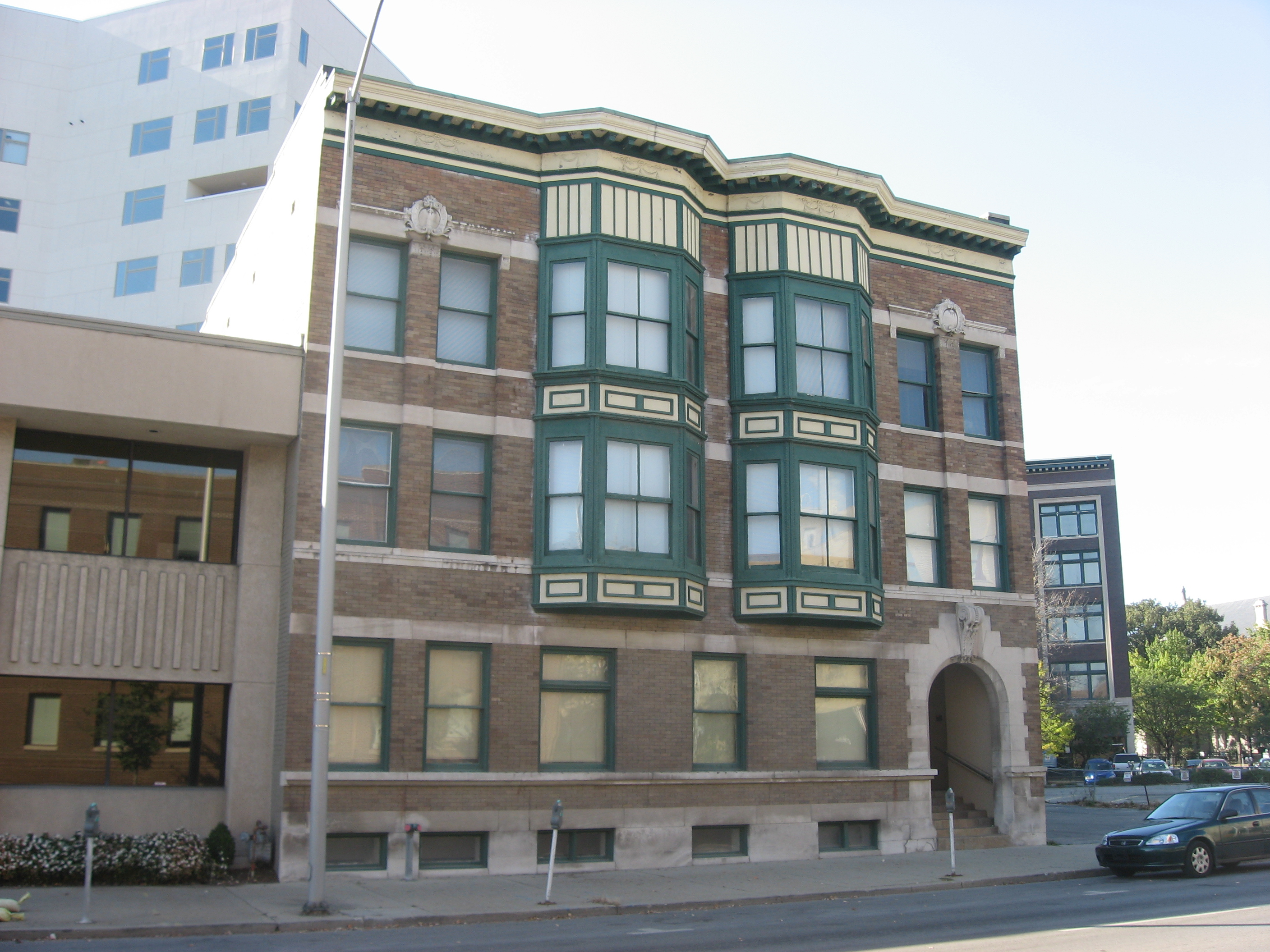
- Alabama Street front of the Baker, October 2010

- Location within Indianapolis Location within Indianapolis Location within Indiana Location within the United States
- Location: 310 N. Alabama St. and 341 Massachusetts Ave., Indianapolis, Indiana
- Coordinates: 39°46′18″N 86°9′9″W
- Area: less than one acre
- Built: 1905
- Architectural style: Classical Revival, Queen Anne
- MPS: Apartments and Flats of Downtown Indianapolis TR
- NRHP reference No.: 83000055
- Added to NRHP: September 15, 1983

The Baker, also known as Massala, is a historic apartment building located at Indianapolis, Indiana. It was built in 1905, and is a three-story, 10-bay by 12 bay, Classical Revival style brick building with Queen Anne style design elements. It has limestone detailing and features paired two-story bay windows on the upper floors.

It was listed on the National Register of Historic Places in 1983. It is located in the Massachusetts Avenue Commercial District.

== See also ==
- Apartments and Flats of Downtown Indianapolis Thematic Resources
- National Register of Historic Places listings in Center Township, Marion County, Indiana
