= Baker, Iran =

Baker بكر
- Village
- Location within Iran
- Coordinates: 28°35′16″N 55°01′58″E
- Country: Iran
- Province: Fars
- County: Darab
- Bakhsh: Rostaq
- Rural District: Kuhestan

Population (2006)
  - Total: 224
- Time zone: UTC+3:30 (IRST)
  - Summer (DST): UTC+4:30 (IRDT)

Baker (Persian: بكر, also Romanized as Bakr) is a village in Kuhestan Rural District, Rostaq District, Darab County, Fars province, Iran. At the 2006 census, its population was 224, in 67 families.
