= Liv Glacier =

Glacier in Antarctica

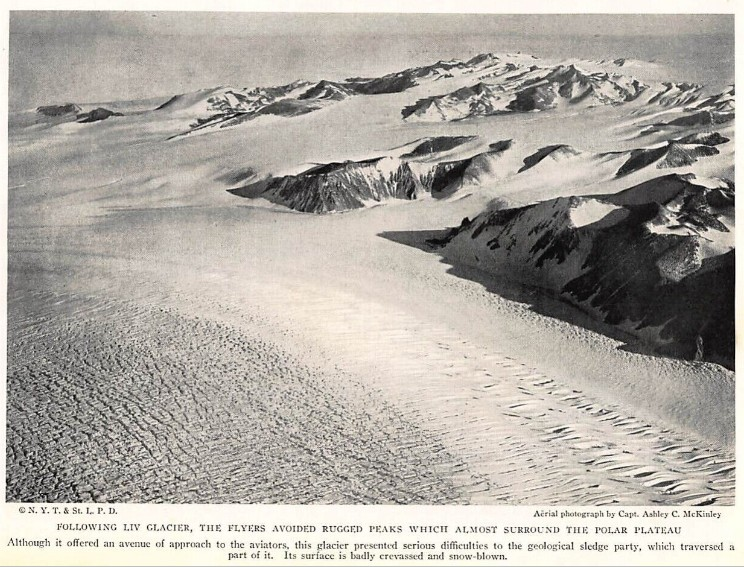
- Liv Glacier from the air in 1925

- Location within Antarctica
- Coordinates: 84°55′S 168°0′W
- Terminus: Ross Ice Shelf

Liv Glacier (84°55′S 168°0′W) is a steep valley glacier, 40 nautical miles (74 km; 46 mi) long, emerging from the Antarctic Plateau just southeast of Barnum Peak and draining north through the Queen Maud Mountains to enter Ross Ice Shelf between Mayer Crags and Duncan Mountains. It was discovered in 1911 by Roald Amundsen, who named it for the daughter of Fridtjof Nansen.

Richard E. Byrd chose this glacier as his route to the Polar Plateau on 28 November 1929 when he flew from Little America to the South Pole.

== Location ==
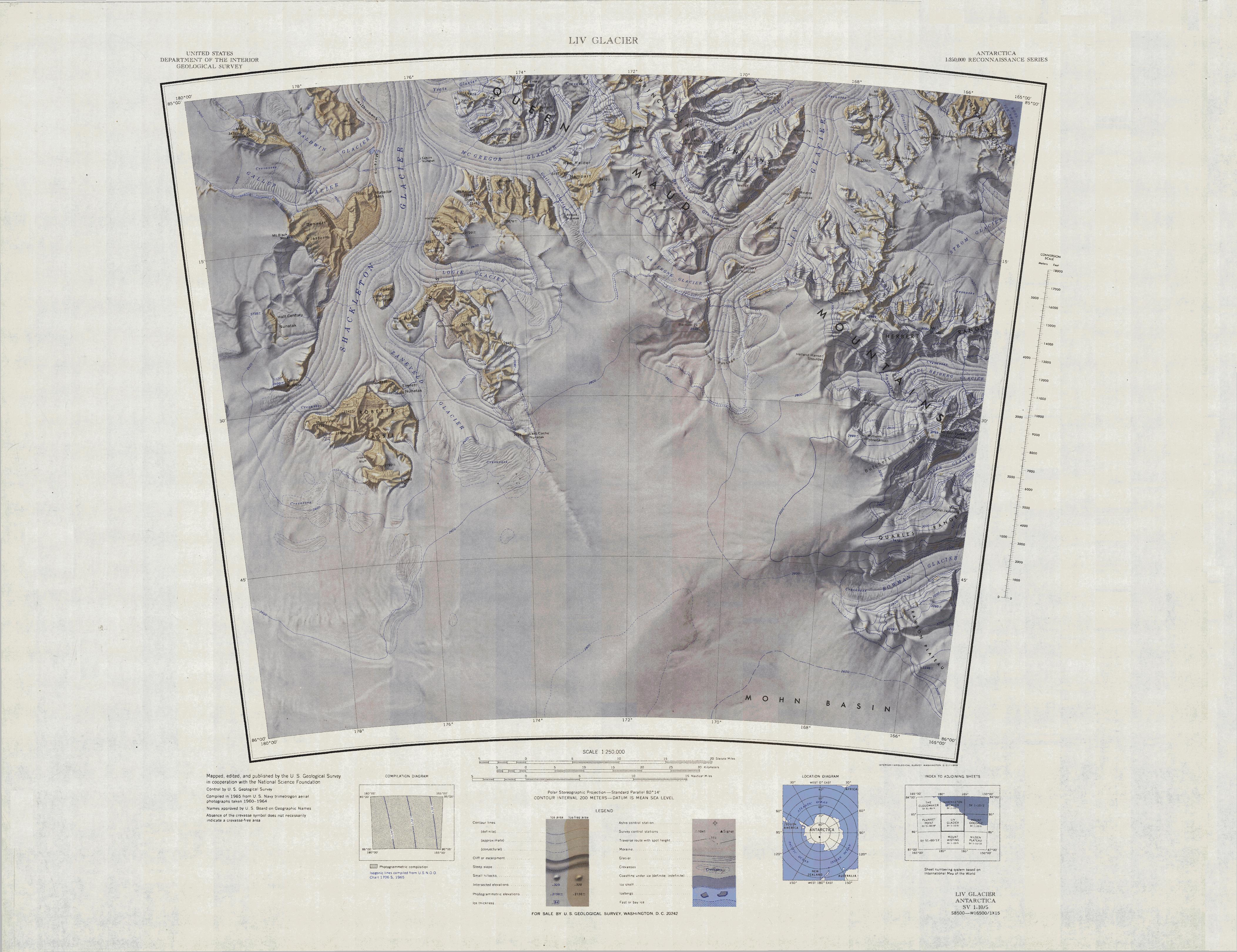
Upper course of the glacier (east of map)

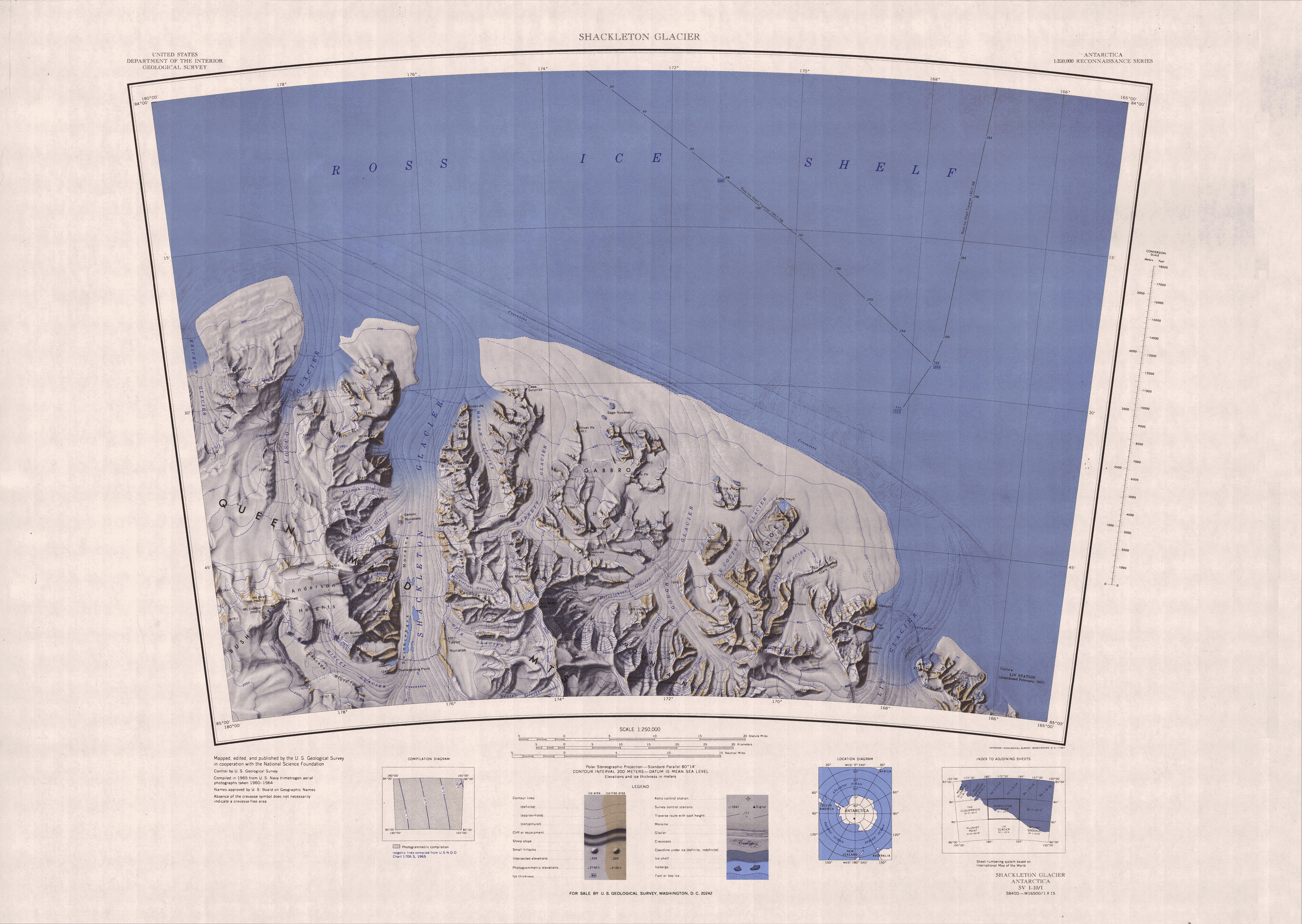
Mouth of the glacier (east of the map)

According to Sailing Directions for Antarctica (1960), "The Liv Glacier (85° S. 168° W.) reaches the Ross Ice Shelf on the western side of the Duncan Mountains. It is about 7 miles wide and trends southward about 40 miles to the polar plateau. The Fisher Mountains (Note: Fisher Mountains: the term is now limited to Mount Fisher in the Prince Olav Mountains.) rise prominently forming the western wall, and the massif of Mount Fridtjof Nansen, about 13,156 feet high, forms the eastern flank of the Liv Glacier. The northern slopes of this sandstone and granite massif were investigated by Gould in 1929, and coal beds found. Many tributary or dendritic glaciers feed the Liv Glacier from the heights of the bordering mountains."

The head of Liv Glacier is on the East Antarctic Ice Sheet, where it passes through Hump Passage. The glacier flow north, and near its head is joined by the LaVergne Glacier. It turn northeast, and flows on both sides past McKinley Nunatak, June Nunatak and Aviator Nunatak. Opposite June Nunatak it is joined from the left (northwest) by DeGanahl Glacier. Further down it is joined from the left by Zotikov Glacier, then from the right by Somero Glacier. It flows into the Ross Ice Shelf between Mount Henson to the northwest and Morris Peak to the southeast.

== Head ==
=== Hump Passage ===
85°27′S 170°12′W. A wide gap just southeast of Barnum Peak, through which Liv Glacier emerges from the polar plateau. It was originally referred to as the "Hump" by Rear Admiral Richard E. Byrd and is the pass over which he made his historic South Pole flight of 1929. The feature was observed by the Southern Party of NZGSAE (1961–62) who recommended perpetuation of a form of the original name.

== Nunataks ==
The three nunataks in Liv Glacier are, from south to north,

=== McKinley Nunatak ===
85°18′S 170°03′W. The southernmost of three large nunataks in upper Liv Glacier, about 5 nautical miles (9.3 km; 5.8 mi) north-north-east of Barnum Peak. Named by the Southern Party of the NZGSAE (1961–62) for Capt. Ashley C. McKinley, photographer with R. Admiral Richard E. Byrd on his South Pole flight of 1929.

=== June Nunatak ===
85°14′S 169°29′W. The central of three nunataks in mid-stream of the upper Liv Glacier, standing about 4 nautical miles (7.4 km; 4.6 mi) southeast of Mount Wells, in the Queen Maud Mountains. Named by the Southern Party of the NZGSAE (1961–62) for Harold June, aviator and engineer on the South Pole flight of R. Admiral Richard E. Byrd in 1929.

=== Aviator Nunatak ===
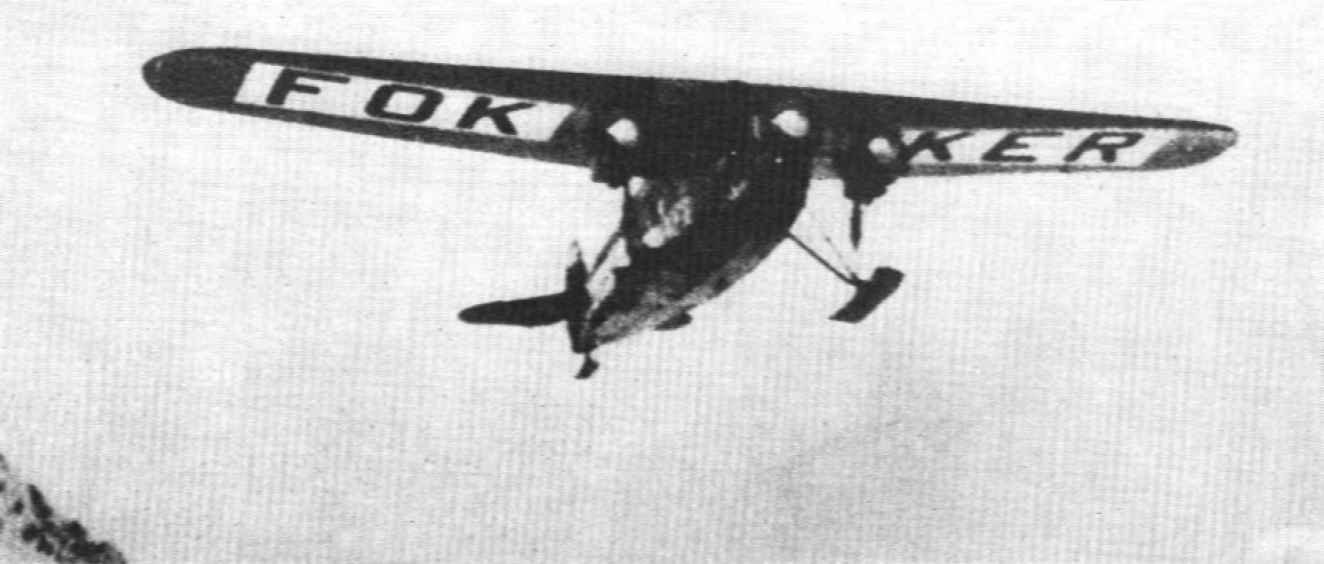
The Fokker F.VII of Byrd and Bennett in flight

85°11′S 168°58′W. The northernmost of three large nunataks in the upper Liv Glacier, standing 4 nautical miles (7.4 km; 4.6 mi) east of Mount Wells. Named by the Southern Party of the NZGSAE (1961–62) for the aviators of R. Admiral Richard E. Byrd's flight to the South Pole in 1929.

== Tributaries ==
=== LaVergne Glacier ===
85°19′S 170°45′W. A tributary glacier about 7 nautical miles (13 km; 8.1 mi) long, flowing east along the south slopes of Seabee Heights to enter Liv Glacier close southwest of McKinley Nunatak. Named by US-ACAN for Lt. Cdr. Cornelius B. de LaVergne, Deputy Commander of Antarctic Support Activity at McMurdo Station during USN OpdFrz 1961.

=== DeGanahl Glacier ===
85°13′S 170°35′W. A narrow, steep-walled glacier about 10 nautical miles (19 km; 12 mi) long, flowing southeast from Jones Peak into the west side of Liv Glacier, opposite June Nunatak. Discovered and photographed by R. Admiral Byrd on the South Pole Flight in November 1929 and named for Joe DeGanahl, navigator and dog driver and member of the Supporting Party, ByrdAE, 1928–30.

=== Zotikov Glacier ===
85°02′S 169°15′W. A tributary glacier, 8 nautical miles (15 km; 9.2 mi) long, flowing northeast from Mount Fisher in the Prince Olav Mountains and entering Liv Glacier just east of Hardiman Peak. Named by US-ACAN for Igor A. Zotikov, Soviet exchange scientist to the USARP at McMurdo Station in 1965.

=== Somero Glacier ===
85°00′S 167°12′W. A tributary glacier 7 nautical miles (13 km; 8.1 mi) long, flowing northwest from Mount Fairweather to enter Liv Glacier just south of the west end of the Duncan Mountains. Named by US-ACAN for George N. Somero, USARP biologist at McMurdo Station, 1963–64, and winter 1965.

== Sources ==
- Alberts, Fred G., ed. (1995), Geographic Names of the Antarctic (PDF) (2 ed.), United States Board on Geographic Names This article incorporates public domain material from websites or documents of the United States Board on Geographic Names.
- "Liv Glacier", NZ Gazette Reference, 2012
- Liv Glacier, USGS: United States Geological Survey
- Sailing Directions for Antarctica: Including the Off-Lying Islands South of Latitude 60 Degrees S. (2 ed.), United States. Hydrographic Office, 1960 This article incorporates public domain material from websites or documents of the United States Hydrographic Office.
- Shackleton Glacier, USGS: United States Geological Survey
- This article incorporates public domain material from websites or documents of the United States Geological Survey.
