= USS Mount Baker (AE-4) =

Ammunition ship of the United States Navy

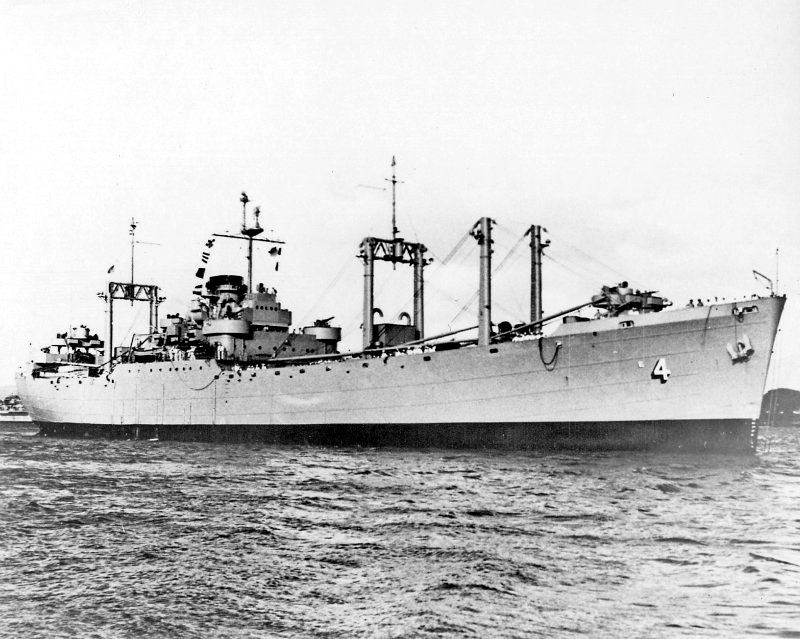
- InsertAltTextHere

History

United States
- Name: USS Mount Baker (AE-4); originally USS Kilauea (AE-4)
- Namesake: Mount Baker, Kilauea
- Completed: 1941
- Acquired: 14 November 1940
- Commissioned: 16 May 1941; 5 December 1951
- Decommissioned: January 1947
- Stricken: 2 December 1969
- Fate: Scrapped

General characteristics
- Class & type: Lassen-class ammunition ship
- Displacement: Light: 6,350 tons; Full load:13,855 tons
- Length: 459 ft (140 m)
- Beam: 63 ft (19.2 m)
- Draft: 25 ft 11 in (7.9 m)
- Propulsion: 2 x 9 cyl. Nordberg diesel engines each with 3155 brake horsepower at 225 rpm geared to 1 shaft
- Speed: 16 knots (30 km/h)
- Capacity: 5,000 deadweight tons
- Complement: 280 officers and enlisted
- Armament: 1 × single 5 in (127 mm) 38 caliber gun; 4 × single 3 in (76 mm) 50 caliber guns; 2 × twin 40 mm guns; 8 × twin 20 mm guns

USS Mount Baker (AE‑4), originally named USS Kilauea (AE-4), was acquired by the Navy 14 November 1940 while building by Tampa Shipbuilding Co., Tampa, Fla., as SS Surprise; delivered to Alabama Drydock & Shipbuilding Co., for conversion to Type C2; and commissioned 16 May 1941.

== Service history ==
=== 1941-1947 (World War II and aftermath) ===
Kilauea’s dangerous, difficult, and vital service during World War II was to carry ammunition to ships and bases and to issue it to the users. She began operating 17 June 1941 out of Norfolk, serving combatants on the east coast, in the Caribbean, and building up the base at NS Argentia, Newfoundland. Aside from necessary overhaul, and a period as station ammunition ship in the Norfolk area October 1942‑January 1943, she continued American theater duty into 1943.

Kilauea was renamed Mount Baker 17 March 1943 to avoid confusion with a similarly named ship. On 8 June, she sailed with ammunition for the Mediterranean, and until 6 November supplied ships in Oran, Algiers, Arzeu, Bizerte, and Palermo. Returning to Norfolk for local duty, Mount Baker then sailed 29 April 1944 to arm ships in the British Isles ports from which the Normandy invasion was to be staged. Returning to Norfolk 23 June, Mount Baker prepared for another mission to the Mediterranean, and upon its completion 30 September sailed directly for the Panama Canal and Ulithi, where she served as station ammunition ship from December 1944 to June 1945. During this time she conducted experiments in at‑sea replenishment with a battleship, a cruiser, and a destroyer.

Mount Baker departed Ulithi 3 June for overhaul at San Francisco, still in progress at the close of the year. She sailed in time to bring Christmas mail to occupation forces in the Philippines, then began the long task of bringing back to the United States unused ammunition that had been stockpiled at the various Pacific bases in anticipation of the planned invasion of Japan. She decommissioned in January 1947 and was placed in reserve at San Diego, Calif.

=== 1951-1954 (Korean War) ===
With the rapid expansion of the fleet required by the Korean War, Mount Baker recommissioned 5 December 1951. She sailed 18 February 1952 to supply ammunition to U.S. and other U.N. forces fighting the North Korean Communists, serving in the war zone from 9 March to 8 November, and then returning to San Diego. During this cruise, she collided with one of her escorts, the Republic of Korea Navy frigate ROKS Apnok on 21 May 1952, striking Apnok amidships; Apnok suffered 25 dead and 21 injured and was damaged beyond economical repair.

On 12 January 1953, Mount Baker sortied from San Francisco with a cruiser‑destroyer force for the largest, to that time, postwar training operation in the Pacific. Early in February she sailed for Sasebo, Japan, to resume combat duty. From March until the Armistice in July, Mount Baker gave efficient and essential service in the cause of a free Korea. Returning to San Diego early in the fall, she provided the fleet primarily with training ammunition, was overhauled, and 10 March 1954 sailed to support the 7th Fleet in operations off Japan and the Philippines.

=== 1955-1969 (Far East, Vietnam) ===
In 1955, and almost every year thereafter, Mount Baker made similar deployments to the Far East, usually of 8 months duration. Stateside periods between were given to necessary overhaul and training, as well as providing training in underway replenishment to other ships of the fleet. When she left San Diego 28 October 1964, she was bound for duty replenishing 7th Fleet ships operating off the coast of Vietnam during the Vietnam War. She also brought ammunition to ships of the Taiwan patrol and bases in Japan and the Philippines during this and her other recent deployments.

Returning to Port Chicago, Calif., in the spring of 1965, Mount Baker prepared for a year‑long deployment for which she sailed 5 January 1966. During much of this tour in the Far East, Mount Baker was on station with carriers off Vietnam, providing ammunition for aircraft flying strikes on North Vietnam and against enemy concentrations in South Vietnam. After overhaul at Hunter’s Point Naval Shipyard, the Mount Baker sailed again to the Far East on 28 September 1967 to aid the United States 7th Fleet, returning to Port Chicago in late April 1968. In June 1968 she underwent numerous minor fixes such as a boiler re-tubing and the pit sword at Port Chicago. In October 1968, the Mount Baker left for its final cruise to the Far East, carrying out its mission of underway (at-sea) transfers of ammunition to the 7th Fleet aircraft carriers, cruisers, destroyers and the one battleship New Jersey off the coast of Vietnam. This final mission was completed in July 1969, after which it returned to Port Chicago, and several months later was sent to Mare Island, Vallejo, for dismantling.

Mount Baker was struck from the Naval Register on 2 December 1969 and transferred to the Maritime Administration for disposal, she was scrapped in 1974.

== Honours and awards ==
Mount Baker received four battle stars for Korean service.
